= My Kitchen Rules series 8 =

My Kitchen Rules
- Series 8
- No. of episodes: 48

Release
- Original network: Seven Network
- Original release: 30 January – 30 April 2017

Season chronology
- ← Previous; Series 7 (2016) Next → Series 9 (2018)

The eighth season of the Australian competitive cooking competition show My Kitchen Rules premiered on the Seven Network on 30 January 2017.

Applications for contestants opened during the airing of the seventh season. Pete Evans and Manu Feildel returned as hosts, with Colin Fassnidge who was joined by Darren Robertson in the instant restaurant round.

The start date for the season was confirmed in January 2017, and once again debuted the evening following the network's coverage of the Men's Singles final at the 2017 Australian Open.

Four special episodes of The Chase Australia aired featuring eight teams from this season, premiering on 16 February at 7:30pm.

== Format changes ==
- Teams – All 18 teams from three groups appeared from the start of the competition. Although there have been the same number of teams in the past, a third group was usually introduced later in the competition.
- Special Guest Judges – Two special celebrity guest judges have appeared alongside the main judging panel for some challenges.
  - Darren Robertson – Joined Colin Fassnidge as judges for Group 3's Instant Restaurant round.
  - Curtis Stone – Makes his second appearance as a guest judge alongside Pete and Colin during the fourth People's choice challenge.
- Instant Restaurant Sudden Death – This season, the two lowest scoring teams from each round competed against each other in a Sudden Death Cook-Off to determine the team to be eliminated. In previous series, the lowest scoring team at the end of each Instant Restaurant group was immediately eliminated.
- Ultimate Instant Restaurants – Eight teams travelled around together in the biggest Instant Restaurant in the show's history.

== Teams ==
Home/State		Group	Members	Relationship	Status
Kangaroo Point	QLD	1	Amy & Tyson	Brother and Sister	Winners 30 April (Grand Final)
New Farm	QLD	3	Valerie & Courtney	Mother and Daughter	Runners-up 30 April (Grand Final)
Happy Valley	SA	1	Tim & Kyle	Pub Mates	Eliminated 26 April (Semi-Final 2)
Punchbowl	NSW	1	David & Betty	Just Friends	Eliminated 25 April (Semi-Final 1)
Greensborough	VIC	3	Mark & Chris	Friends	Eliminated 24 April (Top 5: Quarterfinal 4)
Pullenvale	QLD	2	Della & Sarah	Foodie Friends	Eliminated 23 April (Top 6: Quarterfinal 3)
Diamond Creek	VIC	1	Karen & Ros	Midwives	Eliminated 19 April (Top 7: Quarterfinal 2)
Melbourne	VIC	2	Court & Duncan	Married Hipsters	Eliminated 18 April (Top 8: Quarterfinal 1)
Broome	WA	2	Josh & Amy	Married	Eliminated 17 April (Top 9: Ultimate Instant Restaurant)
Brisbane	QLD	3	Brett & Marie	First Loves	Eliminated 26 March (Top 10)
Wollongong	NSW	3	Mell & Cyn	Friends	Eliminated 21 March (Top 11)
Harrington Park	NSW	2	Kelsey & Amanda	Sisters	Eliminated 19 March (Top 12)
Doncaster East	VIC	3	Caitie & Demi	Uni Friends	Eliminated 14 March (Top 13)
Burnie	TAS	1	Damo & Caz	Tassie Sweethearts	Eliminated 12 March (Top 14)
Epping	NSW	2	Albert & Dave	Brothers	Eliminated 7 March (Top 15)
Paradise	SA	3	Lama & Sarah	Cousins	Eliminated 6 March (Instant Restaurant: Round 3)
Sheldon	QLD	2	Alyse & Matt	Married	Eliminated 21 February (Instant Restaurant: Round 2)
Perth	WA	1	Bek & Ash	Flirty Flatmates	Eliminated 8 February (Instant Restaurant: Round 1)

== Elimination history ==
Teams' Competition Progress
Round:	Instant Restaurants						Top 15	Top 14	Top 13	Top 12	Top 11	Top 10	Top 9		Top 8	Top 7	Top 6	Top 5	Semi-Finals		Grand Final
Round:	1		2		3		Top 15	Top 14	Top 13	Top 12	Top 11	Top 10	HQ	UIR	Quarter Finals				1	2	Grand Final
Teams:	Progress																				
Amy & Tyson	**1st** (102)	→	—N/a		—N/a		**Immune**	**SD** (37)	**PC**; Safe	**PC**; Safe	**PC**; Safe	**PC**; Safe	→	**4th** (83)	**HQ**; Safe	**Judges'**; **Choice**	**HQ**; Safe	**Judges'**; **Choice**	**1st** (51)	—N/a	**Winners** (57)
Valerie & Courtney	—N/a		—N/a		**1st** (72)	→	**Immune**	**PC**; Safe	**PC**; Safe	**PC**; Safe	**Shoppers'**; **Choice**	**Immune**	→	**1st** (99)	**HQ**; Safe	**HQ**; Safe	**SD**; Safe	**HQ**; Safe	—N/a	**1st** (50)	**Runners-up** (52)
Tim & Kyle	**2nd** (100)	→	—N/a		—N/a		**HQ**; Safe	**People's**; **Choice**	**Immune**	**PC**; Safe	**PC**; Safe	**Neighbours'**; **Choice**	**Win**	**Immune**	**HQ**; Safe	**SD**; Safe	**Judges'**; **Choice**	**SD**; Safe	—N/a	**2nd** (46)	**Eliminated** (Episode 47)
David & Betty	**5th** (61)	**SD** (34)	—N/a		—N/a		**Judges'**; **Choice**	**Immune**	**PC**; Safe	**PC**; Safe	**PC**; Safe	**PC**; Safe	→	**3rd** (86)	**SD**; Safe	**HQ**; Safe	**HQ**; Safe	**HQ**; Safe	**2nd** (49)	**Eliminated** (Episode 46)	
Mark & Chris	—N/a		—N/a		**3rd** (70)	→	**Judges'**; **Choice**	**Immune**	**SD** (31)	**PC**; Safe	**PC**; Safe	**SD** (47)	→	**5th** (78)	**HQ**; Safe	**HQ**; Safe	**HQ**; Safe	**SD**; Lose	**Eliminated** (Episode 45)		
Della & Tully	—N/a		**4th** (58)	→	—N/a		**HQ**; Safe	**PC**; Safe	**PC**; Safe	**Passengers'**; **Choice**	**Immune**	**PC**; Safe	→	**2nd** (88)	**Judges'**; **Choice**	**HQ**; Safe	**SD**; Lose	**Eliminated** (Episode 44)			
Karen & Ros	**3rd** (65)	→	—N/a		—N/a		**HQ**; Safe	**PC**; Safe	**PC**; Safe	**PC**; Safe	**PC**; Safe	**PC**; Safe	→	**7th** (67)	**HQ**; Safe	**SD**; Lose	**Eliminated** (Episode 43)				
Court & Duncan	—N/a		**2nd** (62)	→	—N/a		**SD**; Safe	**PC**; Safe	**Bikers'**; **Choice**	**Immune**	**SD** (50)	**PC**; Safe	→	**6th** (77)	**SD**; Lose	**Eliminated** (Episode 42)					
Josh & Amy	—N/a		**6th** (43)	**SD** (29)	—N/a		**HQ**; Safe	**PC**; Safe	**PC**; Safe	**SD** (28)	**PC**; Safe	**PC**; Safe	→	**8th** (31)	**Eliminated** (Episode 41)						
Brett & Marie	—N/a		—N/a		**4th** (69)	→	**HQ**; Safe	**PC**; Safe	**PC**; Safe	**PC**; Safe	**PC**; Safe	**SD** (35)	**Eliminated** (Episode 32)								
Mell & Cyn	—N/a		—N/a		**2nd** (71)	→	**HQ**; Safe	**PC**; Safe	**PC**; Safe	**PC**; Safe	**SD** (34)	**Eliminated** (Episode 30)									
Kelsey & Amanda	—N/a		**1st** (95)	→	—N/a		**Immune**	**PC**; Safe	**PC**; Safe	**SD** (26)	**Eliminated** (Episode 28)										
Caitie & Demi	—N/a		—N/a		**5th** (60)	**SD** (34)	**HQ**; Safe	**PC**; Safe	**SD** (24)	**Eliminated** (Episode 26)											
Damo & Caz	**4th** (62)	→	—N/a		—N/a		**HQ**; Safe	**SD** (29)	**Eliminated** (Episode 24)												
Albert & Dave	—N/a		**3rd** (60)	→	—N/a		**SD**; Lose	**Eliminated** (Episode 22)													
Lama & Sarah	—N/a		—N/a		**6th** (39)	**SD** (25)	**Eliminated** (Episode 21)														
Alyse & Matt	—N/a		**5th** (52)	**SD** (27)	**Eliminated** (Episode 14)																
Bek & Ash	**6th** (26)	**SD** (31)	**Eliminated** (Episode 7)																		

Cell Descriptions
	Team won a challenge, People's Choice, cooked the best dish or received the highest score for the round.
	Team lost a challenge, cooked the weakest dish or received a low score and must compete in an additional round or challenge.
Safe	Team was safe from elimination after passing a challenge. (If applicable, team was safe after the challenge listed in bold); **PC** = People's Choice, **HQ** = Kitchen Headquarters challenge, **SD** = Sudden Death
→	Team advanced to next round.
**SD**	Team competed in a Sudden Death Cook-Off and became safe from elimination.
**SD**	Team was eliminated after losing in a Sudden Death Cook-Off or round.
**Immune**	From winning the previous challenge, the team was immune from elimination and was not required to participate.
—N/a	Results do not apply as the team was not allocated to this challenge or round.

== Competition details ==
=== Instant Restaurants ===
During the Instant Restaurant rounds, each team hosts a three-course dinner for judges and fellow teams in their allocated group. They are scored and ranked among their group, with the two lowest scoring teams competing in a Sudden Death Cook-Off, where one team is eliminated.

==== Round 1 ====
- Episodes 1 to 6
- Air date — 30 January to 7 February
- Description — The first of the three instant restaurant groups are introduced into the competition in Round 1. The two lowest scoring teams at the end of this round go through to Sudden Death, where one team is eliminated.

Instant Restaurant Summary
Group 1
Team and Episode Details		Guest Scores						Pete's Scores			Manu's Scores			Total (out of 110)	Rank	Result
Team and Episode Details		D&C	D&B	K&R	B&A	T&K	A&T	Entrée	Main	Dessert	Entrée	Main	Dessert	Total (out of 110)	Rank	Result
TAS	Damo & Caz	—	6	6	5	5	6	8	5	3	7	6	5	62	4th	Safe
Ep 1	30 January	'Sound Check'														Safe
Dishes	Entrée	Truffle and Cauliflower Soup with Rustic Crusty Bread														Safe
Dishes	Main	Steak with Duck Fat Potatoes, Green Beans and Béarnaise Sauce														Safe
Dishes	Dessert	Apple Crumble Cheesecake with Stewed Rhubarb														Safe
NSW	David & Betty	5	—	7	7	5	6	7	7	1	7	7	2	61	5th	Through to Sudden Death
Ep 2	31 January	Anchor & Palms														Through to Sudden Death
Dishes	Entrée	Crispy Pork Belly with Steamed Bun and Pickled Cucumber														Through to Sudden Death
Dishes	Main	Barramundi in Sweet and Sour Broth with Crispy Rice and Asian Greens														Through to Sudden Death
Dishes	Dessert	Green Tea Cream Doughnut with Chocolate Glaze and Matcha Affogato														Through to Sudden Death
VIC	Karen & Ros	6	6	—	6	6	7	8	2	7	8	2	7	65	3rd	Safe
Ep 3	1 February	Procreations														Safe
Dishes	Entrée	Ricotta Gnocchi with Sage and Walnut Sauce and Blue Cheese														Safe
Dishes	Main	Middle Eastern Lamb with Couscous Stuffing and Orange Jus														Safe
Dishes	Dessert	Spiced Pavlova and Roasted Fruits														Safe
WA	Bek & Ash	3	4	4	—	3	3	1	1	3	1	1	2	26	6th	Through to Sudden Death
Ep 4	5 February	Wildfields														Through to Sudden Death
Dishes	Entrée	Roasted Vegetable Tart with Balsamic Glaze														Through to Sudden Death
Dishes	Main	Goldband Snapper with Fennel, Fig and Pear Salad														Through to Sudden Death
Dishes	Dessert	Profiteroles with Orange Custard and Chocolate Sauce														Through to Sudden Death
SA	Tim & Kyle	9	8	9	9	—	9	10	10	8	10	10	8	100	2nd	Safe
Ep 5	6 February	The Boys' Backyard														Safe
Dishes	Entrée	Tuna Ceviche with Puffed Wild Rice, Avocado Purée and Wasabi Mayonnaise														Safe
Dishes	Main	Spiced Kangaroo with Beetroot, Walnut Purée and Weed Salad														Safe
Dishes	Dessert	Key Lime Pie with Vanilla Ice-Cream														Safe
QLD	Amy & Tyson	9	8	9	9	8	—	10	10	10	10	9	10	102	1st	Safe
Ep 6	7 February	Mosaic														Safe
Dishes	Entrée	Lambs Brains with Cauliflower Purée, Sriracha Aioli and Pickles														Safe
Dishes	Main	Pork Jowl with Eggplant Purée, Pumpkin Purée, Pommes Frites and Apple Cider Sauce														Safe
Dishes	Dessert	Chocolate Raspberry Discovery														Safe

==== Sudden Death Cook-Off 1 ====
- Episode 7
- Airdate — 8 February
- Description — Being the two bottom scoring teams from Round 1, David & Betty and Bek & Ash will face off in a Sudden Death Cook-Off. The lower scoring team is eliminated.

Sudden Death Cook-Off Results
Sudden Death Cook-Off 1
Team		Judge's Scores						Total (out of 60)	Result
Team		Karen	Guy	Liz	Colin	Pete	Manu	Total (out of 60)	Result
NSW	David & Betty	6	6	5	5	6	6	34	Safe
Dishes	Entrée	Lao Raw Beef Salad							Safe
Dishes	Main	Mok Pah							Safe
Dishes	Dessert	Chilli Salt Fruits with Green Mango and Pineapple Sorbets							Safe
WA	Bek & Ash	5	6	5	4	5	6	31	Eliminated
Dishes	Entrée	Mushroom Crêpes with Brie Sauce							Eliminated
Dishes	Main	Venison on Black Rice Pilaf with Cumberland Sauce							Eliminated
Dishes	Dessert	Biscotti with Pistachio Ice Cream and Lemon Curd							Eliminated

==== Round 2 ====
- Episodes 8 to 13
- Airdate — 12 February to 20 February
- Description — The second group now start their Instant Restaurant round. The same rules from the previous round apply and the two lowest scoring teams go to Sudden Death, where one team is eliminated.

Instant Restaurant Summary
Group 2
Team and Episode Details		Guest Scores						Pete's Scores			Manu's Scores			Total (out of 110)	Rank	Result
Team and Episode Details		A&D	K&A	C&D	J&A	D&T	A&M	Entrée	Main	Dessert	Entrée	Main	Dessert	Total (out of 110)	Rank	Result
NSW	Albert & Dave	—	5	6	4	6	5	4	3	9	3	6	9	60	3rd	Safe
Ep 8	12 February	Laughing Out Lau														Safe
Dishes	Entrée	Eight Treasures Fortune Bag with Scallops														Safe
Dishes	Main	Hainan Chicken														Safe
Dishes	Dessert	Hong Kong Egg Tart with Warmed Banana														Safe
NSW	Kelsey & Amanda	9	—	9	8	8	7	10	9	9	10	8	8	95	1st	Safe
Ep 9	13 February	The Bright Side														Safe
Dishes	Entrée	Ricotta and Spinach Ravioli with Saffron Burnt Butter														Safe
Dishes	Main	Crispy Skin Snapper with Potato Mash and Lemon & Chive Sauce														Safe
Dishes	Dessert	Chocolate Fondant with Berry Coulis														Safe
VIC	Court & Duncan	3	5	—	5	7	6	5	10	3	5	9	4	62	2nd	Safe
Ep 10	14 February	Gastroturf														Safe
Dishes	Entrée	Beetroot Gravlax of Ocean Trout with Radish and Pea Shoot Salad														Safe
Dishes	Main	Smoked Lamb Ribs with Crushed Kipflers and Parsnip Purée														Safe
Dishes	Dessert	S'more														Safe
WA	Josh & Amy	4	4	3	—	4	3	5	1	4	5	2	8	43	6th	Through to Sudden Death
Ep 11	15 February	Longshore Drift														Through to Sudden Death
Dishes	Entrée	Chorizo Stuffed Squid														Through to Sudden Death
Dishes	Main	Beer Battered Barramundi with Shoestring Fries and Tartare Sauce														Through to Sudden Death
Dishes	Dessert	Cape Brandy Pudding with Chantilly Cream and Strawberries														Through to Sudden Death
QLD	Della & Tully	4	5	5	5	—	5	4	7	6	5	7	5	58	4th	Safe
Ep 12	19 February	Pepper Tree														Safe
Dishes	Entrée	Charred Quail with Couscous, Pomegranate, Feta and Mint														Safe
Dishes	Main	Smoked Duck with Beetroot, Grapes and Cherries														Safe
Dishes	Dessert	Orange Cake with Yoghurt Sorbet														Safe
QLD	Alyse & Matt	4	4	5	1	5	—	8	1	8	7	1	8	52	5th	Through to Sudden Death
Ep 13	20 February	Birdcage														Through to Sudden Death
Dishes	Entrée	Pork San Choy Bau														Through to Sudden Death
Dishes	Main	Beef Satay with Pumpkin and Coconut Rice														Through to Sudden Death
Dishes	Dessert	Vanilla Panna Cotta with Mandarin and Biscotti														Through to Sudden Death

==== Sudden Death Cook-Off 2 ====
- Episode 14
- Airdate — 21 February
- Description — Being the two bottom scoring teams from Round 2, Josh & Amy and Alyse & Matt will compete against each other in a Sudden Death Cook-Off. The lower scoring team is eliminated.

Sudden Death Cook-Off Results
Sudden Death Cook-Off 2
Team		Judge's Scores						Total (out of 60)	Result
Team		Karen	Guy	Liz	Colin	Pete	Manu	Total (out of 60)	Result
WA	Josh & Amy	4	6	5	4	5	5	29	Safe
Dishes	Entrée	Yellowtail Kingfish with Coriander Nam Jim and Apple Salad							Safe
Dishes	Main	Thai Green Curry with Spanish Mackerel							Safe
Dishes	Dessert	Lemon Meringue Pie							Safe
QLD	Alyse & Matt	5	5	4	4	4	5	27	Eliminated
Dishes	Entrée	Sumac Spiced Salmon with Figs							Eliminated
Dishes	Main	Lemon and Herb Spatchcock with Silverbeet and Carrot Purée							Eliminated
Dishes	Dessert	Banoffee Pavlova with Peanut Praline							Eliminated

==== Round 3 ====
- Episodes 15 to 20
- Airdate — 22 February to 5 March
- Description — The third group now start their Instant Restaurant round. The same rules from the previous round apply and the two lowest scoring teams go to Sudden Death, where one team is eliminated.

Instant Restaurant Summary
Group 3
Team and episode details		Guest scores						Darren's scores			Colin's scores			Total (out of 110)	Rank	Result
Team and episode details		B&B	C&R	L&M	K&K	A&J	D&M	Entrée	Main	Dessert	Entrée	Main	Dessert	Total (out of 110)	Rank	Result
NSW	Bib & Bob	—	2	7	5	6	5	4	9	2	4	9	2	55	5th	Through to Sudden Death
Ep 15	22 February	BimBom														Through to Sudden Death
Dishes	Entrée	Roasted Pumpkin and Feta Salad with Honey-Balsamic Glaze														Through to Sudden Death
Dishes	Main	Lemon-Thyme Roast Chicken with Garlic Mash and Seasonal Vegetables														Through to Sudden Death
Dishes	Dessert	Vanilla Bean Panna Cotta with Raspberry Coulis and Shortbread Crumble														Through to Sudden Death
VIC	China & Rosita	5	—	7	4	7	7	10	1	6	10	1	10	68	3rd	Safe
Ep 16	26 February	ShangHai														Safe
Dishes	Entrée	San Choy Bow														Safe
Dishes	Main	Donpou Rou with Rice and Greens														Safe
Dishes	Dessert	Deconstructed Mango Pudding with Black Sesame Ice Cream & Coconut Sago														Safe
WA	Kiki & Kevin	2	5	4	—	3	2	6	5	2	5	4	3	41	6th	Through to Sudden Death
Ep 17	27 February	Symmetry														Through to Sudden Death
Dishes	Entrée	Crispy Skin Duck Breast with Orange Chilli Glaze														Through to Sudden Death
Dishes	Main	Coq au Vin														Through to Sudden Death
Dishes	Dessert	Cheese and Vanilla Profiteroles with Blueberry Jam Icecream														Through to Sudden Death
SA	Aaron & Josh	6	7	7	4	—	5	7	7	5	5	8	5	66	4th	Safe
Ep 18	28th February	Backstreet Boys														Safe
Dishes	Entrée	Pan Seared Scallops with Bacon Bits and Cauliflower Puree														Safe
Dishes	Main	BBQ Ribs with Asian Slaw and Crispy Shallots														Safe
Dishes	Dessert	Chocolate Mousse Dome														Safe
WA	Lynette & Matt	9	10	—	8	8	7	7	10	10	7	8	9	93	1st	Safe
Ep 19	1st March	The Velvet Table														Safe
Dishes	Entrée	Twice Cooked Octopus with Chimichurri and Spanakorizo														Safe
Dishes	Main	Pumpkin Ravioli with Crispy Sage and Brown Butter														Safe
Dishes	Dessert	Tiramisu														Safe
QLD	Demi & Melina	9	7	8	4	10	—	10	6	10	10	6	9	89	2nd	Safe
Ep 20	5th March	Ellinikí Kouzína														Safe
Dishes	Entrée	Moussaka														Safe
Dishes	Main	Souvlaki, Halloumi, Pita and Tzatziki														Safe
Dishes	Dessert	Portokalopita with Whipped Greek Yogurt and Vanilla Bean Crème Fraîche														Safe

==== Sudden Death Cook-Off 3 ====
- Episode 21
- Airdate — 6 March
- Description — Being the two bottom scoring teams from Round 3, Caitie & Demi and Lama & Sarah will face off in a Sudden Death Cook-Off. The lower scoring team is eliminated.

Sudden Death Cook-Off Results
Sudden Death Cook-Off 3
Team		Judge's Scores						Total (out of 60)	Result
Team		Karen	Guy	Liz	Colin	Pete	Manu	Total (out of 60)	Result
WA	Kiki & Kevin	4	5	4	4	3	2	22	Safe
Dishes	Entrée	Zucchini Fritters with Tzatziki							Safe
Dishes	Main	Roasted Chicken with Candied Bacon and Egg Tart							Safe
Dishes	Dessert	Brownie with Rosewater Icecream							Safe
NSW	Bib & Bob	2	1	3	1	1	2	10	Eliminated
Dishes	Entrée	Spicy Prawns with Crusty Bread							Eliminated
Dishes	Main	Lamb Cutlets with Couscous Salad and Mint Pea Purée							Eliminated
Dishes	Dessert	Caramelised Figs with Olive Oil Ice-Cream							Eliminated

=== Top 15 ===
==== Kitchen HQ: Cookbook Challenge ====
- Episode 22
- Airdate — 7 March
- Description — The teams must choose recipes to cook out of either Pete or Manu's cookbooks. The top teams from each instant restaurant round were safe and were not required to cook. Then, the rest of the teams were divided into two groups of six. They must memorise the recipes, then cook the dish. The winning team from each group were decided by Pete and Manu and were safe from two eliminations. The bottom teams from each group must cook a dessert, with the team cooking the worst dessert to be eliminated.

Challenge Summary
Team		Dish	Result
QLD	Amy & Tyson	—N/a	Safe (Immunity)
NSW	Kelsey & Amanda	—N/a	Safe (Immunity)
QLD	Valerie & Courtney	—N/a	Safe (Immunity)
Round 1: Entrée
VIC	Mark & Chris	Kingfish with Parsnip Purée, Pickled Onion and Speck	Judges' Choice
SA	Tim & Kyle	Calves Liver with Caramelised Onion	Safe (Through to Top 14)
VIC	Caitie & Demi	Japanese Pancake with Scallops and Shiitake Mushrooms	Safe (Through to Top 14)
QLD	Della & Tully	Deep-Fried Coral Trout Salad with Japanese Dressing	Safe (Through to Top 14)
QLD	Brett & Marie	Sautéed Squid with Malaysian Spinach	Safe (Through to Top 14)
VIC	Court & Duncan	Mussels with Speck and Cider	Through to Round 3
Round 2: Main
NSW	David & Betty	Tomato Prawn Curry	Judges' Choice
TAS	Damo & Caz	Fillet of Venison with Pepper Sauce	Safe (Through to Top 14)
VIC	Karen & Ros	Brazilian Fish Stew	Safe (Through to Top 14)
WA	Josh & Amy	Chilli Mud Crab	Safe (Through to Top 14)
NSW	Mell & Cyn	Spatchcock with Preserved Lemon, Chilli and Rosemary	Safe (Through to Top 14)
NSW	Albert & Dave	Pearl Barley Risotto with Wild Mushrooms	Through to Round 3
Round 3: Dessert
VIC	Court & Duncan	Chocolate Pudding with Hazelnut Shortbread and Citrus Foam	Safe
NSW	Albert & Dave	Red Bean Pancake with Mango and Grapefruit Sago Soup	Eliminated

=== Top 14 ===
==== People's Choice 1: Beach BBQ Challenge ====
- Episode 23
- Airdate — 8 March
- Location — Newport Beach, New South Wales
- Description — The teams cooked a lunch for 200 lifesavers and nippers to say thank you for all their hard work. The food had to be easy to eat on the go. The team with the most votes was People's Choice and was safe from two eliminations. The bottom two teams, decided by and Colin and Pete, have to enter the next Sudden Death Cook-Off.

Challenge Summary
People's Choice 1
Team		Dish	Result
NSW	David & Betty	—N/a	Safe (Immunity)
VIC	Mark & Chris	—N/a	Safe (Immunity)
SA	Tim & Kyle	Scotch Fillet with Summer Salad and Taragon Mayonnaise	People's Choice
QLD	Della & Tully	Barbecue Prawns with Kale and Avocado Mousse	Safe (Through to Top 13)
QLD	Valerie & Courtney	Chicken Tandoori Skewers with Paratha Bread and Mango Salsa	Safe (Through to Top 13)
VIC	Court & Duncan	Seared Salmon with Asian Salad and Wasabi Mayo	Safe (Through to Top 13)
VIC	Karen & Ros	Dukkah Covered Lamb with Grilled Vegetables and Tzatziki	Safe (Through to Top 13)
QLD	Brett & Marie	Spiced Chicken and Burrito Burger	Safe (Through to Top 13)
VIC	Caitie & Demi	Soutzoukakia with Potato Salad and Herb Yoghurt	Safe (Through to Top 13)
NSW	Kelsey & Amanda	Lamb Kofta with Flatbread, Tabouli, Hummus and Garlic Sauce	Safe (Through to Top 13)
NSW	Mell & Cyn	Pork Skewers with Quinoa Salad	Safe (Through to Top 13)
WA	Josh & Amy	Gourmet Hotdog with Tomato Relish	Safe (Through to Top 13)
QLD	Amy & Tyson	Mexican Beef with Tortilla Chips	Through to Sudden Death
TAS	Damo & Caz	Chicken Fajita with Grilled Pineapple Salsa and Avocado Cream	Through to Sudden Death

==== Sudden Death Cook-Off 4 ====
- Episode 24
- Airdate — 12 March
- Description — As the two weakest teams from the Beach BBQ challenge, Amy & Tyson and Damo & Caz have to compete against each other in a Sudden Death Cook-Off, where one team will be eliminated. The winning team goes through to the Top 13.

Sudden Death Cook-Off Results
Sudden Death Cook-Off 4
Team		Judge's Scores						Total (out of 60)	Result
Team		Karen	Guy	Liz	Colin	Pete	Manu	Total (out of 60)	Result
QLD	Amy & Tyson	6	6	7	6	6	6	37	Safe
Dishes	Entrée	Steak Tartare with Parmesan Crisp							Safe
Dishes	Main	Oxtail, Steak and Kidney Stew							Safe
Dishes	Dessert	Cheese Sorbet with Walnut Cake and Carrot							Safe
TAS	Damo & Caz	5	4	5	5	5	5	29	Eliminated
Dishes	Entrée	Fish Cakes with Lime Slaw and Sriracha Aioli							Eliminated
Dishes	Main	Lamb Backstrap with Roasted Beetroot, Capsicum Purée and Goats Cheese Cream							Eliminated
Dishes	Dessert	Red Wine Poached Pears with Cinnamon Ice-Cream							Eliminated

=== Top 13 ===
==== People's Choice 2: Baking For Bikers Challenge ====
- Episode 25
- Airdate — 13 March
- Location — Pink Ribbon Motorcycle Ride at Club Marconi, New South Wales
- Description — The teams cooked for the Pink Ribbon Motorcycle ride for breast cancer, each team had to raise the most charity money by getting as many bikers to pay for their food. The bikies determined the top team winning Biker's Choice, while the two bottom teams will go to the next Sudden Death elimination.

Challenge Summary
People's Choice 2
Team		Dish	Result
SA	Tim & Kyle	—N/a	Safe (Immunity)
VIC	Court & Duncan	Jalapeño Cornbread with Beef Chilli Dip	Bikers' Choice
QLD	Amy & Tyson	Dark Chocolate and Salted Caramel Brownie	Safe (Through to Top 12)
VIC	Karen & Ros	Lemon Meringue Friand	Safe (Through to Top 12)
NSW	David & Betty	Massaman Beef Pot Pie with Mashed Potato	Safe (Through to Top 12)
QLD	Della & Tully	Berry Eclair with White Chocolate	Safe (Through to Top 12)
NSW	Kelsey & Amanda	Pavlova Nest with Whipped Cream and Berries	Safe (Through to Top 12)
WA	Josh & Amy	Zucchini, Goats Cheese and Chorizo Muffin	Safe (Through to Top 12)
NSW	Mell & Cyn	Pork and Veal Empanada with Tomato Relish	Safe (Through to Top 12)
QLD	Valerie & Courtney	Sticky Date Cupcake with Cream Cheese Icing	Safe (Through to Top 12)
QLD	Brett & Marie	Italian Peach Biscuits	Safe (Through to Top 12)
VIC	Caitie & Demi	Rosewater Meringue with Salted Caramel	Through to Sudden Death
VIC	Mark & Chris	Apple Pie and Custard Doughnut	Through to Sudden Death

==== Sudden Death Cook-Off 5 ====
- Episode 26
- Airdate — 14 March
- Description — As the two weakest teams from the Biker's Challenge, Mark & Chris and Caitie & Demi have to compete against each other in a Sudden Death Cook-Off, where one team will be eliminated. The winning team goes through to the Top 12.

Sudden Death Cook-Off Results
Sudden Death Cook-Off 5
Team		Judge's Scores						Total (out of 60)	Result
Team		Karen	Guy	Liz	Colin	Pete	Manu	Total (out of 60)	Result
VIC	Mark & Chris	5	5	6	5	5	5	31	Safe
Dishes	Entrée	Fettucinne Carbonara							Safe
Dishes	Main	Beef Fillet with Mushroom Gratin and Capsicum Purée							Safe
Dishes	Dessert	Peanut Butter Parfait with Salted Caramel Sauce							Safe
VIC	Caitie & Demi	4	4	4	4	4	4	24	Eliminated
Dishes	Entrée	Gnocchi with Sage and Burnt Butter Sauce							Eliminated
Dishes	Main	Pumpkin and Olive Risotto with Tempura Zucchini Flower							Eliminated
Dishes	Dessert	Italian Ricotta Pie with Raspberry Cream							Eliminated

=== Top 12 ===
==== People's Choice 3: Canapé Challenge ====
- Episode 27
- Airdate — 15 March
- Location — Carnival Spirit Cruise
- Description — Teams were on board the Carnival Spirit cruise ship to serve canapés for passengers. The passengers tried and voted for their favourite dish, the team with the most votes won Passenger's Choice. Judges Pete and Colin sent the two weakest teams to Sudden Death.

Challenge Summary
People's Choice 3
Team		Dish	Result
VIC	Court & Duncan	—N/a	Safe (Immunity)
QLD	Della & Tully	Seared Beef with Nori Butter	Passengers' Choice
NSW	David & Betty	Salmon Poke on Rice Paper Crisp	Safe (Through to Top 11)
VIC	Mark & Chris	Scallops in Prawn Bisque	Safe (Through to Top 11)
QLD	Valerie & Courtney	Spicy Chickpeas with Pan Seared Fish	Safe (Through to Top 11)
NSW	Mell & Cyn	Greek Lamb Cigars with Mint Yoghurt Sauce	Safe (Through to Top 11)
QLD	Amy & Tyson	Crispy Polenta Chip with Grilled Prawn and Lemon & Thyme Mayo	Safe (Through to Top 11)
QLD	Brett & Marie	Lobster and Mango Salad on Crispy Wonton	Safe (Through to Top 11)
VIC	Karen & Ros	Lemongrass Chicken Boats and Asian Salad	Safe (Through to Top 11)
SA	Tim & Kyle	Speck and Shiitake Mushroom Croquettes with Spicy Mayo	Safe (Through to Top 11)
WA	Josh & Amy	Grilled Thai Prawns with Paw Paw Salad and Vermicelli Noodles	Through to Sudden Death
NSW	Kelsey & Amanda	Prosciutto Wrapped Pear with Blue Cheese and Brandy Sauce	Through to Sudden Death

==== Sudden Death Cook-Off 6 ====
- Episode 28
- Airdate — 19 March
- Description — As the two weakest teams from the Canapé Challenge, Josh & Amy and Kelsey & Amanda have to compete against each other in a Sudden Death Cook-Off, where one team will be eliminated. The winning team goes through to the Top 11. This Sudden Death is also held on board the same ship as the previous challenge.

Sudden Death Cook-Off Results
Sudden Death Cook-Off 6
Team		Judge's Scores						Total (out of 60)	Result
Team		Karen	Guy	Liz	Colin	Pete	Manu	Total (out of 60)	Result
WA	Josh & Amy	5	4	5	5	4	5	28	Safe
Dishes	Entrée	Tempura Soft Shell Crab with Papaya Salad							Safe
Dishes	Main	Grilled Salmon with Couscous and Coriander Lemon Sauce							Safe
Dishes	Dessert	Apple and Berry Fry Pie							Safe
NSW	Kelsey & Amanda	4	4	5	4	4	5	26	Eliminated
Dishes	Entrée	Deep Fried Calamari with Mango & Avocado Salad and Lemon Aioli							Eliminated
Dishes	Main	Prawn Red Curry							Eliminated
Dishes	Dessert	Churros with Chocolate Sauce							Eliminated

=== Top 11 ===
==== People's Choice 4: Supermarket Sauce Challenge ====
- Episode 29
- Airdate — 20 March
- Location — Coles
- Description — Teams must create a meal and a sauce worth bottling for the grocery buying public. The team with the most votes wins People's Choice and will have their sauce produced, packaged and sold in Coles supermarkets across Australia and also be safe from the next two eliminations. Pete, Colin and guest judge Curtis Stone will decide the bottom two teams who will face Sudden Death.

Challenge Summary
People's Choice 4
Team		Dish	Result
QLD	Della & Tully	—N/a	Safe (Immunity)
QLD	Valerie & Courtney	Lamb with Sweet Spiced Ango-Indian Sauce	Shoppers' Choice
VIC	Karen & Ros	Crispy Pork Belly with Chicken & Pork Gravy and Fennel & Apple Salad	Safe (Through to Top 10)
NSW	David & Betty	Grilled Chicken with Peanut Satay Sauce	Safe (Through to Top 10)
SA	Tim & Kyle	Steak with Mushroom Sauce and Creamy Spinach	Safe (Through to Top 10)
QLD	Brett & Marie	Veal and Sausage with Tomato Sauce and Crispy Polenta	Safe (Through to Top 10)
VIC	Mark & Chris	Duck Breast with Spiced Orange	Safe (Through to Top 10)
QLD	Amy & Tyson	Crumbed Chicken with Smoky Chicken Gravy	Safe (Through to Top 10)
WA	Josh & Amy	Chilli Chicken Wrap with Peri Peri Sauce	Safe (Through to Top 10)
VIC	Court & Duncan	Pork Fillet with Lemon, Butter and Sage Sauce	Through to Sudden Death
NSW	Mell & Cyn	Pork Ribs with Smoky Caramel Sauce	Through to Sudden Death

==== Sudden Death Cook-Off 7 ====
- Episode 30
- Airdate — 21 March
- Description — As the two weakest teams from the Supermarket Sauce Challenge, Court & Duncan and Mell & Cyn have to compete against each other in a Sudden Death Cook-Off, where one team will be eliminated. The winning team goes through to the Top 10.

Sudden Death Cook-Off Results
Sudden Death Cook-Off 7
Team		Judge's Scores						Total (out of 60)	Result
Team		Karen	Guy	Liz	Colin	Pete	Manu	Total (out of 60)	Result
VIC	Court & Duncan	8	8	9	8	9	8	50	Safe
Dishes	Entrée	Fried Chicken with Pickles and Hot Sauce							Safe
Dishes	Main	Pork and Mushroom Broth with Soba Noodles							Safe
Dishes	Dessert	Yoghurt Panna Cotta, Berries and Chocolate							Safe
NSW	Mell & Cyn	5	6	6	6	6	5	34	Eliminated
Dishes	Entrée	Roasted Beetroot Risotto with Goat's Cheese and Thyme Oil							Eliminated
Dishes	Main	Beef Fillet with Tempura Oysters and Parsnip Puree							Eliminated
Dishes	Dessert	Vanilla Bean Ice-Cream with Passionfruit Curd and Tuiles							Eliminated

=== Top 10 ===
==== People's Choice 5: Street Party Challenge ====
- Episode 31
- Airdate — 22 March
- Location — Eat Street
- Description — Each team cooks out of shipping container kitchens where they set up their original instant restaurants and the customers are the residents on the street. Each resident will eat at any of the restaurants and rate their meal out of ten. The winning team will be safe from this elimination and also gets an advantage at the next challenge.

Challenge Summary
People's Choice 5
Team		Dish	Result
QLD	Valerie & Courtney	—N/a	Safe (Immunity)
SA	Tim & Kyle	Lamb with Mushy Peas and Onion Rings	Neighbours' Choice
QLD	Amy & Tyson	Chicken with Livers, Pumpkin and Onion	Safe (Through to Top 9)
WA	Josh & Amy	Seafood Laksa	Safe (Through to Top 9)
NSW	David & Betty	Grilled Lemongrass Pork with Spring Rolls and Vermicelli	Safe (Through to Top 9)
VIC	Court & Duncan	Lamb with Root Vegetables and Salsa Verde	Safe (Through to Top 9)
QLD	Della & Tully	Crispy Pork with Carrots and Caramel Sauce	Safe (Through to Top 9)
VIC	Karen & Ros	Beef Eye Fillet with Potatoes and Red Wine Jus	Safe (Through to Top 9)
QLD	Brett & Marie	Sarsaparilla Beef Cheeks with Cauliflower Purée	Through to Sudden Death
VIC	Mark & Chris	Snapper en Papillote in Broth	Through to Sudden Death

==== Sudden Death Cook-Off 8 ====
- Episode 32
- Airdate — 26 March
- Description — As the two weakest teams from the Street Party Challenge, Mark & Chris and Brett & Marie have to compete against each other in a Sudden Death Cook-Off, where one team will be eliminated. The winning team goes through to the Top 9.

Sudden Death Cook-Off Results
Sudden Death Cook-Off 8
Team		Judge's Scores						Total (out of 60)	Result
Team		Karen	Guy	Liz	Colin	Pete	Manu	Total (out of 60)	Result
VIC	Mark & Chris	8	8	8	7	8	8	47	Safe
Dishes	Entrée	Lobster with Bisque							Safe
Dishes	Main	Girello Cotoletta with Polenta and Broad Bean Salad							Safe
Dishes	Dessert	Pistachio Cannoli with Dark Chocolate Mousse							Safe
QLD	Brett & Marie	6	6	5	6	6	6	35	Eliminated
Dishes	Entrée	Sugar Seared Scallops with Tomato and Fig Salsa							Eliminated
Dishes	Main	Venison and Mushroom Roulade with Sweet Potato and Truffle Purée							Eliminated
Dishes	Dessert	Peanut Butter and Jelly Sandwich							Eliminated

=== Top 9 ===
==== Kitchen HQ: Finals Fast Track Challenge ====
- Episode 33
- Airdate — 27 March
- Description — In a three-round challenge, teams competed for the winning prize to head directly into the finals. In the first round, teams were required to plate a dish in just 3 minutes, using one protein and other available ingredients. Tim and Kyle, as their advantage, were able to sit out this round and also determine the order of the other teams plating. The best three teams, along with Tim and Kyle, advanced into the next round where each team cooked a dish in 45 minutes. Each team was allocated the same ingredients for this cook-off. Additionally team members were to cook separately for the first 30 minutes and then rejoin for the remaining 15 minutes to finish. Finally, the best two teams advanced into Round 3 for a luxury ingredient challenge where the winning team advanced straight to the finals. All remaining teams went into an Ultimate Instant Restaurant round.

Challenge Summary
Round 1: Plating Challenge
Team		Result	
SA	Tim & Kyle	Safe (Advantage)	
QLD	Amy & Tyson	Advance to Round 2	
VIC	Court & Duncan	Advance to Round 2	
QLD	Della & Tully	Advance to Round 2	
VIC	Karen & Ros	Through to Next Round	
VIC	Mark & Chris	Through to Next Round	
QLD	Valerie & Courtney	Through to Next Round	
NSW	David & Betty	Through to Next Round	
WA	Josh & Amy	Through to Next Round	
Round 2: Team Work Challenge
Team		Dish	Result
QLD	Amy & Tyson	Seared Salmon with Potato Purée and Minted Peas	Advance to Round 3
SA	Tim & Kyle	Confit Salmon with Pea Purée	Advance to Round 3
VIC	Court & Duncan	Roast Salmon with Thai Style Salad	Through to Next Round
QLD	Della & Tully	Crispy Skin Salmon with Crispy Potatoes and Leek Purée	Through to Next Round
Round 3: Luxury Ingredient Challenge
SA	Tim & Kyle	Rabbit Ragu Fettucine with Bone Marrow	Through to Finals
QLD	Amy & Tyson	Sea Urchin with Sushi Rice and Pickled Salad	Through to Next Round

==== Ultimate Instant Restaurant ====
- Episodes 34 to 41
- Airdate — 28 March to 17 April
- Description — With Tim & Kyle through to the finals, the remaining 8 teams headed around the country once again in an Ultimate Instant Restaurant round. All teams have to cook two dishes of each course (entrée, main and dessert) for their fellow contestants and judges for scoring. Guests have a choice of choosing one of the options per course, while the judges Pete and Manu each taste one of the two options. At the end of this round, the lowest scoring team is eliminated.

Colour Key:
– Judge's Score for Option 1
– Judge's Score for Option 2

Instant Restaurant Summary
Top 9
Team and Episode Details			Guest Scores								Pete's Scores			Manu's Scores			Total (out of 130)	Rank	Result
Team and Episode Details			V&C	A&T	D&T	M&C	C&D	K&R	D&B	J&A	Entrée	Main	Dessert	Entrée	Main	Dessert	Total (out of 130)	Rank	Result
QLD	Valerie & Courtney		—	8	7	8	7	8	7	8	9	7	5	7	10	8	99	1st	Safe
Ep 34	28 March		Tiffin Room																Safe
Dishes	Entrées	1	Spice Rubbed Lamb with Mint Chutney and Paratha Bread																Safe
Dishes	Entrées	2	Trio of Indian Tapas																Safe
Dishes	Mains	1	Fish Curry with Rice and Eggplant Pickle																Safe
Dishes	Mains	2	Spiced Duck with Jalfragie Sauce																Safe
Dishes	Desserts	1	Cardamon Panna Cotta with Ginger and Orange Syrup																Safe
Dishes	Desserts	2	Angoori Jamuns with Saffron and Rosewater Syrup																Safe
QLD	Amy & Tyson		6	—	6	6	5	7	5	4	5	8	10	4	9	8	83	4th	Safe
Ep 35	29 March		Mosaic																Safe
Dishes	Entrées	1	Duck Liver, Honey Lavender Butter																Safe
Dishes	Entrées	2	Scampi with Passionfruit, Coconut and Coriander																Safe
Dishes	Mains	1	Lamb Cutlets with Cauliflower and Rosemary Mint Gel																Safe
Dishes	Mains	2	Sesame Crusted Tuna with Dragonfruit and Radish Salad																Safe
Dishes	Desserts	1	G&T Pear																Safe
Dishes	Desserts	2	Braised Parsnip, Curry Lemon Curd, Basil Ice Cream																Safe
QLD	Della & Tully		6	8	—	6	6	6	6	7	9	4	4	10	7	9	88	2nd	Safe
Ep 36	2 April		Pepper Tree																Safe
Dishes	Entrées	1	Garlic Bugs with Onion and Leeks																Safe
Dishes	Entrées	2	Fried Barramundi with Roast Chilli and Herb Salad																Safe
Dishes	Mains	1	Pork Neck with Green Beans and Radishes																Safe
Dishes	Mains	2	Beef Short Ribs with Coconut Sauce and Prik Nam Pla																Safe
Dishes	Desserts	1	Chocolate Honeycomb Sundae																Safe
Dishes	Desserts	2	Lemon Brûlée Tart																Safe
VIC	Mark & Chris		6	5	6	—	6	6	7	8	5	2	7	9	3	8	78	5th	Safe
Ep 37	3 April		The 5th Quarter																Safe
Dishes	Entrées	1	Ricotta Gnocchi with Mushroom and Lemon Cream Sauce																Safe
Dishes	Entrées	2	Orange and Grapefruit Kingfish Carpaccio																Safe
Dishes	Mains	1	Porchetta with Pork, Fennel and Porcini Stuffing																Safe
Dishes	Mains	2	Pasta with Bolognaise Ragù																Safe
Dishes	Desserts	1	Bombolini with Raspberry Sorbet																Safe
Dishes	Desserts	2	Campari Sorbet with Pistachio Crumb and Vanilla Mascarpone																Safe
VIC	Court & Duncan		5	6	5	6	—	5	5	8	10	9	4	8	5	1	77	6th	Safe
Ep 38	4 April		Gastroturf																Safe
Dishes	Entrées	1	Snapper, Asparagus and Mussel Butter																Safe
Dishes	Entrées	2	Venison, Smoked Labne and Blackberries																Safe
Dishes	Mains	1	Chicken, Cauliflower Rice, Charred Carrots																Safe
Dishes	Mains	2	Pepperberry Roo, Eggplant and Spinach																Safe
Dishes	Desserts	1	Goats Cheese Profiterole, Thyme and Honey																Safe
Dishes	Desserts	2	Whiskey Sour																Safe
VIC	Karen & Ros		6	4	6	5	5	—	6	4	3	8	5	2	6	7	67	7th	Safe
Ep 39	5 April		Procreations																Safe
Dishes	Entrées	1	Zesty Prawn Tart with Asian Salad and Coriander Pesto																Safe
Dishes	Entrées	2	Crumbed Halloumi with Watermelon and Asparagus Salad																Safe
Dishes	Mains	1	Beef Cheeks with Parmesan Mash and Parsley Oil																Safe
Dishes	Mains	2	Hapuku with Saffron Vanilla Sauce																Safe
Dishes	Desserts	1	Chocolate Mousse with Coffee Crumble and Vanilla Ice Cream																Safe
Dishes	Desserts	2	Tangy Tiramisu																Safe
NSW	David & Betty		6	6	6	6	6	5	—	5	9	8	3	10	9	7	86	3rd	Safe
Ep 40	6 April		Anchor & Palms																Safe
Dishes	Entrées	1	Bo La Lot: Grilled Wagyu Beef in Betel Leaf																Safe
Dishes	Entrées	2	Banh Xeo Taco: Vietnamese Pancake Taco																Safe
Dishes	Mains	1	Or Lam: Lao Spicy Chicken Stew																Safe
Dishes	Mains	2	Seafood Sour Orange Curry																Safe
Dishes	Desserts	1	Flambe Mango in Orange & Whisky and Coconut Ice-Cream																Safe
Dishes	Desserts	2	Khao Sangkaya: Sweet Sticky Rice and Steamed Coconut Egg Custard																Safe
WA	Josh & Amy		19 (Note: Individual guest scores were not revealed.)							—	4	2	1	3	1	1	31	8th	Eliminated
Ep 41	17 April		Longshore Drift																Eliminated
Dishes	Entrées	1	Whitebait with Chilli Lime Mayo and Pickled Cucumber Salad																Eliminated
Dishes	Entrées	2	Seafood Chowder with Damper																Eliminated
Dishes	Mains	1	Pork Belly Adobo with Lime and Coriander Rice																Eliminated
Dishes	Mains	2	Blue Swimmer Crab with Citrus Spinach Salad																Eliminated
Dishes	Desserts	1	Koeksisters Meet Dom Pedro																Eliminated
Dishes	Desserts	2	Crema Catalana with Spanish Biscotti																Eliminated

=== Top 8 ===
==== Quarter Final 1: Daily Dining Challenge ====
- Episode 42
- Airdate — 18 April
- Description — For the start of the Quarter Finals round, the remaining eight teams cooked a breakfast dish against another team, where one was eliminated, based on the scoring of the previous round: i.e. Valerie & Courtney versus Karen & Ros, Della & Tully versus Court & Duncan, David & Betty versus Mark & Chris, and Amy & Tyson against the immunity team, Tim & Kyle. Pete and Manu chose four teams to be safe. The remaining teams cooked a lunch dish and the judges chose the two best teams to be safe. The bottom two teams went into a Sudden Death Cook-Off, where they had to cook a dinner dish. The team that produced the weakest dish was eliminated.

Challenge Summary
Round 1: Breakfast
Team		Dish	Result
QLD	Della & Tully	Potato Pancake with Salmon and Crème Fraîche	Judges' Choice
VIC	Mark & Chris	Poached Duck Egg with Charred Cauliflower and Speck Salad	Safe (Through to Top 7)
VIC	Karen & Ros	Corn Fritters with Scallops and Avocado Mash	Safe (Through to Top 7)
QLD	Amy & Tyson	Bubble and Squeak with Poached Egg and Maple Bacon	Safe (Through to Top 7)
VIC	Court & Duncan	Poached Egg with Smoked Salmon	Through to Round 2
NSW	David & Betty	Son-in-Law Egg with Chinese Sausage and Tamarind Chilli Jam	Through to Round 2
SA	Tim & Kyle	Corn and Spring Onion Fritter with Panko Crumbed Egg	Through to Round 2
QLD	Valerie & Courtney	Spicy Potatoes with Soft Boiled Egg and Maple Bacon	Through to Round 2
Round 2: Lunch
SA	Tim & Kyle	Crispy Skin Salmon with Ginger & Sweet Potato Purée and Asian Dressing	Safe (Through to Top 7)
QLD	Valerie & Courtney	Spicy Lamb Pot Pie with Coconut Mashed Potato	Safe (Through to Top 7)
VIC	Court & Duncan	Glazed Pork Fillet with Bean Salad and Capsicum Jam	Through to Round 3
NSW	David & Betty	Thai Beef Salad with Vermicelli Noodles	Through to Round 3
Round 3: Dinner
NSW	David & Betty	Vietnamese Beef Stew with Carrot Purée	Safe (Through to Top 7)
VIC	Court & Duncan	Lamb Rack with Peas and Beets	Eliminated

=== Top 7 ===
==== Quarter Final 2: Trio Challenge ====
- Episode 43
- Airdate — 19 April
- Description — The remaining teams chose one type of meat and created three different types of dishes using that particular meat. There were only four types of meat to choose from; beef, lamb, chicken and pork. A maximum of two teams could cook with the same meat. Della and Tully won the advantage from Quarter Final 1 so they got to decide the order in which each team could choose their meat (They chose first, followed by Karen and Ros, Mark and Chris, David and Betty, Valerie and Courtney, Amy and Tyson and Tim and Kyle ). The teams then had 90 minutes to cook their three dishes. The team with the best dish would win an advantage in the next challenge. The two weakest teams went through to Sudden Death to create a Trio of Desserts. The team with the weaker dish would be eliminated.

Challenge Summary
Round 1: Trio of Meats
Team		Ingredient	Dishes			Result
QLD	Amy & Tyson	Beef	Wagyu Steak with Onion Cream	Oxtail with Tarragon Mash	Crumbed Minute Steak	Judges' Choice
QLD	Valerie & Courtney	Lamb	Lamb Mulligatawny Soup	Lamb Masala Curry	Shish Kebab with Paratha	Safe (Through to Top 6)
NSW	David & Betty	Chicken	Banh Mi Chicken Taco	Larb Gai	Chicken Wonton Soup	Safe (Through to Top 6)
QLD	Della & Tully	Pork	Pork Belly with Sweet Potato	Pulled Pork Doughnut	Pork Fillet with Pea Purèe	Safe (Through to Top 6)
VIC	Mark & Chris	Chicken	Rolled Chicken Thigh	Chicken Wings	Chicken Lollipops	Safe (Through to Top 6)
VIC	Karen & Ros	Pork	Pork Shoulder with Polenta	Crispy Pork Belly	Pork Cutlet with Pickled Apple	Through to Round 2 (Sudden Death)
SA	Tim & Kyle	Beef	Spaghetti and Meatballs	Peppered Beef	Beef Parmigiana	Through to Round 2 (Sudden Death)

Round 2: Trio of Desserts
Team		Dessert Trio	Dishes			Result
SA	Tim & Kyle	Trio of Mousses	Yoghurt Mousse with Caramelised Pineapple and Balsamic Strawberries	Dark Chocolate Mousse with Pear and Sweet Dukkah	Ricotta Mousse with Grilled Peaches and Honey Thyme Syrup	Safe (Through to Top 6)
VIC	Karen & Ros	Trio of Chocolate	Fudgy Chocolate Cake with Raspberry Coulis	Chocolate Chilli Mousse with Raspberries	Chocolate Crumb with Balsamic Strawberries and Mascarpone	Eliminated

=== Top 6 ===
==== Quarter Final 3: Master the Disaster Challenge ====
- Episode 44
- Airdate — 23 April
- Description — The six remaining teams faced off in a redemption cook-off. In Round 1, teams were given a second chance to redeem themselves by mastering one of their biggest disasters throughout the competition. The specified dish did not have to be replicated exactly, but needed to have the same fundamentals of their previous dish. Amy and Tyson won the advantage from the previous challenge, and were awarded with 10 more minutes of cooking time compared to the standard 90 minutes. The strongest dish won an advantage in the next challenge, and the two weakest teams faced off in Round 2. They had to cook a dish that best describes them, worthy of a Grand Final. The team with the weaker dish was eliminated.

Challenge Summary
Round 1
Team		Dish	Result
SA	Tim & Kyle	Hock and Mushroom Croquettes with Mushroom Mayo	Judges' Choice
QLD	Amy & Tyson	Mexican Beef Taco	Safe (Through to Top 5)
VIC	Mark & Chris	Japanese Snapper en Papillote	Safe (Through to Top 5)
NSW	David & Betty	Matcha Garden	Safe (Through to Top 5)
QLD	Della & Tully	Charred Quail with Couscous and Quince Jus	Through to Round 2 (Sudden Death)
QLD	Valerie & Courtney	Carrot Halwa Tart	Through to Round 2 (Sudden Death)

Round 2
Team		Dishes	Result
QLD	Valerie & Courtney	Masala Beef Shin with Lentils	Safe (Through to Top 5)
QLD	Della & Tully	Miso Wagyu with Bone Marrow and Tempura Vegetables	Eliminated

=== Top 5 ===
==== Quarter Final 4: Three Course Challenge ====
- Episode 45
- Airdate — 24 April
- Description — In order to progress to the Semi-Finals, the five remaining teams faced off in a rapid cook-off. In Round 1, teams had to cook and serve a Three Course Meal within 90 minutes. Tim & Kyle won the advantage from the previous challenge, which granted them with ample time to choose their ingredients from the storeroom without any time constraints. The strongest team won an advantage in the Semi-Finals, being able to compete against a team of their choice. The two weakest teams faced off in Round 2, where they had to cook their "signature dish", worthy of the last spot in the Semi Finals. The team with the weaker dish was eliminated.

Challenge Summary
Round 1: Three Course Meal
Team		Dishes			Result
Team		Entree	Main	Dessert	Result
QLD	Amy & Tyson	Coconut Poached Chicken	Crispy Skin Mackerel with Pickled Zucchini	Peaches and Cream	Judges' Choice
NSW	David & Betty	Thai Coconut Mussels	Snapper with Green Apple Salad	Kaffir Lime Pudding	Safe (Through to Semi-Finals)
QLD	Valerie & Courtney	Spice Crusted Salmon	Chicken Biriyani with Pepper Water	Mango Kheer	Safe (Through to Semi-Finals)
VIC	Mark & Chris	Tuna Rice Paper Rolls	Braised Pork with Scallops	Piña Colada	Through to Round 2 (Sudden Death)
SA	Tim & Kyle	Salt and Pepper Squid	Steak with Salsa Verde	Lemon Panna Cotta	Through to Round 2 (Sudden Death)

Round 2: Signature Dish
Team		Dishes	Result
SA	Tim & Kyle	Beef Cheeks with Cauliflower and Bone Marrow Gravy	Safe (Through to Semi-Finals)
VIC	Mark & Chris	Beef Rib Chilli with Charred Corn and Guacamole	Eliminated

=== Semi-finals ===
==== Semi-final 1 ====
- Episode 46
- Airdate — 25 April
- Description — Amy & Tyson take on David & Betty in the first Semi-Final Cook-Off. The lower scoring team is eliminated and the winner proceeds through to the Grand Final, with a chance of winning the $250,000 prize.

Semi-Final Cook-Off Results
Semi-Final 1
Team		Judge's Scores						Total (out of 60)	Result
Team		Karen	Guy	Liz	Colin	Pete	Manu	Total (out of 60)	Result
QLD	Amy & Tyson	9	9	8	8	9	8	51	Through to Grand Final
Dishes	Entrée	Squab with Kale, Almonds and Onion Cream							Through to Grand Final
Dishes	Main	Ducks and Turnips							Through to Grand Final
Dishes	Dessert	Pimms & Ginger Jelly with Cucumber Sorbet and Pickled Cucumber							Through to Grand Final
NSW	David & Betty	8	8	8	9	8	8	49	Eliminated
Dishes	Entrée	Vietnamese Sugarcane Prawns							Eliminated
Dishes	Main	Twice Cooked Pork with Pumpkin Purée and Nashi Pear							Eliminated
Dishes	Dessert	Mango Sorbet with Sticky Rice							Eliminated

==== Semi-final 2 ====
- Episode 47
- Airdate — 26 April
- Description — Valerie & Courtney take on Tim & Kyle in the second Semi-Final Cook-Off. The lower scoring team is eliminated and the winner proceeds through to the Grand Final, with a chance of winning the $250,000 prize.

Semi-Final Cook-Off Results
Semi-Final 2
Team		Judge's Scores						Total (out of 60)	Result
Team		Karen	Guy	Liz	Colin	Pete	Manu	Total (out of 60)	Result
QLD	Valerie & Courtney	9	8	9	8	8	8	50	Through to Grand Final
Dishes	Entrée	Peppered Chicken Livers with Fennel and Tomato Chutney							Through to Grand Final
Dishes	Main	Oxtail Stew with Pickled Onion Mash and Eggplant Kasundi							Through to Grand Final
Dishes	Dessert	Cardamom Dumplings with Saffron Crème Anglaise							Through to Grand Final
SA	Tim & Kyle	8	8	7	7	8	8	46	Eliminated
Dishes	Entrée	Scallops with Celeriac Purée and Pancetta							Eliminated
Dishes	Main	Confit Duck with Coffee Pumpkin Purée							Eliminated
Dishes	Dessert	Brownie with Chocolate Stout Mousse and Coffee Syrup							Eliminated

=== Grand Final ===
- Episode 48
- Airdate — 30 April
- Description — The top two teams face off in the Grand Final. Each team cooks a five course meal, with 20 plates per course, totalling 100 plates of food per team. This is then served to eliminated teams, friends and family. The guest judges return for the final verdict of awarding the $250,000 prize to the winners. The teams also wear proper chef attire and have their Instant Restaurant represented.

Grand Final Results
Grand Final
Team		Judge's Scores						Total (out of 60)	Result
Team		Karen	Guy	Liz	Colin	Pete	Manu	Total (out of 60)	Result
QLD	Amy & Tyson	10	9	10	9	10	9	57	Winners
Dishes		Mosaic							Winners
1st Course		Parmesan and Truffle Mousse with Mushrooms							Winners
2nd Course		Pea and Ham Soup							Winners
3rd Course		Butter Poached Marron with Jerusalem Artichoke and Rhubarb							Winners
4th Course		Veal, Sweetbreads and Marrow							Winners
5th Course		After Dinner Mint							Winners
QLD	Valerie & Courtney	9	9	9	8	9	8	52	Runners-up
Dishes		Tiffin Room							Runners-up
1st Course		Samosa Crisp with Chat							Runners-up
2nd Course		Salmon Tikka Skewers with Coriander & Pea Soup							Runners-up
3rd Course		Spiced Spanish Mackerel with Khichdi							Runners-up
4th Course		Pork Vindaloo with Turmeric Cabbage and Beetroot Raita							Runners-up
5th Course		Pistachio Kulfi							Runners-up

== Ratings ==
Colour Key:
– Highest Rating
– Lowest Rating
– Elimination Episode
– Finals Week

Week.	Episode		Air date	Viewers (millions) (Note: Ratings data used is from OzTAM and represents the live and same day average viewership from the 5 largest Australian metropolitan centres (Sydney, Melbourne, Brisbane, Perth and Adelaide).)	Nightly rank	Source
1	1	Instant Restaurant 1-1: Damo & Caz	Monday, 30 January	1.309	#1	
1	2	Instant Restaurant 1-2: David & Betty	Tuesday, 31 January	1.193	#1	
1	3	Instant Restaurant 1-3: Karen & Ros	Wednesday, 1 February	1.113	#1	
2	4	Instant Restaurant 1-4: Bek & Ash	Sunday, 5 February	1.193	#1	
2	5	Instant Restaurant 1-5: Tim & Kyle	Monday, 6 February	1.340	#1	
2	6	Instant Restaurant 1-6: Amy & Tyson	Tuesday, 7 February	1.410	#1	
2	7	Sudden Death Cook-Off 1	Wednesday, 8 February	1.201	#1	
3	8	Instant Restaurant 2-1: Albert & Dave	Sunday, 12 February	1.075	#2	
3	9	Instant Restaurant 2-2: Kelsey & Amanda	Monday, 13 February	1.150	#1	
3	10	Instant Restaurant 2-3: Court & Duncan	Tuesday, 14 February	1.023	#2	
3	11	Instant Restaurant 2-4: Josh & Amy	Wednesday, 15 February	1.078	#1	
4	12	Instant Restaurant 2-5: Della & Tully	Sunday, 19 February	1.236	#1	
4	13	Instant Restaurant 2-6: Alyse & Matt	Monday, 20 February	1.363	#1	
4	14	Sudden Death Cook-Off 2	Tuesday, 21 February	1.252	#1	
4	15	Instant Restaurant 3-1: Mark & Chris	Wednesday, 22 February	1.166	#1	
5	16	Instant Restaurant 3-2: Caitie & Demi	Sunday, 26 February	1.098	#2	
5	17	Instant Restaurant 3-3: Lama & Sarah	Monday, 27 February	1.120	#1	
5	18	Instant Restaurant 3-4: Brett & Marie	Tuesday, 28 February	1.048	#3	
5	19	Instant Restaurant 3-5: Valerie & Courtney	Wednesday, 1 March	1.105	#1	
6	20	Instant Restaurant 3-6: Mell & Cyn	Sunday, 5 March	1.059	#2	
6	21	Sudden Death Cook-Off 3	Monday, 6 March	1.047	#2	
6	22	Top 15: Kitchen HQ - Cookbook Challenge	Tuesday, 7 March	1.052	#2	
6	23	Top 14: People's Choice - Beach BBQ Challenge	Wednesday, 8 March	1.016	#1	
7	24	Sudden Death Cook-Off 4	Sunday, 12 March	0.961	#4	
7	25	Top 13: People's Choice - Baking For Bikers Challenge	Monday, 13 March	0.968	#8	
7	26	Sudden Death Cook-Off 5	Tuesday, 14 March	1.037	#2	
7	27	Top 12: People's Choice - Canapé Challenge	Wednesday, 15 March	1.078	#1	
8	28	Sudden Death Cook-Off 6	Sunday, 19 March	1.020	#3	
8	29	Top 11: People's Choice - Supermarket Sauce Challenge	Monday, 20 March	1.072	#2	
8	30	Sudden Death Cook-Off 7	Tuesday, 21 March	1.115	#2	
8	31	Top 10: People's Choice - Street Party Challenge	Wednesday, 22 March	1.137	#1	
9	32	Sudden Death Cook-Off 8	Sunday, 26 March	1.114	#2	
9	33	Top 9: Kitchen HQ - Finals Fast Track Challenge	Monday, 27 March	1.254	#1	
9	34	Ultimate Instant Restaurant 1: Valerie & Courtney	Tuesday, 28 March	1.236	#1	
9	35	Ultimate Instant Restaurant 2: Amy & Tyson	Wednesday, 29 March	1.436	#1	
10	36	Ultimate Instant Restaurant 3: Della & Tully	Sunday, 2 April	1.252	#2	
10	37	Ultimate Instant Restaurant 4: Mark & Chris	Monday, 3 April	1.210	#2	
10	38	Ultimate Instant Restaurant 5: Court & Duncan	Tuesday, 4 April	1.301	#1	
10	39	Ultimate Instant Restaurant 6: Karen & Ros	Wednesday, 5 April	1.337	#1	
10	40	Ultimate Instant Restaurant 7: David & Betty	Thursday, 6 April	1.226	#1	
11	41	Ultimate Instant Restaurant 8: Josh & Amy	Monday, 17 April	1.654	#1	
11	42	Top 8: Quarter Final 1 - Daily Dining Challenge	Tuesday, 18 April	1.313	#1	
11	43	Top 7: Quarter Final 2 - Trio Challenge	Wednesday, 19 April	1.207	#1	
12	44	Top 6: Quarter Final 3 - Master the Disaster Challenge	Sunday, 23 April	1.260	#1	
12	45	Top 5: Quarter Final 4 - Three Course Challenge	Monday, 24 April	1.022	#6	
12	46	Semi-Final 1	Tuesday, 25 April	1.219	#3	
12	47	Semi-Final 2	Wednesday, 26 April	1.237	#1	
13	48	Grand Final	Sunday, 30 April	1.392	#2	
13	48	Grand Final - Winner Announced	Sunday, 30 April	1.482	#1	
