= My Kitchen Rules series 7 =

My Kitchen Rules
- Series 7
- No. of episodes: 48

Release
- Original network: Seven Network
- Original release: 1 February – 26 April 2016

Season chronology
- ← Previous; Series 6 (2015) Next → Series 8 (2017)

The seventh season of the Australian competitive cooking game show My Kitchen Rules premiered on 1 February 2016.

== Teams ==
State		Group	Members	Relationship	Status
Victoria	VIC	2	Tasia & Gracia	Sisters	Winners 26 April (Grand Final)
South Australia	SA	3	Carmine & Lauren	Married	Runners-up 26 April (Grand Final)
Western Australia	WA	1	Anna & Jordan	Mother and Son	Eliminated 25 April (Semi-Finals)
Victoria	VIC	1	Gianni & Zana	Married Lawyers	Eliminated 21 April (Semi-Finals)
Victoria	VIC	1	Mitch & Laura	Siblings	Eliminated 20 April (Top 5: UIR)
New South Wales	NSW	3	Chris & Anthony	Dads	Eliminated 12 April (Top 6)
Victoria	VIC	3	Eve & Jason	Soulmates	Eliminated 11 April (Top 7)
South Australia	SA	1	Rosie & Paige	Best Mates	Eliminated 6 April (Top 8)
Queensland	QLD	3	Mike & Tarq	Father and Son	Eliminated 4 April (Top 9)
Queensland	QLD	2	Alex & Gareth	Miners	Eliminated 29 March (Top 10)
Queensland	QLD	2	JP & Nelly	Lovebirds	Eliminated 23 March (Top 11)
New South Wales	NSW	2	Luciano & Martino	Italianos	Eliminated 21 March (Top 12)
Western Australia	WA	2	Nev & Kell	Tradie and Cleaner	Eliminated 15 March (Top 13)
Queensland	QLD	3	Hazel & Lisa	Stepsies	Eliminated 13 March (IR: Round 4)
New South Wales	NSW	1	Monique & Sarah	Cops	Eliminated 13 March (IR: Round 4)
New Zealand	NZ	3	Tim & Dee	Happily Married	Eliminated 1 March (IR: Round 3)
Victoria	VIC	2	Jessica & Marcos	Fitness Friends	Eliminated 21 February (IR: Round 2)
Queensland	QLD	1	Cheryl & Matt	Cougar and Cub	Eliminated 9 February (IR: Round 1)

== Elimination history ==
Teams' Competition Progress
Round:	Instant Restaurant				Top 13	Top 12	Top 11	Top 10	Top 9	Top 8	Top 7	Top 6	Top 5	Semi-Finals		Grand Final
Round:	1	2	3	4^{1}	Top 13	Top 12	Top 11	Top 10	Top 9	Top 8	Top 7	Top 6	UIR	1	2	Grand Final
Teams:	Progress															
Tasia & Gracia	—N/a	**3rd** (61)	—N/a	—N/a	**HQ**; Safe	**PC**; Safe	**PC**; Safe	**Families'**; **Choice**	**Immune**	**PC**; Safe	**PC**; Safe	**HQ**; Safe	**1st** (85)	**1st** (55)	—N/a	**Winners** (57)
Carmine & Lauren	—N/a	—N/a	**5th** (51)	**1st** (+24)	**SD**; Safe	**PC**; Safe	**Fishermen's**; **Choice**	**Immune**	**HQ**; Safe	**PC**; Safe	**SD** (46)	**SD**; Safe	**2nd** (77)	—N/a	**1st** (46)	**Runners-up** (51)
Anna & Jordan	**2nd** (94)	—N/a	—N/a	—N/a	**PC**; Safe	**Athletes'**; **Choice**	**Immune**	**PC**; Safe	**PC**; Safe	**PC**; Safe	**Chefs'**; **Choice**	**HQ**; Safe	**3rd** (72)	—N/a	**2nd** (36)	**Eliminated** (Episode 47)
Gianni & Zana	**1st** (97)	—N/a	—N/a	—N/a	**Immune**	**SD** (45)	**PC**; Safe	**PC**; Safe	**PC**; Safe	**SD** (44)	**PC**; Safe	**HQ**; Safe	**4th** (71)	**2nd** (43)	**Eliminated** (Episode 46)	
Mitch & Laura	**3rd** (89)	—N/a	—N/a	—N/a	**Judges'**; **Choice**	**Immune**	**PC**; Safe	**PC**; Safe	**Riders'**; **Choice**	**Immune**	**PC**; Safe	**HQ**; Safe	**5th** (60)	**Eliminated** (Episode 45)		
Chris & Cookie	—N/a	—N/a	**1st** (87)	—N/a	**Immune**	**PC**; Safe	**PC**; Safe	**PC**; Safe	**HQ**; Safe	**Customers'**; **Choice**	**Immune**	**SD**; Lose	**Eliminated** (Episode 40)			
Eve & Jason	—N/a	—N/a	**3rd** (59)	—N/a	**PC**; Safe	**PC**; Safe	**PC**; Safe	**PC**; Safe	**SD** (41)	**PC**; Safe	**SD** (35)	**Eliminated** (Episode 39)				
Rosie & Paige	**5th** (59)	—N/a	—N/a	**2nd** (+20)	**PC**; Safe	**PC**; Safe	**Out**^{2} —	**SD** (52)	**PC**; Safe	**SD** (39)	**Eliminated** (Episode 37)					
Mike & Tarq	—N/a	—N/a	**2nd** (80)	—N/a	**PC**; Safe	**PC**; Safe	**PC**; Safe	**PC**; Safe	**SD** (39)	**Eliminated** (Episode 35)						
Alex & Gareth	—N/a	**4th** (60)	—N/a	**4th** (+9)	**HQ**; Safe	**PC**; Safe	**SD** (29)	**SD** (49)	**Eliminated** (Episode 32)							
JP & Nelly	—N/a	**2nd** (85)	—N/a	—N/a	**HQ**; Safe	**PC**; Safe	**SD** (27)	**Eliminated** (Episode 30)								
Luciano & Martino	—N/a	**1st** (95)	—N/a	—N/a	**Immune**	**SD** (41)	**Eliminated** (Episode 28)									
Nev & Kell	—N/a	**5th** (56)	—N/a	**3rd** (+15)	**SD**; Lose	**Eliminated** (Episode 26)										
Hazel & Lisa	—N/a	—N/a	**4th** (57)	**5th** (+6)	**Eliminated** (Episode 24)											
Monique & Sarah	**4th** (68)	—N/a	—N/a	**6th** (-6)	**Eliminated** (Episode 24)											
Tim & Dee	—N/a	—N/a	**6th** (32)	**Eliminated** (Episode 18)												
Jessica & Marcos	—N/a	**6th** (38)	**Eliminated** (Episode 12)													
Cheryl & Matt	**6th** (31)	**Eliminated** (Episode 6)														

Cell descriptions
	Team won a challenge, People's Choice, cooked the best dish or received the highest score for the round.
	Team lost a challenge, cooked the weakest dish or received a low score and must compete in an additional round or challenge.
Safe	Team became safe from elimination after winning/passing a challenge. (If applicable, team was safe after the challenge listed in bold); **PC** = People's Choice, **HQ** = Kitchen Headquarters challenge, **SD** = Sudden Death
**SD**	Team competed in a Sudden Death cook-off and became safe from elimination.
**SD**	Team was eliminated after losing in a Sudden Death cook-off or round.
Immune	From winning the previous challenge, team was immune from elimination and was not required to participate.
—N/a	Results do not apply as the team was not allocated to this challenge or round.

Note:

- **^1** - The final scores for this round was determined by the difference in points from team's first Instant restaurant score to their current score
- **^2** - Due to an accident off camera, Rosie and Paige were unable cook in this challenge for safety reasons.

== Competition details ==
=== Instant Restaurants ===
During the Instant Restaurant rounds, each team hosts a three-course dinner for judges and fellow teams in their allocated group. They are scored and ranked among their group, with the lowest scoring team being eliminated.

==== Round 1 ====
- Episodes 1 to 6
- Airdate — 1 February to 9 February
- Description — The first of the two instant restaurant groups are introduced into the competition in Round 1. The lowest scoring team at the end of this round is eliminated.

Instant Restaurant Summary
Group 1
Team and Episode Details		Guest Scores						Pete's Scores			Manu's Scores			Total (out of 110)	Rank	Result
Team and Episode Details		M&S	M&L	C&M	R&P	A&J	G&Z	Entrée	Main	Dessert	Entrée	Main	Dessert	Total (out of 110)	Rank	Result
NSW	Monique & Sarah	-	6	6	6	6	6	7	6	6	7	5	7	68	4th	Through to Round 4
Ep 1	1 February	Crime & Nourishment														Through to Round 4
Dishes	Entree	Caramelised Onion, Roasted Beetroot & Goats’ Cheese Tart														Through to Round 4
Dishes	Main	Crispy Skinned Salmon with Thrice Cooked Chips and Lemon & Dill Sauce														Through to Round 4
Dishes	Dessert	Sticky Fig & Date Pudding with Butterscotch & White Chocolate Coconut Rum Sauces														Through to Round 4
VIC	Mitch & Laura	7	-	8	9	9	8	7	8	9	6	8	10	89	3rd	Safe
Ep 2	2 February	The Pines														Safe
Dishes	Entree	Smoked Venison														Safe
Dishes	Main	Roasted Wild Boar														Safe
Dishes	Dessert	Black Forest Mousse Cake														Safe
QLD	Cheryl & Matt	4	4	-	3	3	3	3	3	1	4	2	1	31	6th	Eliminated
Ep 3	3 February	The Odd Couple														Eliminated
Dishes	Entree	Chicken Caesar Salad														Eliminated
Dishes	Main	Grilled Swordfish with Pea Purée and Tarragon Sauce														Eliminated
Dishes	Dessert	Chocolate Seduction Pudding with Poached Pears and Cinnamon Ice-Cream														Eliminated
SA	Rosie & Paige	4	7	4	-	6	5	6	5	5	7	5	5	59	5th	Through to Round 4
Ep 4	7 February	Big Love Grub														Through to Round 4
Dishes	Entree	Lamb Backstrap with Pickled Beetroot and Chive Crème Fraiche														Through to Round 4
Dishes	Main	Chicken, Leek & Zucchini Pie with Minty Mushy Peas														Through to Round 4
Dishes	Dessert	Grandma's Gingerbread with Rum & Raisin Ice-Cream														Through to Round 4
WA	Anna & Jordan	9	8	9	8	-	9	7	9	9	7	10	9	94	2nd	Safe
Ep 5	8 February	Mama Knows Best														Safe
Dishes	Entree	Baby Octopus with Spiced Pork Sausage, Potato and Salsa Verde														Safe
Dishes	Main	Dad's Braised Rabbit with Pappardelle														Safe
Dishes	Dessert	Imqaret with Orange Blossom Ice-Cream														Safe
VIC	Gianni & Zana	8	9	8	9	8	-	10	10	8	10	9	8	97	1st	Safe
Ep 6	9 February	Monte Nero														Safe
Dishes	Entree	Albanian Pita with Beetroot Hummus														Safe
Dishes	Main	Crumbed Calves Livers with Albanian Peppers														Safe
Dishes	Dessert	Krofne with Hazelnut Ganache														Safe

==== Round 2 ====
- Episodes 7 to 12
- Airdate — 10 February to 21 February.
- Description — The second group now start their Instant Restaurant round. The same rules from the previous round apply and the lowest scoring team is eliminated.

Instant Restaurant Summary
Group 2
Team and Episode Details		Guest Scores						Pete's Scores			Manu's Scores			Total (out of 110)	Rank	Result
Team and Episode Details		A&G	L&M	T&G	J&N	N&K	J&M	Entrée	Main	Dessert	Entrée	Main	Dessert	Total (out of 110)	Rank	Result
QLD	Alex & Gareth	-	5	6	5	4	5	4	8	6	5	8	4	60	4th	Through to Round 4
Ep 7	10 February	Garden of Mine														Through to Round 4
Dishes	Entree	Miang of Crab, Coconut, Mint and Citrus														Through to Round 4
Dishes	Main	Roast Duck with Lychee Red Curry and Cauliflower Rice														Through to Round 4
Dishes	Dessert	Chocolate Lava Cake with White Chocolate Sauce														Through to Round 4
NSW	Luciano & Martino	8	-	8	8	8	9	10	8	10	10	7	9	95	1st	Safe
Ep 8	14 February	La Bella Vita														Safe
Dishes	Entree	Fettuccine con Salsiccia & Funghi Porcini														Safe
Dishes	Main	Osso Bucco e Risotto alla Milanese														Safe
Dishes	Dessert	Pastiera Napoletana alla Ricotta														Safe
VIC	Tasia & Gracia	4	6	-	3	3	4	5	8	9	5	5	9	61	3rd	Safe
Ep 9	15 February	Mortar & Pestle														Safe
Dishes	Entree	Grilled Fish Cakes in Banana Leaves with Peanut Sauce														Safe
Dishes	Main	Ribs and Chips														Safe
Dishes	Dessert	Black Rice Pudding														Safe
QLD	JP & Nelly	8	8	7	-	8	7	9	9	5	9	9	6	85	2nd	Safe
Ep 10	16 February	The Sandy Teapot														Safe
Dishes	Entree	Potato and Cheese Pierogi with Bacon and Sage Butter														Safe
Dishes	Main	Rib Eye Steak with Celeriac Mash and Lapsang Souchong Barbecue Sauce														Safe
Dishes	Dessert	Chai Infused Crème Brûlée														Safe
WA	Nev & Kel	4	4	5	7	-	3	9	6	2	9	6	1	56	5th	Through to Round 4
Ep 11	17 February	Secrets														Through to Round 4
Dishes	Entree	Seared Scallops with Corn Purée and Crumbed Crackling														Through to Round 4
Dishes	Main	Apple Cider Pork Belly with Fennel Chips, Honey Carrots and Gravy														Through to Round 4
Dishes	Dessert	Apple Pie with Vanilla Ice-Cream														Through to Round 4
VIC	Jessica & Marcos	2	3	3	2	1	-	4	7	3	4	7	2	38	6th	Eliminated
Ep 12	21 February	The Upper Cut														Eliminated
Dishes	Entree	Herb and Zucchini Fritters with Fennel Flatbread and Yoghurt Sauce														Eliminated
Dishes	Main	Stained Glass Lasagne with Mushroom Ragù														Eliminated
Dishes	Dessert	Spiced Carrot and Pineapple Cake with Carrot & Ginger Jelly														Eliminated

==== Round 3 ====
- Episodes 13 to 18
- Airdate — 22 February to 1 March..

Instant Restaurant Summary
Group 3
Team and Episode Details		Guest Scores						Colin's Scores			Rachel's Scores			Total (out of 110)	Rank	Result
Team and Episode Details		E&J	C&L	M&T	H&L	C&C	T&D	Entrée	Main	Dessert	Entrée	Main	Dessert	Total (out of 110)	Rank	Result
VIC	Eve & Jason	-	6	5	4	6	5	5	3	7	6	4	8	59	3rd	Safe
Ep 13	22 February	Bread & Brew														Safe
Dishes	Entree	Herb Crusted Rainbow Trout in Fish Broth														Safe
Dishes	Main	Mediterranean Rolled Leg of Lamb with Roast Vegetables														Safe
Dishes	Dessert	Stout and Chocolate Pudding														Safe
SA	Carmine & Lauren	3	-	5	6	4	3	6	1	7	7	1	8	51	5th	Through to Round 4
Ep 14	23 February	Number 32														Through to Round 4
Dishes	Entree	Zucchini Involtini with Homemade Ricotta														Through to Round 4
Dishes	Main	Seafood Spaghetti in a Bag														Through to Round 4
Dishes	Dessert	Rum Baba with Lemon Custard														Through to Round 4
QLD	Mike & Tarq	7	5	-	8	8	8	7	7	7	7	8	8	80	2nd	Safe
Ep 15	24 February	Island Thyme														Safe
Dishes	Entree	Sugar Cane Prawns with Green Pawpaw Salad and Red Pawpaw Dipping Sauce														Safe
Dishes	Main	Lamb Saag with Coconut Sambal and Roti														Safe
Dishes	Dessert	Baked Piña Colada														Safe
QLD	Hazel & Lisa	5	2	5	-	5	5	4	6	7	4	6	8	57	4th	Through to Round 4
Ep 16	28 February	Zesty														Through to Round 4
Dishes	Entree	Salmon Croquettes with Lime Aioli														Through to Round 4
Dishes	Main	Beef Wellington with Potato Galette and Green Beans														Through to Round 4
Dishes	Dessert	Citrus Polenta Yoghurt Cake with Pistachio Ice-Cream														Through to Round 4
NSW	Chris & Cookie	9	8	7	8	-	8	7	9	7	8	9	7	87	1st	Safe
Ep 17	29 February	Sand & Steel														Safe
Dishes	Entree	Twice Baked Cheese Souffle														Safe
Dishes	Main	Prosciutto Wrapped Pork Fillet with Potato Purée and Honey Sage Jus														Safe
Dishes	Dessert	Chocolate Mousse with Hazelnut Praline and Raspberry Coulis														Safe
NSW	Tim & Dee	2	1	3	2	3	-	2	2	6	3	2	6	32	6th	Eliminated
Ep 18	1 March	Buen Viaje														Eliminated
Dishes	Entree	Lentejas with Chorizo														Eliminated
Dishes	Main	Albondigas con Patatas Bravas														Eliminated
Dishes	Dessert	Flan de Huevo														Eliminated

==== Round 4: Redemption Round ====
- Episodes 19 to 24
- Airdate — 2 March to 13 March
- Description — The 4th and 5th placed teams from each of the previous three rounds must compete in a fourth Instant Restaurant Redemption round. At the end of this round, two teams are eliminated. Unlike the previous rounds, the final result was not determined by the rankings of the current scores. A twist was revealed where the teams were safe or eliminated based on the difference between scores from their first round to their current score from this round.

Instant Restaurant Summary
Redemption Round
Team and Episode Details		Guest Scores						Pete's Scores			Manu's Scores			Total (out of 110)	Difference	Rank	Result
Team and Episode Details		N&K	M&S	H&L	A&G	R&P	C&L	Entrée	Main	Dessert	Entrée	Main	Dessert	Total (out of 110)	Difference	Rank	Result
WA	Nev & Kell	-	6	6	9	6	7	1	7	10	2	7	10	71	+15	3rd	Safe
Ep 19	2 March	Secrets															Safe
Dishes	Entree	Grilled Marron with Lemon and Dill Butter															Safe
Dishes	Main	Eye Fillet with Sweet Potato Mash and Red Wine Jus															Safe
Dishes	Dessert	Baked Vanilla Cheesecake															Safe
NSW	Monique & Sarah	3	-	5	5	5	4	4	8	8	5	7	8	62	-6	6th	Eliminated
Ep 20	6 March	Crime & Nourishment															Eliminated
Dishes	Entree	Pea and Ham Soup with Homemade Bread Roll															Eliminated
Dishes	Main	Rabbit Pie with Spinach, Feta and Stewed Pear Salad															Eliminated
Dishes	Dessert	Profiteroles															Eliminated
QLD	Hazel & Lisa	4	5	-	5	6	5	8	7	3	9	6	5	63	+6	5th	Eliminated
Ep 21	7 March	Zesty															Eliminated
Dishes	Entree	Pan Seared Duck Breast with Baby Beets and Rhubarb Chutney															Eliminated
Dishes	Main	Crumbed Snapper with Thrice Cooked Chips, Lime Mayo and Asian Slaw															Eliminated
Dishes	Dessert	Zesty Lime Cream Pie with Lemon Sorbet															Eliminated
QLD	Alex & Gareth	7	5	5	-	7	7	5	9	4	6	9	5	69	+9	4th	Safe
Ep 22	8 March	Garden of Mine															Safe
Dishes	Entree	Spanish Mackerel Ceviche with Chorizo															Safe
Dishes	Main	Fennel Crusted Pork Belly with Five Spice Pineapple and Cherry Sauce															Safe
Dishes	Dessert	Chocolate Tart with Raspberry and Blueberry Cream															Safe
SA	Rosie & Paige	5	6	3	10	-	7	9	7	8	8	8	8	79	+20	2nd	Safe
Ep 23	9 March	Big Love Grub															Safe
Dishes	Entree	Spiced Lamb Filo Rolls with Yoghurt Sauce															Safe
Dishes	Main	Chicken Shawarma with Hummus and Flatbread															Safe
Dishes	Dessert	Orange and Almond Syrup Cake															Safe
SA	Carmine & Lauren	5	7	7	7	7	-	9	7	4	10	7	5	75	+24	1st	Safe
Ep 24	13 March	Number 32															Safe
Dishes	Entree	Saffron Cockles and Mussels with Croutons															Safe
Dishes	Main	Oven Baked Lamb Shank on Soft Polenta with Gremolata															Safe
Dishes	Dessert	Lauren's Famous Mud Cake															Safe

=== Top 13 ===
==== People's Choice 1: RSL Buffet Challenge ====
- Episode 25
- Airdate — 14 March
- Location — North Ryde RSL
- Description — In the first challenge, teams were split into two groups each cooking a buffet meal for public guests at the North Ryde RSL. Both groups selected a theme for their buffet and the guests paid for what they think the group's buffet was worth. The group with the most money won the collective People's Choice whilst the losing group heads into the first Sudden Death Cook-Off. Each team specifically focused on their own dish within their group and Pete and Colin selected the single best dish as their favourite, making that team safe from two eliminations.

Challenge Summary
People's Choice 1
Team		Dish	Result
NSW	Chris & Cookie	—N/a	Safe (Immunity)
VIC	Gianni & Zana	—N/a	Safe (Immunity)
NSW	Luciano & Martino	—N/a	Safe (Immunity)
White Group (Asian Theme)
VIC	Mitch & Laura	Red Chicken Curry with Red Rice and Cucumber Pickle	Judges' Choice
WA	Anna & Jordan	Satay Beef with Homemade Egg Noodles	Safe (Through to Top 12)
VIC	Eve & Jason	Vietnamese Prawn Salad	Safe (Through to Top 12)
QLD	Mike & Tarq	Roast Pork Belly with Braised Cabbage and Chilli Jam	Safe (Through to Top 12)
SA	Rosie & Paige	Five Spice Duck and Watermelon Salad	Safe (Through to Top 12)
Black Group (Mediterranean Theme)
QLD	Alex & Gareth	Ricotta and Goats’ Cheese Filo Cups with Tomato Salsa and Grilled Peach	Through to Sudden Death
SA	Carmine & Lauren	Spinach and Ricotta Rotolo	Through to Sudden Death
QLD	JP & Nelly	Chicken Shish Kebab with Harissa Pumpkin and Za’atar	Through to Sudden Death
WA	Nev & Kell	Crumbed Prawns with Mediterranean Salsa and Crispy Chorizo	Through to Sudden Death
VIC	Tasia & Gracia	Moroccan Lamb Stew with Saffron Rice	Through to Sudden Death

==== Kitchen HQ: Banquet Cook-Off ====
- Episode 26
- Airdate — 15 March
- Description — The losing five teams from the previous challenge faced off against each other in a two-part Sudden Death. The first cook-off saw all teams cooking a banquet dish to all remaining safe teams, Pete, Manu and special guest judge Curtis Stone. The two weakest teams, competed in a final cook-off, where the losing team is eliminated. The winning team advanced through to the Top 12.

Challenge Summary
Round 1
Team		Dish	Result
QLD	Alex & Gareth	Asian Omelette with Soft Shell Crab and Citrus Glaze	Safe
QLD	JP & Nelly	Beef Tostada with Guacamole and Mango Salsa	Safe
VIC	Tasia & Gracia	Crispy Pork Cakes with Apple & Pear Slaw and Sweet Chilli Sauce	Safe
SA	Carmine & Lauren	Mushroom Ragu with Crispy Polenta	Through to Round 2 (Sudden Death)
WA	Nev & Kell	Pepper Steak on Mushroom and Feta Salad	Through to Round 2 (Sudden Death)

Round 2
Team		Salvation Dish	Result
SA	Carmine & Lauren	Beef Ragu with Fettuccine	Safe
WA	Nev & Kell	Crispy Skin Barramundi with Puttanesca Sauce	Eliminated

=== Top 12 ===
==== People's Choice 2: Athlete's Challenge ====
- Episode 27
- Airdate — 16 March 2016
- Location — Sydney Olympic Park
- Description — Teams cooked a healthy dish for 200 members of the Australian Olympic team. The athletes voted for their favourite dish, with the team earning the most votes being safe from two eliminations. The two weakest teams selected by Pete and Colin are sent to the first Sudden Death Cook-Off, where one is eliminated.

Challenge Summary
People's Choice 2
Team		Dish	Result
VIC	Mitch & Laura	—N/a	Safe (Immunity)
WA	Anna & Jordan	Sweet Potato and Buckwheat Gnocchi with Kale Pesto	Athletes' Choice
QLD	Alex & Gareth	Fish Tacos with Corn Salsa and Guacamole	Safe (Through to Top 11)
SA	Carmine & Lauren	Herbed Chicken with Roast Vegetable Quinoa	Safe (Through to Top 11)
NSW	Chris & Cookie	Mexican Chicken Tortilla Cups	Safe (Through to Top 11)
VIC	Eve & Jason	Pork Fillet with Pearl Couscous and Harissa	Safe (Through to Top 11)
QLD	JP & Nelly	Chilli Beef on Sweet Potato and Power Salad	Safe (Through to Top 11)
QLD	Mike & Tarq	Spiced Prawns with Peshwari Curry and Wholemeal Roti	Safe (Through to Top 11)
SA	Rosie & Paige	Dukkah Crusted Lamb with Pistachio and Quinoa Salad	Safe (Through to Top 11)
VIC	Tasia & Gracia	Quinoa Crusted Chicken with Grain Salad and Coriander Dressing	Safe (Through to Top 11)
VIC	Gianni & Zana	Loaded Capsicums with Chicken Livers and Sweet Potato Chips	Through to Sudden Death
NSW	Luciano & Martino	Veal Involtini with Spinach and Polenta Sticks	Through to Sudden Death

==== Sudden Death Cook-Off 1 ====
- Episode 28
- Airdate — 21 March 2016
- Description — Luciano & Martino and Gianni & Zana failed to impress the judges in the Athlete's Challenge and have to compete against each other in the first Sudden Death Cook-Off, where one team is eliminated. The winning team goes through to the Top 11.

Sudden Death Cook-Off Results
Sudden Death 2
Team		Judge's scores						Total (out of 60)	Result
Team		Karen	Guy	Liz	Colin	Pete	Manu	Total (out of 60)	Result
VIC	Gianni & Zana	8	7	8	7	8	7	45	Safe
Dishes	Entree	Montenegrin Pizzette with Caramelised Onion and Goats’ Cheese							Safe
Dishes	Main	White Bean Stew with Balkan Sausage							Safe
Dishes	Dessert	Pistachio and Walnut Baklava with Honey Whipped Ricotta							Safe
NSW	Luciano & Martino	7	7	7	6	7	7	41	Eliminated
Dishes	Entree	Stuffed Calamari with Marinara Sauce and Cuttlefish Ink Risotto							Eliminated
Dishes	Main	Seafood Lasagne							Eliminated
Dishes	Dessert	Chocolate and Red Wine Pear Cake							Eliminated

=== Top 11 ===
==== People's Choice 3: Fisherman's Challenge ====
- Episode 29
- Airdate — 22 March 2016
- Location — Cockatoo Island
- Description — Teams cooked a seafood dish for 100 Fishermen and their families at the dock yards on Sydney’s Cockatoo Island. The team given the most votes by the fishermen won the Fisherman's Choice earning them safety from the next two eliminations.

Challenge summary
People's Choice 3
Team		Dish	Result
WA	Anna & Jordan	—N/a	Safe (Immunity)
SA	Carmine & Lauren	Crispy Skin Salmon with Asparagus and Lemon Butter Sauce	Fishermen's Choice
NSW	Chris & Cookie	Tempura Prawns with Wombok Salad	Safe (Through to Top 10)
VIC	Eve & Jason	Pan Fried Ocean Trout with Cauliflower Chips	Safe (Through to Top 10)
VIC	Gianni & Zana	Salt and Pepper Squid with Rocket & Radish Salad and Spicy Aioli	Safe (Through to Top 10)
QLD	Mike & Tarq	Singapore Chilli Crab with Egg Noodles and Coriander Salad	Safe (Through to Top 10)
VIC	Mitch & Laura	Snapper Remoulade with Charred Fennel and Beurre Blanc	Safe (Through to Top 10)
VIC	Tasia & Gracia	Spicy Coconut Mussels with Lemongrass Rice	Safe (Through to Top 10)
SA	Rosie & Paige	Did not participate^{1}	Safe (Through to Top 10)
QLD	Alex & Gareth	Crispy Skinned Barramundi with Asian Beans and Noodle Salad	Through to Sudden Death
QLD	JP & Nelly	Herbed Crusted Tuna with Tomato and Bocconcini Salad	Through to Sudden Death

Note:

- ^1 - Due to an accident off camera, Rosie and Paige did not participate in this challenge for safety reasons.

==== Sudden Death Cook-Off 2 ====
- Episode 30
- Airdate — 23 March 2016
- Description — Alex & Gareth and JP & Nelly did not impress the judges at the Fishermans Challenge and must go head to head in the third Sudden Death Cook-Off. The team with the lower score will be eliminated and the surviving team will proceed through to the Top 10

Sudden Death cook-off results
Sudden Death 3
Team		Judge's scores						Total (out of 60)	Result
Team		Karen	Guy	Liz	Colin	Pete	Manu	Total (out of 60)	Result
QLD	Alex & Gareth	5	5	5	4	5	5	29	Safe
Dishes	Entree	Salmon Sashimi with Avocado Puree and Rice Crackers							Safe
Dishes	Main	Eye Fillet with Butter Bean Mash and Red Wine Jus							Safe
Dishes	Dessert	Chocolate Mousse Dome with Cherry Sorbet							Safe
QLD	JP & Nelly	5	4	5	3	5	5	27	Eliminated
Dishes	Entree	Polish Borscht with Caraway Flatbread and Dill Yogurt							Eliminated
Dishes	Main	Roast Duck Maryland with Potato and Leek Mash and Red Wine Jus							Eliminated
Dishes	Dessert	White Chocolate Mascarpone Tart with Caramelised Figs and Hints of Earl Grey							Eliminated

=== Top 10 ===
==== People's Choice 4: Pop-up Cinema ====
- Episode 31
- Airdate — 28 March 2016
- Location — Carriageworks, Eveleigh
- Description — The teams are challenged to cook a family dinner box, consisting of one main element and two accompanying sides for 300 people attending a pop-up cinema event. Moviegoers will taste the boxes and vote for their favourite meals and team with the most votes will be saved from the next two eliminations.

Challenge summary
People's Choice 4
Team		Dish	Result
SA	Carmine & Lauren	—N/a	Safe (Immunity)
VIC	Tasia & Gracia	Korean Fried Chicken with Miso Corn and Cabbage Salad	Families' Choice
WA	Anna & Jordan	Mama's Homemade Pies with Peas and Mash	Safe (Through to Top 9)
NSW	Chris & Cookie	Lamb Kofta with Quinoa Pomegranate Salad and Halloumi	Safe (Through to Top 9)
VIC	Eve & Jason	Lamb Rogan Josh with Pilaf Rice and Chapati	Safe (Through to Top 9)
VIC	Gianni & Zana	Lamb Souvlaki with Lemon Potatoes and Greek Salad	Safe (Through to Top 9)
QLD	Mike & Tarq	Chili Con Carne with Blackened Corn and Iceberg Wedge Salad	Safe (Through to Top 9)
VIC	Mitch & Laura	Katsu Chicken and Pork Dumpling Bento Box	Safe (Through to Top 9)
QLD	Alex & Gareth	Cola Ribs with Onion Rings and Slaw	Through to Sudden Death
SA	Rosie & Paige	Pulled Pork Burger with Chicken Bites and Chipotle Mayo	Through to Sudden Death

==== Sudden Death Cook-Off 3 ====
- Episode 32
- Airdate — 29 March 2016
- Description — Rosie and Paige along with Alex and Gareth were the weakest teams from the Pop-up Cinema Challenge and will go head to head in the fourth Sudden Death Cook-Off. The team who receives the lower score will be eliminated and the surviving team will go through to the Top 9.

Sudden Death cook-off results
Sudden Death 4
Team		Judge's scores						Total (out of 60)	Result
Team		Karen	Guy	Liz	Colin	Pete	Manu	Total (out of 60)	Result
SA	Rosie & Paige	8	9	9	8	9	9	52	Safe
Dishes	Entree	Cauliflower Fritters with Yoghurt Sauce and Tabouli							Safe
Dishes	Main	Roasted Quail with Peas, Mint and Speck							Safe
Dishes	Dessert	Flourless Persian Cake with Rosewater Jelly							Safe
QLD	Alex & Gareth	8	9	8	7	8	9	49	Eliminated
Dishes	Entree	Five Spice Prawns with Papaya Salad and Coriander Dressing							Eliminated
Dishes	Main	Snapper with Green Chilli Coconut Broth							Eliminated
Dishes	Dessert	Doughnuts with Chilli Chocolate Ice Cream and Rhubarb							Eliminated

=== Top 9 ===
==== People's Choice 5: Rodeo Challenge ====
- Episode 33
- Airdate — 30 March 2016
- Location — Luddenham Showground
- Description — The teams were tasked to barbecue for 200 rodeo riders and their families. The rodeo riders will taste and vote for their favourite meals and team with the most votes wins Rider's Choice and is saved from the next two eliminations. The four weakest teams, chosen by Pete and Colin were sent to a following Kitchen HQ challenge.

Challenge summary
People's Choice 5
Team		Dish	Result
VIC	Tasia & Gracia	—N/a	Safe (Immunity)
VIC	Mitch & Laura	Bush Spice Kangaroo with Macadamia Salad	Riders' Choice
WA	Anna & Jordan	Spicy Sicilian Sausage with Focaccia and Tomato Relish	Safe (Through to Top 8)
VIC	Gianni & Zana	Eye Fillet Kebabs with Spicy Ajvar and Rosemary Potatoes	Safe (Through to Top 8)
SA	Rosie & Paige	Pomegranate Glazed Lamb Cutlets with Harissa Pumpkin	Safe (Through to Top 8)
SA	Carmine & Lauren	Jamaican Jerk Chicken with Rice and Pineapple Relish	Bottom 4 (Through to Kitchen HQ)
NSW	Chris & Cookie	BBQ Scotch Fillet with Smoky Potato Salad	Bottom 4 (Through to Kitchen HQ)
VIC	Eve & Jason	Bourbon Chicken with Chorizo Slaw and Jalapeño Poppers	Bottom 4 (Through to Kitchen HQ)
QLD	Mike & Tarq	Argentinian Spatchcock with Loaded Sweet Potato and Chimichurri	Bottom 4 (Through to Kitchen HQ)

==== Kitchen HQ: Alumni Challenge ====
- Episode 34
- Airdate — 3 April 2016
- Description — In a special Kitchen HQ challenge, the Bottom 4 teams from the previous challenge had their food judged by notable contestants from previous series of MKR. At the end of this cook-off, two teams are sent to Sudden Death, one sent by judges Pete and Manu, and the second sent by the alumni teams. The MKR alumni returning include:-
  - Robert & Lynzey, Ash & Camilla and winners, Will & Steve from 2015 (series 6)
  - Carly & Tresne, Helena & Vikki, and runners up, Chloe & Kelly from 2014 (series 5)
  - Angela & Melina, Sophia and winners, Dan & Steph from 2013 (series 4)
  - Runners-up, Nic & Rocco and winner, Jennifer from 2012 (series 3)

During this episode Sophia caused a fight with the rest of the alumni (especially with Angelia and Melina and Ash and Camilla where Sophia said horrible things to both of those couples) and was sent home early as a punishment for her appalling behaviour. Chloe and Kelly were also sent home early for dancing on the table and throwing food on the rest of the alumni (especially at Helena and Vikki).

Challenge summary
Alumni Challenge
Team		Dish	Result
SA	Carmine & Lauren	Roast Quail with Mushroom and Thyme Broth	Safe
NSW	Chris & Cookie	"Dessert Taco"	Safe
VIC	Eve & Jason	Crepes with Pickled Orange and Candied Walnuts	Sudden Death (Sent by judges)
QLD	Mike & Tarq	Pan Seared Duck Breast with Thai Curry Sauce and Pineapple Fried Rice	Sudden Death (Sent by alumni)

==== Sudden Death Cook-Off 4 ====
- Episode 35
- Airdate — 4 April 2016
- Description — Eve & Jason and Mike & Tarq as the weakest teams from the Alumni Challenge, battle it out in the fifth Sudden Death Cook-Off. The team who receives the lower score will be eliminated and the surviving team will be safe and join the Top 8.

Sudden Death cook-off results
Sudden Death 5
Team		Judge's scores						Total (out of 60)	Result
Team		Karen	Guy	Liz	Colin	Pete	Manu	Total (out of 60)	Result
VIC	Eve & Jason	7	7	7	6	7	7	41	Safe
Dishes	Entree	Seared Scallops with Cauliflower and Miso							Safe
Dishes	Main	Sri Lankan Beef Curry with Toor Dal							Safe
Dishes	Dessert	Butterscotch Pears with Ginger Cake and Yoghurt Sorbet							Safe
QLD	Mike & Tarq	6	7	7	6	6	7	39	Eliminated
Dishes	Entree	Thai Prawn Bisque with Prawn Toast							Eliminated
Dishes	Main	Sesame Crusted Tuna with Homemade Soba Noodles and Miso Broth							Eliminated
Dishes	Dessert	Indian Rice Pudding with Stone Fruit Compote							Eliminated

=== Top 8 ===
==== People's Choice 6: Coles Family Favourites ====
- Episode 36
- Airdate — 5 April 2016
- Location — West Ryde Coles
- Description — The teams were challenged to create a family favourite meal in a Coles supermarket. They must create a recipe, cook and serve in-store. The team receiving the most votes won Customers' Choice, safe from two eliminations and have their recipe featured in the Coles magazine. The two weakest teams will be sent to sudden death cook-off.

Challenge summary
People's Choice 6
Team		Dish	Result
VIC	Mitch & Laura	—N/a	Safe (Immunity)
NSW	Chris & Cookie	Peri-Peri Chicken with Spanish Rice	Customers' Choice
WA	Anna & Jordan	Port Braised Beef Cheek with Parsnip Purée and Pickled Salad	Safe (Through to Top 7)
SA	Carmine & Lauren	Lamb Backstrap with Roasted Garlic Celeriac Purée	Safe (Through to Top 7)
VIC	Eve & Jason	Confit Salmon with Ruby Grapefruit and Fennel Salad	Safe (Through to Top 7)
VIC	Tasia & Gracia	Satay Beef with Nasi Goreng and Achar	Safe (Through to Top 7)
VIC	Gianni & Zana	Ricotta Gnudi with Roast Pumpkin and Sautéed Mushrooms	Through to Sudden Death
SA	Rosie & Paige	Prosciutto, Camembert and Sage Chicken Breast with Pearl Couscous	Through to Sudden Death

==== Sudden Death Cook-Off 5 ====
- Episode 37
- Airdate — 6 April 2016
- Description — Rosie & Paige and Gianni & Zana failed to impress the judges in the Family Favourites Challenge and have to compete against each other in the sixth Sudden Death Cook-Off, where one team will be eliminated. The winning team goes through to the Top 7.

Sudden Death cook-off results
Sudden Death 6
Team		Judge's scores						Total (out of 60)	Result
Team		Karen	Guy	Liz	Colin	Pete	Manu	Total (out of 60)	Result
VIC	Gianni & Zana	7	8	7	7	7	8	44	Safe
Dishes	Entree	Stuffed Zucchini Flowers with Tomato & Oregano Salsa and Basil Oil							Safe
Dishes	Main	Braised Oxtail with Jerusalem Artichoke Purée and Horseradish Cream							Safe
Dishes	Dessert	Salted Caramel Tiramisu							Safe
SA	Rosie & Paige	6	7	6	6	7	7	39	Eliminated
Dishes	Entree	Ricotta, Lemon & Mint Ravioli							Eliminated
Dishes	Main	Meatball with Mozzarella and Homemade Bread							Eliminated
Dishes	Dessert	Lemon Yoghurt Cake with Cherries and Crème Fraîche Ice Cream							Eliminated

=== Top 7 ===
==== People's Choice 7: 4Fourteen Chef's Table ====
- Episode 38
- Airdate — 10 April 2016
- Location — 4Fourteen restaurant, Surry Hills
- Description — The teams headed to Colin Fassnidge’s 4Fourteen restaurant to create a main course dish. A panel of Colin's chef and management staff voted for the best dish, which will be placed on the 4Fourteen menu. That team also receives an advantage at the following challenge. The two weakest scoring dishes selected by judges will face off in the next Sudden Death elimination.

Challenge summary
People's Choice 7
Team		Dish	Result
NSW	Chris & Cookie	—N/a	Safe (Immunity)
WA	Anna & Jordan	Harissa Charred Octopus with Duck Fat Potatoes and Kale	Chefs' Choice
VIC	Gianni & Zana	Salt Baked Rainbow Trout with Sauce Vierge and Heirloom Tomatoes	Safe (Through to Top 6)
VIC	Mitch & Laura	Sous Vide Lamb with Crispy Brains and Caramelised Onion Purée	Safe (Through to Top 6)
VIC	Tasia & Gracia	Pan Seared Duck Breast with Turnips, Apple and Miso	Safe (Through to Top 6)
SA	Carmine & Lauren	Balsamic Glazed Pork Ribs with Parsnip Purée and Red Cabbage Pickle	Through to Sudden Death
VIC	Eve & Jason	Lamb Liver & Onions with Crispy Black Pudding and Sweet Potato	Through to Sudden Death

==== Sudden Death Cook-Off 6 ====
- Episode 39
- Airdate — 11 April 2016
- Description — The two weakest teams from the 4Fourteen Challenge will go head-to-head in the seventh Sudden Death Cook-Off, where one team will be eliminated. The winning team goes through to the Top 6.

Sudden Death cook-off results
Sudden Death 7
Team		Judge's scores						Total (out of 60)	Result
Team		Karen	Guy	Liz	Colin	Pete	Manu	Total (out of 60)	Result
SA	Carmine & Lauren	8	8	7	8	8	7	46	Safe
Dishes	Entree	Tortellini in Brodo							Safe
Dishes	Main	Main Beef Brisket with Mushy Peas and Roasted Bone Marrow							Safe
Dishes	Dessert	Apple Crumble Tart with Cinnamon Ice Cream							Safe
VIC	Eve & Jason	6	5	6	6	6	6	35	Eliminated
Dishes	Entree	Choux Gnocchi with Spring Vegetables and Roast Tomato Sauce							Eliminated
Dishes	Main	Lamb Cutlets with Parsnip Purée, Mushrooms and Jus							Eliminated
Dishes	Dessert	Lemon Cheesecake with Citrus Curd and Pepita Crumb							Eliminated

=== Top 6 ===
==== Kitchen HQ: Finals Decider ====
- Episode 40
- Airdate — 12 April 2016
- Description — In the Finals Decider, teams first competed in a rapid cook-off and had 45 minutes to create a dish using two ingredients that are normally an unusual combination. The six combinations of ingredients were set, with Anna and Jordan allocating each team their ingredients as their advantage from winning the previous challenge. Four teams became safe after the first cook-off, with the remaining two competing in a final Sudden Death cook-off, where the weaker team is eliminated and the winning team to join the Top 5.

Challenge summary
Surprising Fusions
Team		Dish	Result
WA	Anna & Jordan	Saffron and Vanilla Lobster with Saffron Pasta	Safe (Through to Top 5)
VIC	Gianni & Zana	Chicken Liver Pâté with Balsamic Figs	Safe (Through to Top 5)
VIC	Mitch & Laura	Spiced Lamb Rack with Apricot Purée and Tortellini	Safe (Through to Top 5)
VIC	Tasia & Gracia	Black Pudding Scotch Eggs with Rhubarb Mayonnaise	Safe (Through to Top 5)
SA	Carmine & Lauren	Chocolate Ganache with Beetroot Sauce and Macadamia Crumb	Through to Sudden Death
NSW	Chris & Cookie	Raspberry Sponge with Italian Meringue and Sweet Basil Pesto	Through to Sudden Death

Sudden Death Elimination
Team		Dish	Result
SA	Carmine & Lauren	White Chocolate & Raspberry Tart	Safe
NSW	Chris & Cookie	Mint Crusted Lamb Backstrap with Peas and Mint	Eliminated

=== Top 5 ===
==== Ultimate Instant Restaurant ====
- Episodes 41 to 45
- Airdate — 13 to 20 April 2016
- Description — For the start of the finals round, the Top 5 teams head around the country once again in an Ultimate Instant Restaurant round. All teams have to cook two dishes of each course (entree, main and dessert) for their fellow finalists and judges for scoring. Guests have a choice of choosing one of the options per course while the judges Pete and Manu each taste one of the two options. The lowest scoring team is eliminated as the remaining four teams are ranked into the semifinals.

Colour key:
– Judge's score for course option 1
– Judge's score for course option 2

Instant restaurant summary
Top 5
Team and episode details			Guest scores					Pete's scores			Manu's scores			Total (out of 100)	Rank	Result
Team and episode details			T&G	M&L	C&L	A&J	G&Z	Entrée	Main	Dessert	Entrée	Main	Dessert	Total (out of 100)	Rank	Result
VIC	Tasia & Gracia		-	8	7	10	8	9	10	10	10	8	5	85	1st	Through to Semi Final
Ep 41	13 April 2016		Mortar and Pestle													Through to Semi Final
Dishes	Entrées	1	Crystal Prawn and Ginger Dumpling													Through to Semi Final
Dishes	Entrées	2	Spicy Soft Shell Crab with Pickled Vegetables													Through to Semi Final
Dishes	Mains	1	Beef Rendang with Coconut Rice													Through to Semi Final
Dishes	Mains	2	Indonesian Grilled Chicken with Sambal and Tempeh													Through to Semi Final
Dishes	Desserts	1	Mango Mousse with Sesame Nougatine													Through to Semi Final
Dishes	Desserts	2	Sesame Chocolate Ball with Pandan Ice-cream													Through to Semi Final
VIC	Mitch & Laura		6	-	4	6	3	9	7	5	9	6	5	60	5th	Eliminated
Ep 42	17 April 2016		The Pines													Eliminated
Dishes	Entrées	1	Goat Cheese Fondant with Port Figs													Eliminated
Dishes	Entrées	2	Caramelized Onion Broth and Truffle French Toast													Eliminated
Dishes	Mains	1	Beetroot Risotto with Pan Roasted Pheasant													Eliminated
Dishes	Mains	2	Lamb Sweetbreads with Charred Cauliflower and Hazelnuts													Eliminated
Dishes	Desserts	1	Poached Meringue in Orange Scented Custard with Pistachio Praline													Eliminated
Dishes	Desserts	2	Porcini and Caramel Tart with Coffee Ice Cream													Eliminated
SA	Carmine & Lauren		8	5	-	7	7	10	9	10	7	7	7	77	2nd	Through to Semi Final
Ep 43	18 April 2016		Number 32													Through to Semi Final
Dishes	Entrées	1	Vitello Tonnato													Through to Semi Final
Dishes	Entrées	2	Duck Breast with Figs and Vincotta													Through to Semi Final
Dishes	Mains	1	Beef Cheek Ravioli													Through to Semi Final
Dishes	Mains	2	Lamb Rack with Crispy Polenta and Pea Purée													Through to Semi Final
Dishes	Desserts	1	Tartufo													Through to Semi Final
Dishes	Desserts	2	Citrus Sfogliatelle													Through to Semi Final
WA	Anna & Jordan		8	6	6	-	8	8	9	4	7	9	7	72	3rd	Through to Semi Final
Ep 44	19 April 2016		Mama Knows Best													Through to Semi Final
Dishes	Entrées	1	Gnocchi with Mushroom and Truffle													Through to Semi Final
Dishes	Entrées	2	Squid with Almond Tarator and Citrus Salsa													Through to Semi Final
Dishes	Mains	1	Black and White Crab Ravioli with Crab Bisque													Through to Semi Final
Dishes	Mains	2	Suckling Pig with Celeriac and Apple													Through to Semi Final
Dishes	Desserts	1	Rhubarb and Ginger Bombe Alaska													Through to Semi Final
Dishes	Desserts	2	Vanilla Panna Cotta with Espresso Jelly and Crostoli													Through to Semi Final
VIC	Gianni & Zana		28^{2}				-	8	5	9	8	10	3	71	4th	Through to Semi Final
Ep 45	20 April 2016		Monte Nero													Through to Semi Final
Dishes	Entrées	1	Adriatic Seafood Stew													Through to Semi Final
Dishes	Entrées	2	Sardines with Capers, Olives and Bread													Through to Semi Final
Dishes	Mains	1	Burek Cigars with Figs and Goat’s Cheese													Through to Semi Final
Dishes	Mains	2	Spiced Lamb Loin with Chestnut Puree and Mushroom Tart													Through to Semi Final
Dishes	Desserts	1	Nondaja’s Tespixhe with Citrus Salad													Through to Semi Final
Dishes	Desserts	2	'Black Mountain' Chocolate Molten Lava Cake													Through to Semi Final

Note

- ^2 – Individual guest scores were not revealed.

=== Semi-finals ===
==== Semi-final 1 ====
- Episode 46
- Airdate — 21 April 2016
- Description — Gianni & Zana take on Tasia & Gracia in the first Semi-Final Cook-Off. The lower scoring team is eliminated and the winner proceeds through to the Grand Final.

Semi-final cook-off results
Team		Judge's scores						Total (out of 60)	Result
Team		Karen	Guy	Liz	Colin	Pete	Manu	Total (out of 60)	Result
VIC	Tasia & Gracia	9	9	9	9	10	9	55	Through to Grand Final
Dishes	Entree	Lobster Tail with Yellow Curry and Taro Chips							Through to Grand Final
Dishes	Main	Crispy Fried Barramundi with Apple, Coriander and Tamarind Dressing							Through to Grand Final
Dishes	Dessert	Coconut Panna Cotta with Passionfruit Curd and Lychee Sorbet							Through to Grand Final
VIC	Gianni & Zana	8	7	7	7	7	7	43	Eliminated
Dishes	Entree	Beetroot and Goat's Cheese Ravioli with Sage Butter							Eliminated
Dishes	Main	Beef Goulash with Heirloom Carrots and Pickles							Eliminated
Dishes	Dessert	Krempita with Vanilla Poached Figs							Eliminated

==== Semi-final 2 ====
- Episode 47
- Airdate — 25 April 2016
- Description — Anna & Jordan take on Carmine & Lauren in the second Semi-Final Cook-Off. The lower scoring team is eliminated and the winner proceeds through to the Grand Final.

Semi-final cook-off results
Team		Judge's scores						Total (out of 60)	Result
Team		Karen	Guy	Liz	Colin	Pete	Manu	Total (out of 60)	Result
SA	Carmine & Lauren	7	8	8	7	8	8	46	Through to Grand Final
Dishes	Entree	Seared Scallops with Pea Cream and Speck							Through to Grand Final
Dishes	Main	Sous Vide Chicken with Smoked Potato Puree and Brussels Sprouts							Through to Grand Final
Dishes	Dessert	Grilled Peaches with Yoghurt Mousse and Peach Sorbet							Through to Grand Final
WA	Anna & Jordan	6	7	5	6	6	6	36	Eliminated
Dishes	Entree	Lightly Poached Oysters with Fennel and Apple							Eliminated
Dishes	Main	Chilli Angel Hair Pasta with Crab and Pippies							Eliminated
Dishes	Dessert	Cannoli with Orange and Mascarpone Ice Cream							Eliminated

=== Grand Final ===
- Episode 48
- Airdate — 26 April 2016
- Description — In the final cook-off for the series, the top 2 teams face-off in the ultimate Grand Final. Teams each cook a five course menu, with 20 plates of each course, totalling 100 plates per team, served to eliminated teams, friends and family. Guest judges returned for the final verdict of awarding the $250,000 prize to the winners. Teams also wear chef attire and have their Instant Restaurant represented.

Grand Final results
Team		Judge's scores						Total (out of 60)	Result
Team		Karen	Guy	Liz	Colin	Pete	Manu	Total (out of 60)	Result
VIC	Tasia & Gracia	9	9	10	9	10	10	57	Winners
Dishes		Mortar and Pestle							Winners
1st course		Seared Scallops on Betel Leaves							Winners
2nd course		Chicken Ribs with Chilli and Sweet Soy							Winners
3rd course		Grilled King Prawns with Balado and Quail Egg							Winners
4th course		Crispy Skin Duck with Green Chilli Sambal							Winners
5th course		Pandan Pudding with Coconut and Kaffir Lime Ice Cream							Winners
SA	Carmine & Lauren	8	8	9	8	9	9	51	Runners-up
Dishes		Number 32							Runners-up
1st course		Beef Carpaccio with Porcini Cream							Runners-up
2nd course		Milk Braised Pork Belly with Scallop and Apple							Runners-up
3rd course		Saffron Linguine with Butter Poached Bug Tail							Runners-up
4th course		Beef Sirloin with Madeira Jus and Mushrooms							Runners-up
5th course		Chocolate, Cherry and Coconut							Runners-up

== Ratings ==
Colour key:
– Highest Rating
– Lowest Rating
– Elimination Episode
– Finals Week

Wk.	Episode		Air date	Viewers^{[a]} (millions)	Nightly rank^{[a]}	Source
1	1	Instant Restaurant 1–1: Monique & Sarah	Monday, 1 February	1.576	#1	
1	2	Instant Restaurant 1–2: Mitch & Laura	Tuesday, 2 February	1.533	#1	
1	3	Instant Restaurant 1–3: Cheryl & Matt	Wednesday, 3 February	1.574	#1	
2	4	Instant Restaurant 1–4: Rosie & Paige	Sunday, 7 February	1.399	#2	
2	5	Instant Restaurant 1–5: Anna & Jordan	Monday, 8 February	1.675	#1	
2	6	Instant Restaurant 1–6: Gianni & Zana	Tuesday, 9 February	1.882	#1	
2	7	Instant Restaurant 2–1: Alex & Gareth	Wednesday, 10 February	1.544	#1	
3	8	Instant Restaurant 2–2: Luciano & Martino	Sunday, 14 February	1.676	#1	
3	9	Instant Restaurant 2–3: Tasia & Gracia	Monday, 15 February	1.687	#1	
3	10	Instant Restaurant 2–4: JP & Nelly	Tuesday, 16 February	1.550	#1	
3	11	Instant Restaurant 2–5: Nev & Kell	Wednesday, 17 February	1.689	#1	
4	12	Instant Restaurant 2–6: Jessica & Marcos	Sunday, 21 February	1.938	#1	
4	13	Instant Restaurant 3–1: Eve & Jason	Monday, 22 February	1.570	#1	
4	14	Instant Restaurant 3–2: Carmine & Lauren	Tuesday, 23 February	1.447	#1	
4	15	Instant Restaurant 3–3: Mike & Tarq	Wednesday, 24 February	1.437	#1	
5	16	Instant Restaurant 3–4: Hazel & Lisa	Sunday, 28 February	1.425	#1	
5	17	Instant Restaurant 3–5: Chris & Cookie	Monday, 29 February	1.473	#1	
5	18	Instant Restaurant 3–6: Tim & Dee	Tuesday, 1 March	1.496	#1	
5	19	Instant Restaurant 4–1: Nev & Kell	Wednesday, 2 March	1.372	#1	
6	20	Instant Restaurant 4–2: Monique & Sarah	Sunday, 6 March	1.325	#1	
6	21	Instant Restaurant 4–3: Hazel & Lisa	Monday, 7 March	1.450	#1	
6	22	Instant Restaurant 4–4: Alex & Gareth	Tuesday, 8 March	1.513	#1	
6	23	Instant Restaurant 4–5: Rosie & Paige	Wednesday, 9 March	1.494	#1	
7	24	Instant Restaurant 4–6: Carmine & Lauren	Sunday, 13 March	1.449	#1	
7	25	Top 13: People's Choice - RSL Buffet Challenge	Monday, 14 March	1.418	#1	
7	26	Top 13: Kitchen HQ - Banquet Cook-Off	Tuesday, 15 March	1.376	#1	
7	27	Top 12: People's Choice - Athlete's Challenge	Wednesday, 16 March	1.307	#1	
8	28	Sudden Death Cook-Off 1	Monday, 21 March	1.462	#1	
8	29	Top 11: People's Choice - Fisherman's Challenge	Tuesday, 22 March	1.410	#1	
8	30	Sudden Death Cook-Off 2	Wednesday, 23 March	1.250	#1	
9	31	Top 10: People's Choice - Pop-Up Cinema Challenge	Monday, 28 March	1.327	#1	
9	32	Sudden Death Cook-Off 3	Tuesday, 29 March	1.373	#1	
9	33	Top 9: People's Choice - Rodeo Challenge	Wednesday, 30 March	1.277	#1	
10	34	Top 9: Kitchen HQ - Alumni Challenge	Sunday, 3 April	1.234	#1	
10	35	Sudden Death Cook-Off 4	Monday, 4 April	1.273	#1	
10	36	Top 8: People's Choice - Coles Family Favourites Challenge	Tuesday, 5 April	1.244	#1	
10	37	Sudden Death Cook-Off 5	Wednesday, 6 April	1.301	#1	
11	38	Top 7: People's Choice - 4Fourteen Chef's Table Challenge	Sunday, 10 April	1.315	#2	
11	39	Sudden Death Cook-Off 6	Monday, 11 April	1.356	#1	
11	40	Top 6: Kitchen HQ - Finals Decider Challenge	Tuesday, 12 April	1.439	#1	
11	41	Ultimate Instant Restaurant 1: Tasia & Gracia	Wednesday, 13 April	1.349	#1	
12	42	Ultimate Instant Restaurant 2: Mitch & Laura	Sunday, 17 April	1.266	#2	
12	43	Ultimate Instant Restaurant 3: Carmine & Lauren	Monday, 18 April	1.449	#1	
12	44	Ultimate Instant Restaurant 4: Anna & Jordan	Tuesday, 19 April	1.462	#1	
12	45	Ultimate Instant Restaurant 5: Gianni & Zana	Wednesday, 20 April	1.566	#1	
12	46	Semi-Final 1	Thursday, 21 April	1.360	#1	
13	47	Semi-Final 2	Monday, 25 April	1.633	#1	
13	48	Grand Final	Tuesday, 26 April	1.820	#2	
13	48	Grand Final - Winner Announced	Tuesday, 26 April	1.969	#1	

^{a} Ratings data used is from OzTAM and represents the live and same day average viewership from the 5 largest Australian metropolitan centres (Sydney, Melbourne, Brisbane, Perth and Adelaide).
