= Maude (restaurant) =

Restaurant in Beverly Hills, California, U.S.

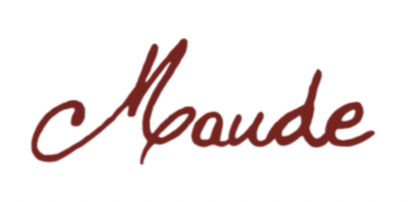
- Interactive map of Maude

Restaurant information
- Head chef: Curtis Stone
- Rating: (Michelin Guide)
- Location: 212 South Beverly Drive, Beverly Hills, California, 90212, United States
- Coordinates: 34°3′52.5″N 118°23′56″W
- Website: mauderestaurant.com

Maude was a Michelin-starred restaurant by Curtis Stone, serving California cuisine in Beverly Hills, California, United States.

Maude closed in September 2024. Chef/owner Curtis Stone said he plans to close the restaurant so he can focus on his other restaurant, Gwen, and his pie shops. The location of Maude has since been repurposed into The Pie Room, an upscale bakery also owned by Stone.

== See also ==
- Gwen
- List of defunct restaurants of the United States
- List of Michelin-starred restaurants in California
