= Silvana Franco =

British TV personality and chef

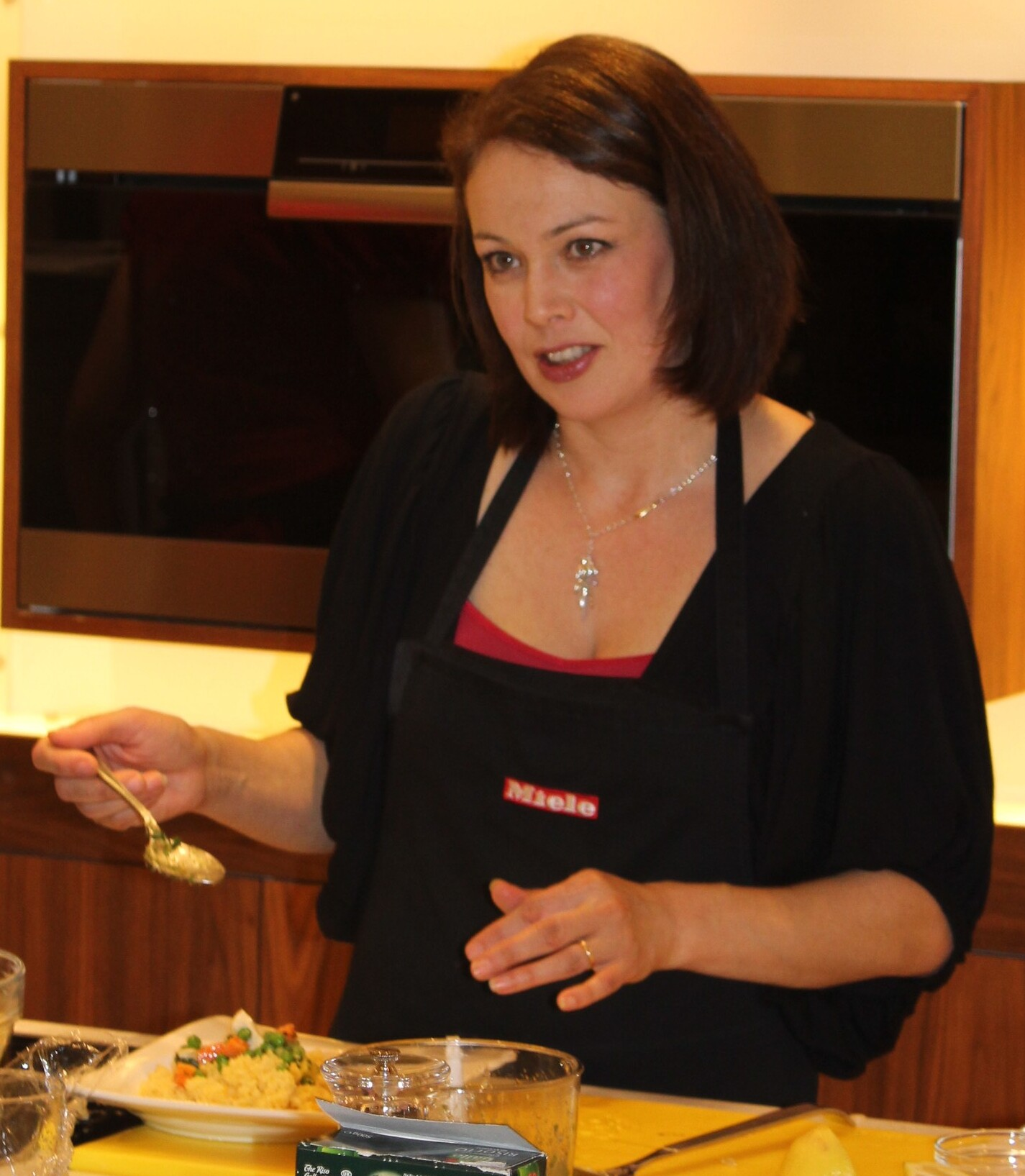
Franco at a steam cooking demonstration in 2010

Silvana Franco is a British TV personality and chef.

== Early life ==
Of Italian origin, Franco was raised in Derby. Following chef's training at High Peak College in Buxton, she studied a degree in Home Economics.

== Career ==
A college work placement with the BBC's Vegetarian Good Food magazine led to a position as a senior writer for Good Food, following which she worked as Food Editor for Marks and Spencer magazine. Her first work in television was with Ainsley Harriott as a food stylist, but she was subsequently promoted to presenter. She starred in the 2002 BBC series The Best. Franco is the author of several cookbooks, including 'Family Food' (2006) and 'The Really Useful Ultimate Student Cookbook' (2007).

Silvana writes for many UK publications including The Telegraph, BBC Good Food and Waitrose Weekend.

== Personal life ==
She is married to Rob Fitzpatrick and has a daughter, Cassia, and a son, Fabio.
