= Take Home Chef =

American reality television show

- Starring: Curtis Stone
- Country of origin: United States

Production
- Running time: 30 minutes (including commercials)
- Production company: Mike Mathis Productions

Original release
- Network: The Learning Channel
- Release: May 15, 2006 – March 7, 2008

Take Home Chef is a half-hour reality cooking show starring Curtis Stone. It originally aired on TLC.

== Format ==
In each episode, Stone introduces himself to a stranger in a grocery store, typically a woman in her 20s or 30s, and asks if she is cooking a meal for someone that night. When the person responds affirmatively, Stone offers his services to help cook dinner. They drive to the participant's house, cook the meal, and then surprise the participant's partner or guest upon his or her arrival.

Recipes that are used in each episode are posted on the show's official website.

== Notable guests ==
Voice actress Tara Strong appeared on the show in October 2006 with her husband and their two sons. Comedian Randy Sklar was surprised with Beef Wellington by his wife and Stone on an episode that aired May 15, 2007.

Canadian-Australian actress Kimberley Joseph appeared in the episode "Kimberly" (sic) that first aired June 15, 2007. Seemingly chosen at random in a grocery store, she and Curtis then recognized each other from TV shows the other had been on back home. The pair surprised three of her friends with a Spanish-themed menu, featuring tapas and a manchego cheese dessert.

== See also ==
- Surprise Chef, a similar Australian series
