= The Best (TV series) =

British television series

The Best is a British programme which aired for ten episodes between April and July 2002 on BBC Two. The series starred British cooks Silvana Franco and Paul Merrett and Australian Ben O'Donoghue, who participated in a friendly competition to create the best dish for each of two given categories per half-hour episode. Judging was performed by a rotating panel of three judges, who were not told who created which dish.

The series aired on BBC Two every Tuesday night at 8:30pm between 23 April and 16 July 2002 (except 25 June and 2 July due to a knock-on effect of Wimbledon tennis coverage). It was later repeated on the same channel between January and March 2005, and several times on the now-defunct UKTV Food between 2003 and 2009. The sixty recipes seen in the series were collected in a 2003 book, also titled The Best. (ISBN 978-0563488538)
