= Ben O'Donoghue =

Australian chef

- Born: Benjamin O'Donoghue; 22 May 1970 (age 56); England
- Spouse: De’arne Wicks
- Children: 3
- Culinary career
- Previous restaurants
- Jo Jo's; Jessica's; Goodfella's; Tribeca; The River Café; Monte's Club; Atlantic Bar & Grill
- Television shows
- The Best (UK TV series)(2002); Surfing the Menu; Saturday Kitchen; The Best in Australia
- Website: http://www.benodonoghue.com

Benjamin O'Donoghue (born 22 May 1970) is an Australian chef.

== Early years ==
O'Donoghue was five years old when his family moved from England to Port Hedland, Western Australia. At the age of ten, his family moved to Perth. On finishing school O'Donoghue was employed at a restaurant at Rottnest Island for the summer as a kitchen hand. As a result, he applied for and obtained an apprenticeship in a seafood restaurant in Nedlands called Jo Jo's. In his final year of high school at La Salle College in Midland he was head boy.

== Career ==
After qualifying as a chef O'Donoghue was promoted to sous chef at Jessica's Seafood Restaurant in Perth. This was followed by stints as Chef de Partie at Goodfella's restaurant in Newtown, Sydney and at the Tribeca restaurant in Double Bay, where he was subsequently promoted to sous chef. In 1993, the restaurant was awarded the "Best New Restaurant Award" by the Sydney Morning Herald Good Food Guide.

In 1996 O'Donoghue travelled to the United Kingdom where he worked at The River Café before moving to become Head Chef at the Monte's Club in Knightsbridge with Jamie Oliver. He then worked as the Head Chef at the Atlantic Bar & Grill and also helping Oliver Peyton win the contract to open the National Dining Room at the National Gallery with his creative and seasonal menus. O'Donoghue has also worked with Oliver as a consultant food stylist as well as assisting him with various outside catering functions, including cooking for Tony Blair and the Italian Prime Minister.

=== Television ===
O'Donoghue appeared in two episodes of Jamie Oliver's The Naked Chef, before making the first show of his own in Morocco, for American Television. That was followed, in April 2002, by an invitation to co-present a BBC Two ten-part prime-time series, The Best, with an accompanying BBC book of the same name.

When he returned to Australia, he went straight into filming an eight-part food and travel series, Surfing the Menu, for the ABC, along with Curtis Stone, which aired in 2003, and included an accompanying ABC book. The show ran for a further three seasons.

From 2007, O'Donoghue appeared on LifeStyle Food in The Best in Australia with fellow chef, Darren Simpson, and cook Anna Gare, as well as Drive thru Australia, Tom & Ben's Singapore and Aussie BBQ Hero.

In June 2009, O'Donoghue took part in a "Celebrity Chef Challenge" on Masterchef Australia, in which he was beaten by contestant Lucas Parsons, cooking a seared kangaroo loin with creamed corn.

=== Publishing ===
O'Donoghue has released four cookbooks with Hardie Grant Books, Outdoor: Grill Your Way Round the World; Ben's Barbeque; At Home With Ben – a snapshot of his stellar cooking career and Ben's Barbecue Bible – a culmination of all things barbecuing. His fourth book, Ben's Meat Bible, was released in 2015. He has also been a regular contributor to major food magazines including writing for Delicious for 10 years.

=== Restaurants ===
O'Donoghue was the owner of three Brisbane restaurants and retail fronts – Billykart Kitchen, Billykart West End and Billykart Bar. He sold Billykart Kitchen in Annerley in July 2021. His company behind Billykart West End had administrators appointed in April 2023.

== Personal life ==
O'Donoghue currently lives in Australia with his wife, Dee, and their three children, Ruby, Herb and Cash.

== Bibliography ==
- Outdoor : grill your way 'round the world – Hardie Grant Books (Prahran, Victoria) (2008) ISBN 978-1-74066-559-9
- Surfing the menu : two chefs, one journey: a fresh-food adventure – ABC Books (Sydney, Australia) (2004) ISBN 0-7333-1301-9
- Surfing the menu again: with more than eighty exciting fresh-food recipes – ABC Books (Sydney, Australia) (2005) ISBN 0-7333-1496-1
