= Surfing the Menu =

- Genre: Cooking
- Presented by: Curtis Stone; Ben O'Donoghue; Mark Gardner
- Country of origin: Australia
- Original language: English
- No. of seasons: 4
- No. of episodes: 32

Original release
- Network: ABC
- Release: 2003 – 2006

Related
- Surfing the Menu: The Next Generation

Surfing the Menu is an Australian television cooking and lifestyle series on the ABC which aired between 2003 and 2006. The series follows features two chefs who follow their passions as they travel around Australia and New Zealand.

The first three seasons were presented by Curtis Stone and Ben O'Donoghue. The fourth season also featured episodes presented by O'Donoghue and Mark Gardner. In 2016 a new series Surfing the Menu: The Next Generation debuted.

== Episodes ==
=== Season 1 (2003) ===
| No. overall | No. in season | Title | Original release date |
|---|---|---|---|
| 1 | 1 | "Abrolhos Islands" | TBA |
| 2 | 2 | "Broome" | TBA |
| 3 | 3 | "Margaret River" | TBA |
| 4 | 4 | "Tasmania" | TBA |
| 5 | 5 | "New Norcia" | TBA |
| 6 | 6 | "Hunter Valley" | TBA |
| 7 | 7 | "Bellarine Peninsula" | TBA |
| 8 | 8 | "Byron Bay" | TBA |

=== Season 2 (2004) ===
| No. overall | No. in season | Title | Original release date |
|---|---|---|---|
| 9 | 1 | "Cairns" | TBA |
| 10 | 2 | "Ningaloo Coast" | TBA |
| 11 | 3 | "Kakadu" | TBA |
| 12 | 4 | "Freo & Rotto" | TBA |
| 13 | 5 | "Mornington Peninsula" | TBA |
| 14 | 6 | "Albany" | TBA |
| 15 | 7 | "Eyre Peninsula" | TBA |
| 16 | 8 | "Sydney" | TBA |

=== Season 3 (2005) ===
| No. overall | No. in season | Title | Original release date |
|---|---|---|---|
| 17 | 1 | "Tiwi Islands" | TBA |
| 18 | 2 | "The Kimberlies" | TBA |
| 19 | 3 | "Noosa" | TBA |
| 20 | 4 | "Sapphire Coast" | TBA |
| 21 | 5 | "Yarra Valley" | TBA |
| 22 | 6 | "Fleurieu Peninsula" | TBA |
| 23 | 7 | "Cockburn Sound" | TBA |
| 24 | 8 | "Esperance" | TBA |

=== Season 4 (2006) ===
| No. overall | No. in season | Title | Original release date |
|---|---|---|---|
| 25 | 1 | "Otago/Canterbury" | TBA |
| 26 | 2 | "Marlborough" | TBA |
| 27 | 3 | "Gisborne" | TBA |
| 28 | 4 | "Southern Lakes" | TBA |
| 29 | 5 | "Wairrarapa" | TBA |
| 30 | 6 | "Hawkes Bay" | TBA |
| 31 | 7 | "Rotorua" | TBA |
| 32 | 8 | "Northland" | TBA |

== See also ==
- List of Australian television series
