= Gwen (restaurant) =

Restaurant in Los Angeles, California, U.S.

- Interactive map of Gwen

Restaurant information
- Established: 2016; 10 years ago
- Owners: Curtis Stone and Luke Stone
- Head chef: Curtis Stone
- Food type: Steakhouse, American
- Location: 6600 W Sunset Blvd., Hollywood, California, 90028, United States
- Coordinates: 34°5′52″N 118°20′0″W
- Seating capacity: 83
- Reservations: Recommended
- Website: www.gwenla.com

Gwen is a restaurant and butcher shop in Hollywood, California.

The butcher shop is a European-style, chef-driven butcher shop offering hormone-free products.

The restaurant offers a 5-course tasting menu along with à la carte options served in an Art Deco-style dining room.

== See also ==
- List of Michelin-starred restaurants in California
