= Curtis Stone =

Australian chef, author, and television personality (born 1975)

Curtis Stone OAM
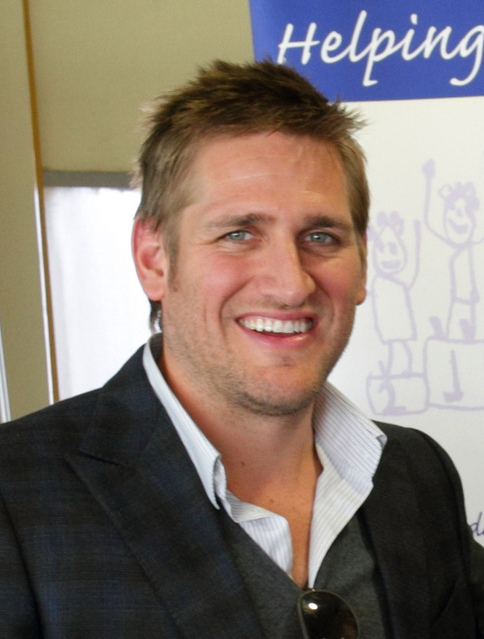
- Stone in 2012
- Born: Curtis Travis Stone; 4 November 1975 (age 51); Melbourne, Victoria, Australia
- Education: Box Hill TAFE
- Years active: 1993–present
- Spouse: Lindsay Price (m. 2013)
- Children: 2
- Culinary career
- Current restaurant
- Gwen
- Previous restaurant
- Maude
- Television shows
- Crime Scene Kitchen; America's Next Great Restaurant; Master Chef Season 11; Iron Chef America; Top Chef Masters; Around the World in 80 Plates; Take Home Chef; Top Chef Junior; Field Trip with Curtis Stone
- Website: curtisstone.com

Curtis Travis Stone OAM (born 4 November 1975) is an Australian celebrity chef, author, and television personality. Stone has been the fresh food and recipes ambassador for Coles Supermarkets in Australia since 2010.

== Early life ==
Stone was born in Melbourne and grew up in the suburb of East Keilor. Stone began cooking with his paternal grandmother, Maude, at the age of four. His father, Bryan Stone, is an accountant, and his mother, Lorraine, is a florist; they separated when Stone was two years old. Stone attended Penleigh and Essendon Grammar School where he took home economics class and then went on to a commercial cookery apprenticeship at a vocational school.

== Career ==
Stone studied for a Bachelor of Business at Victoria University before dropping out and deciding to pursue a career as a chef. He worked in Australian restaurants before leaving to work in London, where he debuted his cooking career at age 18 at the Savoy Hotel. Upon completing his qualifications as a chef at Box Hill TAFE, Stone began cooking under Marco Pierre White at the Café Royal and Mirabelle, and went on to become head chef at White's Quo Vadis.

=== Television ===
Stone returned briefly to Australia to make the travelling cooking show Surfing the Menu (on ABC) with another chef, Ben O'Donoghue.

Stone has appeared on a number of cooking programmes in the UK, including Dinner in a Box, Good Food Live and Saturday Kitchen. He also hosted the first season of My Restaurant Rules in Australia. Beginning in May 2006, Stone hosted Take Home Chef on TLC in the United States, which went on to become an international hit for TLC.

On American television Stone appears regularly on NBC's Today. His second appearance in 2007 featured him visiting the home of host Meredith Vieira to teach her how to cook, as her children had complained that she did not know how. On 14 January 2011, Stone co-hosted the fourth hour of Today with Hoda Kotb. He has also appeared on Martha Stewart's show Martha, Access Hollywood, Lopez Tonight, The Nate Berkus Show, The Talk, The Chew, and Rachael Ray. On 7 June 2011, Curtis was a guest on Conan, where he taught Conan O'Brien how to prepare the perfect date night meal.

Stone has appeared on Food Network's Iron Chef America in the episode "Battle Skipjack Tuna", where he lost to Iron Chef Bobby Flay.

Stone has also appeared on several episodes of The Biggest Loser.

Stone was a candidate on The Celebrity Apprentice 3, which premiered in March 2010 and was the third installment to the celebrity version of The Apprentice. The show premiered on 14 March 2010, and Stone was fired on 16 May 2010, placing fourth out of 14 contestants. On the same day (16 May 2010), Stone was co-host of Miss USA 2010. Stone has also made appearances on The Ellen DeGeneres Show and The Oprah Winfrey Show. Stone appeared on a segment of Oprah's Ultimate Australian Adventure, a four-day television event that aired in January 2011.

In June 2010, producers of NBC's new series America's Next Great Restaurant announced that Stone would join the judging and investment panel on alongside Bobby Flay, Steve Ells and Lorena Garcia. The first season aired in 2011 directly followed by the fourth edition of The Celebrity Apprentice, where Stone made a guest appearance on the first episode.

In 2011, Stone became host of the third season of Bravo's Top Chef Masters, replacing Kelly Choi. In January 2012, Bravo announced Stone would co-host a new culinary reality show called Around the World in 80 Plates with fellow celebrity chef Cat Cora. The series, which premiered in May 2012, follows 12 chefs competing in a culinary race across 10 countries in 44 days.

Stone also hosted and anchored the judges' table for the Top Chef franchise's spin-off edition, Top Chef Duels, in 2014.

In August 2012, Stone appeared in an episode of MasterChef Australia All-Stars. He returned to MasterChef in May 2015 for a MasterClass alongside Marco Pierre White. Stone began hosting Kitchen Inferno in 2014 and mentored Food Network's debut culinary competition, All Star Academy, in 2015. He appeared on the network again in summer 2015 for two episodes of the show Guilty Pleasures.

In 2015, Stone also made an appearance on the second season of Celebrity Family Feud.

In 2017, Stone co-hosted the FOX reality cooking series My Kitchen Rules. Stone has previously appeared in the original Australian version of the program.

In 2019, Stone's series Field Trip with Curtis Stone began on PBS.

In 2021, Stone became a judge on Crime Scene Kitchen.

In 2026, Stone participated in season 2 of Tournament of Champions: All-Star Christmas, partnered with Miski Reyes.

=== Restaurants ===
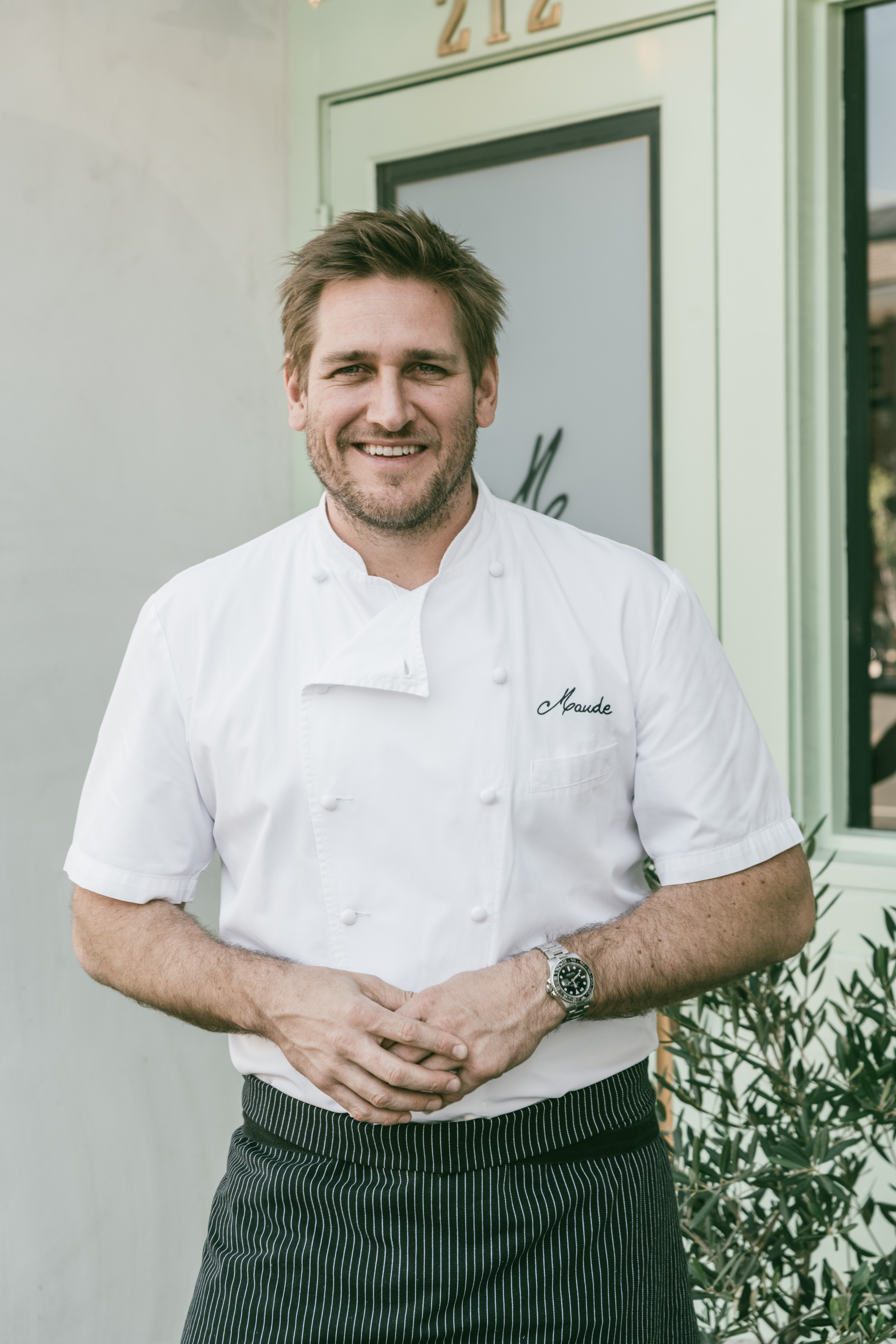
Stone at Maude in 2018

On 1 February 2014, Stone opened his first restaurant, Maude, in Beverly Hills which is named after his paternal grandmother. Maude was first awarded a Michelin star in the 2019 Michelin Guide for California and continues to hold its one-star rating as of 2023. Stone opened a second restaurant, Gwen, in Hollywood in 2016, named after his maternal grandmother. Gwen was awarded 1 Michelin star in 2022. In 2024, Curtis opened Woodend by Curtis Stone at the Maroma Hotel in Mexico.

=== Other projects ===
In 2007, Stone hosted the Great Barrier Feast Culinary Masterclass event on Hamilton Island featuring other notable Australian chefs, including Geoff Jansz, Shannon Bennett, and Justin North. In 2008, Stone developed "Kitchen Solutions by Curtis Stone," a line of kitchen utensils, accessories, and glassware. He also has written a series of cookbooks, including Surfing the Menu: Two Chefs, One Journey: A Fresh Food Adventure, Cooking With Curtis: Easy, Everyday and Adventurous Recipes for the Home Cook, and Relaxed Cooking with Curtis Stone: Recipes to Put You in My Favorite Mood. Stone's 2013 cookbook What's For Dinner? became a New York Times bestseller and was translated into Chinese in December 2014. Stone's most recent book, Good Food, Good Life, launched in March 2015 in the United States and Canada and May 2015 in Australia.

In 2010, Stone gave a cooking class and demonstration at the Singapore Sun Festival. In October 2010 it was announced that Stone had created recipes for in-flight meals for United Airlines. In 2011, he was appointed as an ambassador for Cottage by the Sea, alongside big wave surfer Jeff Rowley and Olympian Cathy Freeman. The ambassadors help the Australian charity raise funds to provide short holidays for disadvantaged children. Stone also works with Feeding America, a domestic hunger-relief charity, and Second-Bite, which redistributes nutritional surplus food to those in need.

Stone is best known in Australia for his more than a decade's long partnership with Coles Supermarket where he is the ambassador of their fresh food and recipes. In 2011, Stone described to GQ Australia his relationship with big supermarkets: "I never even thought about working for a supermarket. But there's that feeling you get when you walk down the street and someone comes up and says, 'You know what? We never used to cook fish in our house. Since we’ve tried that salmon recipe we have it once a week.' The feeling that gives you is worth a million other things". Stone and his team create recipes that feature in the monthly Coles Magazine and are very active in influencing how Australians eat, being credited with encouraging the supermarket to improve ethical sourcing. In the early years of the partnership, Stone's recipes were focused on helping Australians create meals for under $10. Winn-Dixie, an American supermarket, took the same strategy and signed Stone by launching "Cooking with Curtis for under $10" in 2015.

Stone voiced the character Todd in the 2016 DreamWorks Animation film Trolls and 2017 half-hour Christmas special Trolls Holiday.

== Personal life ==
Stone began dating American actress Lindsay Price in late 2009 after meeting on a blind date. Stone and Price got engaged in July 2012, and married on 8 June 2013 in Spain. They have two sons, Hudson and Emerson, and live in Los Angeles.

Stone is a fan of the Geelong Football Club.

== Publications ==
- Surfing the Menu, 2005
- Cooking with Curtis, 2006
- Relaxed Cooking with Curtis Stone, 2009
- What's For Dinner? 2013
- Good Food, Good Life, 2015
