= My Kitchen Rules series 16 =

Series of television show

My Kitchen Rules
- Series 16
- Starring: Manu Feildel; Colin Fassnidge

Release
- Original network: Seven Network
- Original release: 28 September 2026

Season chronology
- ← Previous; Series 15 (2025)

The sixteenth season of the Australian competitive cooking competition show My Kitchen Rules premiered on the Seven Network on 28 September 2026.

The sixteenth season auditions opened in November 2025.

== Teams ==
State	Group	Teams	Relationship	Status
SA	1/2	Angus & Simon	Mates	Competing
VIC	1	Mary & Golden	Nurses	Competing
WA	2	Sheridan & Ted	Mother and son	Competing
NSW	2	Zoe & Zac	Sassy friends	Competing
NSW	2	Harrison & Oliver	Hipster mates	Competing
VIC	1	Tiffany & Giancarlo	Loved-up couple	Eliminated 11 November (Kitchen HQ Cook Off: Round 2)
QLD	1/2	Krysten & Lucy	Mother & Daughter	Eliminated 9 November (Kitchen HQ Cook Off: Round 1)
SA	1/2	Alisha & Deanne	Classic bogans	Eliminated 2 November (Instant Restaurant: Round 2)
NSW	1	Jane & Shane	Stylish foodies	Eliminated 12 October (Instant Restaurant: Round 1)

== Elimination history ==
Teams' competition progress
Round:	Instant Restaurants		Kitchen HQ		UIR
Round:	1	2	1	2	Final 5
Teams	Progress				
Harrison & Oliver	—	2nd (82)	Kitchen HQ (38)	Safe (1st)	(81)
Sheridan & Ted	—	3rd (69)	Safe (1st)	Safe (1st)	(71)
Mary & Golden	2nd (77)	→	Safe (1st)	Safe (2nd)	
Angus & Simon	4th (70)	5th (55)	Safe (2nd)	Safe (2nd)	
Zoe & Zac	—	4th (58)	Safe (3rd)	Kitchen HQ (27)	
Tiffany & Giancarlo	1st (86)	→	Safe (2nd)	Kitchen HQ (26)	Eliminated (Episode 16)
Krysten & Lucy	3rd (72)	1st (92)	Kitchen HQ (36)	Eliminated (Episode 14)	
Alisha & Deanne	5th (68)	6th (54)	Eliminated (Episode 12)		
Jane & Shane	6th (50)	Eliminated (Episode 6)			

Cell descriptions
	Team won a challenge, cooked the best dish or received the highest score for the round.
Safe	Team was safe from elimination after passing a challenge/round.
→	Team continued to next the challenge/round.
	Team was eliminated after losing in a Cook-Off or round.
	Team lost a challenge, cooked the weakest dish, and must compete in elimination cook-off.
	Team received the highest / higher score in an elimination Cook-Off.

== Competition details ==
=== Instant Restaurants ===
During the Instant Restaurant rounds, each team hosts a three-course dinner for judges and fellow teams in their allocated group. They are scored and ranked among their group. The two highest scoring teams at the end of the round will advance directly to the Kitchen Headquarters rounds and the lowest scoring team will be eliminated, while the three remaining teams will go into a second Instant Restaurant round against three gate-crasher teams.

==== Round 1 ====
- Episodes 1 to 6
- Airdate — 28 September to 12 October
- Description — The first of the two Instant Restaurant groups are introduced into the competition in Round 1.

Instant Restaurant summary
Group 1
Team and episode details		Guest scores						Manu's scores			Colin's scores			Total (out of 110)	Rank	Result
Team and episode details		K&L	A&S	A&D	T&G	M&G	J&S	Entrée	Main	Dessert	Entrée	Main	Dessert	Total (out of 110)	Rank	Result
QLD	Krysten & Lucy	—	7	6	7	6	6	6	6	8	6	6	8	72	3rd	Through to Second Instant Restaurant
Ep 1	28 September	Puggles														Through to Second Instant Restaurant
Dishes	Entrée	Beef Tartare with Quail Egg and Truffle Flatbread														Through to Second Instant Restaurant
Dishes	Main	Paella														Through to Second Instant Restaurant
Dishes	Dessert	Mango and Coconut Sweet Rice Croissant Puff														Through to Second Instant Restaurant
SA	Angus & Simon	6	—	8	6	7	6	6	6	7	6	6	6	70	4th	Through to Second Instant Restaurant
Ep 2	29 September	Last Orders														Through to Second Instant Restaurant
Dishes	Entrée	Wagyu Sausage Roll with Caramelised Onion Chutney and Kimchi														Through to Second Instant Restaurant
Dishes	Main	Gochujang Chicken Parmi with Enoki Fries and Green Apple Slaw														Through to Second Instant Restaurant
Dishes	Dessert	Coconut Panna Cotta with Sesame Snap and Butterscotch Sauce														Through to Second Instant Restaurant
SA	Alisha & Deanne	6	7	—	5	6	5	5	7	7	6	8	6	68	5th	Through to Second Instant Restaurant
Ep 3	5 October	Hot Mess														Through to Second Instant Restaurant
Dishes	Entrée	Seared Scallops with Burnt Butter and Cauliflower Puree														Through to Second Instant Restaurant
Dishes	Main	Lamb Backstrap with Crispy Potatoes and Salsa Verde														Through to Second Instant Restaurant
Dishes	Dessert	Sticky Date Pudding with Butterscotch Sauce														Through to Second Instant Restaurant
VIC	Tiffany & Giancarlo	9	8	6	—	8	8	9	9	5	10	9	5	86	1st	Through to Kitchen Headquarters
Ep 4	6 October	Ciao Bella Ciao														Through to Kitchen Headquarters
Dishes	Entrée	Parmigiana di Melanzane (Eggplant Parmesan)														Through to Kitchen Headquarters
Dishes	Main	Agnolotti di Coniglio (Rabbit Agnolotti)														Through to Kitchen Headquarters
Dishes	Dessert	Sfincia di San Giuseppe al Limone (Creamy Donut)														Through to Kitchen Headquarters
VIC	Mary & Golden	7	7	7	7	—	7	9	7	5	10	6	5	77	2nd	Through to Kitchen Headquarters
Ep 5	7 October	Aming Kusina														Through to Kitchen Headquarters
Dishes	Entrée	Okoy Fritters with Pipino Salad														Through to Kitchen Headquarters
Dishes	Main	Cebu Lechon Belly with Pandan Rice and Atchara														Through to Kitchen Headquarters
Dishes	Dessert	Mango Float Ice Cream Sandwich														Through to Kitchen Headquarters
NSW	Jane & Shane	4	4	3	5	4	—	5	3	7	4	4	7	50	6th	Eliminated
Ep 6	12 October	Lyst Haus														Eliminated
Dishes	Entrée	Duck Chawanmushi with King Crab and Caviar														Eliminated
Dishes	Main	Master Stock Pigeon with Chilli Cucumber Samphire and Shallot Pancake														Eliminated
Dishes	Dessert	Tomato Sour														Eliminated

==== Round 2 ====
- Episodes 7 to 12
- Airdate — 13 October to 2 November
- Description — The second of the two Instant Restaurant groups are introduced into the competition in Round 2.

Instant Restaurant summary
Group 2
Team and episode details		Guest scores						Manu's scores			Colin's scores			Total (out of 110)	Rank	Result
Team and episode details		S&T	K&L	H&O	A&D	A&S	Z&Z	Entrée	Main	Dessert	Entrée	Main	Dessert	Total (out of 110)	Rank	Result
WA	Sheridan & Ted	—	6	6	4	5	7	7	7	7	6	6	8	69	3rd	Through to Kitchen Headquarters
Ep 7	13 October	The Garden Club														Through to Kitchen Headquarters
Dishes	Entrée	Chicken Liver Parfait with Milk Bread and Red Wine Gel														Through to Kitchen Headquarters
Dishes	Main	Beef Cheeks with Gruyère Mash Confit Carrots and Date & Pistachio Gremolata														Through to Kitchen Headquarters
Dishes	Dessert	Black Sesame Mochi with Dark Chocolate Ice Cream														Through to Kitchen Headquarters
QLD	Krysten & Lucy	9	—	7	8	10	9**	10	8	7	10	8	6	92	1st	Through to Kitchen Headquarters
Ep 8	19 October	Puggles														Through to Kitchen Headquarters
Dishes	Entrée	Chilli Crab with Shio Pan and Lime Butter														Through to Kitchen Headquarters
Dishes	Main	Sticky Duck with Asian Greens and Thousand-Layer Potatoes														Through to Kitchen Headquarters
Dishes	Dessert	Chocolate, Honey and Amaretto Éclair														Through to Kitchen Headquarters
NSW	Harrison & Oliver	7	7	—	9	7	7**	6	9	7	7	9	7	82	2nd	Through to Kitchen Headquarters
Ep 9	20 October	Bloody Bellissimo														Through to Kitchen Headquarters
Dishes	Entrée	Venetian Liver and Onion Ravioli														Through to Kitchen Headquarters
Dishes	Main	'Nduja Stuffed Squid with Polenta Bianca														Through to Kitchen Headquarters
Dishes	Dessert	Chocolate Pavlova with Espresso Cream and Raspberries														Through to Kitchen Headquarters
SA	Alisha & Deanne	4	5	5	—	6	4	5	6	3	5	7	4	54	6th	Eliminated
Ep 10	26 October	Hot Mess														Eliminated
Dishes	Entrée	Tuna Tartare														Eliminated
Dishes	Main	Birria Tacos														Eliminated
Dishes	Dessert	Apple Tart with Caramel Sauce and Vanilla Ice Cream														Eliminated
SA	Angus & Simon	5	6	5	3	—	5**	7	5	3	7	5	4	55	5th	Through to Kitchen Headquarters
Ep 11	27 October	Last Orders														Through to Kitchen Headquarters
Dishes	Entrée	Duck and Shiitake Dumplings with Orange and Anise Sauce														Through to Kitchen Headquarters
Dishes	Main	Lamb Cutlets with Nam Jim Jaew and Pickled Salad														Through to Kitchen Headquarters
Dishes	Dessert	Bread and Butter Pudding with Black Sesame Ice Cream														Through to Kitchen Headquarters
NSW	Zoe* & Zac	6	5	5	4	4	—	7	3	7	6	4	7	58	4th	Through to Kitchen Headquarters
Ep 12	2 November	Shuck Yeah!														Through to Kitchen Headquarters
Dishes	Entrée	Cashew Cream Zucchini Flowers with Caramelised Onions														Through to Kitchen Headquarters
Dishes	Main	Crumbed Swordfish with Fennel Salad and Lemon Rosemary Potatoes														Through to Kitchen Headquarters
Dishes	Dessert	Basil Panna Cotta with Lemon Curd and Strawberries														Through to Kitchen Headquarters

*As a pescatarian, Zoe did not try any meat dishes, so it was judged one-sided for the team.
**Due to dietary preferences, Zoe was served fish instead of duck for main at Krysten & Lucy's restaurant, the squid was without the 'Nduja at Harrison & Oliver's restaurant and the dumplings had only the shiitake mushroom filling at Angus & Simon's restaurant.

Zoe and Zac broke the last to cook curse (which stretched back to 2024), being the first team since 2024 to not be eliminated when hosting the final instant restaurant of the round. This also marks the first time since the new competition format in 2024 that all 3 gatecrasher teams advanced to Kitchen Headquarters.

=== Kitchen HQ Cook Off ===
==== Round 1 ====
- Episode 13
- Airdate — 3 November
- Description — All the teams face off for the very first time in Kitchen Headquarters, where they take on the inaugural fast and slow challenge. The fast teams have 30 minutes to create a main course, whereas the slow teams have 2 hours.

Kitchen HQ Cook Off summary
Fast
Team		Dish	Result
WA	Sheridan & Ted	Japanese Fried Chicken and Waffles	Safe
SA	Angus & Simon	Sticky Soy and Garlic Pork with Zucchini and Cucumber Salad	Safe
NSW	Zoe & Zac	Spiced Barramundi with Coconut Rice* and Mango Salsa	Safe
QLD	Krysten & Lucy	Salmon Fish Cakes with Wasabi Mayo, Papaya and Avocado Salsa	Through to Elimination Cook Off
Slow
Team		Dish	Result
VIC	Mary & Golden	Pork Adobo with Garlic Rice and Crispy Kangkong	Dish Of The Day
VIC	Tiffany & Giancarlo	Chicken Maryland with Polenta, Fennel and Orange Salad	Safe
NSW	Harrison & Oliver	Prosciutto Chicken Maryland with Stout Wedges and Radicchio	Through to Elimination Cook Off

- The coconut rice did not make the final plating.
- Episode 14
- Airdate — 9 November
- Description — Two lowest scoring teams face off in an epic banquet challenge in the third elimination of the season.

Kitchen HQ Cook Off summary
Team		Main dish	Dessert dish	Scores (out of 10)					Overall score (out of 50)	Result
Team		Main dish	Dessert dish	Safe teams average	Manu's scores		Colin's scores		Overall score (out of 50)	Result
Team		Main dish	Dessert dish	Safe teams average	Main	Dessert	Main	Dessert	Overall score (out of 50)	Result
NSW	Harrison & Oliver	Steak Feast	Fritole al Giannino with Crema al Caffè	8	7	8	7	8	38	Safe
QLD	Krysten & Lucy	Indian Banquet	Cardamom Buns with Orange Cream Pistachio Stuffed Dates and Shortbread	8	8	6	8	6	36	Eliminated

==== Round 2 ====
- Episode 15
- Airdate — 10 November
- Description — All the teams face off for the second time in Kitchen Headquarters, where they take on the multinational challenge.

Kitchen HQ Cook Off summary
French, Indian and Mexican
Team		Theme	Dish	Result
WA	Sheridan & Ted	Indian	Goan Prawn Curry with Swordfish and Vegetable Samosa	Safe
SA	Angus & Simon	French	Duck Magret with Apples and Cider Jus	Safe
VIC	Tiffany & Giancarlo	Mexican	Conchinita Pibil on Salbutes	Through to Elimination Cook Off
Chinese, Italian and Irish
Team		Theme	Dish	Result
VIC	Mary & Golden	Chinese	Yum Cha	Safe
NSW	Harrison & Oliver	Irish	Beef Rissoles with Colcannon and Guinness Gravy	Dish Of The Day
NSW	Zoe & Zac	Italian	Zucchini Ricotta Rolls with Mushroom Arancini and Italian Salad	Through to Elimination Cook Off

- Episode 16
- Airdate — 11 November
- Description — It’s the second elimination cook off in Kitchen HQ as two teams battle it out to remain in the competition.

Kitchen HQ Cook Off summary
Team		Main dish	Dessert dish	Scores (out of 10)					Overall score (out of 50)	Result
Team		Main dish	Dessert dish	Safe teams average	Manu's scores		Colin's scores		Overall score (out of 50)	Result
Team		Main dish	Dessert dish	Safe teams average	Main	Dessert	Main	Dessert	Overall score (out of 50)	Result
NSW	Zoe & Zac	Seafood Feast	Rhubarb and Strawberry Crumble with Custard and Strawberry Shards	7	7	3	6	4	27	Safe
VIC	Tiffany & Giancarlo	Italian Banquet	Strawberry Tiramisu	5	7	3	7	4	26	Eliminated

=== Ultimate Instant Restaurants ===
- Episodes 17 to 21
- Airdate — 16 November to TBA November
- Description — For the start of the finals round, the Top 5 teams head into an Ultimate Instant Restaurant round. All teams have to cook two dishes for each course (entree, main and dessert) for their fellow finalists and the judges for scoring. Guests have a choice of choosing one of the options per course while the judges Manu and Colin each taste one of the two options. The lowest scoring team is eliminated as the remaining four teams are ranked into the semifinals. Unlike the instant restaurants, guest scores were publicly revealed in front of others. The Ultimate Instant Restaurants were advertised as “Super Dinner Parties”

Colour key:
– Judge's score for course option 1

– Judge's score for course option 2

Instant restaurant summary
Top 5
Team and episode details			Guest scores					Manu's scores			Colin's scores			Total (out of 100)	Rank	Result
Team and episode details			H&O	S&T	M&G	Z&Z	A&S	Entrée	Main	Dessert	Entrée	Main	Dessert	Total (out of 100)	Rank	Result
NSW	Harrison & Oliver		—	6	9	9	9	7	9	10	9	9	4	81		Safe
Ep 17	16 November 2026		Bloody Bellissimo													Safe
Dishes	Entrées	1	Kangaroo Tartare with Taro and Wattleseed Crisps													Safe
Dishes	Entrées	2	Prawn Risotto													Safe
Dishes	Mains	1	Rabbit Cacciatore with Polenta													Safe
Dishes	Mains	2	Milk-Braised Pork Belly with Cavolo Nero and Roast Potatoes													Safe
Dishes	Desserts	1	Nonno's Mele Al Forno													Safe
Dishes	Desserts	2	Ricotta Cream Cannoli with Pistachios													Safe
WA	Sheridan & Ted		5	—	7	8	7	10	8	5	6	10	5	71		
Ep 18	17 November 2026		The Garden Club													
Dishes	Entrées	1	Beef and Guanciale Skewers with Chimichurri Mayo and Pickled Salad													
Dishes	Entrées	2	Crispy Pork Bao Buns													
Dishes	Mains	1	Taiwanese Beef Noodle Soup													
Dishes	Mains	2	Lamb Shoulder with Hummus, Toum and Flatbread													
Dishes	Desserts	1	Caramelised Brown Sugar Tart with Burnt Banana Ice Cream													
Dishes	Desserts	2	Spiced Self-Saucing Chocolate Pudding with Chilli Honey Ice Cream													
VIC	Mary & Golden				—									TBA		
Ep 19	23 November 2026		Aming Kusina													
Dishes	Entrées	1														
Dishes	Entrées	2														
Dishes	Mains	1														
Dishes	Mains	2														
Dishes	Desserts	1														
Dishes	Desserts	2														
NSW	Zoe & Zac					—								TBA		
Ep 20	24 November 2026		Shuck Yeah!													
Dishes	Entrées	1														
Dishes	Entrées	2														
Dishes	Mains	1														
Dishes	Mains	2														
Dishes	Desserts	1														
Dishes	Desserts	2														
SA	Angus & Simon						—							TBA		
Ep 21	30 November 2026		Last Orders													
Dishes	Entrées	1														
Dishes	Entrées	2														
Dishes	Mains	1														
Dishes	Mains	2														
Dishes	Desserts	1														
Dishes	Desserts	2														

== Ratings ==
Colour key:
– Highest rating
– Lowest rating
– Elimination episode
– Finals weeks

Week	Episode		Air date	Viewers (millions) (Note: Ratings data used is from OzTAM and represents the National Total audience.)	Nightly rank	Source
1	1	Instant Restaurant 1-1: Krysten and Lucy	Monday, 28 September	0.956	4	
1	2	Instant Restaurant 1-2: Angus and Simon	Tuesday, 29 September	1.018	4	
2	3	Instant Restaurant 1-3: Alisha and Deanne	Monday, 5 October	0.981	4	
2	4	Instant Restaurant 1-4: Tiffany and Giancarlo	Tuesday, 6 October	1.039	4	
2	5	Instant Restaurant 1-5: Mary and Golden	Wednesday, 7 October	1.011	3	
3	6	Instant Restaurant 1-6: Jane and Shane	Monday, 12 October	1.339	2	
3	7	Instant Restaurant 2-1: Sheridan and Ted	Tuesday, 13 October	1.090	4	
4	8	Instant Restaurant 2-2: Krysten and Lucy	Monday, 19 October	1.137	4	
4	9	Instant Restaurant 2-3: Harrison and Oliver	Tuesday, 20 October	1.084	4	
5	10	Instant Restaurant 2-4: Alisha and Deanne	Monday, 26 October	1.060	3	
5	11	Instant Restaurant 2-5: Angus and Simon	Tuesday, 27 October	1.086	3	
6	12	Instant Restaurant 2-6: Zoe & Zac	Monday, 2 November	1.209	2	
6	13	Kitchen HQ Cook Off Round 1	Tuesday, 3 November	1.066	7	
7	14	Kitchen HQ Elimination 1	Monday, 9 November	1.112	3	
7	15	Kitchen HQ Cook Off Round 2	Tuesday, 10 November	1.067	3	
7	16	Kitchen HQ Elimination 2	Wednesday, 11 November	1.009	3	
8	17	Ultimate Instant Restaurant 1: Harrison & Oliver	Monday, 16 November	1.070	3	
8	18	Ultimate Instant Restaurant 2: Sheridan & Ted	Tuesday, 17 November			
