= My Kitchen Rules series 15 =

Series of television show

My Kitchen Rules
- Series 15
- Starring: Manu Feildel; Colin Fassnidge

Release
- Original network: Seven Network
- Original release: 1 September – 16 November 2025

Season chronology
- ← Previous; Series 14 (2024) Next → Series 16 (2026)

The fifteenth season of the Australian competitive cooking competition show My Kitchen Rules premiered on the Seven Network on 1 September 2025.

The fifteenth season auditions opened in October 2024. In November 2024, the series was officially renewed at Seven's Upfronts.

New South Wales best mates Justin and Will won the competition, earning the $100,000 prize money.

== Teams ==
Hometown/state		Group	Teams	Relationship	Status
Cronulla	NSW	1	Justin & Will Mataka	Best mates	Winners 16 November (Grand Finale)
Glenelg	SA	1/2	Maria & Bailey	Boss friends	Runners-up 16 November (Grand Finale)
Logan	QLD	1/2	Lauren & Lilly	Besties	Eliminated 10 November (Semi-Final Round 2)
Perth	WA	2	Danielle & Marko	Happy couple	Eliminated 9 November (Semi-Final Round 1)
Adelaide	SA	2	Mark & Tan	Competitive mates	Eliminated 4 November (Ultimate Instant Restaurant)
Gold Coast	QLD	1/2	Michael & Rielli	Opinionated couple	Eliminated 20 October (Kitchen HQ: Round 2)
Melbourne	VIC	1	Anne & Maree	Greek mother & daughter	Eliminated 13 October (Kitchen HQ: Round 1)
Brisbane	QLD	2	Amy & Lara	Saucy divorcees	Eliminated 6 October (Instant Restaurant: Round 2)
Sydney	NSW	1	Mel & Jacinta	Feisty cousins	Eliminated 15 September (Instant Restaurant: Round 1)

== Elimination history ==
Teams' competition progress
Round:	Instant Restaurants		Kitchen HQ Cook Off		UIR	Semi Final		Grand Finale
Round:	1	2	1	2	Final 5	1	2	Grand Finale
Teams	Progress							
Justin & Will	1st (79)	→	Safe (1st)	Safe (1st)	1st (75)	Safe	—	Winners (73)
Maria & Bailey	3rd (68)	5th (62)	Safe (1st)	Safe (1st)	3rd (64)	—	Safe	Runners-up (72)
Lol & Lil	5th (64)	4th (69)	Kitchen HQ (21)	Safe (2nd)	2nd (68)	—	Lose	Eliminated (Episode 23)
Danielle & Marko	—	1st (84)	Immune	Kitchen HQ (22)	4th (62)	Lose	Eliminated (Episode 22)	
Mark & Tan	—	2nd (80)	Safe (2nd)	Safe (2nd)	5th (56)	Eliminated (Episode 21)		
Michael & Rielli	4th (65)	3rd (72)	Safe (2nd)	Kitchen HQ (21)	Eliminated (Episode 16)			
Anne & Maree	2nd (78)	→	Kitchen HQ (19)	Eliminated (Episode 14)				
Amy & Lara	—	6th (58)	Eliminated (Episode 12)					
Mel & Jacinta	6th (50)	Eliminated (Episode 6)						

Cell descriptions
	Team won a challenge, cooked the best dish or received the highest score for the round.
Safe	Team was safe from elimination after passing a challenge/round.
→	Team continued to next the challenge/round.
	Team was eliminated after losing in a Cook-Off or round.
	Team lost a challenge, cooked the weakest dish, and must compete in elimination cook-off.
	Team received the highest / higher score in an elimination Cook-Off.

== Competition details ==
=== Instant Restaurants ===
During the Instant Restaurant rounds, each team hosts a three-course dinner for judges and fellow teams in their allocated group. They are scored and ranked among their group. The two highest scoring teams at the end of the round will advance directly to the Kitchen Headquarters rounds, and the lowest scoring team will be eliminated, while the three remaining teams will go into a second instant restaurant round against three gatecrasher teams.

==== Round 1 ====
- Episodes 1 to 6
- Airdate — 1 to 15 September
- Description — The first of the two instant restaurant groups are introduced into the competition in Round 1.

Instant Restaurant summary
Group 1
Team and episode details		Guest scores						Manu's scores			Colin's scores			Total (out of 110)	Rank	Result
Team and episode details		J&W	A&M	M&R	M&B	L&L	M&J	Entrée	Main	Dessert	Entrée	Main	Dessert	Total (out of 110)	Rank	Result
NSW	Justin & Will	—	8	7	7	7	8	6	9	6	6	9	6	79	1st	Through to Kitchen Headquarters
Ep 1	1 September	Tropic Like It's Hot														Through to Kitchen Headquarters
Dishes	Entrée	’Ota ‘Ika with Taro Crisps														Through to Kitchen Headquarters
Dishes	Main	Red Curry Duck with Coconut Rice														Through to Kitchen Headquarters
Dishes	Dessert	Cape Malay Koeksisters with Spiced Syrup														Through to Kitchen Headquarters
VIC	Anne & Maree	7	—	7	6	7	7	9	7	6	10	6	6	78	2nd	Through to Kitchen Headquarters
Ep 2	2 September	Yia Yia Mary's														Through to Kitchen Headquarters
Dishes	Entrée	Chargrilled Octopus with Spanakorizo														Through to Kitchen Headquarters
Dishes	Main	Chicken and Lamb Souvlakia with Pita and Tzatziki														Through to Kitchen Headquarters
Dishes	Dessert	Yia Yia's Orange Semolina Cake with Chocolate and Candied Orange														Through to Kitchen Headquarters
QLD	Michael & Rielli	6	6	—	7	5	4	6	3	9	5	4	10	65	4th	Through to Second Instant Restaurant
Ep 3	3 September	Perfectly Paired														Through to Second Instant Restaurant
Dishes	Entrée	Beetroot and Feta Cheesecake with Onion Chutney and Beetroot Chips														Through to Second Instant Restaurant
Dishes	Main	Buttered Beef Tongue with Braised Cabbage and Potato Straws														Through to Second Instant Restaurant
Dishes	Dessert	Raspberry Gel and Chocolate Mousse Dome														Through to Second Instant Restaurant
SA	Maria & Bailey	6	6	6	—	6	5	10	4	5	9	5	6	68	3rd	Through to Second Instant Restaurant
Ep 4	8 September	Medusa														Through to Second Instant Restaurant
Dishes	Entrée	Spanakopita Ravioli with Feta Crème, Crispy Leeks and Dill Oil														Through to Second Instant Restaurant
Dishes	Main	Murray Cod with Citrus Buerre Blanc and Charred Leek														Through to Second Instant Restaurant
Dishes	Dessert	Greek Yogurt Panna Cotta with Citrus Compote Thyme and Honey Gel and Sesame Brittle														Through to Second Instant Restaurant
QLD	Lol & Lil	6	5	5	5	—	6	5	6	7	6	6	7	64	5th	Through to Second Instant Restaurant
Ep 5	9 September	Sugar, Spice & Everything Nice!														Through to Second Instant Restaurant
Dishes	Entrée	Grilled Prawn and Mango Salsa Tortilla Bites														Through to Second Instant Restaurant
Dishes	Main	Chicken and Leek Pot Pie														Through to Second Instant Restaurant
Dishes	Dessert	Lemon Meringue Pie														Through to Second Instant Restaurant
NSW	Mel & Jacinta	5	5	5	4	3	—	7	4	3	6	5	3	50	6th	Eliminated
Ep 6	15 September	Beverly Social														Eliminated
Dishes	Entrée	Bang Bang Cauliflower with Spiced Cashew Sauce and Pickled Cucumber														Eliminated
Dishes	Main	Braised Beef with Black Rice, Lime and Corn Salad and Coconut Roti														Eliminated
Dishes	Dessert	Tofu Mocha Mousse with Coffee Liqueur and Coconut Sauce														Eliminated

Mel and Jacinta's elimination was cited by fans as one of Australia's most funniest moments in reality TV in 2025.

==== Round 2 ====
- Episodes 7 to 12
- Airdate — 16 September to 6 October
- Description — The second of the two instant restaurant groups are introduced into the competition in Round 2.

Instant Restaurant summary
Group 2
Team and episode details		Guest scores						Manu's scores			Colin's scores			Total (out of 110)	Rank	Result
Team and episode details		D&M	M&B	M&T	L&L	M&R	A&L	Entrée	Main	Dessert	Entrée	Main	Dessert	Total (out of 110)	Rank	Result
WA	Danielle & Marko	—	7	7	6	6	8	8	9	9	7	8	9	84	1st	Through to Kitchen Headquarters
Ep 7	16 September	Feastival														Through to Kitchen Headquarters
Dishes	Entrée	Spicy Ahi Tuna with Crispy Rice														Through to Kitchen Headquarters
Dishes	Main	Slow Roasted Pork Belly with Ginger And Soy Noodles														Through to Kitchen Headquarters
Dishes	Dessert	Miso Brownie with Miso Caramel Sauce and Sesame Icecream														Through to Kitchen Headquarters
SA	Maria & Bailey	6	—	5	6	6	5	5	7	5	7	5	5	62	5th	Through to Kitchen Headquarters
Ep 8	23 September	Medusa														Through to Kitchen Headquarters
Dishes	Entrée	Modern Moussaka														Through to Kitchen Headquarters
Dishes	Main	Sous Vide Chicken Skewers with Celeriac Purée and Salsa Verde														Through to Kitchen Headquarters
Dishes	Dessert	Dulce De Leche Chocolate Whisky And Pear Tart with Pear and Cardamom Sorbet														Through to Kitchen Headquarters
SA	Mark & Tan	8	5	—	6	6	6	9	10	6	9	10	5	80	2nd	Through to Kitchen Headquarters
Ep 9	24 September	Charmed														Through to Kitchen Headquarters
Dishes	Entrée	Grilled Octopus with Roasted Capsicum and Thai Chimichurri														Through to Kitchen Headquarters
Dishes	Main	Chicken Khao Soi														Through to Kitchen Headquarters
Dishes	Dessert	Passionfruit Crème Brûlée														Through to Kitchen Headquarters
QLD	Lol & Lil	6	5	6	—	6	6	7	8	5	7	8	5	69	4th	Through to Kitchen Headquarters
Ep 10	29 September	Sugar, Spice & Everything Nice!														Through to Kitchen Headquarters
Dishes	Entrée	Pan Seared Scallops with Lemon Garlic Butter and Pea Purée														Through to Kitchen Headquarters
Dishes	Main	Pumpkin & Ricotta Ravioli with Crispy Sage and Browned Butter														Through to Kitchen Headquarters
Dishes	Dessert	Lamington														Through to Kitchen Headquarters
QLD	Michael & Rielli	6	6	5	5	—	4	8	7	9	7	7	8	72	3rd	Through to Kitchen Headquarters
Ep 11	30 September	Perfectly Paired														Through to Kitchen Headquarters
Dishes	Entrée	Confit Duck Tart with Caramelised Onions														Through to Kitchen Headquarters
Dishes	Main	Rack Of Lamb with Leek Purée and Crispy Smashed Potatoes														Through to Kitchen Headquarters
Dishes	Dessert	Paris-Brest with Hazelnut Praline Cream														Through to Kitchen Headquarters
QLD	Amy & Lara	6	3	7	5	5	—	9	3	5	8	2	5	58	6th	Eliminated
Ep 12	6 October	Only Pans														Eliminated
Dishes	Entrée	Ceviche Beetle Leaf with Pork Crackling and Peanut Relish														Eliminated
Dishes	Main	Eye Fillet with Lobster and Truffle Mash														Eliminated
Dishes	Dessert	White Chocolate and Passionfruit Cheesecake														Eliminated

=== Kitchen HQ Cook Off ===
==== Round 1 ====
- Episode 13
- Airdate — 7 October
- Description — All the teams face off for the very first time in Kitchen Headquarters, where they take on the pick-a-fridge challenge. After getting the highest score in the instant restaurants overall, Danielle and Marko have immunity.

Kitchen HQ Cook Off summary
Main
Team		Ingredient	Dish	Result
NSW	Justin & Will	Lamb	South African Lamb Curry with Yellow Rice, Roti and Sambal	Safe
QLD	Michael & Reilli	Offal	Tuscan-Style Chicken Liver Veloute with Rustic Toast	Safe
QLD	Lol & Lil	Chicken	Garlic Parmesan Chicken Skewers with Potato Bake	Through to Elimination Cook Off
Dessert
Team		Ingredient	Dish	Result
SA	Maria & Bailey	Bacon	White Chocolate Bacon Ganache Donut with Salted Caramel	Safe
SA	Mark & Tan	Bananas	Thai Fried Bananas with Pandan Custard	Safe
VIC	Anne & Maree	Berries	Spiced Rizogalo with Berry Compot	Through to Elimination Cook Off

- Episode 14
- Airdate — 13 October
- Description — Two OG teams face off in an epic banquet challenge in the third elimination of the season.

Kitchen HQ Cook Off summary
Team		Main dish	Dessert dish	Scores (out of 10)			Overall score (out of 30)	Result
Team		Main dish	Dessert dish	Safe teams average	Manu score	Colin score	Overall score (out of 30)	Result
QLD	Lol & Lil	Sunday Roast: Roast Chicken and Veggies with Yorkshire Pudding	Profiterole Tower	7	7	7	21	Safe
VIC	Anne & Maree	Greek Feast: Lamb Shoulder with Lemon Potatoes, Dolmades Greek salad and Tzatziki	Ekmek Kataifi	7	6	6	19	Eliminated

==== Round 2 ====
- Episode 15
- Airdate — 14 October
- Description — The top 6 teams face off in Kitchen HQ with another pick-a-fridge and two teams are sent to the elimination cook off.

Kitchen HQ Cook Off summary
Main
Team		Fridge Theme	Dish	Result
SA	Maria & Bailey	Date Night	Prawn and Lemon Risotto	Safe
SA	Mark & Tan	Plant Based	Cauliflower Steak on Roasted Capsicum Sauce with Salt and Pepper Tofu	Safe
QLD	Michael & Rielli	Family Favourites	Gnocchi with Bacon, Pea and Parmesan	Through to Elimination Cook Off
Dessert
Team		Fridge Theme	Dish	Result
NSW	Justin & Will	Plant Based	Sticky Date Pudding with Custard	Safe
QLD	Lol & Lil	Family Favourites	Sticky Date Pudding with Butterscotch Sauce and Vanilla Bean Ice Cream	Safe
WA	Danielle & Marko	Date Night	Poached Pears with Strawberry Crumble and Chocolate Ganache	Through to Elimination Cook Off

- Episode 16
- Airdate — 20 October
- Description — It’s the second elimination cook off in Kitchen HQ as two teams battle it out to remain in the competition.

Kitchen HQ Cook Off summary
Team		Main dish	Dessert dish	Scores (out of 10)			Overall score (out of 30)	Result
Team		Main dish	Dessert dish	Safe teams average	Manu score	Colin score	Overall score (out of 30)	Result
WA	Danielle & Marko	Eye Fillet with Duck Fat Potatoes, Creamed Spinach, Mushrooms, Chimmichuri and Peppercorn Sauce	Banoffee Pie	7	7	8	22	Safe
QLD	Michael & Reilli	Pulled Pork with Baby Back Ribs, Apple Slaw and Rolls	Creme Brûlée Donuts	7	7	7	21	Eliminated

=== Ultimate Instant Restaurants ===
- Episodes 17 to 21
- Airdate — 21 October to 4 November 2025
- Description — For the start of the finals round, the Top 5 teams head into an Ultimate Instant Restaurant round. All teams have to cook two dishes for each course (entree, main and dessert) for their fellow finalists and the judges for scoring. Guests have a choice of choosing one of the options per course while the judges Manu and Colin each taste one of the two options. The lowest scoring team is eliminated as the remaining four teams are ranked into the semifinals. Unlike the instant restaurants, guest scores were publicly revealed in front of others.

Colour key:
– Judge's score for course option 1

– Judge's score for course option 2

Instant restaurant summary
Top 5
Team and episode details			Guest scores					Manu's scores			Colin's scores			Total (out of 100)	Rank	Result
Team and episode details			J&W	L&L	D&M	M&B	M&T	Entrée	Main	Dessert	Entrée	Main	Dessert	Total (out of 100)	Rank	Result
NSW	Justin & Will		—	6	9	6	8	6	10	10	7	8	5	75	1st	Safe
Ep 17	21 October 2025		Tropic Like It's Hot													Safe
Dishes	Entrées	1	Cape Malay Beef Samosas with Tomato and Chilli Chutney													Safe
Dishes	Entrées	2	Kingfish Cruedo with Black Caviar													Safe
Dishes	Mains	1	Donpou Rou with Asian Greens and Rice													Safe
Dishes	Mains	2	Seafood Hotpot with Rice													Safe
Dishes	Desserts	1	New York Cheesecake													Safe
Dishes	Desserts	2	Paris Brest													Safe
QLD	Lol and Lil		7	—	7	6	6	8	2	10	10	5	7	68	2nd	Safe
Ep 18	27 October 2025		Sugar, Spice & Everything Nice!													Safe
Dishes	Entrées	1	French Onion Soup													Safe
Dishes	Entrées	2	Fried Chicken Bao Buns													Safe
Dishes	Mains	1	Rotisserie Chicken Gyro with Pickled Red Onions and Tzatziki													Safe
Dishes	Mains	2	Beef Bulgogi Egg Net													Safe
Dishes	Desserts	1	Chai Poached Pear with Salted Caramel and Vanilla Bean Ice Cream													Safe
Dishes	Desserts	2	Raspberry & Chocolate Tart with Raspberry Coulis													Safe
WA	Danielle and Marko		5*	6	—	7	7	7	7	3	6	7	7	62	4th	Safe
Ep 19	28 October 2025		Feastival													Safe
Dishes	Entrées	1	Asian Scotch Fillet Taco with Slaw													Safe
Dishes	Entrées	2	Cevapi and Ajvar on Pita													Safe
Dishes	Mains	1	Slow Roasted Lamb Shoulder with Honey Roasted Carrots and Tzatziki													Safe
Dishes	Mains	2	Tamarind and Chilli Lime Snapper with Cajun Sauce and Sweet Potato Mash													Safe
Dishes	Desserts	1	Coconut and Lime Panna Cotta with Cookie Crumble													Safe
Dishes	Desserts	2	Hong Kong Egg Tart													Safe
SA	Maria and Bailey		6	6	7	—	7	6	6	7	7	6	6	64	3rd	Safe
Ep 20	3 November 2025		Medusa													Safe
Dishes	Entrées	1	Octopus with Fava and Spicy Salsa Verde													Safe
Dishes	Entrées	2	Feta Gnocchi with Prawns, Bisque, Pepper Cream and Ouzo Gel													Safe
Dishes	Mains	1	Barramundi with Potato Scales, Mediterranean Vegetables and Lemon Velouté													Safe
Dishes	Mains	2	Scotch Fillet with Red Wine Jus and Potato Terrine													Safe
Dishes	Desserts	1	Pavlova with Earl Grey Ganache and Raspberry and Pink Peppercorn Coulis													Safe
Dishes	Desserts	2	Warm Pistachio Cookie with Pistachio Praline, Caramelised Pistachios and Vanilla Bean Ice Cream													Safe
SA	Mark and Tan		5	4	7	5	—	8	6	4	8	6	3	56	5th	Eliminated
Ep 21	4 November 2025		Charmed													Eliminated
Dishes	Entrées	1	Pork and Prawn Dumplings with Thai Red Curry Sauce													Eliminated
Dishes	Entrées	2	Tuna Tartare with Fried Seaweed Crisps													Eliminated
Dishes	Mains	1	Pan Seared Duck with Chilli and Orange Sauce, Crispy Asian Potatoes and Beetroot Puree													Eliminated
Dishes	Mains	2	Pad See Ew with Grilled Steak and Crispy Garlic and Chilli Oil													Eliminated
Dishes	Desserts	1	Boozy Bitter Orange Steamed Puddings													Eliminated
Dishes	Desserts	2	Thai Milk Tea Tart with Whipped Coconut Cream													Eliminated

=== Semi Final ===
In the Semi-finals, the teams that ranked 1st and 4th in the Ultimate Instant Restaurants will compete in the 1st Round, whilst the teams that ranked 2nd and 3rd will compete in the 2nd Round for a spot in the Grand Final.

==== Round 1 ====
- Episode 22
- Airdate — 9 November 2025
- Description — Justin & Will compete against Danielle & Marko. All four teams tasted the meals, but only the judges scored.

Semi-Final Cook-Off Results
Semi-Final 1
Team		Dishes	Result
NSW	Justin & Will	Sri Lankan Tripe Curry with Carrot Sambal and Paratha	Through to Grand Final
NSW	Justin & Will	Chocolate Soufflé with Chocolate Ice Cream and Caramel Whisky Sauce	Through to Grand Final
WA	Danielle & Marko	Miso Glazed Salmon with Soba Noodles and Smashed Cucumber Salad	Eliminated
WA	Danielle & Marko	Pandan Meringue with Lemon Curd and Raspberry Sorbet	Eliminated

==== Round 2 ====
- Episode 23
- Airdate — 10 November 2025
- Description — Lol & Lil compete against Maria & Bailey. The competing teams and Justin & Will tasted the meals, but only the judges scored.

Semi-Final Cook-Off Results
Semi-Final 2
Team		Dishes	Result
SA	Maria & Bailey	Truffle and Porcini Tagliatelle with Wild Mushroom Sauce	Through to Grand Final
SA	Maria & Bailey	Duck Egg Crème Caramel with Vanilla Tuile	Through to Grand Final
QLD	Lol & Lil	Sous Vide Lobster with Lobster Hollandaise and Pickled Fennel Salad	Eliminated
QLD	Lol & Lil	Berry Panna Cotta and Vanilla Crème Tart	Eliminated

=== Grand Finale ===
- Episode 24
- Airdate — 16 November 2025
- Description — In the Grand Final, Justin & Will face-off against Maria & Bailey. The teams had to make 100 dishes total, consisting of a four-course meal for the judges, the eliminated teams and their family and friends, which meant 25 plates per course. For the first time, Canapés were served as the first course instead of Entrées and each course was scored out of 10 by both judges instead of an overall score for the entire meal. The teams had 90 minutes before serving the Canapés, two hours to serve seafood, 90 minutes for meat and 60 minutes more for dessert.

Grand Final
Team		Manu's Scores				Colin's Scores				Total (out of 80)	Result
Team		Canapé	Seafood	Meat	Dessert	Canapé	Seafood	Meat	Dessert	Total (out of 80)	Result
NSW	Justin & Will	9	8	9	10	9	8	10	10	73	Winners
Dishes		Tropic Like It's Hot									Winners
Canapé		Smoked Ham Hock and Gruyere Croquette with Sauce Gribiche									Winners
Seafood Course		South African Pickled Kingfish with Brioche and Green Papaya Chutney									Winners
Meat Course		Red Wine and Rosemary Braised Beef Short Rib with Parsnip Purée and Beets									Winners
Dessert		Dubai Chocolate Éclair									Winners
SA	Maria & Bailey	9	7	10	10	9	7	10	10	72	Runners-up
Dishes		Medusa									Runners-up
Canapé		Olive Oil Tartlet with Taramasalata and Caviar									Runners-up
Seafood Course		Lobster and Prawn Raviolo with Lobster Butter Emulsion									Runners-up
Meat Course		Chicken Ballotine with Potato Mash and Chicken Jus Gras									Runners-up
Dessert		Red Velvet and Cream Cheese Cookie with Buttermilk and Greek Yoghurt Sorbet									Runners-up

== Ratings ==
Colour key:
– Highest rating
– Lowest rating
– Elimination episode
– Finals weeks

Week	Episode		Air date	Viewers (millions) (Note: Ratings data used is from OzTAM and represents the National Total audience.)	Nightly rank	Source
1	1	Instant Restaurant 1-1: Justin & Will	Monday, 1 September	0.817	5	
1	2	Instant Restaurant 1-2: Anne & Maree	Tuesday, 2 September	0.792	7	
1	3	Instant Restaurant 1-3: Michael & Rielli	Wednesday, 3 September	0.882	5	
2	4	Instant Restaurant 1-4: Maria & Bailey	Monday, 8 September	0.886	5	
2	5	Instant Restaurant 1-5: Lol & Lil	Tuesday, 9 September	0.883	5	
3	6	Instant Restaurant 1-6: Mel & Jacinta	Monday, 15 September	0.998	5	
3	7	Instant Restaurant 2-1: Danielle & Marko	Tuesday, 16 September	0.876	5	
4	8	Instant Restaurant 2-2: Maria & Bailey	Tuesday, 23 September	0.934	5	
4	9	Instant Restaurant 2-3: Mark & Tan	Wednesday, 24 September	0.966	5	
5	10	Instant Restaurant 2-4: Lol & Lil	Monday, 29 September	0.936	5	
5	11	Instant Restaurant 2-5: Michael & Rielli	Tuesday, 30 September	0.975	5	
6	12	Instant Restaurant 2-6: Amy & Lara	Monday, 6 October	0.993	3	
6	13	Kitchen HQ Cook Off Round 1	Tuesday, 7 October	0.947	5	
7	14	Kitchen HQ Elimination 1	Monday, 13 October	0.947	5	
7	15	Kitchen HQ Cook Off Round 2	Tuesday, 14 October	0.940	5	
8	16	Kitchen HQ Elimination 2	Monday, 20 October	1.032	5	
8	17	Ultimate Instant Restaurant 1: Justin & Will	Tuesday, 21 October	0.995	3	
9	18	Ultimate Instant Restaurant 2: Lol & Lil	Monday, 27 October	1.026	3	
9	19	Ultimate Instant Restaurant 3: Danielle & Marko	Tuesday, 28 October	1.064	3	
10	20	Ultimate Instant Restaurant 4: Maria & Bailey	Monday, 3 November	1.043	3	
10	21	Ultimate Instant Restaurant 5: Mark & Tan	Tuesday, 4 November	1.053	7	
11	22	Semi Final 1	Sunday, 9 November	1.013	3	
11	23	Semi Final 2	Monday, 10 November	1.068	3	
12	24	Grand Final	Sunday, 16 November	1.170	1	
