= My Kitchen Rules series 14 =

Series of television show

My Kitchen Rules
- Series 14
- Starring: Manu Feildel; Colin Fassnidge

Release
- Original network: Seven Network
- Original release: 9 September – 19 November 2024

Season chronology
- ← Previous; Series 13 (2023) Next → Series 15 (2025)

The fourteenth season of the Australian competitive cooking competition show My Kitchen Rules premiered on the Seven Network on 9 September 2024.

In October 2023, the series was renewed for a 14th season. In September 2024, it was announced Colin Fassnidge and Manu Feildel would return as hosts and judges, however Nigella Lawson would not be returning. At the grand final, inaugural MasterChef winner Julie Goodwin was the guest judge.

Queensland friends Simone Prest and Viviana Barile won the competition, earning the $100,000 prize money.

== Teams ==
| Hometown/State | | Group | Members | Relationship | Status |
|---|---|---|---|---|---|
| Brisbane | QLD | 1/2 | Simone & Viviana | Modern Italians | Winners 19 November (Grand Finale) |
| Sydney | NSW | 2 | Caz & Fergus James | Mother & Son | Runners-Up 19 November (Grand Finale) |
| Perth | WA | 1/2 | Mike & Pete | Fussy Friends | Eliminated 18 November (Semi-Final Round 2) |
| Toorak | VIC | 2 | Janey & Maddie | Kitchen Queens | Eliminated 17 November (Semi-Final Round 1) |
| Mornington Peninsula | VIC | 1 | Rob & Liam | Competitive Brothers | Eliminated 11 November (Ultimate Instant Restaurant) |
| Perth | WA | 1/2 | Hannah & Lawrence | Couple | Eliminated 22 October (Kitchen HQ Cook Off) |
| Sydney | NSW | 2 | Robert & Andrea | Married Germans | Eliminated 14 October (Instant Restaurant: Round 2) |
| Adelaide | SA | 1 | Ash & Cassie | Young Mums | Eliminated 24 September (Instant Restaurant: Round 1) |
| Townsville | QLD | 1 | Danny & Sonia | Siblings | Eliminated 24 September (Instant Restaurant: Round 1) |

== Elimination history ==
Teams' competition progress
| Round: | Instant Restaurants | | Kitchen HQ Cook Off | | | UIR | Semi Final | | | Grand Finale |
| Round: | 1 | 2 | 1 | 2 | 3 | Final 5 | HQ | 1 | 2 | Grand Finale |
| Teams | Progress | | | | | | | | | |
| Simone & Viviana | 2nd (74) | 1st (104) | Safe (4th) | Kitchen HQ (27) | | 1st (68) | 3rd (30) | — | Safe | Winners (27) |
| Caz & Fergus | — | 2nd (72) | Safe (1st) | Safe (2nd) | Safe (1st) | 4th (62) | 1st (32) | Safe | — | Runners-up (25) |
| Mike & Pete | 3rd (72) | 3rd (70) | Safe (2nd) | Safe (3rd) | Kitchen HQ (21) | 2nd (63) | 2nd (31) | — | Lose | Eliminated (Episode 23) |
| Janey & Maddie | — | 4th (65) | Safe (5th) | Safe (4th) | Safe (2nd) | 2nd (63) | 4th (25) | Lose | Eliminated (Episode 22) | |
| Rob & Liam | 1st (84) | → | Safe (3rd) | Won | → | 5th (57) | Eliminated (Episode 20) | | | |
| Hannah & Lawrence | 4th (68) | 5th (53) | Kitchen HQ (19) | | | Eliminated (Episode 15) | | | | |
| Robert & Andrea | — | 6th (46) | Eliminated (Episode 12) | | | | | | | |
| Ash & Cassie | 5th (60) | Eliminated (Episode 6) | | | | | | | | |
| Danny & Sonia | 6th (56) | Eliminated (Episode 6) | | | | | | | | |

Cell descriptions
| | Team won a challenge, cooked the best dish or received the highest score for the round. |
| Safe | Team was safe from elimination after passing a challenge/round. |
| → | Team continued to next the challenge/round. |
| | Team was eliminated after losing in a Cook-Off or round. |
| | Team lost a challenge, cooked the weakest dish, and must compete in elimination cook-off. |
| | Team received the highest / higher score in an elimination Cook-Off. |

== Competition details ==
=== Instant Restaurants ===
During the Instant Restaurant rounds, each team hosts a three-course dinner for judges and fellow teams in their allocated group. They are scored and ranked among their group. The highest scoring team at the end of the round will advance directly to the Kitchen Headquarters rounds, while in an MKR first, the two lowest scoring teams will be eliminated.

==== Round 1 ====
- Episodes 1 to 6
- Airdate — 9 to 24 September
- Description — The first of the two instant restaurant groups are introduced into the competition in Round 1.

Instant Restaurant Summary
Group 1
| Team and Episode Details | | Guest Scores | | | | | | Manu's Scores | | | Colin's Scores | | | Total (out of 110) | Rank | Result |
| Team and Episode Details | | R&L | A&C | S&V | D&S | H&L | M&P | Entrée | Main | Dessert | Entrée | Main | Dessert | Total (out of 110) | Rank | Result |
|---|---|---|---|---|---|---|---|---|---|---|---|---|---|---|---|---|
| VIC | Rob & Liam | — | 8 | 8 | 7 | 7 | 7 | 8 | 7 | 9 | 7 | 7 | 9 | 84 | 1st | Through to Kitchen Headquarters |
| Ep 1 | 9 September | Yakety Yak | | | | | | | | | | | | | | Through to Kitchen Headquarters |
| Dishes | Entrée | Safety Beach Cajun Mussels | | | | | | | | | | | | | | Through to Kitchen Headquarters |
| Dishes | Main | Smoked Beef Short Rib with Nduja Cauliflower Cheese & Fired Slaw | | | | | | | | | | | | | | Through to Kitchen Headquarters |
| Dishes | Dessert | Peanut Butter S'more with Bourbon Caramel Sauce | | | | | | | | | | | | | | Through to Kitchen Headquarters |
| SA | Ash & Cassie | 5 | — | 5 | 6 | 5 | 5 | 7 | 4 | 6 | 7 | 3 | 7 | 60 | 5th | Eliminated |
| Ep 2 | 10 September | Dietitians Dishing It | | | | | | | | | | | | | | Eliminated |
| Dishes | Entrée | Duck Pancakes | | | | | | | | | | | | | | Eliminated |
| Dishes | Main | Crispy Pork Belly with Green Papaya Salad | | | | | | | | | | | | | | Eliminated |
| Dishes | Dessert | Coconut & Kafir Lime Panna Cotta with Lime Syrup & Ginger Crumb | | | | | | | | | | | | | | Eliminated |
| QLD | Simone & Viviana | 6 | 6 | — | 6 | 6 | 6 | 9 | 10 | 3 | 10 | 10 | 2 | 74 | 2nd | Through to Second Instant Restaurant |
| Ep 3 | 11 September | Sotto Le Stelle (Under The Stars) | | | | | | | | | | | | | | Through to Second Instant Restaurant |
| Dishes | Entrée | Ricotta and Prawn Cannoli Salati | | | | | | | | | | | | | | Through to Second Instant Restaurant |
| Dishes | Main | Tagliatelle Ragù Di Polpo | | | | | | | | | | | | | | Through to Second Instant Restaurant |
| Dishes | Dessert | Pistachio Tortino | | | | | | | | | | | | | | Through to Second Instant Restaurant |
| QLD | Danny & Sonia | 6 | 4 | 6 | — | 5 | 5 | 7 | 2 | 5 | 7 | 3 | 6 | 56 | 6th | Eliminated |
| Ep 4 | 16 September | Broasis | | | | | | | | | | | | | | Eliminated |
| Dishes | Entrée | Townsville Mud Crab with Mango Chilli Dip | | | | | | | | | | | | | | Eliminated |
| Dishes | Main | Filet Mignon with Garlic Prawn Toppers, Beer Battered Wedges and Bacon Broccoli Salad | | | | | | | | | | | | | | Eliminated |
| Dishes | Dessert | Espresso Martini Trifle | | | | | | | | | | | | | | Eliminated |
| WA | Hannah & Lawrence | 7 | 6 | 7 | 5 | — | 6 | 5 | 9 | 5 | 5 | 8 | 5 | 68 | 4th | Through to Second Instant Restaurant |
| Ep 5 | 17 September | Missing Piece | | | | | | | | | | | | | | Through to Second Instant Restaurant |
| Dishes | Entrée | Croquettes De Fromage with Ginger Brussel Sprouts, Jamon and Jalapeño Aioli | | | | | | | | | | | | | | Through to Second Instant Restaurant |
| Dishes | Main | Lamb Rump with Crispy Onion Rings, Carrot Purée and Carrot Top Salsa | | | | | | | | | | | | | | Through to Second Instant Restaurant |
| Dishes | Dessert | Baked Apples with Brandy Caramel and Cinnamon Ice Cream | | | | | | | | | | | | | | Through to Second Instant Restaurant |
| WA | Mike & Pete | 6 | 7 | 7 | 6 | 5 | — | 4 | 6 | 10 | 5 | 6 | 10 | 72 | 3rd | Through to Second Instant Restaurant |
| Ep 6 | 24 September | Twisted Lemons | | | | | | | | | | | | | | Through to Second Instant Restaurant |
| Dishes | Entrée | Crayfish Ravioli in Marinara Sauce | | | | | | | | | | | | | | Through to Second Instant Restaurant |
| Dishes | Main | Osso Bucco with Soft Polenta and Broccolini | | | | | | | | | | | | | | Through to Second Instant Restaurant |
| Dishes | Dessert | Sicilian Cannoli with Ricotta | | | | | | | | | | | | | | Through to Second Instant Restaurant |

==== Round 2 ====
- Episodes 7 to 12
- Airdate — 25 September to 14 October
- Description — The remaining three teams from the first instant restaurant return along with three new “gatecrashers” for the second instant restaurant. The highest scoring team at the end of the round will advance directly to the Semi Final. The lowest scoring team will be eliminated.

Instant Restaurant Summary
Group 2
| Team and Episode Details | | Guest Scores | | | | | | Manu's Scores | | | Colin's Scores | | | Total (out of 110) | Rank | Result |
| Team and Episode Details | | C&F | S&V | J&M | M&P | H&L | R&A | Entrée | Main | Dessert | Entrée | Main | Dessert | Total (out of 110) | Rank | Result |
|---|---|---|---|---|---|---|---|---|---|---|---|---|---|---|---|---|
| NSW | Caz & Fergus | — | 7 | 6 | 6 | 7 | 5 | 8 | 6 | 7 | 8 | 5 | 7 | 72 | 2nd | Through to Kitchen Headquarters |
| Ep 7 | 25 September | Tunes & Spoons | | | | | | | | | | | | | | Through to Kitchen Headquarters |
| Dishes | Entrée | Twice Baked Leek & Cheese Souffle | | | | | | | | | | | | | | Through to Kitchen Headquarters |
| Dishes | Main | Pine Nut and Pistachio Toothfish with Parsley and Rocket Vichyssoise | | | | | | | | | | | | | | Through to Kitchen Headquarters |
| Dishes | Dessert | Miso Caramel Cheesecake with Shichimi Togarashi | | | | | | | | | | | | | | Through to Kitchen Headquarters |
| QLD | Simone & Viviana | 9 | — | 9 | 9 | 10 | 9 | 9 | 10 | 10 | 9 | 10 | 10 | 104 | 1st | Through to Kitchen Headquarters |
| Ep 8 | 30 September | Sotto Le Stelle (Under The Stars) | | | | | | | | | | | | | | Through to Kitchen Headquarters |
| Dishes | Entrée | Beef Tartare with Crumbed Yolk and Crostini | | | | | | | | | | | | | | Through to Kitchen Headquarters |
| Dishes | Main | Prawn and Potato Ravioli with Prawn Bisque | | | | | | | | | | | | | | Through to Kitchen Headquarters |
| Dishes | Dessert | Millefoglie | | | | | | | | | | | | | | Through to Kitchen Headquarters |
| VIC | Janey & Maddie | 5 | 7 | — | 5 | 6 | 5 | 6 | 6 | 6 | 5 | 6 | 8 | 65 | 4th | Through to Kitchen Headquarters |
| Ep 9 | 1 October | The Queen’s Kitchen | | | | | | | | | | | | | | Through to Kitchen Headquarters |
| Dishes | Entrée | Seared Scallops with Citrus Beurre Blanc and Capers | | | | | | | | | | | | | | Through to Kitchen Headquarters |
| Dishes | Main | Duck Breast with Beetroot and Cherry Sauce | | | | | | | | | | | | | | Through to Kitchen Headquarters |
| Dishes | Dessert | Liquorice Ice Cream with Macaron Shells and Raspberry Coulis | | | | | | | | | | | | | | Through to Kitchen Headquarters |
| WA | Mike & Pete | 6 | 7 | 5 | — | 8 | 7 | 8 | 6 | 5 | 8 | 6 | 4 | 70 | 3rd | Through to Kitchen Headquarters |
| Ep 10 | 7 October | Twisted Lemons | | | | | | | | | | | | | | Through to Kitchen Headquarters |
| Dishes | Entrée | Gnocchi with Burnt Butter and Sage | | | | | | | | | | | | | | Through to Kitchen Headquarters |
| Dishes | Main | Eye Fillet with Polenta Chips, Brussel Sprouts and Garlic Butter | | | | | | | | | | | | | | Through to Kitchen Headquarters |
| Dishes | Dessert | Drunken Pear with Vanilla Ice Cream | | | | | | | | | | | | | | Through to Kitchen Headquarters |
| WA | Hannah & Lawrence | 5 | 7 | 3 | 5 | — | 5 | 5 | 7 | 2 | 5 | 6 | 3 | 53 | 5th | Through to Kitchen Headquarters |
| Ep 11 | 8 October | Missing Piece | | | | | | | | | | | | | | Through to Kitchen Headquarters |
| Dishes | Entrée | Chargrilled Octopus with Roasted Capsicum & Chilli Sauce | | | | | | | | | | | | | | Through to Kitchen Headquarters |
| Dishes | Main | Crispy Pork Belly, Mashed Cauliflower, Vermouth Jus and Apple Sauce | | | | | | | | | | | | | | Through to Kitchen Headquarters |
| Dishes | Dessert | Gaufre De Bruxelles with Strawberry Lime Sauce and Dark Chocolate | | | | | | | | | | | | | | Through to Kitchen Headquarters |
| NSW | Robert & Andrea | 4 | 6 | 3 | 4 | 3 | — | 6 | 2 | 5 | 6 | 2 | 5 | 46 | 6th | Eliminated |
| Ep 12 | 14 October | Unser Bayerischer Hof (Our Bavarian Backyard) | | | | | | | | | | | | | | Eliminated |
| Dishes | Entrée | Leberknödelsuppe | | | | | | | | | | | | | | Eliminated |
| Dishes | Main | Fränkische Bratwurst with Potato Salad and Red Cabbage | | | | | | | | | | | | | | Eliminated |
| Dishes | Dessert | Black Forest Cake | | | | | | | | | | | | | | Eliminated |

=== Kitchen HQ Cook Off ===
==== Round 1 ====
- Episode 13
- Airdate — 15 October
- Description — Six teams competed in the Kitchen HQ. The challenge was over two rounds; in round one 3 teams had to create a main dish with a key ingredient, while the other 3 teams had to create a dessert with a key ingredient, and the weakest team will be sent to the elimination cook off, while the 5 remaining will compete in round 2.

Kitchen HQ Cook Off summary
Main
| Team | | Main Ingredient | Dish | Result |
|---|---|---|---|---|
| QLD | Simone & Vivana | Chicken | Chicken Roulade with Duck Fat Potatoes and Mushroom Sauce | Through to round 2 |
| VIC | Janey & Maddie | Offal | Beef Cheeks in Red Wine Sauce with Carrots and Polenta | Through to round 2 |
| WA | Hannah & Lawrence | Lamb | Crumbed Lamb Rack with Pea Puree | Through to Elimination Cook Off |
Dessert
| Team | | Main Ingredient | Dish | Result |
| NSW | Caz & Fergus | Cheese | Ricotta Fritters with Blackberry Sauce | Dish of the Day |
| WA | Mike & Pete | Chilli | Chilli Chocolate Tart with Raspberry Coulis | Through to Round 2 |
| VIC | Rob & Liam | Fruit | Mango & Gin Panna Cotta with Passionfruit Foam | Through to Round 2 |

==== Round 2 ====
- Episode 14
- Airdate — 21 October
- Description — 5 teams competed in the Kitchen HQ. The challenge was over two rounds; in round one 4 teams had to create a signature entrée in 60 minutes, the weakest team will be sent to the elimination cook off with Hannah & Lawrence. In the second round the remaining 4 teams had to create a signature main course in 90 minutes, and the strongest team will have the judges power at the elimination cook off where they help the judges decide who goes home, while the 3 remaining will compete in round 3.

Kitchen HQ Cook Off summary
Entree
| Team | | Dish | Result |
|---|---|---|---|
| NSW | Caz & Fergus | — | Fast-tracked to Main Round |
| WA | Mike & Pete | Lime Cured Scallops with Lime Creme Fraiche | Through to Main Round |
| VIC | Rob & Liam | Lamb Ribs with Chermoula and Toasted Nut Butter | Through to Main Round |
| VIC | Janey & Maddie | Tuna & Avocado Tartare with Nori Crisps | Through to Main Round |
| QLD | Simone & Vivana | Insalata Di Mare | Through to Elimination Cook Off |
Main
| Team | | Dish | Result |
| VIC | Rob & Liam | Wagyu Sirloin with Chinese Broccoli, Blistered Peppers and Sesame Garlic Sauce | Won Judges Power |
| NSW | Caz & Fergus | Lamb Rack with Mint Bearnaise and Braised Lettuce & Peas | Through to Round 3 |
| WA | Mike & Pete | Prawn Cutlets with Fennel & Pea Salad and Chilli Jam | Through to Round 3 |
| VIC | Janey & Maddie | Crispy Skin Barramundi with Caponata and Duck Fat Potatoes | Through to Round 3 |

==== Round 3 ====
- Episode 15
- Airdate — 22 October
- Description — 3 teams competed in the Kitchen HQ. The challenge was over two rounds; in round one 3 teams had to create a main course in 75 minutes inspired by family, the weakest team will be sent to the elimination cook off with Hannah & Lawrence and Simone & Viviana. As being the winners of the Judges Reward challenge, Rob & Liam will be guest judges in both rounds. In the second round the bottom 3 teams have to cook a Dessert in 75 minutes inspired by family, the team with the weakest score will be eliminated.

Kitchen HQ Cook Off summary
Main
| Team | | Dish | | | | Result |
|---|---|---|---|---|---|---|
| NSW | Caz & Fergus | Steak Diane with Roasted Zucchini and Colcannon | | | | Safe |
| VIC | Janey & Maddie | Pork Cotoletta with Brussels Sprouts and Apple Whisky Miso Sauce | | | | Safe |
| WA | Mike & Pete | Chicken Cacciatore with Blue Cheese Polenta | | | | Through to Elimination Cook Off |
Dessert
| Team | | Manu's Scores | Colin's Scores | Rob & Liam's Scores | Total (out of 30) | Result |
| QLD | Simone & Viviana | 9 | 9 | 9 | 27 | Safe |
| Dish | | Crostata ai Frutti Bosco | | | | Safe |
| WA | Mike & Pete | 7 | 7 | 7 | 21 | Safe |
| Dish | | Pavlova with Lemon Curd and Raspberry Coulis | | | | Safe |
| WA | Hannah & Lawrence | 6 | 6 | 7 | 19 | Eliminated |
| Dish | | Toasted Coconut Honey Ginger Cake with Lime Curd and Raspberry Coulis | | | | Eliminated |

=== Ultimate Instant Restaurants ===
- Episodes 16 to 20
- Airdate — 28 October to 11 November 2024
- Description — For the start of the finals round, the Top 5 teams head around the country once again in an Ultimate Instant Restaurant round. All teams have to cook two dishes of each course (entree, main and dessert) for their fellow finalists and judges for scoring. Guests have a choice of choosing one of the options per course while the judges Manu and Colin each taste one of the two options. The lowest scoring team is eliminated as the remaining four teams are ranked into the semifinals.

For the first time, open scoring was introduced for the other teams. Meaning all teams had to tell everyone how they score, controversially it was done after Rob & Liam had already been scored instead of before informing them.

Colour key:
– Judge's score for course option 1
– Judge's score for course option 2

Instant restaurant summary
Top 5
| Team and episode details | | | Guest scores | | | | | Manu's scores | | | Colin's scores | | | Total (out of 100) | Rank | Result |
| Team and episode details | | | R&L | C&F | S&V | M&P | J&M | Entrée | Main | Dessert | Entrée | Main | Dessert | Total (out of 100) | Rank | Result |
|---|---|---|---|---|---|---|---|---|---|---|---|---|---|---|---|---|
| VIC | Rob & Liam | | — | 5 | 6 | 5 | 5 | 6 | 6 | 4 | 7 | 8 | 5 | 57 | 5th | Eliminated |
| Ep 16 | 28 October 2024 | | Yakety Yaks | | | | | | | | | | | | | Eliminated |
| Dishes | Entrées | 1 | Morcilla Spring Rolls with Red Pepper Sauce and Charred Chorizo Crumb | | | | | | | | | | | | | Eliminated |
| Dishes | Entrées | 2 | Beef Cheek Tacos with Smoked Cheese Sauce and Pico De Gallo | | | | | | | | | | | | | Eliminated |
| Dishes | Mains | 1 | Peri Peri Woodfired Chicken with Chargrilled Corn and Garlic Aioli | | | | | | | | | | | | | Eliminated |
| Dishes | Mains | 2 | Sticky Pork Ribs with Charred Sprouts and Chimichurri | | | | | | | | | | | | | Eliminated |
| Dishes | Desserts | 1 | Passionfruit Bavarois with Lime Sorbet and Tequilla Jelly | | | | | | | | | | | | | Eliminated |
| Dishes | Desserts | 2 | Churros with Pistachio Mascarpone Cream and Liqueur & Chocolate Sauce | | | | | | | | | | | | | Eliminated |
| NSW | Caz & Fergus | | 5 | — | 6 | 6 | 6 | 7 | 5 | 7 | 8 | 7 | 5 | 62 | 4th | Safe |
| Ep 17 | 29 October 2024 | | Tunes & Spoons | | | | | | | | | | | | | Safe |
| Dishes | Entrées | 1 | Scallops Squared | | | | | | | | | | | | | Safe |
| Dishes | Entrées | 2 | Chicken Liver Parfait with Fig Chutney | | | | | | | | | | | | | Safe |
| Dishes | Mains | 1 | Slow Roasted Duck Massaman | | | | | | | | | | | | | Safe |
| Dishes | Mains | 2 | Steak Frites with Café de Paris Butter and Bone Marrow | | | | | | | | | | | | | Safe |
| Dishes | Desserts | 1 | Little Blackberry Puddings with Crème Anglaise | | | | | | | | | | | | | Safe |
| Dishes | Desserts | 2 | Strawberry & Mascarpone Meringue Cake | | | | | | | | | | | | | Safe |
| QLD | Simone & Viviana | | 7 | 6 | — | 6 | 6 | 9 | 6 | 10 | 4 | 5 | 9 | 68 | 1st | Safe |
| Ep 18 | 4 November 2024 | | Sotto Le Stelle (Under The Stars) | | | | | | | | | | | | | Safe |
| Dishes | Entrées | 1 | Prosciutto & Melon Cheesecake | | | | | | | | | | | | | Safe |
| Dishes | Entrées | 2 | Crostini di Polenta | | | | | | | | | | | | | Safe |
| Dishes | Mains | 1 | Papperdelle with Duck Ragù | | | | | | | | | | | | | Safe |
| Dishes | Mains | 2 | Risotto with Scampi and Stracciatella | | | | | | | | | | | | | Safe |
| Dishes | Desserts | 1 | Tiramisu | | | | | | | | | | | | | Safe |
| Dishes | Desserts | 2 | Sfogliatella Riccia | | | | | | | | | | | | | Safe |
| WA | Mike & Pete | | 6 | 6 | 6 | — | 5 | 4 | 8 | 9 | 6 | 6 | 7 | 63 | =2nd | Safe |
| Ep 19 | 5 November 2024 | | Twisted Lemons | | | | | | | | | | | | | Safe |
| Dishes | Entrées | 1 | Fish and Chips with Chilli Sauce | | | | | | | | | | | | | Safe |
| Dishes | Entrées | 2 | Mushroom Risotto | | | | | | | | | | | | | Safe |
| Dishes | Mains | 1 | Cauliflower Steak with Cannellini Bean Purée and Chimchurri | | | | | | | | | | | | | Safe |
| Dishes | Mains | 2 | Squid Ink Pasta with King Prawns | | | | | | | | | | | | | Safe |
| Dishes | Desserts | 1 | Crème Brûlée | | | | | | | | | | | | | Safe |
| Dishes | Desserts | 2 | Apple Custard Pie with Vanilla Bean Ice Cream | | | | | | | | | | | | | Safe |
| VIC | Janey & Maddie | | 5 | 7 | 6 | 6 | — | 8 | 6 | 5 | 5 | 7 | 8 | 63 | =2nd | Safe |
| Ep 20 | 11 November 2024 | | The Queen's Kitchen | | | | | | | | | | | | | Safe |
| Dishes | Entrées | 1 | Fettucine with Blue Swimmer Crab, Lemon & Chilli | | | | | | | | | | | | | Safe |
| Dishes | Entrées | 2 | Smoked Trout & Leek Tart | | | | | | | | | | | | | Safe |
| Dishes | Mains | 1 | Seafood Pie with Paris Mash and Tomato Relish | | | | | | | | | | | | | Safe |
| Dishes | Mains | 2 | Pan Fried Chicken Breast with Wild Mushroom and Truffle Potatoes | | | | | | | | | | | | | Safe |
| Dishes | Desserts | 1 | Salted Chocolate Tart with Mint Ice Cream | | | | | | | | | | | | | Safe |
| Dishes | Desserts | 2 | Pina Colada with Coconut Sorbert | | | | | | | | | | | | | Safe |

=== Semi Final ===
==== Kitchen HQ: Banquet-style Cook-off ====
- Episode 21
- Airdate — 12 November 2024
- Description — The Four remaining teams competed in the Quarter Final. The challenge was to make a banquet over two rounds; in round one teams had to create a main in 2 hours and in round 2 each team had to create a dessert within 60 minutes. The team with the highest score will face the lowest scoring team in the 1st Round of the Semi-final, whilst the remaining two went to the 2nd Semi-final. The highest scoring team from each round will have a 5 minute advantage for each course.

Kitchen HQ: Banquet style Cook-off summary
Banquet
| Team | | Dishes | Total (out of 40) | Result |
|---|---|---|---|---|
| NSW | Caz & Fergus | Spiced Lamb Shoulder with Middle Eastern Sides, Salads and Dips | 32 | 1st Through to Semi-Final Round 1 with Five-minute Time Advantage against Janey & Maddie |
| NSW | Caz & Fergus | Pistachio & Saffron Baklava Cake | 32 | 1st Through to Semi-Final Round 1 with Five-minute Time Advantage against Janey & Maddie |
| WA | Mike & Pete | Sesame Ginger Chicken with Miso Eggplant, Truffle Fried Rice and Charred Shishito Peppers | 31 | 2nd Through to Semi-Final Round 2 with Five-minute Time Advantage against Simone & Viviana |
| WA | Mike & Pete | Cannoli Tower with Miso and Yuzu Custards | 31 | 2nd Through to Semi-Final Round 2 with Five-minute Time Advantage against Simone & Viviana |
| QLD | Simone & Viviana | Lasagne with Orange & Fennel Salad and Broccolini | 30 | 3rd Through to Semi-Final Round 2 against Mike & Pete |
| QLD | Simone & Viviana | Maritozzi al Pistachio | 30 | 3rd Through to Semi-Final Round 2 against Mike & Pete |
| VIC | Janey & Maddie | Ocean Trout with Parsley & Macadamia Crumb, Creamy Potatoes, Honey Carrots and Charred Leeks | 25 | 4th Through to Semi-Final Round 1 against Caz & Fergus |
| VIC | Janey & Maddie | Gin & Tonic Tart with Vanilla Bean and Juniper Ice Cream | 25 | 4th Through to Semi-Final Round 1 against Caz & Fergus |

==== Round 1 ====
- Episode 22
- Airdate — 17 November 2024
- Description — Caz & Fergus compete against Janey & Maddie

Semi-Final Cook-Off Results
Semi-Final 1
| Team | | Dishes | Result |
|---|---|---|---|
| NSW | Caz & Fergus | Grilled Pork Jowl with Nahm Jim Jaew | Through to Grand Final |
| NSW | Caz & Fergus | Choo Chee Ocean Trout with Papaya Salad | Through to Grand Final |
| NSW | Caz & Fergus | Peanut Butter Panna Cotta with Chocolate Mousse and Butterscotch | Through to Grand Final |
| VIC | Janey & Maddie | Kingfish Ceviche | Eliminated |
| VIC | Janey & Maddie | Beef Wellington with Red Wine Jus and Spinach Puree | Eliminated |
| VIC | Janey & Maddie | Raspberry Soufflé with Raspberry Sauce | Eliminated |

==== Round 2 ====
- Episode 23
- Airdate — 18 November 2024
- Description — Mike & Pete compete against Simone & Viviana

Semi-Final Cook-Off Results
Semi-Final 2
| Team | | Dishes | Result |
|---|---|---|---|
| QLD | Simone & Viviana | Gnocco Fritto with Carpaccio Di Manzo | Through to Grand Final |
| QLD | Simone & Viviana | Risotto Salsiccia, Taleggio and Porcini | Through to Grand Final |
| QLD | Simone & Viviana | Rum Baba | Through to Grand Final |
| WA | Mike & Pete | Salmon Tartare with Balsamic Pearls and Crostini | Eliminated |
| WA | Mike & Pete | Crumbed Scotch Fillet with Mash Potato and Pickled Cabbage | Eliminated |
| WA | Mike & Pete | Ruby Chocolate Tart with Strawberry Ice Cream | Eliminated |

=== Grand Finale ===
- Episodes 24
- Airdate — 19 November
- Description — Simone & Viviana take on Caz & Fergus in this Grand Final. They had to cook a four-course meal for the judges, the eliminated teams and their family and friends, 25 plates per course. The judges including Manu, Colin and Julie scored each set of 4 meals out of 10 for the final verdict.

Grand Final
| Team | | Manu's Scores | Colin's Scores | Julie's Scores | Total (out of 30) | Result |
|---|---|---|---|---|---|---|
| QLD | Simone & Viviana | 9 | 9 | 9 | 27 | Winners |
| Dishes | | Sotto Le Stelle (Under The Stars) | | | | Winners |
| Entrée | | Lobster & Guanciale Taco | | | | Winners |
| Seafood Course | | Cappellacci Fagioli e Cozze | | | | Winners |
| Meat Course | | Lamb Rump with Pecorino Zabaione and Asparagus | | | | Winners |
| Dessert | | Paris-Brest with Hazelnut Praline | | | | Winners |
| NSW | Caz & Fergus | 8 | 9 | 8 | 25 | Runners-up |
| Dishes | | Tunes & Spoons | | | | Runners-up |
| Entrée | | FergBurg Spring Rolls with Gochujang Aioli | | | | Runners-up |
| Seafood Course | | Chargrilled Lemongrass Prawns with Vietnamese Chimichurri | | | | Runners-up |
| Meat Course | | Szechuan Beef Short Rib with Shallot Flatbread and Cabbage | | | | Runners-up |
| Dessert | | Tamarind Date Cake with White Soy Caramel and Coconut Pandan Sorbet | | | | Runners-up |

== Ratings ==
Colour Key:
– Highest Rating
– Lowest Rating
– Elimination Episode
– Finals Week

| Week | Episode | | Air date | Viewers (millions) (Note: Ratings data used is from OzTAM and represents the National Total audience.) | Nightly rank | Source |
|---|---|---|---|---|---|---|
| 1 | 1 | Instant Restaurant 1-1: Rob & Liam | Monday, 9 September | 0.757 | 4 | |
| 1 | 2 | Instant Restaurant 1-2: Ash & Cassie | Tuesday, 10 September | 0.705 | 5 | |
| 1 | 3 | Instant Restaurant 1-3: Simone & Viviana | Wednesday, 11 September | 0.879 | 4 | |
| 2 | 4 | Instant Restaurant 1-4: Danny & Sonia | Monday, 16 September | 0.858 | 5 | |
| 2 | 5 | Instant Restaurant 1-5: Hannah & Lawrence | Tuesday, 17 September | 0.837 | 5 | |
| 3 | 6 | Instant Restaurant 1-6: Mike & Pete | Tuesday, 24 September | 1.037 | 4 | |
| 3 | 7 | Instant Restaurant 2-1: Caz & Fergus | Wednesday, 25 September | 0.840 | 4 | |
| 4 | 8 | Instant Restaurant 2-2: Simone & Viviana | Monday, 30 September | 0.876 | 4 | |
| 4 | 9 | Instant Restaurant 2-3: Janey & Maddie | Tuesday, 1 October | 0.937 | 3 | |
| 5 | 10 | Instant Restaurant 2-4: Mike & Pete | Monday, 7 October | 0.823 | 5 | |
| 5 | 11 | Instant Restaurant 2-5: Hannah & Lawrence | Tuesday, 8 October | 0.915 | 4 | |
| 6 | 12 | Instant Restaurant 2-6: Robert & Andrea | Monday, 14 October | 0.930 | 5 | |
| 6 | 13 | Kitchen HQ Cook Off Round 1 | Tuesday, 15 October | 0.862 | 5 | |
| 7 | 14 | Kitchen HQ Cook Off Round 2 | Monday, 21 October | 0.874 | 4 | |
| 7 | 15 | Kitchen HQ Cook Off Round 3 | Tuesday, 22 October | 0.884 | 4 | |
| 8 | 16 | Ultimate Instant Restaurant 1: Rob & Liam | Monday, 28 October | 0.916 | 4 | |
| 8 | 17 | Ultimate Instant Restaurant 2: Caz & Fergus | Tuesday, 29 October | 0.932 | 4 | |
| 9 | 18 | Ultimate Instant Restaurant 3: Simone & Viviana | Monday, 4 November | 0.946 | 4 | |
| 9 | 19 | Ultimate Instant Restaurant 4: Mike & Pete | Tuesday, 5 November | 0.972 | 9 | |
| 10 | 20 | Ultimate Instant Restaurant 5: Janey & Maddie | Monday, 11 November | 1.053 | 3 | |
| 10 | 21 | Kitchen HQ: Banquet style Cook-off | Tuesday, 12 November | 0.996 | 3 | |
| 11 | 22 | Semi-Final Round 1 | Sunday, 17 November | 1.050 | 1 | |
| 11 | 23 | Semi-Final Round 2 | Monday, 18 November | 1.062 | 3 | |
| 11 | 24 | Grand Final | Tuesday, 19 November | 1.129 | 2 | |
