= My France with Manu =

- Title card of My France with Manu.
- Genre: Lifestyle; Cooking
- Starring: Manu Feildel
- Country of origin: Australia
- No. of series: 3
- No. of episodes: 6

Production
- Production location: France
- Running time: 60 minutes (inc. adverts)

Original release
- Network: Seven Network
- Release: 6 April 2014 – 14 April 2016

Related
- My Ireland with Colin

My France with Manu is an Australian television series screened on the Seven Network. The series follows French born chef and My Kitchen Rules judge Manu Feildel returning to his homeland, visiting friends and family, as well as cooking throughout the country.

The series was initially launched as a two part special, however following its success another two episodes were ordered.

The series inspired a spin-off, My Ireland with Colin, featuring another My Kitchen Rules judge Colin Fassnidge, which aired in April 2015.

== Broadcast ==
The first episode premiered in New South Wales and Queensland on 6 April 2015 and in other states on 10 April 2015 on the Seven Network (due to an AFL match airing in other states). The second season aired its two episodes on 22 February 2015 and 1 March 2015.

== Viewership ==
Ep	Title	Original airdate	Overnight Viewers	Nightly rank	Timeshifted Viewers	Adjusted rank	Ref
Season 1
1	"Episode 1"	6 April 2014	813,000	#6	857,000	#6	
2	"Episode 2"	13 April 2014	1,061,000	#6	1,150,000	#4	
Season 2
3	"The Rhone Valley: Part 1"	22 February 2015	841,000	#6	872,000	#7	
4	"The Rhone Valley: Part 2"	2 March 2015	798,000	#6	822,000	#8	
Season 3
5	"Paris"	7 April 2016	713,000	#7	752,000	#9	
6	"The Pyrenees"	14 April 2016	663,000	#9	698,000	#11	
