= My Kitchen Rules series 11 =

Series of television show

My Kitchen Rules: The Rivals
- Series 11
- No. of episodes: 29

Release
- Original network: Seven Network
- Original release: 2 February – 24 March 2020

Season chronology
- ← Previous; Series 10 (2019) Next → Series 12 (2022)

The eleventh season of the Australian competitive cooking competition show My Kitchen Rules, titled The Rivals, premiered on the Seven Network on 2 February 2020.

Applications for contestants opened during the airing of the tenth season. Pete Evans returned as series judge, with Colin Fassnidge and Manu Feildel acting as a judge/mentor in the challenge/elimination rounds.

The start date for the season was confirmed as 2 February 2020.

This was Evans' final season as he quit in May 2020.

== Format changes ==
- Contestants - This season was "Fans vs Favourites" - with 5 pairs of Fans competing against 5 pairs of Favourites - 4 pairs from past-seasons and a 5th Hybrid team, consisting of two former-pairs forming a new pair.
- Teams - The contestants were split into two teams, the Fans represented the House of Colin (Harbourside Mansion) and the Faves represented the House of Manu (Inner City Warehouse).
- Judges - Pete Evans quit judging this season. For every round as Manu Feildel will be a mentor along with Colin Fassnidge who will only judge their opposing teams.
- Prize Money - This prize money has been reduced from $250,000 to $100,000.
- Instant Restaurant Rules - Each team was mentored by Manu or Colin during their cooks. This year, the teams did not score individually and they scored in their house instead. After the round, the lowest scoring team from each house went head to head into an Elimination Cook-off where one was eliminated. The team cooking sets out instructions for the teammates to set up the instant restaurants during the cooking team's shopping period.
- Restaurant Takeover - Each house had to choose representations to cook two courses in restaurants in Australia. The judges, public and the other house scored each team's two-course meal and after the round, the house with the lower point (the total point of the representations) chose one team in the house while the other house chose one team to cook in the Elimination Cook-off.
- Semi-Final - Ultimate Instant Restaurant - Instead of the format of the previous seasons that two teams cooked-off every night, the Top 4 cooked in the UIR Round to have a slot in the Grand Final. However, everyone including teams which are eliminated came back to judge the food as jury. Moreover, teams only had to cook 1 dish per course instead of 2. After this round, the two highest scoring teams went into the Grand Final.
- Grand Final - This year, teams cooked in a restaurant in Sydney instead of the MKR Headquarters. Each grand-finalist had to cook a four-course meal including Canape, Entrée, Main and Dessert. Judges Pete, Manu and Colin voted, making the total possible score 30 instead of 60.

== Teams ==
State		Original Series	Previous Season Placing	Group	Members	Relationship	Status
QLD		4	2nd	Faves^{1}	Jake & Elle	Brother & Sister	Winners 24 March (Grand Finale)
QLD		4	1st	Faves	Dan & Steph	Married	Runners-up 24 March (Grand Finale)
VIC		—N/a		Fans	Mark & Lauren	Poker Playing Siblings	Eliminated 23 March (Semi-Final: Ultimate Instant Restaurant Round)
WA	QLD	—N/a		Fans	Kerry & Kaylene	Ex-Army Sisters	Eliminated 23 March (Semi-Final: Ultimate Instant Restaurant Round)
NSW		4/10	6th/2nd	Faves	Sophia & Romel	Tough Critics	Eliminated 11 March (Top 5: Finals Decider)
QLD		6	2nd	Faves	Jac & Shaz	Country Cousins	Eliminated 10 March (Top 6)
VIC		—N/a		Fans	Sue Ann & Sylvia	Childhood Friends	Eliminated 4 March (Top 7)
VIC		9	13th	Faves	Roula & Rachael	Best Friends	Eliminated 1 March (Top 8)
VIC		—N/a		Fans	Benjamin & Vasil	Bartenders	Eliminated 24 February (Top 9)
QLD		—N/a		Fans	Jenni & Louise	Mummy Bloggers	Eliminated 18 February (Instant Restaurant Round)

Note

^1 Jake and Elle were originally part of the House of Manu but in the Top 6 competed for the House of Colin due to the lack of teams in the challenge but then they chose to go back to House Manu.

== Elimination history ==
Teams' Competition Progress
Round:	Instant Restaurants		Top 9		Top 8		Top 7		Top 6		Top 5: Finals Decider		Semi-Final	Grand Finale
Round:	Instant Restaurants		RT	EC	RT	EC	RT	EC	RT	EC	Round 1	Round 2	UIR	Grand Finale
Teams	Progress													
Jake & Elle	9th (4th) (47)	→	Safe (65)	→	Lose (82)	→	Safe (72)	→	Safe^{2} (76)	→	→	Safe (35)	1st (98)	Winners (29)
Dan & Steph	2nd (1st) (65)	→	Safe (65)	→	Lose (82)	→	Safe (72)	→	Lose (59)	→	Win	—N/a	2nd (79)	Runners-up (27)
Mark & Lauren	7th (4th) (49)	→	Lose (50)	EC (73)	Safe (83)	→	Lose (62)	EC (80)	Safe (76)	→	→	Safe (24)	3rd (70)	Eliminated (Episode 28)
Kerry & Kaylene	1st (1st^{1}) (68)	→	Lose (50)	→	Safe (83)	→	Lose (62)	→	Safe (76)	→	→	Safe (25)	4th (46)	Eliminated (Episode 28)
Sophia & Romel	3rd (2nd) (64)	→	Safe (65)	→	Lose (82)	EC (92)	Safe (72)	→	Lose (59)	EC (94)	→	Lose (23)	Eliminated (Episode 24)	
Jac & Shaz	4th (3rd) (59)	→	Safe (65)	→	Lose (82)	→	Safe (72)	→	Lose (59)	EC (91)	Eliminated (Episode 23)			
Sue Ann & Sylvia	5th (2nd) (57)	→	Lose (50)	→	Safe (83)	→	Lose (62)	EC (74)	Eliminated (Episode 20)					
Roula & Rachael	10th (5th) (32)	EC (77)	Safe (65)	→	Lose (82)	EC (70)	Eliminated (Episode 17)							
Ben & Vasil	6th (3rd) (53)	→	Lose (50)	EC (72)	Eliminated (Episode 14)									
Jenni & Louise	8th (5th) (48)	EC (72)	Eliminated (Episode 11)											

Cell Descriptions
Faves	Team competed in the house of Manu.
Fans	Team competed in the house of Colin.
→	Team that is safe from elimination because they aren't chosen to cook in the Elimination Cook-off
	Team lost a challenge, cooked the weakest dish, received a low score and must compete in an additional round or challenge or received a penalty.
	Team won a challenge, People's Choice, cooked the best dish or received the highest score for the round.
Safe	Team was safe from elimination after passing a challenge/round.
→	Team continued to next the challenge/round.
EC	Team competed in an Elimination Cook-Off and became safe from elimination.
EC	Team was eliminated after losing in an Elimination Cook-Off or round.
—N/a	Results do not apply as the team was not allocated to this challenge or round.

Note

^1 The ranking on this list is from both houses as well as the individual houses. Individual house ranks are in brackets.
^2 Jake and Elle were originally part of the House of Manu but in the Top 6 competed for the House of Colin due to the lack of teams in the challenge but then they chose to go back to House Manu.

== Competition Details ==
=== Instant Restaurants ===
During the Instant Restaurant rounds, each team hosted a three-course dinner for judges and fellow teams in both house. They were scored and ranked among the guests, each house deciding the score together. After the round, the lowest scoring team from each house took part in an elimination cook-off.

- Episode 1 to 10
- Airdate – 2 February to 17 February
- Description – All teams joined for the instant restaurants. The Fans cooked in the House of Colin (Harbourside Mansion) and the Faves cooked in the House of Manu (Inner City Warehouse), and each team was helped by Manu or Colin. After the round, the lowest scoring team from each house took part in an elimination cook-off.

Instant Restaurant Summary
Team and Episode Details		Guest Scores		Pete's Scores			Manu's Scores			Colin's Scores			Total (out of 80)	Rank	Result
Team and Episode Details		Fans	Faves	Entrée	Main	Dessert	Entrée	Main	Dessert	Entrée	Main	Dessert	Total (out of 80)	Rank	Result
Fans	Jenni & Louise	7	5	9	2	8	7	3	7	—	—	—	48	8th (5th)	Through to Elimination Cook-off
Ep 1	2 February	Vivacious													Through to Elimination Cook-off
Dishes	Entrée	King Prawns with Seafood Bisque													Through to Elimination Cook-off
Dishes	Main	Duck with Fennel, Figs and Date Jus													Through to Elimination Cook-off
Dishes	Dessert	Strawberry Mousse with Pistachio and Lime													Through to Elimination Cook-off
Faves	Dan & Steph	8	9	8	10	8	—	—	—	7	8	7	65	2nd (1st^{2})	Safe
Ep 2	3 February	Decadence													Safe
Dishes	Entrée	Beetroot and Raspberry													Safe
Dishes	Main	Chicken and Corn													Safe
Dishes	Dessert	Poached Pear and Labneh													Safe
Fans	Ben & Vasil	6	5	6	8	8	5	6	9	—	—	—	53	6th (3rd)	Safe
Ep 3	4 February	Disco Mexico													Safe
Dishes	Entrée	Octopus Tostada													Safe
Dishes	Main	Rye Lamb Shoulder with Sangrita Roja													Safe
Dishes	Dessert	Margarita Tart													Safe
Faves	Jake & Elle	5	6	9	3	6	—	—	—	7	4	7	47	9th (4th)	Safe
Ep 4	5 February	Costa Del Sol													Safe
Dishes	Entrée	Fig Crudo with Gorgonzola													Safe
Dishes	Main	Squid Ink Cannelloni													Safe
Dishes	Dessert	Drunken PB & J Baba													Safe
Fans	Sue Ann & Sylvia	8	7	10	10	1	9	10	2	—	—	—	57	5th (2nd)	Safe
Ep 5	9 February	Alor Star													Safe
Dishes	Entrée	Pork & Chicken Satay Skewers													Safe
Dishes	Main	Har Mee													Safe
Dishes	Dessert	Coconut Cake with Strawberry													Safe
Faves	Jac & Shaz	8	6^{1}	7	8	7	—	—	—	8	7	8	59	4th (3rd)	Safe
Ep 6	10 February	Stack													Safe
Dishes	Entrée	Black Pudding Croquettes													Safe
Dishes	Main	Rib Eye with Smoked Butter and Confit Garlic													Safe
Dishes	Dessert	Mandarin Tart with Yoghurt Sorbet													Safe
Fans	Kerry & Kaylene	8	9	10	8	9	8	7	9	—	—	—	68	1st (1st)	Safe
Ep 7	11 February	Two Sisters													Safe
Dishes	Entrée	Pea Crumbed Barramundi with Beetroot Salad													Safe
Dishes	Main	Kangaroo with Sweet Potato													Safe
Dishes	Dessert	Pavlova													Safe
Faves	Roula & Rachael	5	6	4	1	5	—	—	—	5	1	5	32	10th (5th)	Through to Elimination Cook-off
Ep 8	12 February	House of Flava													Through to Elimination Cook-off
Dishes	Entrée	Lebanese Stuffed Vine Leaves													Through to Elimination Cook-off
Dishes	Main	Middle Eastern Beef & Okra Stew													Through to Elimination Cook-off
Dishes	Dessert	Walnut Katayef													Through to Elimination Cook-off
Fans	Mark & Lauren	6	5	6	9	3	6	7	7	—	—	—	49	7th (4th)	Safe
Ep 9	13 February	High Roller													Safe
Dishes	Entrée	Polenta Crushed Sardines with Chilli Mayo													Safe
Dishes	Main	Crispy Skinned Snapper with Lemon Risotto													Safe
Dishes	Dessert	Chévre Mousse with Honeycomb and Balsamic Grapes													Safe
Faves	Sophia & Romel	6	8	8	10	9	—	—	—	7	7	9	64	3rd (2nd)	Safe
Ep 10	17 February	D-Luxe													Safe
Dishes	Entrée	Prawn Fritters with Savath's Sauce													Safe
Dishes	Main	Beef & Eggplant													Safe
Dishes	Dessert	Middle Eastern Cheesecake													Safe

Notes

^1During Jac & Shaz's Instant Restaurant, Sophia & Romel walked out, therefore the scores are from the other 3 Faves team
^2 The ranking on this list is from both houses as well as the individual houses. Individual house ranks are in brackets.

==== Elimination Cook-off ====
- Episode 11
- Airdate – 18 February
- Description – Being the two bottom scoring teams from each house Roula & Rachael and Jenni & Louise faced off in an Elimination Cook-Off. The lower scoring team was eliminated.

Elimination Cook-Off Results
Elimination Cook-Off 1
Team		Guest Score		Pete's Scores			Manu's Scores			Colin's Scores			Total (out of 110)	Result
Team		Fans	Faves	Entrée	Main	Dessert	Entrée	Main	Dessert	Entrée	Main	Dessert	Total (out of 110)	Result
Faves	Roula & Rachael	7	9	10	8	3	10	7	4	9	7	3	77	Safe
Dishes	Entrée	Stuffed Mushroom												Safe
Dishes	Main	Gnocchi with Burnt Butter Sauce												Safe
Dishes	Dessert	Whipped Panna Cotta												Safe
Fans	Jenni & Louise	8	5	4	7	9	5	7	8	4	7	8	72	Eliminated
Dishes	Entrée	Mushroom Medley												Eliminated
Dishes	Main	Beef Cheeks with Sweet Potato Mash												Eliminated
Dishes	Dessert	Chocolate Torte with Raspberry Ice Cream												Eliminated

=== Top 9 ===
==== Faves Restaurant Takeover: Mexican Street Food Challenge ====
- Episode 12
- Airdate – 19 February
- Description – The Faves selected three teams to represent their house at El Camini Cantina The Rocks for the challenge. Each representing team cooked two courses for the judges, the other teams and the public. After both houses cooked, the lowest scoring house had each team from that house participate in an elimination challenge.

Team		Guest Score	Pete's Score	Colin's Score	Public Average	Total (out of 40)	House Total (out of 120)	Result
Team		Fans	Pete's Score	Colin's Score	Public Average	Total (out of 40)	House Total (out of 120)	Result
Faves	Jake & Elle	6	9	8	8	31	65	Safe
Dishes	Main	Chipotle Chicken with Elotes					65	Safe
Dishes	Dessert	Buñuelos with Dulce De Leche					65	Safe
Faves	Dan & Steph	5	5	5	7	22	65	Safe
Dishes	Main	Salmon and Corn					65	Safe
Dishes	Dessert	Sweet Potato and Pecans					65	Safe
Faves	Sophia & Romel	1	2	2	7	12	65	Safe
Dishes	Main	Pork Pozole					65	Safe
Dishes	Dessert	Chocolate Delice					65	Safe

==== Fans Restaurant Takeover: Asian Street Food Challenge ====
- Episode 13
- Airdate – 20 February
- Description – The Fans selected three teams to represent their house at District 8 for the challenge. Each representing team cooked two courses for the judges, the other teams and the public. After both houses cooked, the lowest scoring house had each team from that house participate in an elimination challenge.

Team		Guest Score	Pete's Score	Manu's Score	Public Average	Total (out of 40)	House Total (out of 120)	Result
Team		Faves	Pete's Score	Manu's Score	Public Average	Total (out of 40)	House Total (out of 120)	Result
Fans	Mark & Lauren	3	6	5	6	20	50	Through to Elimination Cook-off
Dishes	Main	Beef & Pork Ma Po					50	Through to Elimination Cook-off
Dishes	Dessert	Jackfruit & Pineapple Crumble					50	Through to Elimination Cook-off
Fans	Kerry & Kaylene	4	5	5	6	20	50	Through to Elimination Cook-off
Dishes	Main	Spicy Chicken with Rice					50	Through to Elimination Cook-off
Dishes	Dessert	Coconut Rice Pudding					50	Through to Elimination Cook-off
Fans	Sue Ann & Sylvia	1	2	2	5	10	50	Through to Elimination Cook-off
Dishes	Main	Pork Belly Bun					50	Through to Elimination Cook-off
Dishes	Dessert	Banana Fritters					50	Through to Elimination Cook-off

==== Elimination Cook-off ====
- Episode 14
- Airdate – 24 February
- Description – Two teams from House of Colin faced each other in an elimination cook-off. The first team to compete was selected by House of Manu, while the second team to compete was chosen by House of Colin among themselves. The lower scoring team was eliminated.

Elimination Cook-Off 2
Team		Guest Score		Pete's Scores			Manu's Scores			Colin's Scores			Total (out of 110)	Result
Team		Fans	Faves	Entrée	Main	Dessert	Entrée	Main	Dessert	Entrée	Main	Dessert	Total (out of 110)	Result
Fans	Mark & Lauren	7	6	7	10	3	6	10	3	7	10	4	73	Safe
Dishes	Entrée	Octopus with Harissa												Safe
Dishes	Main	Goat Curry with Roti												Safe
Dishes	Dessert	Lemon Syrup Cake												Safe
Fans	Ben & Vasil	8	7	10	8	2	8	8	2	8	8	3	72	Eliminated
Dishes	Entrée	Achiote Prawns												Eliminated
Dishes	Main	Sirloin with Chimichurri												Eliminated
Dishes	Dessert	Chocolate Crème Caramel												Eliminated

=== Top 8 ===
==== Faves Restaurant Takeover: Pub Grub Challenge ====
- Episode 15
- Airdate – 25 February
- Description – The Faves selected three teams to represent their house at The Imperial Hotel - Drag N' Dine for the challenge. Each representing team cooked two courses for the judges, the other teams, the guested drag queens and the public. After both houses cooked, the lowest scoring house had each team from that house participate in an elimination challenge.

Team		Guest Score	Pete's Score	Colin's Score	Public Average	Total (out of 40)	House Total (out of 120)	Result
Team		Fans	Pete's Score	Colin's Score	Public Average	Total (out of 40)	House Total (out of 120)	Result
Faves	Jac & Shaz	7	9	8	8	32	82	Through to Elimination Cook-off
Dishes	Main	Chicken Schnitzel with Potato Salad					82	Through to Elimination Cook-off
Dishes	Dessert	Fig and Maple Cake					82	Through to Elimination Cook-off
Faves	Jake & Elle	6	9	5	7	27	82	Through to Elimination Cook-off
Dishes	Main	Stout Corned Beef					82	Through to Elimination Cook-off
Dishes	Dessert	Bread and Butter Pudding					82	Through to Elimination Cook-off
Faves	Roula & Rachael	5	6	6	6	23	82	Through to Elimination Cook-off
Dishes	Main	Cottage Pie					82	Through to Elimination Cook-off
Dishes	Dessert	Red Wine Poached Pear					82	Through to Elimination Cook-off

==== Fans Restaurant Takeover: Pub Classics Challenge ====
- Episode 16
- Airdate – 26 February
- Description – The Fans selected three teams to represent their house at The Terminus Hotel for the challenge. Each representing team cooked two courses for the judges, the other team and the public. After both houses cooked, the lowest scoring house had each team from that house participate in an elimination challenge.

Team		Guest Score	Pete's Score	Manu's Score	Public Average	Total (out of 40)	House Total (out of 120)	Result
Team		Faves	Pete's Score	Manu's Score	Public Average	Total (out of 40)	House Total (out of 120)	Result
Fans	Kerry & Kaylene	6	7	8	8	29	83	Safe
Dishes	Main	Lamb Shank with Mash					83	Safe
Dishes	Dessert	Pear & Berry Tart					83	Safe
Fans	Sue Ann & Sylvia	5	8	7	8	28	83	Safe
Dishes	Main	Spiced Chicken with Sweet Potato					83	Safe
Dishes	Dessert	Flourless Chocolate Cake					83	Safe
Fans	Mark & Lauren	3	9	7	7	26	83	Safe
Dishes	Main	Fish & Chips					83	Safe
Dishes	Dessert	Stout & Chocolate Mousse					83	Safe

==== Elimination Cook-off ====
- Episode 17
- Airdate – 1 March
- Description – Two teams from House of Manu faced each other in an elimination cook-off. The first team to compete was selected by House of Colin, while the second team to compete was chosen by House of Manu among themselves. The lower scoring team was eliminated.

Elimination Cook-Off 3
Team		Guest Score		Pete's Scores			Manu's Scores			Colin's Scores			Total (out of 110)	Result
Team		Fans	Faves	Entrée	Main	Dessert	Entrée	Main	Dessert	Entrée	Main	Dessert	Total (out of 110)	Result
Faves	Sophia & Romel	7	8	7	10	9	7	10	9	7	9	9	92	Safe
Dishes	Entrée	Prawn & Lemongrass Salad												Safe
Dishes	Main	Tamarind & Chilli Crab												Safe
Dishes	Dessert	Pistachio Cake with Halva Ice Cream												Safe
Faves	Roula & Rachael	6	6	7	8	5	7	7	5	7	7	5	70	Eliminated
Dishes	Entrée	Scallop and Betel Leaf												Eliminated
Dishes	Main	Paella												Eliminated
Dishes	Dessert	Nonna's Doughnuts												Eliminated

=== Top 7 ===
==== Faves Restaurant Takeover: Modern Australia Challenge ====
- Episode 18
- Airdate – 2 March
- Description – The Faves selected three teams to represent their house at Meat & Wine Co. for the challenge. Each representing team cooked two courses of Mod Aus for the judges, the other teams and the public. After both houses cooked, the lowest scoring house had each team from that house participate in an elimination challenge.

Team		Guest Score	Pete's Score	Colin's Score	Public Average	Total (out of 40)	House Total (out of 120)	Result
Team		Fans	Pete's Score	Colin's Score	Public Average	Total (out of 40)	House Total (out of 120)	Result
Faves	Jac & Shaz	6	10	8	8	32	72	Safe
Dishes	Main	Macadamia Crusted Pork & Apple					72	Safe
Dishes	Dessert	Chocolate Tart with Raspberry Cream					72	Safe
Faves	Sophia & Romel	5	7	5	7	24	72	Safe
Dishes	Main	Confit Trout and Potato					72	Safe
Dishes	Dessert	Lemon Jelly					72	Safe
Faves	Dan & Steph	3	4	4	5	16	72	Safe
Dishes	Main	Balinese Duck Curry					72	Safe
Dishes	Dessert	Black Sesame Chiffon					72	Safe

==== Fans Restaurant Takeover: Modern Australia Challenge ====
- Episode 19
- Airdate – 3 March
- Description – The Fans selected three teams to represent their house at Butcher And The Farmer for the challenge. Each representing team cooked two courses for the judges, the other team and the public. After both houses cooked, the lowest scoring house had each team from that house participate in an elimination challenge.

Team		Guest Score	Pete's Score	Manu's Score	Public Average	Total (out of 40)	House Total (out of 120)	Result
Team		Faves	Pete's Score	Manu's Score	Public Average	Total (out of 40)	House Total (out of 120)	Result
Fans	Mark & Lauren	4	6	6	8	24	62	Through to Elimination Cook-off
Dishes	Main	Mediterranean Seafood Stew					62	Through to Elimination Cook-off
Dishes	Dessert	Ginger Pudding with Custard					62	Through to Elimination Cook-off
Fans	Kerry & Kaylene	5	6	5	7	23	62	Through to Elimination Cook-off
Dishes	Main	Crocodile with Macadamia					62	Through to Elimination Cook-off
Dishes	Dessert	Choc Cherry Slice					62	Through to Elimination Cook-off
Fans	Sue Ann & Sylvia	2	4	4	5	15	62	Through to Elimination Cook-off
Dishes	Main	Dahl with Chapati					62	Through to Elimination Cook-off
Dishes	Dessert	Pineapple Tart					62	Through to Elimination Cook-off

==== Elimination Cook-off ====
- Episode 20
- Airdate – 4 March
- Description – Two teams from House of Colin faced each other in an elimination cook-off. The first team to compete was selected by House of Manu, while the second team to compete was chosen by House of Colin among themselves. The lower scoring team was eliminated.

Elimination Cook-Off 4
Team		Guest Score		Pete's Scores			Manu's Scores			Colin's Scores			Total (out of 110)	Result
Team		Fans	Faves	Entrée	Main	Dessert	Entrée	Main	Dessert	Entrée	Main	Dessert	Total (out of 110)	Result
Fans	Mark & Lauren	6	6	1	9	8	10	7	8	8	9	8	80	Safe
Dishes	Entrée	Roast Quail with Chestnuts												Safe
Dishes	Main	Scotch Fillet and Peperonata												Safe
Dishes	Dessert	Peach Tarte Tatin												Safe
Fans	Sue Ann & Sylvia	5	6	8	8	6	8	8	5	7	7	6	74	Eliminated
Dishes	Entrée	Otak Otak												Eliminated
Dishes	Main	Pork Belly with Sambal Green Beans												Eliminated
Dishes	Dessert	Coconut Sago Pudding												Eliminated

=== Top 6 ===
==== Faves Restaurant Takeover: Fine Dining Challenge ====
- Episode 21
- Airdate – 8 March
- Description – The remaining Faves teams cooked two courses of Fine Dining at Stanton & Co. for the judges, the other teams and the public. After both houses cooked, the lowest scoring house had each team from that house participate in an elimination challenge.

Team		Guest Score	Pete's Score	Colin's Score	Public Average	Total (out of 40)	House Total (out of 120)	Result
Team		Fans	Pete's Score	Colin's Score	Public Average	Total (out of 40)	House Total (out of 120)	Result
Faves	Jac & Shaz	4	6	6	8	24	59	Through to Elimination Cook-off
Dishes	Main	Miso Salmon					59	Through to Elimination Cook-off
Dishes	Dessert	Cherry Cheesecake					59	Through to Elimination Cook-off
Faves	Dan & Steph	5	6	6	6	23	59	Through to Elimination Cook-off
Dishes	Main	Mackerel, Peppers and Horseradish					59	Through to Elimination Cook-off
Dishes	Dessert	Lychee Ice Cream with Jasmine Dacquoise					59	Through to Elimination Cook-off
Faves	Sophia & Romel	3	2	2	5	12	59	Through to Elimination Cook-off
Dishes	Main	Beef Brisket with Yellow Noodles					59	Through to Elimination Cook-off
Dishes	Dessert	Saffron Rice Pudding with Apricots					59	Through to Elimination Cook-off

==== Fans Restaurant Takeover: Fine Dining Challenge ====
- Episode 22
- Airdate – 9 March
- Description – The remaining Fans teams cooked two courses of Fine Dining at Nour for the judges, the other teams and the public. After both houses cooked, the lowest scoring house had each team from that house participate in an elimination challenge.

Team		Guest Score	Pete's Score	Manu's Score	Public Average	Total (out of 40)	House Total (out of 120)	Result
Team		Faves	Pete's Score	Manu's Score	Public Average	Total (out of 40)	House Total (out of 120)	Result
Faves	Jake & Elle^{1}	5	9	8	7	29	76	Safe
Dishes	Main	Veal Saltimbocca with Gratin					76	Safe
Dishes	Dessert	Burnt Honey and Passionfruit Millefeuille					76	Safe
Fans	Mark & Lauren	4	9	7	5	25	76	Safe
Dishes	Main	Watercress Soup with Cod and Clam					76	Safe
Dishes	Dessert	Chocolate Fondant with Blood Orange Sorbet					76	Safe
Fans	Kerry & Kaylene	3	6	6	7	22	76	Safe
Dishes	Main	Harissa Crusted Lamb with Cauliflower Puree					76	Safe
Dishes	Dessert	Poached Peach with Raspberry Sorbet					76	Safe

Note

^1Jake and Elle were originally part of the House of Manu but in the Top 6 competed for the House of Colin due to the lack of teams in the challenge but then they go back to House Manu (in the semi-finals).

==== Elimination Cook-off ====
- Episode 23
- Airdate – 10 March
- Description – Two teams from House of Manu faced each other in an elimination cook-off. The first team to compete is selected by House of Colin, while the second team to compete is chosen by House of Manu among themselves. The lower scoring team was eliminated.

Elimination Cook-Off 5
Team		Guest Score		Pete's Scores			Manu's Scores			Colin's Scores			Total (out of 110)	Result
Team		Fans	Faves	Entrée	Main	Dessert	Entrée	Main	Dessert	Entrée	Main	Dessert	Total (out of 110)	Result
Faves	Sophia & Romel	7	8	9	9	10	9	7	10	8	7	10	94	Safe
Dishes	Entrée	Salmon Kibbeh Nayeh												Safe
Dishes	Main	Bream with Green Mango Salad												Safe
Dishes	Dessert	Chocolate and Cardamon Tart												Safe
Faves	Jac & Shaz	7	8	9	8	10	9	7	10	8	7	8	91	Eliminated
Dishes	Entrée	Zucchini Flowers and Prawns												Eliminated
Dishes	Main	Sticky BBQ Ribs with Sweet Potato												Eliminated
Dishes	Dessert	Banoffee Pie												Eliminated

=== Top 5: Finals Decider ===
- Episode 24
- Airdate – 11 March
- Description – All remaining teams gathered at Colin's House for these challenges. They all cooked their platter on a barbecue. In the first round, they had 30 minutes to cook a vegetarian platter for the judges and their families. The judges decided the winning team which sat out from the next challenge, while the other 4 teams cooked a family meatlover platter for the judges, the judges' families and their families in 90 minutes. The lowest scoring team in the second challenge was eliminated.

Round 1: Vegetarian BBQ Challenge
Team		Dish				Result	
Faves	Dan & Steph	Quesadillas with Honey Guacamole				Safe	
Faves	Sophia & Romel	Spicy Eggplant				Through to next round	
Faves	Jake & Elle	Falafel with Tahini Sauce				Through to next round	
Fans	Mark & Lauren	Thai Larb				Through to next round	
Fans	Kerry & Kaylene	Loaded Nachos				Through to next round	
Round 2: Family Meatlover BBQ Challenge
Team		Pete's Score	Manu's Score	Colin's Score	Families Average	Total (out of 40)	Result
Faves	Jake & Elle	10	9	9	7	35	Safe
Dishes		Marinated Lamb Skewers					Safe
Fans	Kerry & Kaylene	6	7	7	5	25	Safe
Dishes		Porterhouse Steak with Stuffed Mushroom					Safe
Fans	Mark & Lauren	6	6	6	6	24	Safe
Dishes		Pork Scotch with Orange Relish					Safe
Faves	Sophia & Romel	6	6	6	5	23	Eliminated
Dishes		Grilled Beef and Noodle Salad					Eliminated

=== Semi-final ===
==== Ultimate Instant Restaurants ====
- Episodes 25 to 28
- Air date — 15 to 23 March
- Description — The four remaining teams joined for the Ultimate Instant Restaurant round using the same format as for the Instant Restaurant Round. Other teams who had been eliminated came to judge the food and act as a jury, while the finalists were scored individually. The two teams with the highest score went into the Grand Final. Unlike previous Ultimate Instant Restaurants, teams only had to serve 1 option per course.

Ultimate Instant Restaurant Summary
Top 4
Team and Episode Details		Guest Scores					Pete's Scores			Manu's Scores			Colin's Scores			Total (out of 100)	Rank	Result
Team and Episode Details		D&S	K&K	J&E	M&L	Jury	Entrée	Main	Dessert	Entrée	Main	Dessert	Entrée	Main	Dessert	Total (out of 100)	Rank	Result
Faves	Dan & Steph	—	7	7	7	7	8	8	10	—	—	—	8	7	10	79	2nd	Through to Grand Final
Ep 25	15 March	Decadence																Through to Grand Final
Dishes	Entrées	Cauliflower Steaks and Walnut																Through to Grand Final
Dishes	Main	Lamb Sausages with Lentils																Through to Grand Final
Dishes	Dessert	Orange Polenta Cake with Parfait																Through to Grand Final
Fans	Kerry & Kaylene	4	—	4	4	4	2	9	4	2	8	5	—	—	—	46	4th	Eliminated
Ep 26	16 March	Two Sisters																Eliminated
Dishes	Entrées	Duck Liver Pate with Tamarillo																Eliminated
Dishes	Main	Chicken with Sage and Onion																Eliminated
Dishes	Dessert	Peanut Parfait and Banana Cake																Eliminated
Faves	Jake & Elle	10	10	—	10	10	10	10	10	—	—	—	8	10	10	98	1st	Through to Grand Final
Ep 27	17 March	Costa Del Sol																Through to Grand Final
Dishes	Entrées	Cured Salmon and Citrus																Through to Grand Final
Dishes	Main	Crispy Skin Porchetta with Cavolo Nero																Through to Grand Final
Dishes	Dessert	Tiramisu																Through to Grand Final
Fans	Mark & Lauren	6	6^{1}	6	—	6	9	10	6	9	7	5	—	—	—	70	3rd	Eliminated
Ep 28	23 March	High Roller																Eliminated
Dishes	Entrées	Scallops with Smoked Potato Aioli																Eliminated
Dishes	Main	Fried Chicken, Carrots and Peas																Eliminated
Dishes	Dessert	Apple Strudel with Honey Ice Cream																Eliminated

Notes

^{1} Despite losing their chance to be in the Grand Final in Episode 27 due to having the lowest score, Kerry and Kaylene scored individually at Mark and Lauren's UIR as they were still a Finalist team and were not officially eliminated until Mark and Lauren's scores were revealed.

=== Grand Final ===
- Episodes 29
- Air date — 24 March
- Description — Jake and Elle took on Dan and Steph in this Grand Final rematch from the fourth season. They had to cook a four-course meal for the judges, the eliminated teams and their family and friends. The judges scored each set of 4 meals out of 10 for the final verdict.

Grand Final
Team		Pete's Scores	Manu's Scores	Colin's Scores	Total (out of 30)	Result
Faves	Jake & Elle	10	9	10	29	Winners
Dishes		Costa Del Sol				Winners
Canape		Trout Tartare and Smoked Roe				Winners
Entrée		Burrata with Tomatoes				Winners
Main		Rabbit with Polenta and Pancetta				Winners
Dessert		Lemon Dolce				Winners
Faves	Dan & Steph	9	9	9	27	Runners-up
Dishes		Decadence				Runners-up
Canape		Scallops with Apple and Cucumber				Runners-up
Entrée		Ham Hock Terrine and Pigs Ears				Runners-up
Main		Beef Bourguignon with Root Vegetables				Runners-up
Dessert		Hazelnut and Chocolate				Runners-up

== Ratings ==
Colour Key:
– Highest Rating
– Lowest Rating
– Elimination Episode
– Finals Week

Week	Episode		Air date	Viewers (millions) (Note: Ratings data used is from OzTAM and represents the live and same day average viewership from the 5 largest Australian metropolitan centres (Sydney, Melbourne, Brisbane, Perth and Adelaide).)	Nightly rank	Source
1	1	Instant Restaurant 1: Jenni & Louise	Sunday, 2 February	0.498	10	
1	2	Instant Restaurant 2: Dan & Steph	Monday, 3 February	0.517	16	
1	3	Instant Restaurant 3: Ben & Vasil	Tuesday, 4 February	0.402	17	
1	4	Instant Restaurant 4: Jake & Elle	Wednesday, 5 February	0.428	15	
2	5	Instant Restaurant 5: Sue Ann & Sylvia	Sunday, 9 February	0.476	10	
2	6	Instant Restaurant 6: Jac & Shaz	Monday, 10 February	0.439	17	
2	7	Instant Restaurant 7: Kerry & Kaylene	Tuesday, 11 February	0.455	15	
2	8	Instant Restaurant 8: Roula & Rachael	Wednesday, 12 February	0.422	17	
2	9	Instant Restaurant 9: Mark & Lauren	Thursday, 13 February	0.517	8	
3	10	Instant Restaurant 10: Sophia & Romel	Monday, 17 February	0.501	16	
3	11	Elimination Cook-Off 1	Tuesday, 18 February	0.461	14	
3	12	Top 9 - Faves Restaurant Takeover 1: Mexican Street Food Challenge	Wednesday, 19 February	0.416	17	
3	13	Top 9 - Fans Restaurant Takeover 1: Asian Street Food Challenge	Thursday, 20 February	0.501	8	
4	14	Elimination Cook-Off 2	Monday, 24 February	0.489	16	
4	15	Top 8 - Faves Restaurant Takeover 2: Pub Grub Challenge	Tuesday, 25 February	0.473	15	
4	16	Top 8 - Fans Restaurant Takeover 2: Pub Classics Challenge	Wednesday, 26 February	0.453	16	
5	17	Elimination Cook-Off 3	Sunday, 1 March	0.482	7	
5	18	Top 7 - Faves Restaurant Takeover 3: Modern Australia Challenge	Monday, 2 March	0.451	15	
5	19	Top 7 - Fans Restaurant Takeover 3: Modern Australia Challenge	Tuesday, 3 March	0.489	13	
5	20	Elimination Cook-Off 4	Wednesday, 4 March	0.501	14	
6	21	Top 6 - Faves Restaurant Takeover 4: Fine Dining Challenge	Sunday, 8 March	0.395	8	
6	22	Top 6 - Fans Restaurant Takeover 4: Fine Dining Challenge	Monday, 9 March	0.483	17	
6	23	Elimination Cook-Off 5	Tuesday, 10 March	0.490	14	
6	24	Top 5 - Finals Decider: Family Barbecue Challenge	Wednesday, 11 March	0.412	17	
7	25	Semi-Final - Ultimate Instant Restaurant 1: Dan & Steph	Sunday, 15 March	0.473	8	
7	26	Semi-Final - Ultimate Instant Restaurant 2: Kerry & Kaylene	Monday, 16 March	0.476	20	
7	27	Semi-Final - Ultimate Instant Restaurant 3: Jake & Elle	Tuesday, 17 March	0.468	16	
8	28	Semi-Final - Ultimate Instant Restaurant 4: Mark & Lauren	Monday, 23 March	0.508	20	
8	29	Grand Final	Tuesday, 24 March	0.553	17	
