= Willie Mataka =

Tonga international rugby league footballer

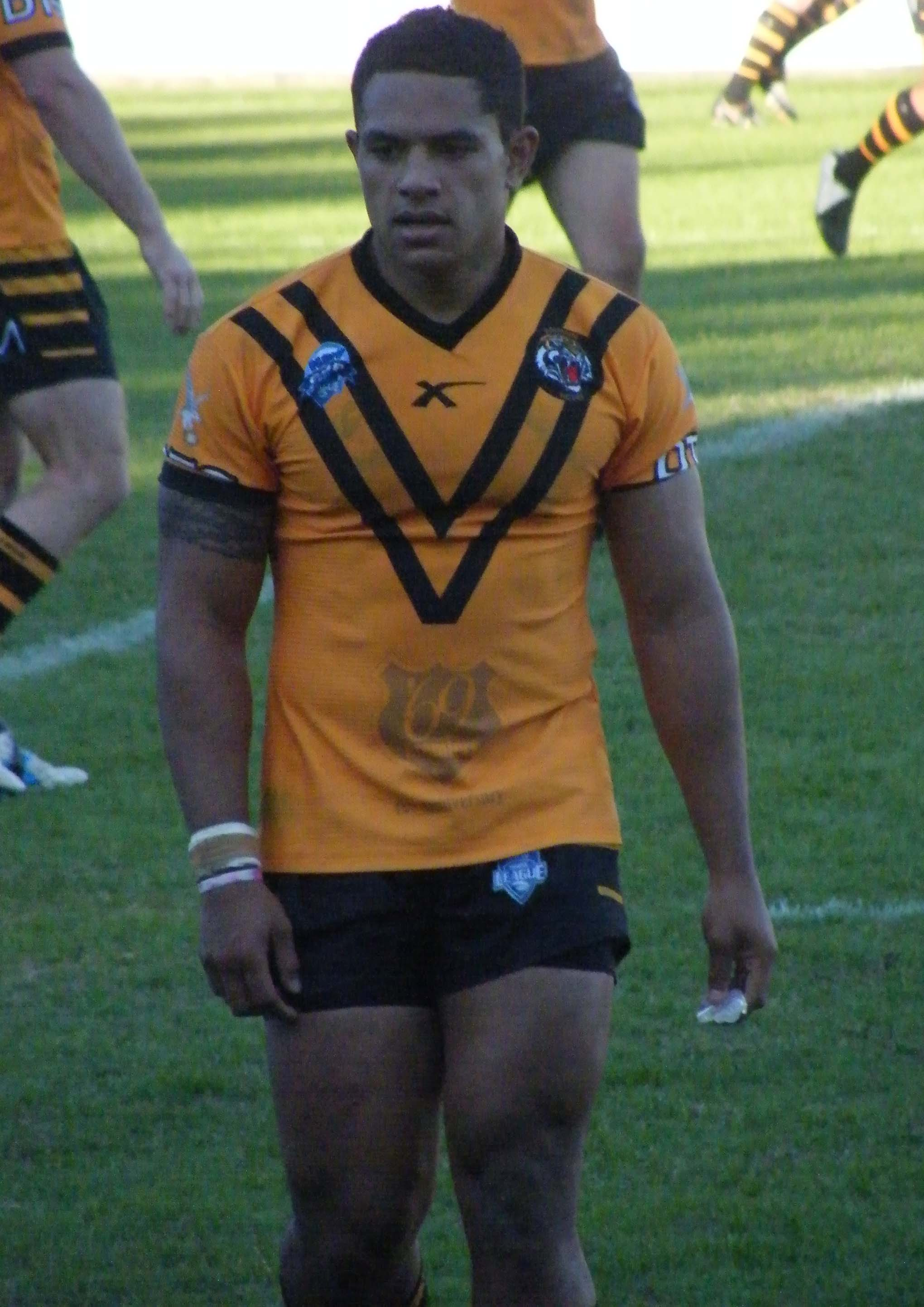

Personal information
- Full name: Viliami Mataka
- Born: 18 October 1988 (age 38)
- Height: 1.83 m (6 ft 0 in)
- Weight: 102 kg (16 st 1 lb)

Playing information
- Position: Second-row, Centre
Club
Years	Team	Pld	T	G	FG	P
2009–10	Wests Tigers	6	1	0	0	4
2011	Sydney Roosters	2	0	0	0	0
	Total	8	1	0	0	4
Representative
Years	Team	Pld	T	G	FG	P
2009	Tonga	2	1	0	0	4

Willie Mataka (born 18 October 1988) is a former Tonga rugby league footballer who last played for the Mount Pritchard Mounties in the NSW Cup. He played mostly as a second-row forward. He won My Kitchen Rules series 15 in 2025 along with Justin.

== Background ==
Mataka played junior football with the East Campbelltown Eagles.

== Playing career ==
Mataka made his first-grade debut for the Wests Tigers against South Sydney in round 10 of the 2009 NRL season at the Sydney Cricket Ground. Wests would lose the match 23–22. Mataka joined the Sydney Roosters in 2011, and made two appearances that year. Mataka joined the Parramatta Eels in 2012, and the St. George Illawarra Dragons in 2014, but failed to make a first-grade appearance at either club. In 2015, he joined the Mount Pritchard Mounties where he played until 2019, making a total of 37 appearances.

== Career highlights ==
- First Grade Debut: 2009 – Round 10, Wests Tigers vs Rabbitohs, 17 May.
