= Salt bread =

Japanese bread

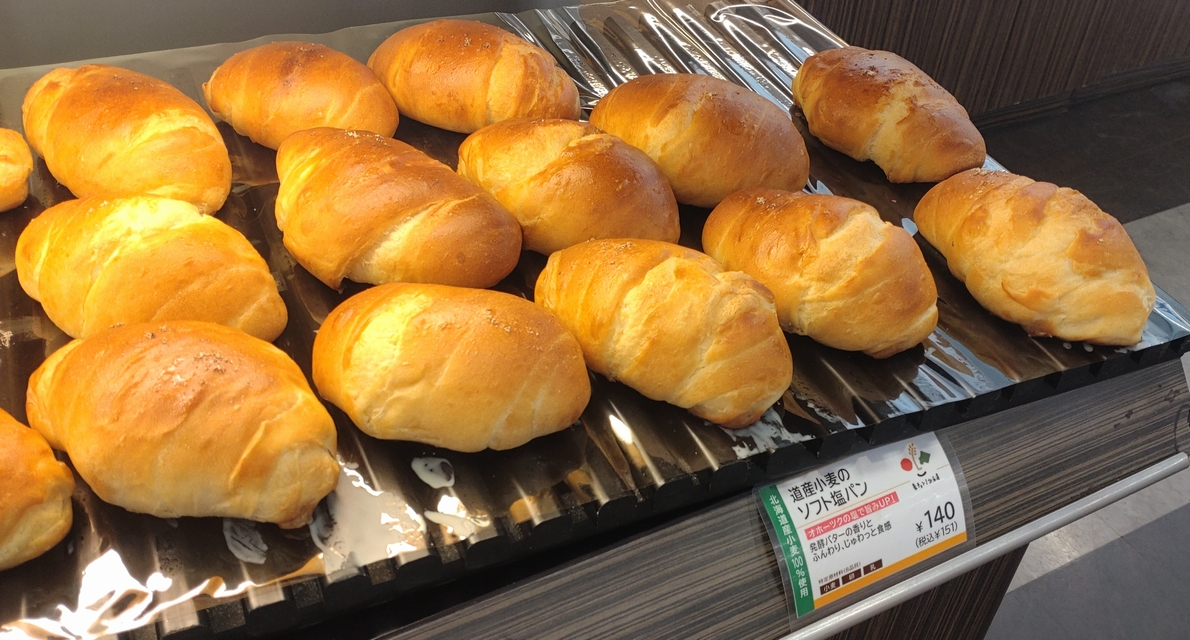
- Salt bread at a Japanese supermarket
- Type: Viennoiserie
- Place of origin: Japan
- Main ingredients: dough, butter, salt

Salt bread, called shio pan (塩パン, shiopan) is a Japanese buttery roll.

Salt bread originated in the Ehime prefecture in Japan around 2014 and was popularized by the Pain Maison bakery. The butter steams during the baking process, leaving a hollow interior and crispy base. It may come with a variety of sweet and savory fillings, including custard, cheese, and mochi.
