= Colin Fassnidge =

Irish-Australian chef and author

- Born: Dublin, County Dublin, Ireland
- Citizenship: Ireland; Australia
- Occupations: Chef; author; television personality
- Television: My Kitchen Rules; I’m A Celebrity…Get Me Out Of Here! Australia
- Spouse: Jane Hyland
- Children: 2

Colin Fassnidge is an Irish chef, author and television presenter. Fassnidge has appeared as a judge on My Kitchen Rules since 2013 and is also a presenter on the home lifestyle program Better Homes and Gardens, presenting the food segments alongside Clarissa Feildel. He previously hosted Kitchen Nightmares Australia in 2022, where he was introduced as the first chef with a pub that earned two Chef's Hats in Australia.

== Career ==
Fassnidge previously operated the restaurants Four in Hand and 4Fourteen. He now owns Banksia. Fassnidge also operates The Castlereagh by Fassnidge bistro at City Tattersalls Club.

Fassnidge served as a judge on the Australian cooking show My Kitchen Rules in the Kitchen HQ cook off and final rounds from 2013 to 2019 alongside Liz Eagan, Karen Martini and Guy Grossi. He became a main series judge for the eleventh season in 2020, titled MKR: The Rivals alongside long running hosts/judges Manu Feildel and Pete Evans. Fassnidge returned as a judge in the Kitchen HQ cook off and final rounds for the twelfth season in 2022, alongside Curtis Stone and Gary Mehigan. In 2023, he again became a main judge and co-hosted alongside Feildel for the thirteenth season, with fellow returning judge Nigella Lawson appearing as a judge in the cook offs and finals.

In 2014, Fassnidge released his first cookbook, Four Kitchens (ISBN 9780857982346). His second cookbook, The Commonsense Cook (ISBN 9781760980153), was released in 2020.

In January 2021, Fassnidge appeared as a contestant on the seventh season I’m A Celebrity…Get Me Out Of Here! Australia. He was the tenth contestant to be eliminated, and placed fifth.

In March 2022, it was announced that Fassnidge is to host an Australian adaptation of Kitchen Nightmares on Channel 7.

In 2023 it was announced that he would become a guest speaker in Winetopia Auckland 2023, the first time since 2020 where the event had international speakers.

In January 2024, Seven Network announced that Fassnidge would be joining the home lifestyle program Better Homes and Gardens as a food presenter alongside Karen Martini after the departure of Ed Halmagyi.

In 2025, Fassnidge and Feildel started hosting a new cooking and travel series on the Seven Network titled Off The Grid, with Colin and Manu.

== Personal life ==
Fassnidge married Jane Hyland in 2006 after they met while working at the same restaurant. They have two daughters and live in Sydney.

In March 2026, Fassnidge pleaded guilty to driving with cocaine in his system for a second time. Magistrate Jacqueline Milledge placed him on a two-year good behaviour bond but did not record a conviction.

Fassnidge holds dual Irish and Australian citizenship.

== Television appearances ==
- My Kitchen Rules (2013–present)
- I’m A Celebrity…Get Me Out Of Here! (2021)
- Kitchen Nightmares (2022)
- Better Homes and Gardens (2024–present)
- Off The Grid, with Colin and Manu (2025–present)
