= Panna cotta =

Italian dessert of cream and gelatin

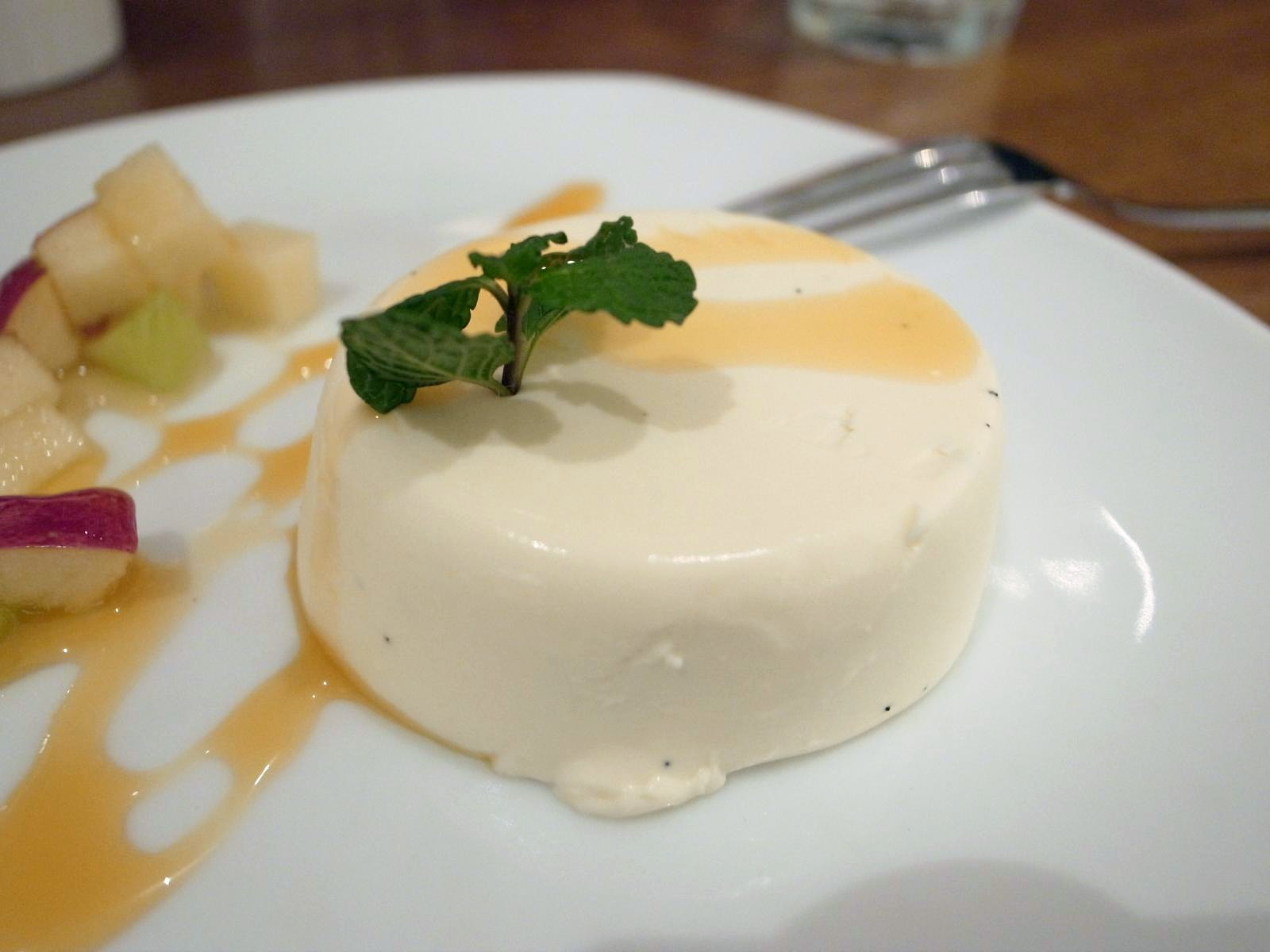
- Type: Pudding
- Place of origin: Italy
- Region or state: Piedmont
- Main ingredients: Cream, sugar, gelatin, vanilla

Panna cotta (Italian: [ˈpanna ˈkɔtta]; Piedmontese: panera cheuita, pronounced [paˈnera ˈkøjta]; lit. 'cooked cream') is an Italian dessert of sweetened cream thickened with gelatin and moulded. It may be flavoured with coffee, vanilla, or other flavours.

== History ==
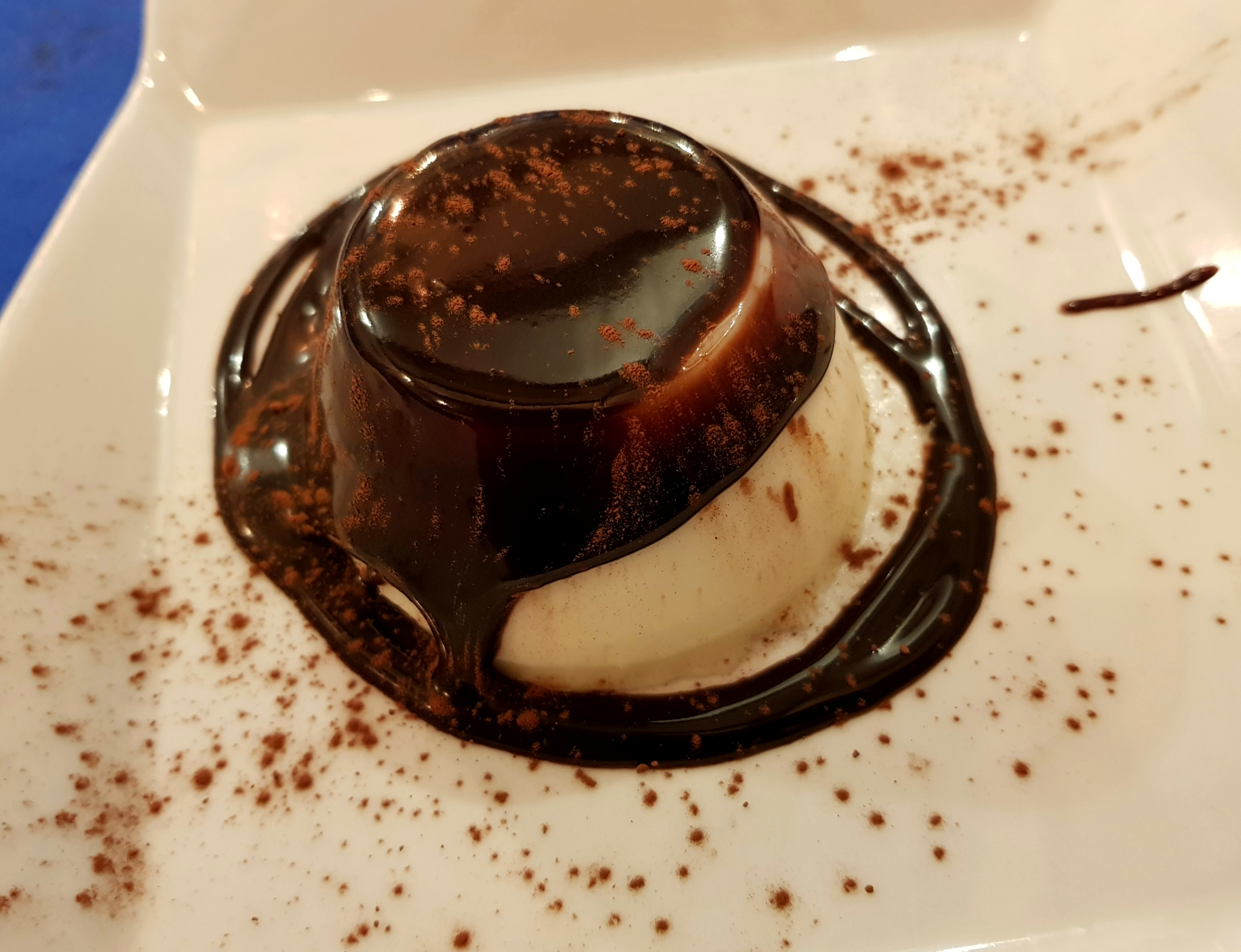
Panna cotta with chocolate

The name panna cotta is not mentioned in Italian cookbooks before the 1960s, yet it is often cited as a traditional dessert of the northern Italian region of Piedmont. One unverified story says that it was invented by a Hungarian woman in the Langhe in the early 19th century. An 1879 dictionary mentions a dish called latte inglese (lit. 'English milk'), made of cream cooked with gelatin and molded, although other sources say that latte inglese is made with egg yolks, such as crème anglaise; perhaps the name covered any thickened custard-like preparation.

The dish might also come from the French recipe of fromage bavarois from Marie-Antoine Carême in le pâtissier royal parisien, which is the same as the modern panna cotta, except that one part of the cream is whipped to make chantilly and included in the preparation before adding the gelatin.

The Piedmont region includes panna cotta in its 2001 list of traditional food products. Its recipe includes cream, milk, sugar, vanilla, gelatin, rum, and marsala poured into a mold with caramel. Another author considers the traditional flavoring to be peach eau de vie, and the traditional presentation not to have sauce or other garnishes.

Panna cotta became fashionable in the United States in the 1990s.

== Preparation ==
Sugar is dissolved in warm cream. The cream may be flavoured by infusing spices and the like in it or by adding rum, coffee, vanilla, and so on. Gelatin is dissolved in a cold liquid (usually water), then added to the warm cream mixture. This is poured into moulds and allowed to set. The moulds may have caramel in the bottoms, giving a result similar to a crème caramel. After it solidifies, the panna cotta is usually unmoulded onto a serving plate.

Although the name means 'cooked cream', the ingredients are only warm enough to dissolve the gelatin and sugar. Italian recipes sometimes call for colla di pesce ('fish glue'), which may literally be isinglass or, more probably, simply a name for common gelatin.

== Garnishes ==
Panna cotta is often served with a coulis of berries or a sauce of caramel or chocolate. It may be covered with other fruits or liqueurs.

== Related dishes ==
Bavarian cream is similar to panna cotta but usually includes eggs as well as gelatin and is mixed with whipped cream before setting.

Blancmange is sometimes thickened with gelatin or isinglass, and sometimes with cornstarch.

Panna cotta is sometimes called a custard, but true custard is thickened with egg yolks, not gelatin. A lighter version substitutes cream with Greek yogurt.

== See also ==
Media related to Panna cotta at Wikimedia Commons Panna Cotta with Red Fruit Sauce at the Wikibooks Cookbook subproject

- Piedmontese cuisine
- List of Italian desserts and pastries
