= Manu Feildel =

French-Australian chef, restaurateur and presenter

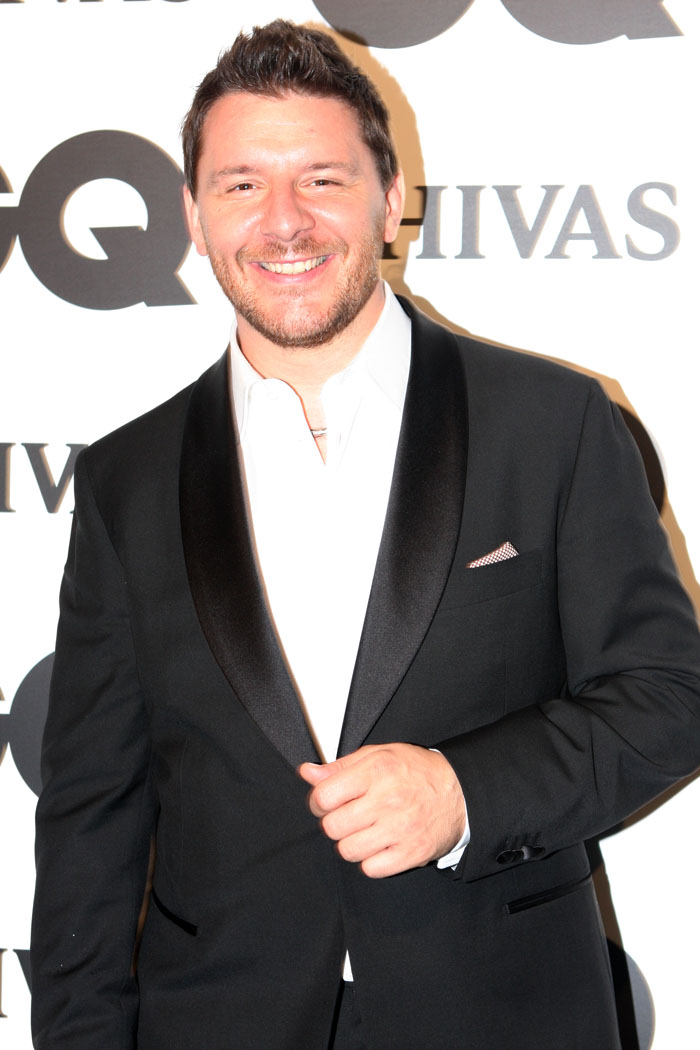
- Feidel in 2011
- Born: Emmanuel Feildel; 26 March 1974 (age 52); Nantes, France
- Citizenship: France; Australia
- Occupations: Chef; restaurateur; television presenter; clown
- Known for: My Kitchen Rules judge
- Spouse: Clarissa Weerasena (m. 2018)
- Children: 2

Emmanuel Feildel (born 26 March 1974) is a French-Australian chef, restaurateur and television presenter trained in England, who is best known as one of the judges of the competitive television cooking show My Kitchen Rules.

Feildel achieved a solid reputation as head chef at the restaurant Gilson's before moving to open his own restaurant, Manu at L'Étoile, in 2009. The restaurant closed in March 2014.

== Biography ==
In spite of a history of professional chefs in his family, including his father and a grandfather, Feildel decided to join a circus school at age 13 and learnt juggling, unicycling, clowning and some acrobatics. He stayed for three years and then decided that cooking was his first love and moved to London where he studied at the Cafe Royal restaurant. He then worked at Les Associes, the Cafe des Amis du Vin and popular seafood restaurant Livebait.

== Career ==
Feildel relocated to Australia in 1999, he worked at a number of restaurants for several years before opening the kitchen as head chef at Bilson's on invitation of its owner, offering contemporary French cuisine. According to The Sydney Morning Herald, he was a key factor in Bilson's "three-hat success". The Daily Telegraph indicates that it is for his service at this "exceptional fine diner" that he has fame among food lovers.

Feildel began appearing on Ready Steady Cook in 2006 and on MasterChef Australia in 2009 and has co-hosted My Kitchen Rules since 2010. Also in 2009, Feildel left Bilson's and opened his own French bistro, Manu at L'Étoile. However, the restaurant closed in March 2014, with Feildel citing a "nightmare year" with too much happening including his My Kitchen Rules commitments and increased competition that had hurt his business, meaning he could no longer afford to stay open.

In 2010, he was the celebrity contestant in the first episode of the short lived Australian version of Beat the Star.

Feildel won the 2011 series of Dancing with the Stars and appeared at the 2011 Good Food & Wine Show. He was also nominated for the Most Popular New Male Talent at the Logie Awards of 2011. He hosted the reality dating series Dinner Date in 2011.

Following the closure of his Sydney restaurant, Manu at L'Étoile, Feildel in partnership with chef George Calombaris opened a new restaurant Le Grand Cirque in Melbourne, which closed 4 months after opening, in August 2014.

In April 2014, Feildel hosted a two-part travel-cooking documentary entitled My France with Manu which follows Feildel travelling through western France, highlighting the local food, scenery and his memories of France. The show originally screened on the Seven Network.

A fictional parody of Feildel has appeared as a recurring character on the Aunty Donna podcast, where he is portrayed by Zachary Ruane.

Feildel appears in the 2018 film The BBQ as French chef, Andre Mont Blanc.

In 2019, Feildel became a judge on the revived version of Australia's Got Talent for the Seven Network. It was announced on 23 October 2019 that Feildel would join former MasterChef judges Gary Mehigan and Matt Preston in 2020 on a new cooking competition show called Plate of Origin.

== Community work ==
In March 2013, Feildel trekked the Kokoda Track to raise money for CanTeen, the Australian organisation for young people living with cancer. Each participant donated $5,000 to join the trek.

Feildel is also an ambassador for Camp Quality, a children's family cancer charity whose motto is "laughter is the best medicine".

=== ANZUP Cancer Trials Group ===
In 2019, Feildel took part in the ANZUP Cancer Trials Group's Rude Food campaign. He prepared a selection of "rude" looking dishes to raise awareness for "below the belt" (penile, prostate, testicular, bladder and kidney) cancers.

In 2020, Feildel joined ANZUP Cancer Trials Group as a Below the Belt Ambassador. He participated in the 2020 Below the Belt #YourWay Challenge in September 2020, completing 854 kilometres on his bicycle and raising $987 for cancer research.

In 2021, Feildel participated in Dancing with the Stars on Seven Network. He announced at the beginning of the season that his nominated charity was ANZUP Cancer Trials Group.

== Personal life ==
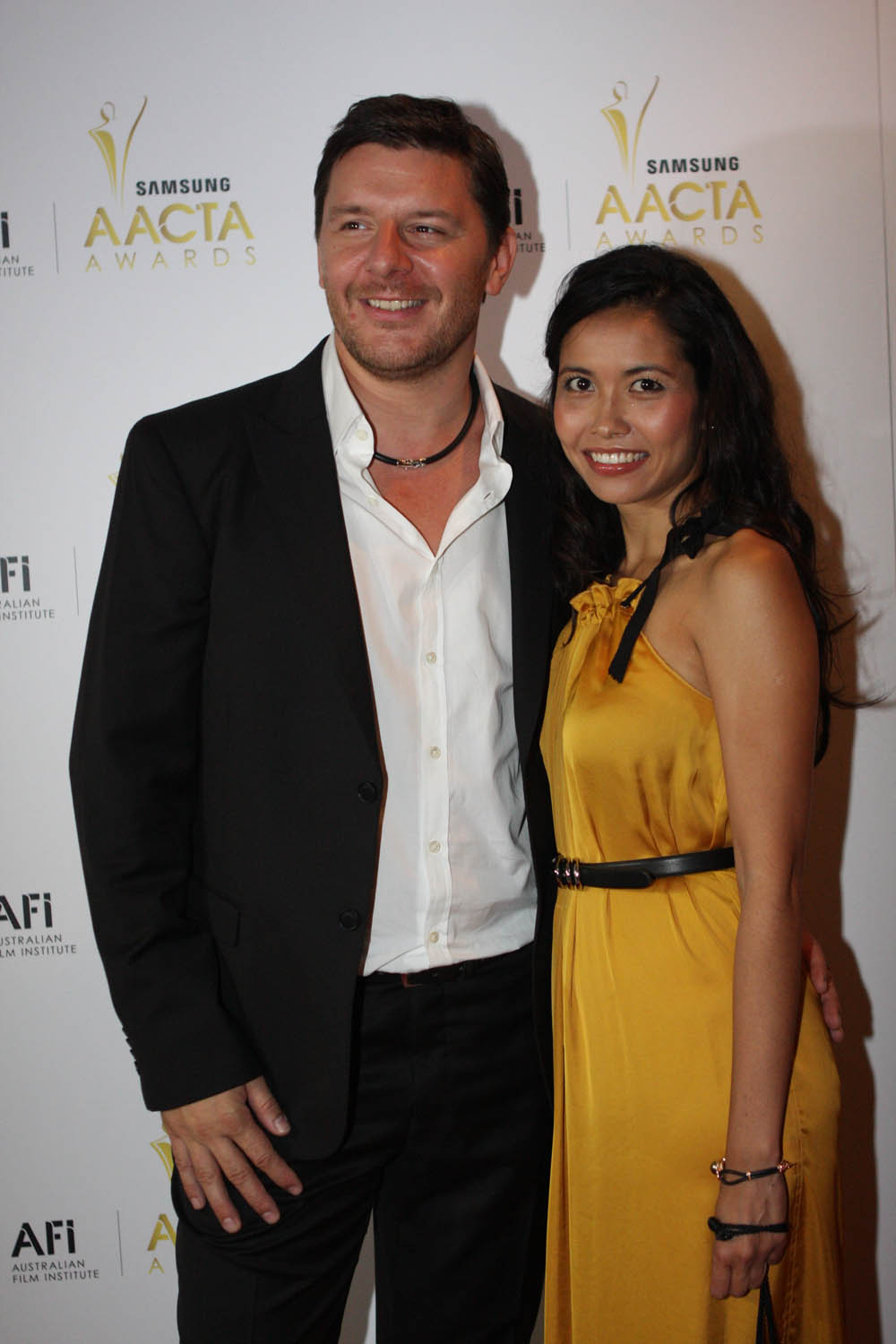
Feildel and his wife Clarissa Weerasena

Feildel holds dual French and Australian citizenship.

Feildel and his wife Veronica Anne "Ronnie" Morshead (b. Kingston, 1969) separated during 2009, after 12 years together. They have one son, Jonti, who plays Rugby League for the Glebe Dirty Reds, a Sydney Roosters feeder club.

Feildel became engaged to Pattaya go-go bar manager Clarissa Weerasena in November 2013, and they married in January 2018. The couple have a daughter, Charlee, born in 2015. Weerasena is a cook on Better Homes and Gardens.

== See also ==
- French Australians
