= My Kitchen Rules series 1 =

My Kitchen Rules
- Series 1
- No. of episodes: 15

Release
- Original network: Seven Network
- Original release: 1 February – 22 March 2010

Series chronology
- Next → Series 2 (2011)

The first season of the Australian competitive cooking competition show My Kitchen Rules premiered on the Seven Network on 1 February 2010.

== Teams ==
State		Group	Members	Relationship	Status
Queensland	QLD	2	Veronica and Shadi Abraham	Childhood Sweethearts	Winners 22 March (Grand Final)
Victoria	VIC	1	Clint Yudelman and Noah Rose	Best Mates	Runners-up 22 March (Grand Final)
New South Wales	NSW	1	Matthew and Gabe Moss	Cop and Lawyer	Eliminated 16 March (Semi-Final)
Queensland	QLD	1	Tanja Smith and Gen Latham	Sisters	Eliminated 16 March (Quarter-Final 3)
South Australia	SA	1	Paul Wood and Mel Heilmann	Flatmates	Eliminated 15 March (Quarter-Final 2)
Western Australia	WA	2	Holly Anderson and Grace McGurk	Best Friends	Eliminated 9 March (Quarter-Final 1)
South Australia	SA	2	Matt Michaelis and Melissa Edwards	Happily Divorced	Eliminated 8 March (Kitchen Cook-Off)
Victoria	VIC	2	Rowan Booth and Sophia Lindsay	Workmates	Eliminated 8 March (Kitchen Cook-Off)
New South Wales	NSW	2	Deb Szabo and Ben Sippel	Dating	Eliminated 2 March (Instant Restaurant: Round 2)
Western Australia	WA	1	Marc and Natalie Ferron	Teachers	Eliminated 15 February (Instant Restaurant: Round 1)

== Elimination history ==
Teams' Competition Progress
Round:		Instant Restaurants		Kitchen Cook-Off	Quarter-Finals			Semi-Final	Grand Final
Round:		1	2	Kitchen Cook-Off	1	2	3	Semi-Final	Grand Final
Teams:		Progress							
QLD	Veronica & Shadi	—	**1st** (70)	→	—	—	**1st** (45)	**1st** (36)	**Champions** (53)
VIC	Clint & Noah	**4th** (60)	—	**1st** (16)	—	**1st** (48)	—	**Immune**	**Runners-up** (49)
NSW	Matthew & Gabe	**2nd** (66)	—	→	**1st** (38)	—	—	**2nd** (33)	**Eliminated** (Episode 14)
QLD	Tanja & Gen	**3rd** (62)	—	**2nd** (15)	—	—	**2nd** (44)	**Eliminated** (Episode 14)	
Vic	Chaz & Stella	3rd (62)	-	3rd (14)	1st (40)	-	2nd (44)	Eliminated (Episode 13)	Eliminated (episode 13)
SA	Paul & Mel	**1st** (74)	—	→	—	**2nd** (21)	**Eliminated** (Episode 13)		
WA	Holly & Grace	—	**2nd** (66)	→	**2nd** (37)	**Eliminated** (Episode 12)			
SA	Matt & Melissa	—	**3rd** (56)	**3rd** (13)	**Eliminated** (Episode 11)				
VIC	Rowan & Sophia	—	**4th** (52)	**4th** (11)	**Eliminated** (Episode 11)				
NSW	Deb & Ben	—	**5th** (49)	**Eliminated** (Episode 10)					
WA	Marc & Natalie	**5th** (58)	**Eliminated** (Episode 5)						

Cell Descriptions
	Team won a challenge, People's Choice, cooked the best dish or received the highest score for the round.
	Team proceeded straight through to the Grand Final.
	Team lost a challenge, cooked the weakest dish or received a low score and must compete in an additional round or challenge.
Safe	Team was safe from elimination after passing a challenge. (If applicable, team was safe after the challenge listed in bold); **PC** = People's Choice, **HQ** = Kitchen Headquarters challenge, **SD** = Sudden Death
→	Team advanced to next round.
**SD**	Team competed in a Sudden Death Cook-Off and became safe from elimination.
**SD**	Team was eliminated after losing in a Sudden Death Cook-Off or round.
**Immune**	From winning the previous challenge, the team was immune from elimination and was not required to participate.
—	Results do not apply as the team was not allocated to this challenge or round.

== Competition details ==
=== Instant Restaurants ===
During the Instant Restaurant rounds, each team hosts a three-course dinner for judges and fellow teams in their allocated group. They are scored and ranked among their group, with the lowest scoring team being eliminated.

==== Round 1 ====
- Episodes 1 to 5
- Airdate – 1 to 15 February
- Description – The first of the two instant restaurant groups are introduced into the competition in Round 1. The lowest scoring team at the end of this round is eliminated.

Instant Restaurant Summary
Group 1
Team and Episode Details		Guest Scores					Pete's Scores			Manu's Scores			Total (out of 100)	Rank	Result
Team and Episode Details		M&G	C&N	T&G	M&N	P&M	Entrée	Main	Dessert	Entrée	Main	Dessert	Total (out of 100)	Rank	Result
NSW	Matthew & Gabe	—	5	6	5	6	7	7	7	8	7	8	66	2nd	Safe
Ep 1	1 February	Monterey Cottage													Safe
Dishes	Entrée	Turmeric Crusted Barramundi with Wild Rocket and Tzatziki													Safe
Dishes	Main	Rib Eye Fillet with Mustard Kipfler Mash, Beans and Red Wine Port Onion Jus													Safe
Dishes	Dessert	Baked Lime Cheesecake with Fresh Cream and a Lime Cheek													Safe
VIC	Clint & Noah	5	—	6	6	7	6	2	10	6	3	9	60	4th	Through to Kitchen Cook-Off
Ep 2	2 February	My Cousin Pescatore													Through to Kitchen Cook-Off
Dishes	Entrée	Lobster Risotto with Shaved Asparagus, Vanilla and Truffle													Through to Kitchen Cook-Off
Dishes	Main	Trout Ravioli with White Wine, Cream & Zucchini Sauce													Through to Kitchen Cook-Off
Dishes	Dessert	Baked Chocolate Mousse Cake with Crème Fraiche and Cinnamon Poached Pear													Through to Kitchen Cook-Off
QLD	Tanja & Gen	6	5	—	6	7	9	3	7	8	4	7	62	3rd	Through to Kitchen Cook-Off
Ep 3	8 February	Bay Bliss													Through to Kitchen Cook-Off
Dishes	Entrée	Stradbroke Island Oysters, Bay Scallops, Prawn Wontons and Moreton Bay Mud Crab													Through to Kitchen Cook-Off
Dishes	Main	Lemon Myrtle Lamb Backstrap with Rice Pilaf, Roasted Tomatoes and Minted Pea Salad													Through to Kitchen Cook-Off
Dishes	Dessert	Vanilla Panna Cotta with Champagne Strawberries, Sabayon and Summer Berry Fruit Salad													Through to Kitchen Cook-Off
WA	Marc & Natalie	6	5	6	—	8	9	5	3	8	5	3	58	5th	Eliminated
Ep 4	9 February	Luminant													Eliminated
Dishes	Entrée	Twice Baked Gorgonzola Soufflè with Caramelised Pear and Vermouth Fondue													Eliminated
Dishes	Main	Confit Duck Breast with Spiced Couscous, Wilted Greens and Sour Cherry & Star Anise Sauce													Eliminated
Dishes	Dessert	Kulfi Brûlée with Pistachio and White Chocolate Macaroon													Eliminated
SA	Paul & Mel	7	6	8	7	—	7	9	7	7	8	8	74	1st	Safe
Ep 5	15 February	Left of Centre													Safe
Dishes	Entrée	Pancetta and Broad Bean Risotto													Safe
Dishes	Main	Venison Loin Fanned Over a Field Mushroom with Bacon Strips and Bloody Mary Sauce													Safe
Dishes	Dessert	Cherry Consommé, Raspberry Truffle, Blackberry Meringue and Strawberry & Fig Martini													Safe

==== Round 2 ====
- Episodes 6 to 10
- Airdate – 16 February to 2 March
- Description – The second group now start their Instant Restaurant round. The same rules from the previous round apply and the lowest scoring team is eliminated.

Instant Restaurant Summary
Group 2
Team and Episode Details		Guest Scores					Pete's Scores			Manu's Scores			Total (out of 100)	Rank	Result
Team and Episode Details		D&B	V&S	R&S	H&G	M&M	Entrée	Main	Dessert	Entrée	Main	Dessert	Total (out of 100)	Rank	Result
NSW	Deb & Ben	—	7	4	5	5	3	4	7	4	3	7	49	5th	Eliminated
Ep 6	16 February	Earth, Fire, Stars													Eliminated
Dishes	Entrée	Smoked Trout, Labne and Lime Timbale													Eliminated
Dishes	Main	Saltbush Lamb with Fondant Potatoes, Asparagus and Beans													Eliminated
Dishes	Dessert	Wattleseed Crème Caramel with Double Cream													Eliminated
QLD	Veronica & Shadi	7	—	7	8	7	9	8	4	10	7	3	70	1st	Safe
Ep 7	22 February	Cucina Arabella													Safe
Dishes	Entrée	Garlic Chilli Tiger Prawns with Sicilian Orange and Fennel Stack													Safe
Dishes	Main	Pan Fried Snapper with Tahini Sauce, Fattoush and Labne													Safe
Dishes	Dessert	Chocolate and Ricotta Filled Dumplings with Ginger-Infused Apple Sauce													Safe
VIC	Rowan & Sophia	6	5	—	7	7	3	7	3	3	8	3	52	4th	Through to Kitchen Cook-Off
Ep 8	23 February	Munthari													Through to Kitchen Cook-Off
Dishes	Entrée	Pan Fried Cod with Desert Lime Sauce and Rocket & Spinach Salad													Through to Kitchen Cook-Off
Dishes	Main	Crispy Skin Pigeon with Spicy Honey Glaze, Taro Mash and Greens													Through to Kitchen Cook-Off
Dishes	Dessert	Macadamia & Quandong Tart with Gippsland Cream													Through to Kitchen Cook-Off
WA	Holly & Grace	6	6	7	—	7	4	7	9	5	7	8	66	2nd	Safe
Ep 9	1 March	Hot Summer Nights													Safe
Dishes	Entrée	Strawberry Salad with Prosciutto, Grilled Halloumi and Balsamic Glaze													Safe
Dishes	Main	Duck Ragout with Fresh Pappardelle Pasta													Safe
Dishes	Dessert	Coconut Panna Cotta with Mango and Palm Sugar Caramel													Safe
SA	Matt & Melissa	4	5	5	6	—	4	5	9	4	5	9	56	3rd	Through to Kitchen Cook-Off
Ep 10	2 March	East Garden													Through to Kitchen Cook-Off
Dishes	Entrée	Yabbie Tails with Leek in Ravioli with Bisque													Through to Kitchen Cook-Off
Dishes	Main	Hunter's Rabbit with Gypsy Speck and Roasted Vegetables													Through to Kitchen Cook-Off
Dishes	Dessert	Poached Pear with Ice-Cream and Hazelnut Praline													Through to Kitchen Cook-Off

=== Kitchen Cook-Off ===
- Episode 11
- Airdate – 8 March
- Description – The 3rd and 4th ranked teams from each instant restaurant round competed against one another in a Kitchen Cook-Off, cooking a signature dish. Pete and Manu scored each dish, and the two lowest scoring teams were eliminated.

Kitchen Cook-Off Summary
Kitchen Cook-Off
Team		Pete's Scores	Manu's Scores	Total (out of 20)	Rank	Result
VIC	Clint & Noah	8	8	16	1st	Safe
Dish		Lamb Backstrap in Filo with Pea & Mint Puree and Potato & Mushroom Cake				Safe
QLD	Tanja & Gen	8	7	15	2nd	Safe
Dish		Lamb Kofta with Couscous Salad and Ratatouille Stack				Safe
SA	Matt & Melissa	7	6	13	3rd	Eliminated
Dish		Lamb Noisettes with Sugar Snap Peas, Snow Pea Tendrils, Baby Carrots and Roasted Potatoes				Eliminated
VIC	Rowan & Sophia	6	5	11	4th	Eliminated
Dish		Rack of Lamb with Croquettes, Spinach, Mushrooms, Lemon Myrtle Aioli and Rocket Mayonnaise				Eliminated

=== Quarter-finals ===
==== Round 1 ====
- Episode 12
- Airdate – 9 March
- Description – Matthew & Gabe and Holly & Grace competed against each other in the first Quarter Final. The lower scoring team is eliminated and the winning team advances through to the Semi-Finals.

Quarter-Final Cook-Off Results
Quarter-Final 1
Team		Judge's Scores						Total (out of 60)	Result
Team		Karen	Guy	Jacqui	Tobie	Pete	Manu	Total (out of 60)	Result
NSW	Matthew & Gabe	5	7	7	7	6	6	38	Safe
Dishes	Entrée	Masterstock Pork Belly with Asian Greens							Safe
Dishes	Main	Chicken Thighs in Prosciutto with Napolitana Sauce							Safe
Dishes	Dessert	Coconut Pie with Mango Coulis							Safe
WA	Holly & Grace	6	6	6	6	6	7	37	Eliminated
Dishes	Entrée	Fresh Beetroot & Goat's Curd Stack							Eliminated
Dishes	Main	Porcini Risotto with Sautéed Mushrooms							Eliminated
Dishes	Dessert	Vanilla Bean Meringue with Rhubarb & Berry Compote							Eliminated

==== Round 2 ====
- Episode 13
- Airdate – 15 March
- Description – Clint & Noah and Paul & Mel competed against each other in the second Quarter Final, with the lower scoring team being eliminated. As Clint & Noah received the highest score overall, they proceeded straight through to the Grand Final.

Quarter-Final Cook-Off Results
Quarter-Final 2
Team		Judge's Scores						Total (out of 60)	Result
Team		Karen	Guy	Jacqui	Tobie	Pete	Manu	Total (out of 60)	Result
VIC	Clint & Noah	8	8	8	8	8	8	48	Through to Grand Final
Dishes	Entrée	Pan Seared Scallops on Cauliflower Purée							Through to Grand Final
Dishes	Main	Blue Eye Trevalla with Harissa Crust and Tabouli Salad							Through to Grand Final
Dishes	Dessert	Middle-Eastern Cigars with Cardamom Ice Cream							Through to Grand Final
SA	Paul & Mel	3	3	4	4	4	3	21	Eliminated
Dishes	Entrée	Beetroot Gnocchi with Blue Cheese							Eliminated
Dishes	Main	Pepperberry Kangaroo with Strawberry Sauce							Eliminated
Dishes	Dessert	Sticky Date Pudding with Summer Fruit							Eliminated

==== Round 3 ====
- Episode 14
- Airdate – 16 March
- Description – Veronica & Shadi and Tanja & Gen competed against each other in the third Quarter Final. The lower scoring team is eliminated and the winning team advances through to the Semi-Finals.

Quarter-Final Cook-Off Results
Quarter-Final 3
Team		Judge's Scores						Total (out of 60)	Result
Team		Karen	Guy	Jacqui	Tobie	Pete	Manu	Total (out of 60)	Result
QLD	Veronica & Shadi	8	8	7	8	7	7	45	Safe
Dishes	Entrée	Eggplant Parmigiana with Panko Crumb Garnish and Balsamic Glaze							Safe
Dishes	Main	Sicilian Sausages with Leek Mash, Tomatoes and Radicchio Salad							Safe
Dishes	Dessert	Lemon & Almond Tortina with Caramelised Figs and Citrus Mascarpone							Safe
QLD	Tanja & Gen	7	8	6	8	8	7	44	Eliminated
Dishes	Entrée	Leek & Gruyere Tart with Onion Jam and Fig & Rocket Salad							Eliminated
Dishes	Main	Limoncello Chicken with Zucchini Spaghetti and Roasted Vegetables							Eliminated
Dishes	Dessert	Jaffa Friand with Chocolate Ganache, Chantilly Cream and Orange Salad							Eliminated

=== Semi-final ===
- Episode 14
- Airdate – 16 March
- Description – Veronica & Shadi and Matthew & Gabe competed against each other, cooking a signature dish worthy of the last spot in the Grand Final. The winner proceeds through to the Grand Final and the lower scoring team is eliminated.

Semi-Final Cook-Off Results
Semi-Final 1
Team		Judge's Scores						Total (out of 60)	Result
Team		Karen	Guy	Jacqui	Tobie	Pete	Manu	Total (out of 60)	Result
QLD	Veronica & Shadi	6	6	6	6	6	6	36	Through to Grand Final
Dish		Handmade Pasta with Pancetta, Silverbeet, Ricotta and Goat's Curd							Through to Grand Final
NSW	Matthew & Gabe	5	5	6	5	6	6	33	Eliminated
Dish		Ocean Trout Confit with Green Vegetable Slaw, Chive Oil and Hollandaise Sauce							Eliminated

=== Grand Final ===
- Episode 15
- Airdate – 22 March
- Description – The top two teams face off in the Grand Final. Each team cooks a three course meal served to eliminated teams, friends and family. The guest judges return for the final verdict of awarding the $100,000 prize to the winners. The teams also wear proper chef attire and have their Instant Restaurant represented.

Grand Final Results
Grand Final
Team		Judge's Scores						Total (out of 60)	Result
Team		Karen	Guy	Jacqui	Tobie	Pete	Manu	Total (out of 60)	Result
QLD	Veronica & Shadi	9	9	9	8	9	9	53	Champions
Dishes		Cucina Arrabella							Champions
Entrée		Squid with Rocket and Garlic Aioli							Champions
Main		Swordfish with Eggplant and Anchovies							Champions
Dessert		Orange Blossom Custard with Kataifi Pastry							Champions
VIC	Clint & Noah	8	9	8	8	8	8	49	Runners-up
Dishes		My Cousin Pescatore							Runners-up
Entrée		Tuna Carpaccio with Fennel Salad							Runners-up
Main		Duck à l'Orange with Red Cabbage							Runners-up
Dessert		Raspberry Tart with Crème Patissiere							Runners-up

== Ratings ==
Colour Key:
– Highest Rating
– Lowest Rating
– Elimination Episode
– Finals Week

Week	Episode		Airdate	Viewers (in millions)	Nightly Rank	Source
1	1	Instant Restaurant 1-1: Mossy & Gabe	Monday, 1 February	1.103	#9	
1	2	Instant Restaurant 1-2: Clint & Noah	Tuesday, 2 February	1.182	#5	
2	3	Instant Restaurant 1-3: Tanja & Gen	Monday, 8 February	1.328	#4	
2	4	Instant Restaurant 1-4: Marc & Natalie	Tuesday, 9 February	1.107	#8	
3	5	Instant Restaurant 1-5: Paul & Mel	Monday, 15 February	1.471	#1	
3	6	Instant Restaurant 2-1: Deb & Ben	Tuesday, 16 February	1.214	#7	
4	7	Instant Restaurant 2-2: Veronica & Shadi	Sunday, 22 February	1.194	#6	
4	8	Instant Restaurant 2-3: Rowan & Sophia	Monday, 23 February	1.355	#3	
5	9	Instant Restaurant 2-4: Holly & Grace	Monday, 1 March	1.408	#3	
5	10	Instant Restaurant 2-5: Matt & Melissa	Tuesday, 2 March	1.400	#2	
6	11	Kitchen Cook-Off	Monday, 8 March	1.396	#5	
6	12	Quarter-Final 1	Tuesday, 9 March	1.462	#2	
7	13	Quarter-Final 2	Monday, 15 March	1.355	#4	
7	14	Quarter-Final 3 & Semi-Final	Tuesday, 16 March	1.563	#1	
8	15	Grand Final	Monday, 22 March	1.525	#1	
