= My Kitchen Rules series 3 =

My Kitchen Rules
- Series 3
- No. of episodes: 37

Release
- Original network: Seven Network
- Original release: 30 January – 27 March 2012

Series chronology
- ← Previous; Series 2 (2011) Next → Series 4 (2013)

The third series of My Kitchen Rules was an Australian reality television cooking programme which aired on the Seven Network.

Following the ratings success of the second series, the Seven Network announced the show was renewed for a third season. The third season of My Kitchen Rules started on 30 January 2012. For the first time, a team from New Zealand took part in the show.

== Game variations ==
- This season, there would be twelve teams, two teams from Queensland, New South Wales, Victoria, South Australia, and Western Australia. Only one team from Tasmania (last season had two), and one from New Zealand (show's first).
- Instant Restaurant Elimination Round - the three lowest scoring teams from each group would take part in this round and the lowest scoring team would be eliminated (similar to the first season).
- The prize money for this season and all future seasons increased to AU$250,000.

== Teams ==
State/Country		Group	Members	Relationship	Status
South Australia	SA	1	Leigh Sexton & Jennifer Evans	Florist & 'Princess'	Winners 27 March 2012 (Grand Final)
South Australia	SA	2	Nic Mazzone & Rocco La Bella	Childhood Friends	Runners-up 27 March 2012 (Grand Final)
Victoria	VIC	2	Carly & Emily Cheung	Sisters	Eliminated 26 March 2012 (Semifinals 2)
Tasmania	TAS	2	Megan Woodman & Andy Appleby	Sales Reps	Eliminated 25 March 2012 (Semifinals 1)
New South Wales	NSW	1	Steve Georgiou & Helen Demetriou	Siblings	Eliminated 21 March 2012 (Elimination Week, Top 5)
Queensland	QLD	1	David Hopgood & Scott Bradshaw	Soldier Mates	Eliminated 20 March 2012 (Elimination Week, Top 6)
Western Australia	WA	1	Angela Schlegel & Justine Matchitt	Teacher & Truckie	Eliminated 19 March 2012 (Elimination Week, Top 7)
New Zealand	NZ	1	Simon Yandall & Meg Dangen	Kiwis	Eliminated 18 March 2012 (Top 8)
Victoria	VIC	1	Thomas Carr & Carla Mangion	Just Friends	Eliminated 13 March 2012 (Top 9)
Queensland	QLD	2	Peter Hamilton & Gary Rogers	Lawyer & Doctor	Eliminated 8 March 2012 (Top 10)
New South Wales	NSW	2	Sam Bui & Jillian Beilby	Potential In-Laws	Eliminated 5 March 2012 (Top 11)
Western Australia	WA	2	Emma Donnelly & Andrew Paton	Engaged Scientists	Eliminated 28 February 2012 (Instant Restaurant: Round 3)

== Elimination history ==
Results per team
Round:	Instant Restaurants			Top 11	Top 10	Top 9	Top 8	Elimination Week			Semi-Finals		Grand Finale
Round:	1	2	3	Top 11	Top 10	Top 9	Top 8	1	2	3	1	2	Grand Finale
Team	Result												
Leigh & Jennifer	2nd (76)	—N/a	—N/a	HQ; Safe	HQ; Safe	HQ; Safe	HQ; Safe	Safe	SD (52)	Safe	1st (52)	—N/a	Champions (58)
Nic & Rocco	—N/a	1st (95)	—N/a	HQ; Safe	HQ; Safe	Safe^{1}	HQ; Safe	Safe	Safe	Safe	—N/a	1st (44)	Runners-up (52)
Carly & Emily	—N/a	2nd (69)	—N/a	People's; Choice	SD (51)	HQ; Safe	HQ; Safe	Safe	Safe	Safe	—N/a	2nd (43)	Eliminated (Episode 36)
Megan & Andy	—N/a	6th (56)	2nd (75)	HQ; Safe	HQ; Safe	SD (41)	People's; Choice	SD (57)	Safe	SD (50)	2nd (46)	Eliminated (Episode 35)	
Steve & Helen	3rd (75)	—N/a	—N/a	HQ; Safe	People's; Choice	HQ; Safe	SD (38)	Safe	Safe	SD (36)	Eliminated (Episode 33)		
David & Scott	4th (64)	—N/a	4th (56)	HQ; Safe	HQ; Safe	People's; Choice	HQ; Safe	Safe	SD (49)	Eliminated (Episode 32)			
Angela & Justine	1st (78)	—N/a	—N/a	HQ; Safe	HQ; Safe	HQ; Safe	HQ; Safe	SD (47)	Eliminated (Episode 31)				
Simon & Meg	5th (58)	—N/a	1st (77)	Immune	HQ; Safe	HQ; Safe	SD (37)	Eliminated (Episode 30)					
Thomas & Carla	6th (46)	—N/a	5th (49)	SD (39)	HQ; Safe	SD (32)	Eliminated (Episode 27)						
Peter & Gary	—N/a	4th (63)	3rd (69)	HQ; Safe	SD (17)	Eliminated (Episode 24)							
Sam & Jillian	—N/a	3rd (65)	—N/a	SD (32)	Eliminated (Episode 21)								
Emma & Andrew	—N/a	5th (62)	6th (42)	Eliminated (Episode 18)									

Cell Descriptions
	Team won a challenge, People's Choice, cooked the best dish or received the highest score for the round.
	Team must compete in an additional instant restaurant round
Safe	Team was safe after the showdown or Sudden Death Cook-off
	Team was eliminated after round or lost the Sudden death cook-off
—N/a	Results do not apply as the team was not allocated to this challenge or round.

Note:

- ^1– In Round 3 after winning the peoples choice, David & Scott won immunity for the rest of the week and a holiday in Far North Queensland, Pete & Manu stated that they could pick one team to join them on the holiday, also granting that team immunity, they chose Nic & Rocco.

== Competition details ==
=== Instant Restaurants ===
In the Instant Restaurant rounds, each team prepares a three-course dinner for the judges and the other teams in their group. The teams are scored and ranked within the group. After the first group of six teams had competed, the three lowest-scoring teams were placed in an elimination round. Following the second group of six teams, the lowest-scoring teams also advanced to the elimination stage, where they competed in another Instant Restaurant round. After all six teams had been assessed, the lowest-scoring team was eliminated from the competition.

==== Round 1 ====
- Episodes 1 to 6
- Airdate — 30 January to 7 February
- Description — The first of the two instant restaurant groups are introduced into the competition in Round 1. The three lowest scoring teams at the end of this round go into the elimination round.

Instant Restaurant Summary
Group 1
Team and Episode Details		Guest Scores						Pete's Scores			Manu's Scores			Total (out of 110)	Rank	Result
Team and Episode Details		S&H	A&J	L&J	S&M	D&S	T&C	Entrée	Main	Dessert	Entrée	Main	Dessert	Total (out of 110)	Rank	Result
NSW	Steve & Helen	—	7	6	7	7	7	7	5	8	8	5	8	75	3rd	Safe
Ep 1	30 January	Glendi														Safe
Dishes	Entrée	Saganaki Prawns with Tomato, Feta and Homemade Bread														Safe
Dishes	Main	Steve and Helen’s Open Style Moussaka with Greek Salad														Safe
Dishes	Dessert	Cypriot Pancake with Vanilla Ice Cream														Safe
WA	Angela & Justine	7	—	7	8	6	6	7	7	8	7	6	9	78	1st	Safe
Ep 2	31 January	The Garden of Eden														Safe
Dishes	Entrée	Warm Duck Salad with Beetroot, Pomegranate and Redcurrant Vinaigrette														Safe
Dishes	Main	Pork Chops with Prosciutto, Apple, Gorgonzola and Pea and Asparagus Risotto														Safe
Dishes	Dessert	Chocolate Brownie and Mixed Berry Nougat Semifreddo with Berry Coulis														Safe
SA	Leigh & Jennifer	7	6	—	7	7	7	9	9	3	9	8	4	76	2nd	Safe
Ep 3	1 February	Burlesque														Safe
Dishes	Entrée	Fish Floss with Green Mango and Pork Belly Salad														Safe
Dishes	Main	Crispy Skin Mulloway with Micro Herbs, Daikon Salad and Chilli Tamarind Sauce														Safe
Dishes	Dessert	Custard Pandan Chiffon with Sago and Passionfruit Mousse														Safe
NZ	Simon & Meg	6	4	5	—	7	4	8	6	2	8	5	3	58	5th	Through to Round 3
Ep 4	2 February	The Kiwi Kitchen														Through to Round 3
Dishes	Entrée	Pan Seared Scallops with Broccoli Ginger Purée and Lemon Beurre Blanc														Through to Round 3
Dishes	Main	New Zealand Rack of Lamb with Kumara Purée, Asparagus, Tomatoes and Port Plum Jus														Through to Round 3
Dishes	Dessert	Mini Pavlovas with Pastry Cream, Strawberries and Kiwifruit														Through to Round 3
QLD	David & Scott	5	5	6	5	—	6	4	5	9	5	4	10	64	4th	Through to Round 3
Ep 5	6 February	The Diggers Rest														Through to Round 3
Dishes	Entrée	Red Claw Salad with Coriander Blini and Mint, Lychee and Kiwifruit Salsa														Through to Round 3
Dishes	Main	Beef Fillet and Moreton Bay Bug with Sweet Potato Cake, Broccolini and Bearnaise Sauce														Through to Round 3
Dishes	Dessert	Mango and Macadamia Flan with Vanilla Cream, Toffee Shards and Mango Coulis														Through to Round 3
VIC	Thomas & Carla	4	4	4	4	4	—	8	4	1	9	3	1	46	6th	Through to Round 3
Ep 6	7 February	Grazed														Through to Round 3
Dishes	Entrée	Wheat Beer and Mussel Soup														Through to Round 3
Dishes	Main	Lamb Kofte with Baba Ganoush, Pistachio Tabbouleh and Homemade Roti														Through to Round 3
Dishes	Dessert	Miniature Lavender and Blueberry Cheesecake with Honeycomb														Through to Round 3

==== Round 2 ====
- Episodes 7 to 12
- Airdate — 8 to 16 February
- Description — The second group now start their Instant Restaurant round. The same rules from the previous round apply and the three lowest scoring teams go into the elimination round.

Instant Restaurant Summary
Group 2
Team and Episode Details		Guest Scores						Pete's Scores			Manu's Scores			Total (out of 110)	Rank	Result
Team and Episode Details		S&J	E&A	N&R	M&A	P&G	C&E	Entrée	Main	Dessert	Entrée	Main	Dessert	Total (out of 110)	Rank	Result
NSW	Sam & Jillian	—	5	6	5	6	6	5	4	9	5	5	9	65	3rd	Safe
Ep 7	8 February	Food Republic														Safe
Dishes	Entrée	Pea Soup with Parmesan Pillows														Safe
Dishes	Main	Sesame Encrusted Tuna with Pan Fried Potato, Ginger & Garlic Aioli, Asparagus & Jamon Crumbs														Safe
Dishes	Dessert	Earl Grey Tea Bombe Alaska with a Fiery Twist														Safe
WA	Emma & Andrew	5	—	6	6	6	7	6	7	2	7	6	4	62	5th	Through to Round 3
Ep 8	9 February	Obscura														Through to Round 3
Dishes	Entrée	Baked Marron in Citrus Sauce with Orange and Truffle Salad														Through to Round 3
Dishes	Main	Venison and Beer Pie with Relish, Mash and Baby Carrots														Through to Round 3
Dishes	Dessert	Fig Galettes with Maple and Macadamia Liquid Nitrogen Ice Cream														Through to Round 3
SA	Nic & Rocco	9	9	—	8	8	9	8	8	10	8	8	10	95	1st	Safe
Ep 9	13 February	Double Trouble														Safe
Dishes	Entrée	Potato String Prawns with Lime Mayonnaise, Sashimi Tuna on Seaweed, Scallop and Chorizo Stack with Avocado and Salsa Fresca														Safe
Dishes	Main	Nic and Rocco's Signature Roast with Rosti, Chilli Spiked Broccoli and Brandy Jus														Safe
Dishes	Dessert	Gateau Opera with Gold Leaf and Affogato														Safe
TAS	Megan & Andy	4	6	6	—	5	5	7	4	4	7	5	3	56	6th	Through to Round 3
Ep 10	14 February	Baggy Green														Through to Round 3
Dishes	Entrée	Crispy Skin Rainbow Trout with Ruby Red Grapefruit Salad														Through to Round 3
Dishes	Main	Wild Rabbit, Chorizo & Mushroom Ragout with World Cup Vegetable Stack and Baby Potatoes														Through to Round 3
Dishes	Dessert	Apple Tarte Tatin with Homemade Vanilla Bean Ice Cream														Through to Round 3
QLD	Peter & Gary	4	5	6	4	—	5	9	6	4	9	6	5	63	4th	Through to Round 3
Ep 11	15 February	La Côte d'Or														Through to Round 3
Dishes	Entrée	Gruyere and Tomato Tarts														Through to Round 3
Dishes	Main	Beef Fillet en Feuilletons and Duxelles with Potato Gratin, Green Beans and Port Jus														Through to Round 3
Dishes	Dessert	Poached Pears Suterne with Two Sauces														Through to Round 3
VIC	Carly & Emily	6	7	8	6	6	—	5	3	9	7	4	8	69	2nd	Safe
Ep 12	16 February	Harvest Moon														Safe
Dishes	Entrée	Pork and Prawn Bean Curd Rolls in Oyster Sauce														Safe
Dishes	Main	Tea Smoked Quail with Pork Fried Snake Beans and Steamed Rice														Safe
Dishes	Dessert	Steamed Malay Cake with Ginger Mascarpone Cream and Ginger Syrup														Safe

==== Round 3 ====
- Episodes 13 to 18
- Airdate — 20 February to 28 February
- Description — The bottom three teams from each instant restaurant group compete against each other in Round 3. The lowest scoring team at the end of this round is eliminated.

Instant Restaurant Summary
Group 3
Team and Episode Details		Guest Scores						Pete's Scores			Manu's Scores			Total (out of 110)	Rank	Result
Team and Episode Details		T&C	S&M	M&A	E&A	D&S	P&G	Entrée	Main	Dessert	Entrée	Main	Dessert	Total (out of 110)	Rank	Result
VIC	Thomas & Carla	—	4	3	4	4	4	5	2	6	5	3	9	49	5th	Safe
Ep 13	20 February	Grazed														Safe
Dishes	Entrée	Asparagus, Leek and Tarragon Soup with a Poached Egg														Safe
Dishes	Main	Fig and Pistachio Crusted Lamb Leg with Beetroot, Parsnip & Goat's Cheese Roulade and Homemade Bread														Safe
Dishes	Dessert	Lemon and Lime Tartlet with a Passionfruit Coulis														Safe
NZ	Simon & Meg	5	—	7	7	8	6	8	7	8	7	7	7	77	1st	Safe
Ep 14	21 February	The Kiwi Kitchen														Safe
Dishes	Entrée	Whitebait Fritters with Watercress and Horseradish Cream														Safe
Dishes	Main	Pan Seared Snapper with Creamy Chowder Sauce on Carrot and Leek Confit														Safe
Dishes	Dessert	Feijoa and Apple Crumble with Vanilla Ice Cream and Maple Syrup														Safe
TAS	Megan & Andy	7	6	—	6	7	6	9	9	4	8	8	5	75	2nd	Safe
Ep 15	22 February	Baggy Green														Safe
Dishes	Entrée	Seared Scallops on Pork Crackling with Salmon Roe														Safe
Dishes	Main	Bouillabaisse with Rouille and Croutons														Safe
Dishes	Dessert	Sticky Date Cheesecake with Caramel Fudge Sauce														Safe
WA	Emma & Andrew	1	4	5	—	4	3	5	2	4	7	3	4	42	6th	Eliminated
Ep 16	23 February	Obscura														Eliminated
Dishes	Entrée	Vietnamese Chicken and Prawn Salad with Vermicelli and Sugar Peanuts														Eliminated
Dishes	Main	Twice Cooked Duck with Pork and Prawn Wonton Soup														Eliminated
Dishes	Dessert	Coconut Rice with Tropical Salsa, Toasted Macadamias and Coconut														Eliminated
QLD	David & Scott	5	6	6	3	—	4	9	6	1	8	6	2	56	4th	Safe
Ep 17	27 February	The Diggers Rest														Safe
Dishes	Entrée	Thai Noodle Rolls with Prawn and Tofu Filling and Sweet Chilli Sauce														Safe
Dishes	Main	Thai Lamb Green Curry with Rice														Safe
Dishes	Dessert	Coconut Parfait with a Ginger Brandy Snap														Safe
QLD	Peter & Gary	7	6	7	6	6	—	3	6	9	5	5	9	69	3rd	Safe
Ep 18	28 February	La Côte d'Or														Safe
Dishes	Entrée	Moreton Bay Bugs with Lemon and Garlic and a Fresh Baguette														Safe
Dishes	Main	Duck Galantine with Orange Sauce, Duck Fat Roast Potatoes and Snow Peas														Safe
Dishes	Dessert	Rhubarb Crème Brûlée														Safe

=== Top 11 ===
==== People's Choice Challenge: Bed & Breakfast ====
- Episode 19
- Airdate – 29 February 2012
- Description – For the First People's Choice Challenge, the teams took over Bed and Breakfast and are headed to the Blue Mountains. Each team cooked in different Bed and Breakfast kitchens. For this first round Meg and Simon were immune from elimination due to coming first in the third round of instant restaurant and thus not taking part in the challenge. They served to the B&B owners, their families. They had 1 and a half hours to cook for 50 guests and each voted for their favorite dish. Whoever got the most votes would join Meg and Simon in the safety zone and Manu and Pete would choose the worst dish and they would go to an elimination sudden death cook-off. The teams had 15 minutes to get all their ingredients for their dish in a local supermarket.

Teams		Dish	Result
NZ	Simon & Meg	Immune	
VIC	Carly & Emily	Blueberry Brioche Cup with Labneh Yoghurt	People's Choice
NSW	Steve & Helen	Mediterranean Pancakes with Fig Compote and Yoghurt Cream	Competing in Rapid Cook Off
WA	Angela & Justine	Baked Pancetta Eggs with Italian Beans and Corn Muffins	Competing in Rapid Cook Off
SA	Leigh & Jennifer	Slow Cooked Eggs with Green Sauce	Competing in Rapid Cook Off
QLD	David & Scott	Field Mushrooms with Asparagus, Cherry Tomatoes, Poached Eggs and Chutney	Competing in Rapid Cook Off
NSW	Sam & Jillian	French Toast with Banana Cream and Strawberry Syrup	Competing in Rapid Cook Off
SA	Nic & Rocco	Bacon, Egg and Spinach Parcels	Competing in Rapid Cook Off
TAS	Megan & Andy	Bacon, Leek and Gruyere Tarts with Roasted Tomatoes and Rocket	Competing in Rapid Cook Off
QLD	Peter & Gary	Breakfast Crepe with Chive Veloute	Competing in Rapid Cook Off
VIC	Thomas & Carla	Honey Chicken and Roasted Almond Filo with Blueberry Marmalade and Goats Cheese	Through to Sudden Death

==== Kitchen Cook Off ====
- Episode 20
- Airdate – 1 March 2012
- Description – For the Kitchen Cook off, teams were fighting it out to see who would go against Thomas and Carla in the sudden death elimination challenge. Simon and Meg along with Emily and Carly served as diners as they were already safe, while Thomas and Carla were waiting to see who they would face in the sudden death cook-off. The eight remaining teams would be in a rapid fire cook off where they would have 30 minutes at the end of the rapid fire – 4 would be safe and 4 would not and had to cook in a showdown to see who would go head to head with Thomas and Carla. The key ingredient for the Rapid Cook Off was chicken and how they cook the chicken was predetermined by what bench they chose. Under each bench was a piece of equipment they must use and hell was breaking loose. However, the teams had a minute to switch equipments, but no teams switch equipments. For the Showdown, the new ingredients were salt and pepper. Salt or pepper had to play a critical role in the flavour of the team's dish and they had one hour to finish their dish.

Rapid Cook Off
Teams		Equipment	Dish	Result
NSW	Steve & Helen	Wok	Basil Chicken with Snow Peas and Rice	Safe
WA	Angela & Justine	Deep fryer	Crispy Chicken on Asian Rice Noodle Salad	Safe
SA	Leigh & Jennifer	Baking tray	Drunken Chicken with Chilli Bean Sauce and Cucumber Salad	Safe
QLD	David & Scott	Baking tray	Prosciutto Wrapped Chicken with Snow Peas and Mash	Safe
NSW	Sam & Jillian	Wok	Chicken Roulade with Glazed Vegetables	Through to Showdown
SA	Nic & Rocco	Griddle pan	Grilled Chicken with Mushroom Risotto and White Basil Sauce	Through to Showdown
TAS	Megan & Andy	Deep fryer	Mexican Schnitzel with Salsa Verde and Cous Cous Salad	Through to Showdown
QLD	Peter & Gary	Griddle pan	Chicken Mango Salad	Through to Showdown
Showdown
Teams		Dish		Result
SA	Nic & Rocco	Pepper Crab with Egg Noodles		Safe
TAS	Megan & Andy	Blackened Fish with Lemon Butter Sauce and Potato Stack		Safe
QLD	Peter & Gary	Roast Beef with Green Peppercorn Sauce, Potatoes and Carrots		Safe
NSW	Sam & Jillian	Poached Pears with Pepper Spiced Syrup and Pepper Tuile		Through to Sudden Death

==== Sudden Death ====
- Episode 21
- Airdate – 5 March 2012
- Description – After the Sudden Death, a second team would be eliminated with Thomas & Carla would face off against NSW’s team Sam & Jillian in the sudden death cook off. The two teams were told that they would serve not only Pete and Manu but as well as the guest judges which were composed of Guy Grossi, Tobie Puttock, Karen Martini and Liz Egan. The teams would be serving a three course meal of Entree, Main and Dessert. After serving three courses each judge would give a score out of 10. They had one and a half hours to serve their entree, an hour before serving their main and 30 minutes before dessert.

Sudden Death Cook-Off Results
Sudden Death Cook-Off 1
Teams		Judges Scores						Total (out of 60)	Result
Teams		Karen	Tobie	Liz	Guy	Pete	Manu	Total (out of 60)	Result
VIC	Thomas & Carla	7	6	6	7	6	7	39	Safe
Dishes	Entree	Seared Tuna with Bitter Greens							Safe
Dishes	Main	Slow Cooked Pork Belly with Pea Puree and Potato Rosti							Safe
Dishes	Dessert	Carla’s Chocolate Cups							Safe
NSW	Sam & Jillian	5	5	5	6	5	6	32	Eliminated
Dishes	Entree	Seared Scallops with Parsnip Puree and Prosciutto Crumbs							Eliminated
Dishes	Main	Spiced Lamb Cutlets with Onion Sauce							Eliminated
Dishes	Dessert	Chocolate Martini with Raspberries							Eliminated

=== Top 10 ===
==== People's Choice Challenge: Melbourne Cook-off ====
- Episode 22
- Airdate – 6 March 2012
- Description – For the second People's Choice Challenge, they would be cooking in the industrial kitchen, before selling their food on the streets through spruiking. The team who makes the most money would be the people’s choice and would be safe however if the judges deem your food as the worst, they would be sent into the sudden death cook-off. They had an hour and a half to cook their food. The teams would then be selling their dish in a ‘Pop up’ food stalls ‘on wheels’. They would have an hour to sell in the streets. Pete and Manu then announced that there was only a $20 difference between first and second place. The two top scoring teams were Steve & Helen and Carly & Emily, with Steve & Helen coming on top with $348 and winning the people's choice.

Teams		Dish	Result
NSW	Steve & Helen	Mezze Platter with Lamb Souvlaki	People's Choice
WA	Angela & Justine	Chocolate Chilli Con Carne with Salsa & Guacamole	Through to Rapid Cook Off
SA	Leigh & Jennifer	Pork Tortilla with Salsa & Cheesy Corn	Through to Rapid Cook Off
QLD	David & Scott	Mediterranean Club Sandwich with Chicken, Roasted Vegetables & Prosciutto	Through to Rapid Cook Off
VIC	Thomas & Carla	Beef & Bean Tacos with Guacamole & Salsa	Through to Rapid Cook Off
NZ	Simon & Meg	Beef Noodles with Coriander Pesto	Through to Rapid Cook Off
SA	Nic & Rocco	Profiteroles with Chocolate & Strawberries	Through to Rapid Cook Off
TAS	Megan & Andy	San Choy Bow with Prawns and Sweet Chilli Sauce	Through to Rapid Cook Off
VIC	Carly & Emily	Thai Green Curry with Baked Rice and Roti Bread	Through to Rapid Cook Off
QLD	Peter & Gary	Deep Fried Chicken Strips with Vegetable Skewers	Through to Sudden Death

==== Kitchen Cook-off ====
- Episode 23
- Airdate – 7 March 2012
- Description – In the Rapid Cook-off, the 8 remaining teams had to cook at Kitchen Headquarters to decide who would join Peter & Gary in the next sudden death cook-off. The teams would have 30 minutes to cook with the 4 weakest dishes heading to the showdown and only one team member can cook. However, for the second twist, the ones who chose the ingredients would be the decision maker as the other would be the cook, they were then told to swap. Their challenge for the showdown was to make a dish that represented what they mean to the competition and they only had one hour to make it.

Rapid Cook Off
Teams		Cook	Dish	Result
SA	Leigh & Jennifer	Leigh	Thai Cured Salmon Salad with Raw Vegetables	Safe
NZ	Simon & Meg	Meg	Whiting with Smashed Potatoes	Safe
TAS	Megan & Andy	Megan	Chocolate Volcano Cake with Strawberry Coulis	Safe
VIC	Thomas & Carla	Thomas	Ricotta Ravioli with Tomato and Vegetable Salad	Safe
WA	Angela & Justine	Angela	Pistachio Crusted Pork Cutlet with Tomatoes, Asparagus and Sweet Potato	Through to Showdown
QLD	David & Scott	Scott	Tempura Octopus with Tempura Vegetables and Soy Sauce	Through to Showdown
SA	Nic & Rocco	Rocco	Capsicum Tart with Salad and Sticky Balsamic	Through to Showdown
VIC	Carly & Emily	Emily	Chocolate Brownie with Chocolate Ganache and Praline	Through to Showdown
Showdown
Teams		Dish		Result
WA	Angela & Justine	Fettuccine with Salami, Tomato and Fennel Sauce		Safe
SA	Nic & Rocco	Herb Printed Ravioli with Sage Butter Sauce, Asparagus and Pancetta		Safe
QLD	David & Scott	Roasted Spatchcock with Sweet Potato Puree, Broccolini and Beurre Blanc		Safe
VIC	Carly & Emily	Duck with Cherry Marsala Sauce, Potato Gratin and Chargrilled Asparagus		Through to Sudden Death

==== Sudden Death ====
- Episode 24
- Airdate – 8 March 2012
- Description – For the sudden death, it would be rivals Peter & Gary and Carly & Emily where one would be eliminated after the cook-off. The two teams rivalry began at the Instant Restaurant round where Peter & Gary felt that they deserved to be in the top 3 over Carly & Emily. Peter thinks that the girls will do anything to win this competition. Emily then replied "Our young age is on our side because we are speedy, we can run around like no one’s business", with a reply from Peter "Your young age which equates to me as inexperience". Carly then said "We will find out today". Peter & Gary scored the lowest score in MKR history.

Sudden Death Cook-Off Results
Sudden Death Cook-Off 2
Teams		Judges Scores						Total (out of 60)	Result
Teams		Karen	Tobie	Liz	Guy	Pete	Manu	Total (out of 60)	Result
VIC	Carly & Emily	8	8	9	8	9	9	51	Safe
Dishes	Entree	Dumplings with Chinese Red Vinegar and Ginger							Safe
Dishes	Main	Steamed Rock Ling with Ginger, Soy, Snow Pea Leaves and Steamed Rice							Safe
Dishes	Dessert	Black Rice Pudding with Mango and Coconut Mousse							Safe
QLD	Peter & Gary	3	3	3	2	3	3	17	Eliminated
Dishes	Entree	Cauliflower and Spinach Soup with Damper							Eliminated
Dishes	Main	Kangaroo Stroganoff with Garlic Mash and Sweet Roast Baby Carrots							Eliminated
Dishes	Dessert	Custard Tartlets with Bananas Foster							Eliminated

=== Top 9 ===
==== People's Choice Challenge: North Queensland Festival ====
- Episode 25
- Airdate – 11 March 2012
- Description – For this week the teams headed to Tropical North Queensland. The remaining teams find themselves in Ingham, a small quintessential sugar cane town. Their challenge was to create sweet treats for the town’s annual Harvest Festival using an ingredient the locals known best sugar. The locals would vote for their favourite sweet treat and would be awarded People’s Choice and be safe at the next elimination, while Manu and Pete would decide the day’s worse dish and would head to sudden death. The winners would also receive a very special surprise reward of handing another team immunity. They had one and a half hours and great Queensland produce.

Teams		Dish	Result
QLD	David & Scott	Banana Tartlet with Mascarpone Cream and Praline	People's Choice
SA	Nic & Rocco	Tropical Fruit and Custard Tarts	Given Immunity and shared reward
NSW	Steve & Helen	Fruit and Nut Scroll	Through to Rapid Cook Off
WA	Angela & Justine	Banana Lounge Cake	Through to Rapid Cook Off
SA	Leigh & Jennifer	Ginger Wafer with White Chocolate Cream and Tropical Fruits	Through to Rapid Cook Off
VIC	Thomas & Carla	Dark Chocolate Cupcakes with Cookies and Buttercream	Through to Rapid Cook Off
NZ	Simon & Meg	White Chocolate Caramel Mudcakes with Brandy Snaps	Through to Rapid Cook Off
VIC	Carly & Emily	Chocolate Honeycomb Cheesecake Cones	Through to Rapid Cook Off
TAS	Megan & Andy	Tropical Fruit Crepes with Passionfruit Syrup	Through to Sudden Death

==== Camper Kitchen Cook Off ====
- Episode 26
- Airdate – 12 March 2012
- Description – In this Rapid Cook-off, the teams would be racing for their ingredients, teams had to cook on makeshift camp kitchens. Their guests tonight were people who knew camp cooking better than anyone. At Port Douglas the teams embarked on an Amazing Race style challenge to source the best ingredients the quickest and get to their campsite first. The first three teams to arrive would cook mains and the last three would do desserts. The weakest team would go sudden death against Megan and Andy.

Teams		Course	Dish	Result
NSW	Steve & Helen	Dessert	Blueberry Mahalabia with Strawberry Sugar Syrup and Berries	Safe
WA	Angela & Justine	Main	Asian Style Prawns	Safe
SA	Leigh & Jennifer	Main	Beef Fillet with Green Papaya Salad and Wing Beans	Safe
NZ	Simon & Meg	Main	Prawn, Scallop and Avocado Salad	Safe
VIC	Carly & Emily	Dessert	Passionfruit Brulee Tarts with Drunken Pineapple	Safe
VIC	Thomas & Carla	Dessert	Peach and Raspberry Streusel	Through to Sudden Death

==== Sudden Death ====
- Episode 27
- Airdate – 13 March 2012
- Description – The contestants rock up to a poolside meeting with the judges. Pete introduces the team to the Mission Beach, before Manu debriefs on the challenge ahead. They had to cook the best three course meal, tropical style, using ingredients that symbolize North East Queensland. The key ingredients they had to use were Moreton Bay Bugs, Macadamia Nuts and Mango. They could use the ingredients however they like, but they had to shine through at least one of their courses. They had one and a half hours before the entrees had to be on the tables.

Sudden Death Cook-Off Results
Sudden Death Cook-Off 3
Teams		Judges Scores						Total (out of 60)	Result
Teams		Karen	Tobie	Liz	Guy	Pete	Manu	Total (out of 60)	Result
TAS	Megan & Andy	7	7	6	7	7	7	41	Through to the next round
Dishes	Entree	Mango Salsa with Prawns and Rocket							Through to the next round
Dishes	Main	Angel Hair Pasta with Moreton Bay Bugs							Through to the next round
Dishes	Dessert	Pear and Macadamia Tart with Honey Glaze							Through to the next round
VIC	Thomas & Carla	6	5	5	6	5	5	32	Eliminated
Dishes	Entree	Moreton Bay Bug Cakes with Sweet Chilli Sauce							Eliminated
Dishes	Main	Paneer and Macadamia Kofta with Coriander Sauce							Eliminated
Dishes	Dessert	Mango Cream with Coconut Tuile							Eliminated

=== Top 8 ===
==== People's Choice Challenge: Seafood Platter Meal ====
- Episode 28
- Airdate – 14 March 2012
- Description – For the first time the teams were cooking at Kitchen HQ for the People's Choice Challenge. The judges announced that since Easter was just around the corner, the theme for their dishes was Easter. They had to create an Easter-themed banquet with seafood. The teams would be cooking for 40 VIP’s. The winners would be immune from elimination while the weakest dish chose by Pete and Manu would be thrown straight into sudden death cook-off. They would all have an hour and a half to prepare their dishes. They all head to off for a fifteen-minute shopping run to ‘create’ their dishes. The VIP's were the friends and family of the teams. The teams would be the one voting for each other and deciding the People's Choice

Teams		Dish	Result
TAS	Megan & Andy	Warm Ocean Trout Nicoise Salad	People's Choice
NSW	Steve & Helen	Sweet and Spicy Barramundi with Prawns	Through to Rapid Cook Off
WA	Angela & Justine	Barramundi with Roasted Capsicum Salsa and Parmesan Crusted Mussels	Through to Rapid Cook Off
SA	Leigh & Jennifer	Tarator Crusted Whole Salmon with Tabbouleh	Through to Rapid Cook Off
QLD	David & Scott	Basil and Parmesan Crusted Salmon with Kipfler Salad and Beurre Blanc	Through to Rapid Cook Off
SA	Nic & Rocco	Ocean Trout Cartoccio	Through to Rapid Cook Off
VIC	Carly & Emily	Japanese Seafood Platter	Through to Rapid Cook Off
NZ	Simon & Meg	Stuffed Baby Squid with Almond and Lemon Cous Cous and New Zealand Mussels	Through to Sudden Death

==== Kitchen Cook-off ====
- Episode 29
- Airdate – 15 March 2012
- Description – With Simon & Meg up for elimination, the 6 remaining teams would fight to avoid the sudden death cook-off. Manu then asks them what ingredient did they absolutely hate as a kid. The teams had to use those ingredients. The 4 weakest teams would cook-off in the showdown. For the showdown, The judges announced that since they have cooked with unpopular ingredients, they would now cook with a key ingredient that kids and adults love - Chocolate. They would have 90 minutes to make a dish that would make chocolate as its stand-out ingredient.

Rapid Cook Off
Teams		Key Ingredient	Dish	Result
WA	Angela & Justine	Liver	Chicken Livers with Mashed Potato and Brandy Cream Sauce	Safe
SA	Leigh & Jennifer	Sardines	Sardines Escabeche with Parsley Salad and Crostini	Safe
QLD	David & Scott	Olives	Olive Damper with Olive Tapenade and Cream Cheese	Through to Showdown
NSW	Steve & Helen	Brussels sprouts	Brussels Sprouts with Lemon Chicken	Through to Showdown
SA	Nic & Rocco	Blue Cheese	Blue Cheese and Caramelised Onion Tart	Through to Showdown
VIC	Carly & Emily	Tofu	Asian Stuffed Tofu	Through to Showdown
Showdown
Teams		Dish		Result
SA	Nic & Rocco	Chocolate Rum Delight		Safe
QLD	David & Scott	Chocolate Three Ways - Sponge, Ganache and Mousse on a bed of Custard		Safe
VIC	Carly & Emily	Bittersweet Chocolate Cake with Chocolate Mousse and Brandy Raisin Sauce		Safe
NSW	Steve & Helen	Chocolate Cake with Chocolate Ganache		Through to Sudden Death

==== Sudden Death ====
- Episode 30
- Airdate – 18 March 2012
- Description – National pride was on the line as Kiwi’s Meg and Simon went head to head against New South Wales brother and sister team Steve and Helen in the sudden death cook-off. The cook-off would be a Trans Tasman challenge – Australia vs New Zealand. The two teams were making a three dish course.

Sudden Death Cook-Off Results
Sudden Death Cook-Off 4
Teams		Judges Scores						Total (out of 60)	Result
Teams		Karen	Tobie	Liz	Guy	Pete	Manu	Total (out of 60)	Result
NSW	Steve & Helen	6	7	6	6	7	6	38	Through to the next round
Dishes	Entree	Black Ink Cuttlefish with Fennel Salad							Through to the next round
Dishes	Main	Rabbit Stifado with Garlic Mash							Through to the next round
Dishes	Dessert	Orange Trifle Cake							Through to the next round
NZ	Simon & Meg	6	6	6	6	7	6	37	Eliminated
Dishes	Entree	Salmon and Prawn Roulade							Eliminated
Dishes	Main	Crusted Lamb with Pomegranate Salad							Eliminated
Dishes	Dessert	Individual Cherry and Chocolate Cake							Eliminated

=== Elimination week ===
In the Elimination Week, The judges announced that one team would be eliminated from the competition every night until only four teams remained. The judges also revealed that they were not the only one that the teams had to impress. In another surprise twist, the teams would face their harshest critics yet with the shock arrival of a jury. The teams are left dumbfounded when they see who came to dinner. The jury was composed of eliminated contestants. Manu and Pete revealed that the jury would determine one of the weakest teams while Pete and Manu would decide the other. The Jury would score each dish out of 10 as a team. The weakest team chosen by the Jury and the one chosen by Pete and Manu would head straight to a sudden death cook-off.

==== Round 1 ====
- Episode 31
- Airdate – 19 March 2012
- Description – Pete and Manu announced that the key ingredient for the first round of the elimination week was found in every home in Australia. The key ingredient was meat mince, however the teams could choose their type of meat mince whether it be chicken, lamb, veal, pork or the classic beef. The dishes for the teams were as follows

Team		Dish	Results
NSW	Steve & Helen	Lamb Mince with Polenta Bake	Safe
SA	Leigh & Jennifer	Beef and Lamb Dumplings with Butter Sauce and Yoghurt	Safe
QLD	David & Scott	Open Beef Lasagne with Chilli and Tomato Concasse	Safe
SA	Nic & Rocco	Pork and Fennel Meatballs with Fresh Pasta	Safe
VIC	Carly & Emily	Thai Pork Stuffed Omelette with Chilli Cucumber Salad	Safe
WA	Angela & Justine	Beef Meatballs with Pasta	Through to Sudden Death (Jury Vote)
TAS	Megan & Andy	Greek Lamb Souvlaki with Homemade Tortillas and Minted Yoghurt	Through to Sudden Death (Judges Choice)

- Verdict – After the down-the-line Cook-off, the jury's verdict was that Angela & Justine was the weakest dish with a score of 12/50. Although the individual votes of jury wasn't revealed. Peter then revealed the reason why Angela & Justine was the weakest dish was that packet pasta and tasteless meatballs won’t cut it. Pete and Manu reveal that the team to go to the elimination cook off was Megan and Andy.

Teams		Judges Scores						Total (out of 60)	Result
Teams		Karen	Tobie	Liz	Guy	Pete	Manu	Total (out of 60)	Result
TAS	Megan & Andy	9	9	10	9	10	10	57	Safe
Signature Dish		Coral Trout with Crab & Prawn Bisque and Asparagus							Safe
WA	Angela & Justine	8	7	8	8	8	8	47	Eliminated
Signature Dish		Vietnamese Duck with Coconut Rice and Asian Salad							Eliminated

==== Round 2 ====
- Episode 32
- Airdate – 20 March 2012
- Description – For the second round of elimination week, the key ingredient for the down-the-line cook-off was cheese. The teams similar to round 1 had a choice of what type of cheese they wanted to use. The dishes for the teams were as follows:

Team		Dish	Results
NSW	Steve & Helen	Cheese & Spinach Gozleme with Cypriot Salad	Safe
TAS	Megan & Andy	Cheese Arancini Balls with Tomato Relish	Safe
SA	Nic & Rocco	Lemon Curd Cheesecake with Italian Meringue	Safe
VIC	Carly & Emily	Four Cheese Ravioli with Basil Pesto	Safe
SA	Leigh & Jennifer	Four Cheese Borek with Parsnip Skordalia	Through to Sudden Death (Jury Vote)
QLD	David & Scott	Seafood Mornay with Rough Puff Pastry	Through to Sudden Death (Judges Choice)

- Verdict – After the down-the-line cook-off. The jury's vote was first revealed and the jury chosen Leigh & Jennifer as the weakest team with a score of 13/60. Peter as the jury spokesperson, stated "We the jury find you guilty of not meeting the brief and laziness.” Leigh accused the jury of foul play stating "I wish people would just judge the food. Not because people have been doing well and they want to bring them down". Pete & Manu then selected their weakest dish as David & Scott's Seafood Mornay. Jennifer stated she doesn't want cook against them with both girls teared up after it was announced they were facing David & Scott.

Teams		Judges Scores						Total (out of 60)	Result
Teams		Karen	Tobie	Liz	Guy	Pete	Manu	Total (out of 60)	Result
SA	Leigh & Jennifer	9	9	8	8	9	9	52	Safe
Signature Dish		Mulloway with Celeriac Puree and Beurre Rough							Safe
QLD	David & Scott	8	8	8	8	8	9	49	Eliminated
Signature Dish		Lobster with Gnocchi and Prawn Sauce							Eliminated

==== Round 3 ====
- Episode 33
- Airdate – 21 March 2012
- Description – For the third round of elimination week, the key ingredient for the all-line cook-off was citrus fruit. They could however choose whichever citrus fruit they want maybe like lime, lemon, etc. The dishes for the teams were as follows:

Team		Dish	Results
SA	Leigh & Jennifer	Chocolate and Orange Surprise with Filo Cigar	Safe (Through to Semifinals)
SA	Nic & Rocco	Limoncello Chicken with Orange Salad	Safe (Through to Semifinals)
VIC	Carly & Emily	Lemon Tart with Orange Glazed Strawberries and Orange Syrup	Safe (Through to Semifinals)
TAS	Megan & Andy	Citrus Cake with Sticky Orange Syrup and Lemon Mascarpone	Through to Sudden Death (Jury Vote)
NSW	Steve & Helen	Pork Fricassee with Egg and Lemon Sauce	Through to Sudden Death (Judges Choice)

- Verdict – After the down-the-line cook-off. With a score of 42/70, the jury choose Andy & Megan as the weakest team. Pete & Manu then chose the team of Helen & Steve. With the nomination of the two teams, Nic & Rocco, Carly & Emily, and Leigh & Jennifer headed to the finals. As Helen & Steve and Andy & Megan fight it off in a sudden death cook-off for a place in the finals.

Teams		Judges Scores						Total (out of 60)	Result
Teams		Karen	Tobie	Liz	Guy	Pete	Manu	Total (out of 60)	Result
TAS	Megan & Andy	8	8	8	9	8	9	50	Safe (Through to Semifinals)
Signature Dish		Jambalaya with Mussels and Prawns							Safe (Through to Semifinals)
NSW	Steve & Helen	6	6	6	6	6	6	36	Eliminated
Signature Dish		Rolled Chicken with Greek Cheese Sauce and Spinach Rice							Eliminated

=== Semifinals ===
==== Kitchen Cook-off: Seeding Round ====
- Episode 34
- Airdate – 22 March 2012
- Description – The teams had to compete in 2 challenges and fight for point and be ranked 1 to 4 to see who would go head to head in the semi-finals. The 1st place would cook against 4th place, while 2nd would cook against 3rd. Manu and Pete would be the one giving points to each dish.

===== Round 1 =====
- Description – The first test was a rapid cook off and would be their last and they only have 30 minutes The key ingredient was chosen by the jury and was chilli. Tonight only one person could cook each dish for 15 minutes and then swap – while the other was cooking, the partner could not watch what the other was making. Leigh, Nic, Megan, and Carly were the first ones to cook. While, Jennifer, Rocco, Andy, and Emily were the last ones to cook and were the one that was going to plate-up.

Teams		Dish	Pete	Manu	Subtotal	Place
VIC	Carly & Emily	Prawn and Chicken Laksa	9	9	18	1st
SA	Leigh & Jennifer	Chilli Prawns	8	9	17	2nd
TAS	Megan & Andy	Chilli Pork with Noodle Salad	7	8	15	3rd
SA	Nic & Rocco	Crispy Spicy Kingfish with Chilli Lime Dressing	7	7	14	4th

===== Round 2 =====
- Description – After round 1 Carly & Emily took first place. For round 2, the only limit the teams were given was their own imagination. The dish needed to show their skills, techniques and capabilities in 1 and a half hours. After the end of the two rounds, Jennifer & Leigh came in first with 37 points and would be taking on Megan & Andy who came in fourth with 31 points for the first semifinal. In the second semifinal it would see Carly & Emily who came in second with 36 points taking on third place Nic & Rocco with 34 points.

Teams		Dish	Pete	Manu	Round 1	Total	Place
SA	Leigh & Jennifer	Massaman Curry with Roti and Pickled Salad	10	10	17	37	1st
VIC	Carly & Emily	Chinese Duck Two Ways – Peking Duck with Pancakes and Duck San Choy Bow	9	9	18	36	2nd
SA	Nic & Rocco	Macarons 6 Ways - Mango, Lemon, Chocolate, Pistachio, Raspberry and Blueberry	10	10	14	34	3rd
TAS	Megan & Andy	Calamari Schnitzel with Scallops and Crab Mash	8	8	15	31	4th

==== Semifinal 1 ====
- Episode 35
- Airdate – 25 March 2012
- Description – In the first semi-final it would be South Australia’s Princess and florist, Jennifer and Leigh taking on Tassies seafood superchef’s Megan and Andy. Whoever won tonight was through to the grand final, while we would say goodbye to the other team tonight. The challenge for the semifinals was to make the ultimate 3 course meal.

Semifinal 1
Teams		Judges Scores						Total (out of 60)	Result
Teams		Karen	Tobie	Liz	Guy	Pete	Manu	Total (out of 60)	Result
SA	Leigh & Jennifer	8	9	8	9	9	9	52	Safe (Through to Grand Final)
Dishes	Entree	Confit of Murray Cod with Spring Onion, Ginger and Fennel							Safe (Through to Grand Final)
Dishes	Main	Twice Cooked Pigeon with Farro and Beetroot Puree							Safe (Through to Grand Final)
Dishes	Dessert	Chocolate and Earl Gray Tea Tart with Chocolate Chantilly							Safe (Through to Grand Final)
TAS	Megan & Andy	7	8	7	8	8	8	46	Eliminated
Dishes	Entree	Sesame Seed Pork Rice Paper Rolls							Eliminated
Dishes	Main	Rich Seafood Chowder in a Cobb Loaf							Eliminated
Dishes	Dessert	Chocolate Marquise with Creme Anglaise and Almond Tuiles							Eliminated

==== Semifinal 2 ====
- Episode 36
- Airdate – 26 March 2012
- Description – In the second semifinal childhood mates Nic & Rocco took on siblings Carly & Emily. Where, the winner would take on Leigh & Jennifer for the My Kitchen Rules title. Like the 1st Semifinal teams had to cook the ultimate three course dish for the judge.

Semifinal 2
Teams		Judges Scores						Total (out of 60)	Result
Teams		Karen	Tobie	Liz	Guy	Pete	Manu	Total (out of 60)	Result
SA	Nic & Rocco	7	7	7	8	8	7	44	Safe (Through to Grand Final)
Dishes	Entree	Bird’s Nest Pasta							Safe (Through to Grand Final)
Dishes	Main	King George Whiting with Shellfish Mousseline							Safe (Through to Grand Final)
Dishes	Dessert	Dolci Misti - Chocolate Mousse Panna Cotta and Zuppa Inglese							Safe (Through to Grand Final)
VIC	Carly & Emily	8	7	7	7	7	7	43	Eliminated
Dishes	Entree	Dukkah Crusted Scallops with Beetroot & Goat Cheese Salad							Eliminated
Dishes	Main	Duck Confit with Duck Neck Sausage and White Bean Puree							Eliminated
Dishes	Dessert	Persian Love Cakes with Panna Cotta and Fresh Figs							Eliminated

=== Grand final ===
- Episode 37
- Airdate – 27 March 2012
- Description – In the Grand Finale it was South Australia vs South Australia as Leigh & Jennifer took on Nic & Rocco. The final test for the South Australians' was faultless food. Each team had to cook 5 courses and produce 100 plates of food. The teams instant restaurant names were behind their respective benches – “Burlesque” for the girls and “Double Trouble” for the boys. The two teams had the eliminated teams and their love ones as diners. After the five courses, the judges scored the menu of each team, the highest scoring team was crowned the My Kitchen Rules 2012 champions and walked away with the $250,000 prize money.

Grand final
Teams		Judges Scores						Total (out of 60)	Result
Teams		Karen	Tobie	Liz	Guy	Pete	Manu	Total (out of 60)	Result
SA	Leigh & Jennifer	9	10	9	10	10	10	58	Winners
Dishes		Burlesque							Winners
1st Course		Crab Congee							Winners
2nd Course		Scallops in XO Sauce							Winners
3rd Course		Quail with Barberry and Quinoa							Winners
4th Course		Wagyu Beef Ribs with Bone Marrow and Cauliflower Puree							Winners
5th Course		Chocolate Hazelnut Cake							Winners
SA	Nic & Rocco	8	9	8	9	9	9	52	Runners-up
Dishes		Double Trouble							Runners-up
1st Course		Seared Moroccan Tuna with Cured Salmon							Runners-up
2nd Course		Bug Tails with Fennel Puree and Chorizo Essence							Runners-up
3rd Course		Spatchcock Two Ways with Heirloom Carrots and Thyme Crumbs							Runners-up
4th Course		Poached Pork Belly with Potato Discs and Fresh Horseradish							Runners-up
5th Course		Chocolate Raspberry Pop Delight							Runners-up

== Ratings ==
Colour key:
– Highest rating during the series
– Lowest rating during the series
– An elimination was held in this episode
– Finals week

Wk	Episode		Original airdate	Timeslot	Viewers (millions)	Nightly rank	Ref
1	1	Instant Restaurant 1-1: Steve & Helen	30 January 2012	Monday 7:30 pm–8:45 pm	1.484	#1	
1	2	Instant Restaurant 1-2: Angela & Justine	31 January 2012	Tuesday 7:30 pm–8:30 pm	1.466	#1	
1	3	Instant Restaurant 1-3: Leigh & Jennifer	1 February 2012	Wednesday 7:30 pm–8:30 pm	1.503	#1	
1	4	Instant Restaurant 1-4: Simon & Meg	2 February 2012	Thursday 7:30 pm–8:30 pm	1.439	#1	
2	5	Instant Restaurant 1-5: David & Scott	6 February 2012	Monday 7:30 pm–8:30 pm	1.565	#1	
2	6	Instant Restaurant 1-6: Thomas & Carla	7 February 2012	Tuesday 7:30 pm–8:30 pm	1.658	#1	
2	7	Instant Restaurant 2-1: Sam & Jilian	8 February 2012	Wednesday 7:30 pm–8:30 pm	1.453	#1	
2	8	Instant Restaurant 2-2: Emma & Andrew	9 February 2012	Thursday 7:30 pm–8:30 pm	1.560	#1	
3	9	Instant Restaurant 2-3: Nic & Rocco	13 February 2012	Monday 7:30 pm–8:30 pm	1.673	#2	
3	10	Instant Restaurant 2-4: Megan & Andy	14 February 2012	Tuesday 7:30 pm–8:30 pm	1.535	#1	
3	11	Instant Restaurant 2-5: Peter & Gary	15 February 2012	Wednesday 7:30 pm–8:30 pm	1.933	#1	
3	12	Instant Restaurant 2-6: Carly & Emily	16 February 2012	Thursday 7:30 pm–8:30 pm	1.797	#1	
4	13	Instant Restaurant 3-1: Thomas & Carla	20 February 2012	Monday 7:30 pm–8:45 pm	1.810	#1	
4	14	Instant Restaurant 3-2: Simon & Meg	21 February 2012	Tuesday 7:30 pm–8:45 pm	1.682	#1	
4	15	Instant Restaurant 3-3: Megan & Andy	22 February 2012	Wednesday 7:30 pm–8:45 pm	1.633	#1	
4	16	Instant Restaurant 3-4: Emma & Andrew	23 February 2012	Thursday 7:30 pm–8:45 pm	1.638	#1	
5	17	Instant Restaurant 3-5: David & Scott	27 February 2012	Monday 7:30 pm–8:45 pm	1.842	#1	
5	18	Instant Restaurant 3-6: Peter & Gary	28 February 2012	Tuesday 7:30 pm–8:45 pm	1.924	#1	
5	19	People's Choice Challenge: Bed & Breakfast	29 February 2012	Wednesday 7:30 pm–8:45 pm	1.796	#1	
5	20	Kitchen Cook Off 1	1 March 2012	Thursday 7:30 pm–8:45 pm	1.683	#1	
6	21	Sudden Death 1	5 March 2012	Monday 7:30 pm–8:45 pm	1.840	#2	
6	22	People's Choice Challenge: Melbourne Cook-off	6 March 2012	Tuesday 7:30 pm–8:45 pm	1.828	#1	
6	23	Kitchen Cook Off 2	7 March 2012	Wednesday 7:30 pm–8:45 pm	1.721	#1	
6	24	Sudden Death 2	8 March 2012	Thursday 7:30 pm–8:30 pm	1.799	#1	
7	25	People's Choice Challenge: North Queensland Festival	11 March 2012	Sunday 7:30 pm–8:30 pm	1.799	#1	
7	26	Kitchen Cook Off 3	12 March 2012	Monday 7:30 pm–8:30 pm	1.921	#1	
7	27	Sudden Death 3	13 March 2012	Tuesday 7:30 pm–8:30 pm	1.849	#1	
7	28	People's Choice Challenge: Seafood Platter Meal	14 March 2012	Wednesday 7:30 pm–8:45 pm	1.692	#1	
7	29	Kitchen Cook Off 4	15 March 2012	Thursday 7:30 pm–8:30 pm	1.646	#1	
8	30	Sudden Death 4	18 March 2012	Sunday 7:30 pm–8:30 pm	1.710	#1	
8	31	Elimination Week: Round 1	19 March 2012	Monday 7:30 pm–8:30 pm	1.830	#1	
8	32	Elimination Week: Round 2	20 March 2012	Tuesday 7:30 pm–8:30 pm	1.846	#1	
8	33	Elimination Week: Round 3	21 March 2012	Wednesday 7:30 pm–8:45 pm	1.744	#1	
8	34	Kitchen Cook Off - Seeding Round: Round 1 & 2	22 March 2012	Thursday 7:30 pm–8:30 pm	1.791	#1	
9	35	Semi Final 1	25 March 2012	Sunday 7:30 pm–8:30 pm	1.715	#1	
9	36	Semi Final 2	26 March 2012	Monday 7:30 pm–8:30 pm	1.899	#1	
9	37	Grand Finale	27 March 2012	Tuesday 7:30 pm–9:40 pm	2.186	#2	
9	37	Winner Announced	27 March 2012	Tuesday 7:30 pm–9:40 pm	2.675	#1	
Series Average					1.752	#1	
