= List of Australian television ratings for 2015 =

Australian television ratings are measured by the ratings mediator OzTAM, a system that is operated and owned by the Seven Network, Nine Network and Ten Network and was created in 1999. Ratings are measured for around forty weeks of every year, but are not measured during the Australian summer period or at Easter. Ratings are measured for the 5 city metropolitan area, which includes the five states Melbourne, Brisbane, Adelaide, Sydney and Perth. The five major networks (ABC, Seven, Nine, Ten and SBS) are competitive during the time when ratings are measured, for both total viewers and scoring highly in the three key demographics, where they must aim to appeal to 16- to 39-year-olds (younger viewers), 18- to 49-year-olds (the majority) and 25- to 54-year-olds (older viewers). At the end of every week during the ratings season, the network share average (%) for each of the major networks is released, as well as the network that scored highest in the three key demographics. Then, at the end of the year, the data for every week is looked at to compile an overall winner in both categories.

Historically, Seven Network has largely been the winner by having the highest number of total viewers, while Nine Network normally wins all three of the key demographics. These two networks are typically placed first and second, respectively. ABC had long been the fourth placed national network, until 2013, when Network Ten began to fall in the ratings.

== Network shares ==
| Market | Network shares |
|---|---|---|---|---|---|
| Market | ABC | Seven | Nine | Ten | SBS |
| 5 cities | 17.6% | 29.3% | 28.1% | 18.8% | 6.2% |
| Sydney |
| Melbourne |
| Brisbane |
| Adelaide |
| Perth |

== Weekly ratings ==
- From the week beginning, February 8, 2015.

| Week | Network shares | | | | | Top programs |
|---|---|---|---|---|---|---|
| Week | ABC | Seven | Nine | Ten | SBS | Top programs |
| 7 | 18.0% | 31.7% | 29.3% | 16.2% | 4.8% | Seven Network – My Kitchen Rules (1,725,000); Seven Network – My Kitchen Rules (1,685,000); Seven Network – My Kitchen Rules (1,656,000); Seven Network – My Kitchen Rules (1,632,000); Seven Network – My Kitchen Rules (1,490,000) |
| 8 | 18.9% | 32.7% | 26.1% | 17.1% | 5.2% | Seven Network – My Kitchen Rules (1,715,000); Seven Network – My Kitchen Rules (1,708,000); Seven Network – My Kitchen Rules (1,688,000); Seven Network – My Kitchen Rules (1,514,000); Nine Network – House of Hancock (1,380,000) |
| 9 | 19.0% | 31.7% | 26.8% | 17.1% | 5.4% | Seven Network – My Kitchen Rules (1,624,000); Seven Network – My Kitchen Rules (1,501,000); Seven Network – My Kitchen Rules (1,498,000); Seven Network – My Kitchen Rules (1,467,000); Nine Network – Nine News (1,155,000) |
| 10 | 18.2% | 30.9% | 28.0% | 17.3% | 5.6% | Seven Network – My Kitchen Rules (1,649,000); Seven Network – My Kitchen Rules (1,602,000); Seven Network – My Kitchen Rules (1,513,000); Seven Network – My Kitchen Rules (1,433,000); Nine Network – Nine News (1,109,000) |

== Weekly key demographics ==
- From the week beginning, February 8, 2015.

| Week | 16-39 | 18-49 | 25-54 |
|---|---|---|---|
| 7 | Seven Network | Seven Network | Seven Network |
| 8 | Seven Network | Seven Network | Seven Network |
| 9 | Seven Network | Seven Network | Seven Network |
| 10 | Seven Network | Seven Network | Seven Network |

== Key demographics shares ==
| Network | 16-39 | 18-49 | 25-54 |
|---|---|---|---|
| ABC | 10.5% | 11.4% | 12.1% |
| Seven | 28.0% | 28.1% | 28.3% |
| Nine | 30.8% | 30.3% | 30.2% |
| Ten | 25.5% | 24.7% | 23.7% |
| SBS | 5.1% | 5.5% | 5.7% |

== See also ==
- Television ratings in Australia
