= Tobie Puttock =

Australian celebrity chef (born 1974)

Tobie Puttock (born 1974) is an Australian celebrity chef, best known for his association with British chef Jamie Oliver.

== Cooking career ==
Born in Melbourne, Victoria, Puttock trained at Box Hill Institute of TAFE, and first worked at Caffe e Cucina in South Yarra. Working around Australia, and eventually Europe, Puttock first met Jamie Oliver in 1999 at River Café in London, where both of them worked for a time. Puttock returned to Melbourne, where he set up his own Italian restaurant, Termini, and appeared as a regular guest chef on the Australian version of Ready Steady Cook, a cooking game show based on a British format.

In 2001, he was contacted by Oliver, now a well-known celebrity chef, who asked for his help in setting up a training restaurant for underprivileged young people. Puttock returned to London, and helped Oliver set up the first Fifteen restaurant in Hoxton, London. The creation of the restaurant and training scheme formed the basis of a 2002 TV series on Channel 4, Jamie's Kitchen. Puttock remained at Fifteen as executive head chef for several years, until homesickness prompted him to suggest to Oliver that they set up an Australian version of Fifteen in his hometown of Melbourne.

Oliver agreed, and in 2006, a follow-up series Jamie's Kitchen Australia was shown on Australia's Network Ten, which chronicled the establishment of Fifteen Melbourne and the training of its staff.

Puttock was a guest judge on My Kitchen Rules, along with fellow guest judges Karen Martini, Guy Grossi, Liz Egan and judges/hosts Manu Feildel, Pete Evans.

Other television programs that Puttock appeared in after returning to Melbourne include, Lifestyle (Australian TV channel) FOOD TV series, Tobie and Matt - Europe and Asia (2008) as well as co-hosting ‘Wonderful Indonesia Flavours’ Season One and Two for the Asian Food Channel (2015 and 2016).

Puttock has written and released four best selling cookbooks, Daily Italian (2006), Italian Local (2008), Cook like an Italian (2010) and The Chef Gets Healthy (2015), which sees Tobie take a new direction toward healthy eating and a balanced lifestyle. Puttock took a huge interest in plant-based cooking describing himself as “plant curious”. In 2018, Tobie released his fifth cook book titled “SuperNatural”. Puttock also created a series of short format video cook eBooks for 25 countries through iTunes. In 2013, after over 20 years in restaurants, Puttock turned his focus to a YouTube channel. He also worked closely with Oliver and Woolworths on an online video series ‘Jamie's Table’.

At the beginning of 2018, Puttock accepted the role as Creative Director of Oliver's Ministry of Food Australia with the aim to encourage more Australians to eat a healthy and balanced diet.

Puttock consults for Oliver's 'Jamie's Italian Australia' and an ambassador for Prahran Market in Melbourne.

== Personal life ==
Puttock married his girlfriend of five years, Georgia Katz, on 7 April 2007.

He is the godfather of Jamie Oliver's second daughter, Daisy Boo, born April 2003.

== Publications ==
- Puttock, Tobie (2006). Daily Italian. Melbourne: Penguin. ISBN 978-1-920989-50-7.
- Puttock, Tobie (2008). Italian Local. Melbourne: Penguin. ISBN 978-1-920989-75-0.
- Puttock, Tobie (2010). Cook Like an Italian. Melbourne: Penguin. ISBN 978-1-921382-19-2.
- Puttock, Tobie (2015). The Chef Gets Healthy. Melbourne: Penguin. ISBN 978-0-670077-58-8.
- Puttock, Tobie (2018). SuperNatural. Melbourne: Penguin. ISBN 978-0-143792-17-8.
