= Piper O'Neill =

American model and charity worker

- Born: Piper Mary O'Neill; July 21, 1983 (age 43); Portland, Oregon, United States
- Occupations: beauty queen, model, presenter, charity worker
- Spouse: Jordan Green (divorced)
- Children: 2

Piper Mary O'Neill (born July 21, 1983) is an American beauty queen, model, presenter and charity worker.

== Career ==
O'Neill began performing at a young age and was signed to her first modelling agency at age three. She was also a regular model on TVSN, Australia's home shopping channel, before leaving for her controversial appearance on My Kitchen Rules.

O’Neill was crowned Mrs Australia International 2015 on December 23, 2014. She was the first pageant winner in Australian history to be crowned while pregnant.

In 2019, O'Neill competed on the tenth season of the Australian reality television cooking show My Kitchen Rules. She garnered controversy by confessing to have engaged in a casual sexual relationship with competitor Victor Aeberli on the show. In April 2021, the Seven Network was ordered to pay O'Neill workers' compensation for “psychological injury” she suffered from her time on the show due to "vilification and bullying from producers and the network."

== Charity work ==
O'Neill was involved with The Touch of Goodness Foundation, The Cancer Council, Ovarian Cancer Australia, and The National Breast Cancer Foundation. Since 2009, she was a volunteer for Look Good Feel Better, a community service program that teaches cancer patients how to better manage the appearance related side effects caused by cancer treatments.
