= My Kitchen Rules SA =

South African cooking reality show

- Genre: Cooking show
- Judges: J Something; David Higgs
- Country of origin: South Africa
- Original language: English
- No. of seasons: 4

Production
- Producer: Anton Burggraaf
- Running time: 60-120 minutes per episode
- Production company: Picture Tree (2018)

Original release
- Network: M-Net
- Release: 13 August 2017 – present

Related
- My Kitchen Rules

My Kitchen Rules SA is a South African cooking show based on the popular Australian cooking show of the same name. The show premiered in South Africa on M-Net on 13 August 2017. In 2019, My Kitchen Rules SA won the SAFTA for Best International Format Show.
