= My Kitchen Rules =

Australian cooking competition TV series

- Genre: Cooking
- Directed by: Mark Adamson (seasons 1–3, 7–9); Nick Davies (seasons 4–6, 9)
- Judges: Manu Feildel; Colin Fassnidge; Nigella Lawson; Matt Preston; Pete Evans
- Narrated by: Septimus Caton
- Opening theme: "Tik Tok" by Kesha (seasons 1–3); "Best Night" by Justice Crew (seasons 4–9)
- Ending theme: "The Pink Panther" by Christophe Beck (seasons 1–2)
- Composer: Jay Stewart
- Country of origin: Australia
- Original language: English
- No. of series: 15
- No. of episodes: 423

Production
- Executive producers: Rikkie Proost; Matt Apps; Joe Herdman
- Producers: Matt Apps; Greg Swanborough; Evan Wilkes
- Cinematography: Matt Koopmans ACS
- Running time: 60–120 minutes
- Production companies: Seven Productions (2010–2020); ITV Studios Australia (since 2022)

Original release
- Network: Seven Network
- Release: 1 February 2010 – present

Related
- My Restaurant Rules; House Rules; My Reno Rules; My Kitchen Rules NZ; My Kitchen Rules SA

My Kitchen Rules (often abbreviated as MKR) is an Australian competitive cooking game show broadcast on the Seven Network since 2010. The show is currently hosted and judged by chefs Manu Feildel and Colin Fassnidge, with Feildel being the only judge who has appeared in every season of the show. Fellow chef Pete Evans co-hosted until his departure after season 11. Other celebrity chefs and food critics frequently appear as guest judges or mentors in the kitchen. The series was originally produced by the team who created the Seven reality show My Restaurant Rules, and was put into production based on the success of Network 10's MasterChef Australia.

For many years, the program performed strongly in the ratings and was regularly one of the highest rated programs on Australian television, with the finales of each season consistently ranking amongst the top 10 highest rated programs of the year. However ratings declined notably during season 10 in 2019, and with further significant declines for season 11 in 2020, commentators speculated that 2020 would be its final season.

Seven did not renew the series at their annual upfronts in October 2020, but suggested the show may return in future. During Seven’s annual upfronts, the series was confirmed to return for a twelfth season in 2022. In December 2021, Feildel was announced to be returning as a judge. In April 2022, it was announced Nigella Lawson and Matt Preston will be joining the series as judges alongside Feildel with fellow returning judge Colin Fassnidge appearing as a judge in Kitchen HQ alongside Curtis Stone with a quest appearance from new judge Gary Mehigan. In October 2022, the series was renewed for a 13th season which aired from 4 September 2023. For the 13th season Fassnidge became a main judge and co-hosted alongside Feildel, with Lawson returning as judge for the finals, though Preston did not return to the show. In October 2023, the series was renewed for a 14th season which will air on 9 September 2024, with Feildel and Fassnidge returning. The fifteenth season auditions opened in October 2024. The fifteenth season premiered on 1 September 2025. The sixteenth season premiered on 28 September 2026.

== Format ==
=== Contestants ===
The Australian show initially had teams of two contestants with pre-existing relationships—from New South Wales, Queensland, South Australia, Victoria and Western Australia—competing against each other to "transform an ordinary home into an instant restaurant complete with theme and table decorations for one pressure-cooker night." From 2011, the number of competitors grew as teams from Tasmania joined the show. A team from New Zealand took part only in the third season. In the fourth season, there were fifteen teams made up of two teams from each state, plus three additional teams—the gatecrashers—from New South Wales, Victoria and Western Australia. Season 5 introduced a team from the Australian Capital Territory, whilst season 11 marks the first time that there was not a team from South Australia.

Number of teams participated per season
State	Season														
State	1	2	3	4	5	6	7	8	9	10	11	12	13	14	15
New South Wales	2			3	4				6	5	1	3	4	2	
Queensland	2					4	5		5	2	4.5	2			3
South Australia	2								1			2	1		2
Victoria	2			3		4	5	4	2	4.5	4	3	1	2	1
Western Australia	2			3	2	3	2			3.5	0.5	2	1	2	1
Australian Capital Territory					1										
Tasmania		2	1	2	1			1							
New Zealand			1												
Total	10	12	12	15	15	18	18	18	16	16	10	12	9	9	9

=== Judging panel ===
- Series Hosts/Judges – Celebrity chef Manu Feildel has appeared in every season in the show. Pete Evans appeared alongside Feidel until season 11; they have been responsible for all challenges and judging across the series. For season 12, Matt Preston joined the series as a judge, with Nigella Lawson appearing alongside Feildel early in the season. Since season 13, Feildel and Colin Fassnidge feature as the show's as series judges, and were joined by Lawson as a judge in Kitchen HQ for one season.
- Colin Fassnidge (Judge) – Making his first appearance as a guest judge in season 4, Colin joined the blind tasting panel for Sudden Death cook-offs. He was also involved with additional judging roles such as facilitating the Comeback Kitchen and Food Truck challenges in seasons 4 and 5 respectively. In seasons 6 and 7, Colin and Manu had rotated roles for judging. Colin was present for People's Choice and off-site challenges, while Manu was involved in Headquarters challenges. Colin was also featured for the first time in an Instant Restaurant round in the same season. In season 12, Colin appeared as a main judge in the Kitchen HQ.
- Blind Tasting Panel – During Sudden Death cook-off eliminations, the blind tasting panel are asked to score and judge the competing teams' meals. Over the years, this panel has consisted of Liz Egan, Guy Grossi, Karen Martini, Colin Fassnidge, Jacqui Gowan, and Tobie Puttock until season 3. From season 1 to 3, the panel had knowledge of which teams were cooking. From season 4, as a blind tasting panel, they do not know who the competing teams were until scoring. After season 10, all judges were axed from the panel besides Fassnidge who continued to judge the show with Manu Feildel and Pete Evans.
- Guest Judges – Season 7 introduced new special guest judges who appeared in specific challenges alongside the main series panel. They included Rachel Khoo during Round 3 of the Instant restaurants and Curtis Stone during the first Kitchen HQ challenge. In season 8, Darren Robertson was included in an instant restaurant round. Guest judges returned in the twelfth season, with Stone and Gary Mehigan appearing in Kitchen HQ. Julie Goodwin appeared as a guest judge in the grand finale of season 14.

Judges	Season														
Judges	1	2	3	4	5	6	7	8	9	10	11	12	13	14	15
Manu Feildel	Host & Judge	Host & Judge	Host & Judge	Host & Judge	Host & Judge	Host & Judge	Host & Judge	Host & Judge	Host & Judge	Host & Judge	Host & Judge	Host & Judge	Host & Judge	Host & Judge	Host & Judge
Pete Evans	Host & Judge	Host & Judge	Host & Judge	Host & Judge	Host & Judge	Host & Judge	Host & Judge	Host & Judge	Host & Judge	Host & Judge	Host & Judge				
Colin Fassnidge				Blind Tasting Panel/Judge	Blind Tasting Panel/Judge	Blind Tasting Panel/Judge	Blind Tasting Panel/Judge	Blind Tasting Panel/Judge	Blind Tasting Panel/Judge	Blind Tasting Panel/Judge	Host & Judge	Judge	Host & Judge	Host & Judge	Host & Judge
Nigella Lawson												Host & Judge	Judge		
Matt Preston												Host & Judge			
Jacqui Gowan	Tasting Panel														
Tobie Puttock	Tasting Panel	Tasting Panel	Tasting Panel												
Karen Martini	Blind Tasting Panel	Blind Tasting Panel	Blind Tasting Panel	Blind Tasting Panel	Blind Tasting Panel	Blind Tasting Panel	Blind Tasting Panel	Blind Tasting Panel	Blind Tasting Panel	Blind Tasting Panel					
Guy Grossi	Blind Tasting Panel	Blind Tasting Panel	Blind Tasting Panel	Blind Tasting Panel	Blind Tasting Panel	Blind Tasting Panel	Blind Tasting Panel	Blind Tasting Panel	Blind Tasting Panel	Blind Tasting Panel					
Liz Egan		Blind Tasting Panel	Blind Tasting Panel	Blind Tasting Panel	Blind Tasting Panel	Blind Tasting Panel	Blind Tasting Panel	Blind Tasting Panel	Blind Tasting Panel	Blind Tasting Panel					
Rachel Khoo							Guest			Guest					
Darren Robertson								Guest							
Curtis Stone								Guest	Guest	Guest		Guest			
Gary Mehigan												Guest			
Julie Goodwin														Guest	

=== Original format ===
Applicable only during the first season, the show followed a sudden death format—where two teams will cook a three-course meal and the losing team will immediately be eliminated from winning the competition.

- Initially participating teams are split into two groups of five to compete in a separate round of instant restaurant.
- A team who placed last (fifth place) in each instant restaurant group will be eliminated from the competition. However, teams who placed third and fourth will compete in a cook-off, and the two lowest scoring teams will be eliminated.
- After the cook-off, the remaining six teams competed in quarterfinal of three rounds, wherein:
  - #2 teams in both instant restaurant groups competed in first quarterfinal round;
  - #1 team in the first instant restaurant and #1 team in cook-off competed in second quarterfinal round; and
  - #1 team in the second instant restaurant and #2 team in cook-off contended in last quarterfinal round.
- Losing teams of each quarterfinal rounds were immediately eliminated. However, the overall highest scoring team in quarterfinals advanced straight through the grand final. The remaining two teams contended in a semifinal, the last berth to the finale round.

=== Pre-2020 format ===
==== Instant restaurant round ====
Each episode focuses on one team's day of cooking, setting up their instant restaurant and serving a three-course dinner—entrée, main, and dessert—for the judges and their opposing teams. Teams could only start cooking three hours before the other teams and judges arrive at their house. After the team served all three meals to the judges and their opposition, each opposing team must rate the total meal out of ten, then each main judge must rate each of the three courses separately out of ten. The lowest scoring team will be then at risk of elimination.

Contestants do not necessarily cook in their own homes, for example in third season, eight of the twelve couples did not use their own kitchens mainly due to their homes being too small to accommodate the production. In most cases when this happened it is the home of a family member or friend or a holiday home of one or both members of the team.

Team progress and eliminations:

There were variations on format in team progress and elimination process in this round.

- During the first season of the show, the lowest scoring teams (fifth place) of each instant restaurant round were eliminated immediately from the competition. Meanwhile, top two scoring teams on both rounds advanced through to quarterfinals round. Teams placing third and fourth on both instant restaurant rounds have to compete in a Kitchen Cook-off, where two losing teams will be eliminated and the other two will proceed through to quarterfinals.
- On the second season, the lowest scoring teams of each instant restaurant round competed in a Sudden Death cook-off, wherein the losing team was eliminated from the competition. The remaining teams advanced to the People's Choice Challenge—a new competition format replacing quarterfinals round.
- During the third season, the three lowest scoring teams of each instant restaurant round competed in yet another instant restaurant, thus having three rounds for this season. The losing team of the third instant restaurant was eliminated from the competition.
- During the fourth and fifth seasons, there were two rounds of instant restaurant with six teams each, wherein the lowest scoring team of each group was immediately eliminated from the competition. However, after the second round, the tally of the instant restaurant scores for both groups were combined and the three lowest scorers out of the remaining ten teams competed in another instant restaurant round with new set of teams—titled as the gatecrashers. The losing team of the third round was also eliminated from the competition.
- During the sixth season, after the first two groups had completed their rounds, a third instant restaurant group were introduced as 'Colin's secret round'. In that round, Colin Fassnidge is the only judge critiquing that group and is also the first time ever in the show, where Pete and Manu do not make an appearance as hosts. The lowest scoring teams from each of the three groups is eliminated. Then the bottom 2 teams from each group competed in an Instant Restaurant Redemption round to eliminate two more teams.

==== Pre-finals round ====
After the instant restaurants, the remaining teams compete in various challenges, either off-site or at Kitchen headquarters. Teams who cook the best dishes or receive the most votes/money can win People's Choice or Judge's Choice and are given advantages or are guaranteed safety from eliminations. Teams that fail to impress and receive poor reviews from the judges end up in a Sudden Death elimination.

- People's Choice Challenge – During this offsite challenge, teams all have an hour and a half to prepare their dishes relating to a theme or event. The team with the most guest votes (sometimes, the best-selling dish if all are tasked to sell their meal) is declared as the People's Choice and will be safe for the rest of the round or from the next elimination.
- Food Truck – Used only in season 5 (2014), during the rounds from Top 12 to Top 9, remaining teams from the People's Choice will compete in a new Food Truck challenge. This sees teams split into two even groups (dependent on the number of teams remaining in the competition) and will each run competing restaurants, cooking in a large semi-trailer which opens up into two kitchens. Patrons dining will pay for what they believe the meal was worth. To win, the group must earn the most money. The losing group will continue onto the rapid cook-off, whilst the winning group, become safe from elimination and formed as the team's jury.
- Rapid Cook-off – In Kitchen Headquarters, teams are challenged to create a dish using a key ingredient in 30 minutes. All teams will be reviewed by the judges with certain number of teams who will be safe from elimination, and who will be competing in a following showdown. In season 5, dishes were not only judged by Pete and Manu, but also by a teams' jury, which is formed by all teams currently safe for the round. They were able to select one of teams to be safe.
- Showdown – Teams with the worst dishes during rapid cook-off compete in this round by cooking a meal using a core ingredient in 60 minutes. A team with the worst dish, again, will be chosen by the judges and will proceed straight through the Sudden Death round.
- Sudden Death – Two losing teams from challenges battle it out by producing a three-course meal for Pete and Manu, and the four guest judges. Both teams must prepare their dishes in a total of three hours – They have 90 minutes to do prep. and serve an entree, 60 minutes for their main course, and 30 minutes for the dessert. Each judge critiques and scores the total meal out of ten, and the lowest scoring team is eliminated from the competition. From the fourth season, blind tastings were introduced and the guest judges critiqued the dishes without knowing which team cooked it.

==== Finals round ====
Finals round consists of three rounds: two sets of semifinals, and a grand final. All follow a sudden death cook-off format where teams produce a three-course meal for the main judges and for the four guest judges. Teams' meals are scored out of ten by the judges and the lower scoring team is eliminated.

===== Semifinals =====
Prior to the grand final round, four remaining teams compete in a semifinal round. Teams going head-to-head in this round is determined variously in different seasons.

- In the 2011 season, there were four knives on a table, two of which had Semifinal 1 on their labels, and the other two had Semifinal 2 on their blades. The labels were covered, leaving the knife handles visible. Each team was asked to select a knife. Teams which picked Semifinal 1 knives competed in the first semifinal, while teams which chose Semifinal 2 contested the second semifinal.
- In the 2012 season, teams competed in a seeding round. Teams competed in two challenges, and their dishes on each challenge were scored out of ten by the judges. The highest scoring team (#1) of the seeding round cooked against the lowest scoring team (#4) in the first semifinal, while #2 and #3 teams competed in the second semifinal.
- In the 2013 and 2014 season, the final four teams were divided into two semifinal match-ups based on their rankings in the Final 5 round. As in 2012, #1 cooked against #4, and #2 cooked against #3.

===== Grand final =====
Winners of each semifinal go straight through the grand final round, the last stage of the competition. Each team's meal is scored and the higher scoring team is declared My Kitchen Rules champion.

=== Prize money ===
The winner of My Kitchen Rules receives a cash prize:

- In the first two seasons of My Kitchen Rules as well as all seasons from season 11, the prize is A$100,000
- Between the third and tenth seasons, the prize money was A$250,000.

== Series overview ==
Colour legend:
Winner
– Runner-up

Series	Premiere date	Finale date	Number of teams	Competing teams							Host & main judges	Kitchen HQ judges	Guest judges
1	1 February 2010	22 March 2010	10	NSW	Mossy & Gabe	Deb & Ben					Pete Evans; Manu Feildel	Jacqui Gowan; Guy Grossi; Karen Martini; Tobie Puttock	__
1	1 February 2010	22 March 2010	10	QLD	Veronica & Shadi	Tanja & Gen					Pete Evans; Manu Feildel	Jacqui Gowan; Guy Grossi; Karen Martini; Tobie Puttock	__
1	1 February 2010	22 March 2010	10	SA	Paul & Mel	Matt & Melissa					Pete Evans; Manu Feildel	Jacqui Gowan; Guy Grossi; Karen Martini; Tobie Puttock	__
1	1 February 2010	22 March 2010	10	VIC	Clint & Noah	Rowan & Sophia					Pete Evans; Manu Feildel	Jacqui Gowan; Guy Grossi; Karen Martini; Tobie Puttock	__
1	1 February 2010	22 March 2010	10	WA	Holly & Grace	Marc & Natalie					Pete Evans; Manu Feildel	Jacqui Gowan; Guy Grossi; Karen Martini; Tobie Puttock	__
2	31 January 2011	13 April 2011	12	NSW	Sammy & Bella	Alex & Bill					Pete Evans; Manu Feildel	Liz Egan; Guy Grossi; Karen Martini; Tobie Puttock	__
2	31 January 2011	13 April 2011	12	QLD	Artie & Johnnie	Mal & Bec					Pete Evans; Manu Feildel	Liz Egan; Guy Grossi; Karen Martini; Tobie Puttock	__
2	31 January 2011	13 April 2011	12	SA	Anne-Marie & Nick	Donna & Reade					Pete Evans; Manu Feildel	Liz Egan; Guy Grossi; Karen Martini; Tobie Puttock	__
2	31 January 2011	13 April 2011	12	TAS	Esther & Ali	Mel & James					Pete Evans; Manu Feildel	Liz Egan; Guy Grossi; Karen Martini; Tobie Puttock	__
2	31 January 2011	13 April 2011	12	VIC	Kane & Lee	Kelly & Ash					Pete Evans; Manu Feildel	Liz Egan; Guy Grossi; Karen Martini; Tobie Puttock	__
2	31 January 2011	13 April 2011	12	WA	Daniela & Stefania	Kerry & Holly					Pete Evans; Manu Feildel	Liz Egan; Guy Grossi; Karen Martini; Tobie Puttock	__
3	30 January 2012	27 March 2012	12	NSW	Steve & Helen	Sam & Jillian					Pete Evans; Manu Feildel	Liz Egan; Guy Grossi; Karen Martini; Tobie Puttock	__
3	30 January 2012	27 March 2012	12	NZ	Simon & Meg						Pete Evans; Manu Feildel	Liz Egan; Guy Grossi; Karen Martini; Tobie Puttock	__
3	30 January 2012	27 March 2012	12	QLD	David & Scott	Peter & Gary					Pete Evans; Manu Feildel	Liz Egan; Guy Grossi; Karen Martini; Tobie Puttock	__
3	30 January 2012	27 March 2012	12	SA	Leigh & Jennifer	Nic & Rocco					Pete Evans; Manu Feildel	Liz Egan; Guy Grossi; Karen Martini; Tobie Puttock	__
3	30 January 2012	27 March 2012	12	TAS	Megan & Andy						Pete Evans; Manu Feildel	Liz Egan; Guy Grossi; Karen Martini; Tobie Puttock	__
3	30 January 2012	27 March 2012	12	VIC	Carly & Emily	Thomas & Carla					Pete Evans; Manu Feildel	Liz Egan; Guy Grossi; Karen Martini; Tobie Puttock	__
3	30 January 2012	27 March 2012	12	WA	Angela & Justine	Emma & Andrew					Pete Evans; Manu Feildel	Liz Egan; Guy Grossi; Karen Martini; Tobie Puttock	__
4	28 January 2013	28 April 2013	15	NSW	Luke & Scott	Ashlee & Sophia	Jesse & Biswa				Pete Evans; Manu Feildel	Liz Egan; Colin Fassnidge; Guy Grossi; Karen Martini	__
4	28 January 2013	28 April 2013	15	QLD	Dan & Steph	Jake & Elle					Pete Evans; Manu Feildel	Liz Egan; Colin Fassnidge; Guy Grossi; Karen Martini	__
4	28 January 2013	28 April 2013	15	SA	Jenna & Joanna	Lisa & Stefano					Pete Evans; Manu Feildel	Liz Egan; Colin Fassnidge; Guy Grossi; Karen Martini	__
4	28 January 2013	28 April 2013	15	TAS	Mick & Matt	Ali & Samuel					Pete Evans; Manu Feildel	Liz Egan; Colin Fassnidge; Guy Grossi; Karen Martini	__
4	28 January 2013	28 April 2013	15	VIC	Sam & Chris	Angela & Melina	Kerrie & Craig				Pete Evans; Manu Feildel	Liz Egan; Colin Fassnidge; Guy Grossi; Karen Martini	__
4	28 January 2013	28 April 2013	15	WA	Kieran & Nastassia	Josh & Andi	Lisa & Candice				Pete Evans; Manu Feildel	Liz Egan; Colin Fassnidge; Guy Grossi; Karen Martini	__
5	27 January 2014	29 April 2014	15	ACT	Andrew & Emelia						Pete Evans; Manu Feildel	Liz Egan; Colin Fassnidge; Guy Grossi; Karen Martini	__
5	27 January 2014	29 April 2014	15	NSW	Cathy & Anna	Carly & Tresne	Uel & Shannelle	Annie & Jason			Pete Evans; Manu Feildel	Liz Egan; Colin Fassnidge; Guy Grossi; Karen Martini	__
5	27 January 2014	29 April 2014	15	QLD	Paul & Blair	David & Corinne					Pete Evans; Manu Feildel	Liz Egan; Colin Fassnidge; Guy Grossi; Karen Martini	__
5	27 January 2014	29 April 2014	15	SA	Bree & Jessica	Deb & Rick					Pete Evans; Manu Feildel	Liz Egan; Colin Fassnidge; Guy Grossi; Karen Martini	__
5	27 January 2014	29 April 2014	15	TAS	Thalia & Bianca						Pete Evans; Manu Feildel	Liz Egan; Colin Fassnidge; Guy Grossi; Karen Martini	__
5	27 January 2014	29 April 2014	15	VIC	Helena & Vikki	Josh & Danielle	Harry & Christo				Pete Evans; Manu Feildel	Liz Egan; Colin Fassnidge; Guy Grossi; Karen Martini	__
5	27 January 2014	29 April 2014	15	WA	Chloe & Kelly	Jess & Felix					Pete Evans; Manu Feildel	Liz Egan; Colin Fassnidge; Guy Grossi; Karen Martini	__
6	2 February 2015	4 May 2015	18	ACT	Gina & Anna						Pete Evans; Manu Feildel	Liz Egan; Colin Fassnidge; Guy Grossi; Karen Martini	__
6	2 February 2015	4 May 2015	18	NSW	Will & Steve	Carol & Adam	Robert & Lynzey	Katie & Nikki			Pete Evans; Manu Feildel	Liz Egan; Colin Fassnidge; Guy Grossi; Karen Martini	__
6	2 February 2015	4 May 2015	18	QLD	Jac & Shaz	Rob & Dave	Sheri & Emilie	Lynn & Tony			Pete Evans; Manu Feildel	Liz Egan; Colin Fassnidge; Guy Grossi; Karen Martini	__
6	2 February 2015	4 May 2015	18	SA	Vicky & Celine	Annie & Lloyd					Pete Evans; Manu Feildel	Liz Egan; Colin Fassnidge; Guy Grossi; Karen Martini	__
6	2 February 2015	4 May 2015	18	VIC	Ash & Camilla	Jane & Emma	Rose & Josh	Matt & Rob			Pete Evans; Manu Feildel	Liz Egan; Colin Fassnidge; Guy Grossi; Karen Martini	__
6	2 February 2015	4 May 2015	18	WA	Eva & Debra	Drasko & Bianca	Kat & Andre				Pete Evans; Manu Feildel	Liz Egan; Colin Fassnidge; Guy Grossi; Karen Martini	__
7	1 February 2016	26 April 2016	18	NSW	Chris & Cookie	Luciano & Martino	Monique & Sarah	Tim & Dee			Pete Evans; Manu Feildel	Liz Egan; Colin Fassnidge; Guy Grossi; Karen Martini	Rachel Khoo
7	1 February 2016	26 April 2016	18	QLD	Mike & Tarq	Alex & Gareth	JP & Nelly	Hazel & Lisa	Cheryl & Matt		Pete Evans; Manu Feildel	Liz Egan; Colin Fassnidge; Guy Grossi; Karen Martini	Rachel Khoo
7	1 February 2016	26 April 2016	18	SA	Carmine & Lauren	Rosie & Paige					Pete Evans; Manu Feildel	Liz Egan; Colin Fassnidge; Guy Grossi; Karen Martini	Rachel Khoo
7	1 February 2016	26 April 2016	18	VIC	Tasia & Gracia	Gianni & Zana	Mitch & Laura	Eve & Jason	Jessica & Marcos		Pete Evans; Manu Feildel	Liz Egan; Colin Fassnidge; Guy Grossi; Karen Martini	Rachel Khoo
7	1 February 2016	26 April 2016	18	WA	Anna & Jordan	Nev & Kell					Pete Evans; Manu Feildel	Liz Egan; Colin Fassnidge; Guy Grossi; Karen Martini	Rachel Khoo
8	30 January 2017	30 April 2017	18	NSW	David & Betty	Mell & Cyn	Kelsey & Amanda	Albert & Dave			Pete Evans; Manu Feildel	Liz Egan; Colin Fassnidge; Guy Grossi; Karen Martini	Darren Robertson; Curtis Stone
8	30 January 2017	30 April 2017	18	QLD	Amy & Tyson	Valerie & Courtney	Della & Tully	Brett & Marie	Alyse & Matt		Pete Evans; Manu Feildel	Liz Egan; Colin Fassnidge; Guy Grossi; Karen Martini	Darren Robertson; Curtis Stone
8	30 January 2017	30 April 2017	18	SA	Tim & Kyle	Lama & Sarah					Pete Evans; Manu Feildel	Liz Egan; Colin Fassnidge; Guy Grossi; Karen Martini	Darren Robertson; Curtis Stone
8	30 January 2017	30 April 2017	18	TAS	Damo & Caz						Pete Evans; Manu Feildel	Liz Egan; Colin Fassnidge; Guy Grossi; Karen Martini	Darren Robertson; Curtis Stone
8	30 January 2017	30 April 2017	18	VIC	Mark & Chris	Karen & Ros	Court & Duncan	Caitie & Demi			Pete Evans; Manu Feildel	Liz Egan; Colin Fassnidge; Guy Grossi; Karen Martini	Darren Robertson; Curtis Stone
8	30 January 2017	30 April 2017	18	WA	Josh & Amy	Bek & Ash					Pete Evans; Manu Feildel	Liz Egan; Colin Fassnidge; Guy Grossi; Karen Martini	Darren Robertson; Curtis Stone
9	29 January 2018	6 May 2018	16	NSW	Josh & Nic	Olga & Valeria	Jess & Emma	Sonya & Hadil	Georgie & Alicia	Pat & Louisa	Pete Evans; Manu Feildel	Liz Egan; Colin Fassnidge; Guy Grossi; Karen Martini	Curtis Stone
9	29 January 2018	6 May 2018	16	QLD	Alex & Emily	Matt & Aly	Stuss & Steve	Ash & Matty			Pete Evans; Manu Feildel	Liz Egan; Colin Fassnidge; Guy Grossi; Karen Martini	Curtis Stone
9	29 January 2018	6 May 2018	16	SA	Dan & Gemma						Pete Evans; Manu Feildel	Liz Egan; Colin Fassnidge; Guy Grossi; Karen Martini	Curtis Stone
9	29 January 2018	6 May 2018	16	TAS	Henry & Anna						Pete Evans; Manu Feildel	Liz Egan; Colin Fassnidge; Guy Grossi; Karen Martini	Curtis Stone
9	29 January 2018	6 May 2018	16	VIC	Kim & Suong	Roula & Rachael					Pete Evans; Manu Feildel	Liz Egan; Colin Fassnidge; Guy Grossi; Karen Martini	Curtis Stone
9	29 January 2018	6 May 2018	16	WA	Stella & Jazzey	Davide & Marco					Pete Evans; Manu Feildel	Liz Egan; Colin Fassnidge; Guy Grossi; Karen Martini	Curtis Stone
10	28 January 2019	28 April 2019	16	NSW	Matt & Luke	Ibby & Romel	Josh & Austin	Veronica & Piper	Stacey & Ash		Pete Evans; Manu Feildel	Liz Egan; Colin Fassnidge; Guy Grossi; Karen Martini	Rachel Khoo; Curtis Stone
10	28 January 2019	28 April 2019	16	QLD	Andy & Ruby	Chris & Lesley					Pete Evans; Manu Feildel	Liz Egan; Colin Fassnidge; Guy Grossi; Karen Martini	Rachel Khoo; Curtis Stone
10	28 January 2019	28 April 2019	16	SA	Lyn & Sal						Pete Evans; Manu Feildel	Liz Egan; Colin Fassnidge; Guy Grossi; Karen Martini	Rachel Khoo; Curtis Stone
10	28 January 2019	28 April 2019	16	VIC	Pat & Bianca	Victor & G	Mick & Jodie-Anne	Anne & Jennifer	Milly Hams		Pete Evans; Manu Feildel	Liz Egan; Colin Fassnidge; Guy Grossi; Karen Martini	Rachel Khoo; Curtis Stone
10	28 January 2019	28 April 2019	16	WA	Lisa & John	Amanda & Blake	Karolina Borkovic	Karito & Ian			Pete Evans; Manu Feildel	Liz Egan; Colin Fassnidge; Guy Grossi; Karen Martini	Rachel Khoo; Curtis Stone
11	2 February 2020	24 March 2020	10	NSW	Sophia & Romel						Pete Evans; Manu Feildel; Colin Fassnidge	—N/a	__
11	2 February 2020	24 March 2020	10	QLD	Jake & Elle	Dan & Steph	Kaylene McNee	Jac & Shaz	Jenni & Louise		Pete Evans; Manu Feildel; Colin Fassnidge	—N/a	__
11	2 February 2020	24 March 2020	10	VIC	Mark & Lauren	Sue Ann & Sylvia	Roula & Rachael	Ben & Vasil			Pete Evans; Manu Feildel; Colin Fassnidge	—N/a	__
11	2 February 2020	24 March 2020	10	WA	Kerry Hall						Pete Evans; Manu Feildel; Colin Fassnidge	—N/a	__
12	7 August 2022	31 August 2022	12	NSW	Janelle & Monzir	Sophie & Katherine	Arrnott & Fuzz				Manu Feildel; Nigella Lawson; Matt Preston	Colin Fassnidge; Curtis Stone	Gary Mehigan
12	7 August 2022	31 August 2022	12	QLD	Kate & Mary	Rosie & Hayley					Manu Feildel; Nigella Lawson; Matt Preston	Colin Fassnidge; Curtis Stone	Gary Mehigan
12	7 August 2022	31 August 2022	12	SA	Nicky & Jose	Steven & Frena					Manu Feildel; Nigella Lawson; Matt Preston	Colin Fassnidge; Curtis Stone	Gary Mehigan
12	7 August 2022	31 August 2022	12	VIC	Matt & KT	Leanne & Milena	Peter & Alice				Manu Feildel; Nigella Lawson; Matt Preston	Colin Fassnidge; Curtis Stone	Gary Mehigan
12	7 August 2022	31 August 2022	12	WA	Che & Dave	Ashlee & Mat					Manu Feildel; Nigella Lawson; Matt Preston	Colin Fassnidge; Curtis Stone	Gary Mehigan
13	4 September 2023	3 October 2023	9	NSW	Radha & Prabha	Aaron & Chris	Amber & Mel	Coco & Pearls			Manu Feildel; Colin Fassnidge	Nigella Lawson	_
13	4 September 2023	3 October 2023	9	QLD	Claudean & Anthony	Patricija & Brigita					Manu Feildel; Colin Fassnidge	Nigella Lawson	_
13	4 September 2023	3 October 2023	9	SA	Sonia & Marcus						Manu Feildel; Colin Fassnidge	Nigella Lawson	_
13	4 September 2023	3 October 2023	9	VIC	Nick & Christian						Manu Feildel; Colin Fassnidge	Nigella Lawson	_
13	4 September 2023	3 October 2023	9	WA	Tommy & Rach						Manu Feildel; Colin Fassnidge	Nigella Lawson	_
14	9 September 2024	19 November 2024	9	NSW	Caz & Fergus	Robert & Andrea					Manu Feildel; Colin Fassnidge	_	Julie Goodwin
14	9 September 2024	19 November 2024	9	QLD	Simone & Viviana	Danny & Sonia					Manu Feildel; Colin Fassnidge	_	Julie Goodwin
14	9 September 2024	19 November 2024	9	SA	Ash & Cassie						Manu Feildel; Colin Fassnidge	_	Julie Goodwin
14	9 September 2024	19 November 2024	9	VIC	Janey & Maddie	Rob & Liam					Manu Feildel; Colin Fassnidge	_	Julie Goodwin
14	9 September 2024	19 November 2024	9	WA	Mike & Pete	Hannah & Lawrence					Manu Feildel; Colin Fassnidge	_	Julie Goodwin
15	1 September 2025	16 November 2025	9	NSW	Justin & Will	Mel & Jacinta					Manu Feildel; Colin Fassnidge		
15	1 September 2025	16 November 2025	9	QLD	Lol & Lil	Michael & Rielli	Amy & Lara				Manu Feildel; Colin Fassnidge		
15	1 September 2025	16 November 2025	9	SA	Maria & Bailey	Mark & Tan					Manu Feildel; Colin Fassnidge		
15	1 September 2025	16 November 2025	9	VIC	Anne & Marie						Manu Feildel; Colin Fassnidge		
15	1 September 2025	16 November 2025	9	WA	Danielle & Marko						Manu Feildel; Colin Fassnidge		
16	28 September 2026	2026	TBD	NSW	Jane & Shane	Harrison & Oliver	Zoe & Zac				Manu Feildel; Colin Fassnidge		
16	28 September 2026	2026	TBD	QLD	Krysten & Lucy						Manu Feildel; Colin Fassnidge		
16	28 September 2026	2026	TBD	SA	Angus & Simon	Alisha & Deanne					Manu Feildel; Colin Fassnidge		
16	28 September 2026	2026	TBD	VIC	Tiffany & Giancarlo	Mary & Golden					Manu Feildel; Colin Fassnidge		
16	28 September 2026	2026	TBD	WA	Sheridan & Ted								

== Awards and nominations ==
The reality program has received nominations on the following awards:

Year	Award	Category	Result
2012	Logie Awards	Most Popular Reality Program	Nominated
2013	AACTA Awards	Best Reality Television Series (Season 3)	Nominated
2013	Logie Awards	Most Popular Reality Program	Nominated
2014	AACTA Awards	Best Reality Television Series (Season 4)	Nominated
2014	Logie Awards	Most Popular Reality Program	Won
2015	AACTA Awards	Best Reality Television Series (Season 6)	Nominated
2015	Logie Awards	Most Popular Reality Program	Nominated
2016	AACTA Awards	Best Reality Television Series (Season 7)	Nominated
2016	Logie Awards	Best Reality Program	Nominated
2017	Logie Awards	Best Reality Program	Nominated
2025	Logie Awards	Best Competition Reality Program	Nominated

== Ratings and viewership average ==
Seasonal television ratings on aggregate figures for My Kitchen Rules on free-to-air Seven Network channel were gathered from TV Tonight covering only the five city metro across Australia, namely: Adelaide, Brisbane, Melbourne, Perth, and Sydney until 2023. In 2024, the ratings system changed and now provides National Total viewership. The number of viewers presented in the table below are in millions.

Season	Premiere date	Finale date	Episodes	Premiere ratings	Rank	Finale ratings (Grand final)	Rank	Finale ratings (Winner announced)	Rank	Season average	Average rank	Ref.
1	1 February 2010	22 March 2010	15	1.103	#9	1.525	#1	—N/a		1.337	#4	
2	31 January 2011	13 April 2011	33	1.205	#5	1.719	#2	2.020	#1	1.426	#2	
3	30 January 2012	27 March 2012	37	1.484	#1	2.186	#2	2.675	#1	1.752	#1	
4	28 January 2013	28 April 2013	46	1.384	#3	2.154	#2	2.952	#1	1.835	#1	
5	27 January 2014	29 April 2014	48	1.774	#1	2.408	#2	2.712	#1	1.891	#1	
6	2 February 2015	4 May 2015	48	1.596	#1	2.082	#1	2.039	#2	1.561	#1	
7	1 February 2016	26 April 2016	48	1.576	#1	1.820	#2	1.969	#1	1.482	#1	
8	30 January 2017	30 April 2017	48	1.309	#1	1.392	#2	1.482	#1	1.187	#2	
9	29 January 2018	6 May 2018	49	1.182	#1	1.368	#2	1.543	#1	1.227	#2	
10	28 January 2019	28 April 2019	50	0.816	#6	0.873	#5	0.946	#4	0.796	#6	
11	2 February 2020	24 March 2020	29	0.498	#10	0.553	#17	—N/a		0.510	#15	
12	7 August 2022	31 August 2022	16	0.503	#8	0.528	#9	0.643	#6	0.449	#12	
13	4 September 2023	3 October 2023	15	0.470	#12	0.637	#7	—N/a		0.536	#8	
14	9 September 2024	19 November 2024	24	0.757	#4	1.129	#2	—N/a		0.919	#4	
15	1 September 2025	16 November 2025	24	0.817	#5	1.170	#1	—N/a		0.968	#5	
16	28 September 2026	2026		0.956	#4	TBA	#TBA	—N/a		TBA	#TBA	

== Criticism ==
Season 5 was criticised by angry viewers who set up a Facebook page to boycott the finale as they claimed the runner-up team "bullied other teams." The show faced continued accusations of promoting bullying behaviour in subsequent seasons. In season 9, a team was dismissed from the show for their antagonistic behaviour towards other contestants and for getting into a physical altercation with another team off-camera; the incident has been blamed as one of the reasons behind the show's drop in viewership in later seasons. In April 2021, Seven was ordered to pay former season 10 contestant Piper O'Neill workers' compensation for “psychological injury” she suffered from her time on the show due to "vilification and bullying from producers and the network."

Later seasons were also criticised by long-time viewers who lamented the show shifting to focus more on interpersonal drama instead of cooking. Seven later acknowledged this criticism of the program and have attempted to refocus the show away from personal drama following the show's return in 2022. During his tenure, the show also faced viewer consternation with the negative press garnered by former judge Pete Evans for his controversial lifestyle and dieting views that were sometimes at odds with the program.

In Season 15, viewers were critical of the perceived lack of hygienic cooking practices by contestants; with one contestant couple having been observed preparing meals with their hair untied, and serving a salad with their hands rather than with tongs.

The recent seasons of the show have also drawn criticism for a notable shift in contestant selection. The show, which originally built its reputation on showcasing the culinary skills of amateur home cooks, has increasingly featured professional chefs and restaurant owners. This change in format, combined with a perceived bias from the judging panel, has led to public debate regarding the show's fundamental premise. The inclusion of professional contestants, particularly when judged by figures like Manu Feildel, has prompted questions about whether the competition remains a fair platform for amateur talent or has instead compromised its original concept. As a result, observers have questioned the show's integrity and its adherence to the very premise that made it popular.

== International broadcast ==
Country	Network	Current broadcaster?	Ref.
Belgium	VTM2	Yes	
Bulgaria	24Kitchen	Yes	
Canada	Gusto TV	Yes	
Cyprus	Fox (Arabia) via Nile Sat	Yes	
Estonia	TV3	Yes	
France	NRJ12	Yes	
India	Colors Infinity	Yes	
Ireland	RTÉ One	Yes	
Israel	The Good Life Channel (as HaMitbakh HaMenatze'akh (lt. The Winning Kitchen)) which is carried by yes and HOT	Yes	
Italy	Sky Uno	Yes	
Latvia	LNT	Yes	
Latvia	TV3Life	No	
Lithuania	BTV	Yes	
Netherlands	NET 5	Yes	
New Zealand	TVNZ 2	Yes	
Philippines	Colours	No	
Portugal	Fox Life. SIC Mulher, +TVI	Yes	
Russia	Sony Entertainment Television	Yes	
Russia	You	Yes	
South Africa	M-Net	Yes	
Spain	Divinity (as En Mi Cocina Mando Yo)	Yes	
United Kingdom	Channel 4	Yes	

== International versions ==
=== Bulgaria ===
The Bulgarian version launch on bTV in 2026. The show is called Моята кухня е номер едно (English: My kitchen is number 1). The jury members are chefs Vladimir Todorov, Lyubomir Todorov, Lyuben Koychev and Pavel Pavlov.

=== Canada ===
From 2010–2013, a Québec's version of MKR was broadcast on Casa and TVA for 3 seasons, under the title of Ça va chauffer! (It Will Get Warmer!) with chefs Jonathan Garnier and Mathieu Cloutier.

Dinner Party Wars, was hosted/ judged by Corbin Tomaszeski (Canadian chef) and Anthea Turner (UK style and etiquette expert). The show had two seasons in 2017, based in Toronto, Ontario. Shown on Food Network Canada.

=== Israel ===
The show is produced in Israel by July August Productions for Keshet Media Group in October 2018, and is broadcast on its television channel Keshet 12, under the title of MKR The Winning Kitchen (Hebrew: MKR Hamitbakh HaMenatze'akh).

=== New Zealand ===
My Kitchen Rules NZ debuted in 2014 on TVNZ 1. The first season ended in October 2014, won by Waikato's Neena and Belinda. The second season ended in December 2015 and was won by Wellington's Jess and Stella. The third season began on 25 September 2017, hosted by Pete Evans and Manu Feildel.

=== Russia ===
A Russian version of MKR is broadcast on TV channel SONY SET TV. 10 seasons were shown.

=== Serbia ===
In Serbia, local production company Emotion Production purchased the format rights. The show is called Moja kuhinja, Moja pravila (English: My Kitchen, My Rules). The first series premiered in 2014 on B92.

=== South Africa ===
My Kitchen Rules SA premiered in South Africa on M-Net in 2017.

=== United Kingdom ===
Following the show's national and international ratings success in 2013, broadcaster Sky Living purchased the format rights to My Kitchen Rules for a United Kingdom version. The British franchise debuted on 25 January 2014, hosted by cook and author Lorraine Pascale and chef Jason Atherton.

A second British series aired on Channel 4 in September 2016, made up of 30 hour-long episodes, hosted by Prue Leith and Michael Caines and produced by 7 Wonder Productions, offering a £10,000 prize.

=== United States ===
In 2012, American-based production company Kinetic Content acquired the format rights for an American version of the show during the MIPTV Media Market event in Cannes, France. American TV network Fox has ordered 8 episodes of MKR featuring celebrities in their Hollywood homes with Curtis Stone & Cat Cora as series co-judges.

== See also ==
- List of Australian television series
- List of cooking shows
- MasterChef Australia
- Come Dine with Me Australia
