= Karen Martini =

Australian chef

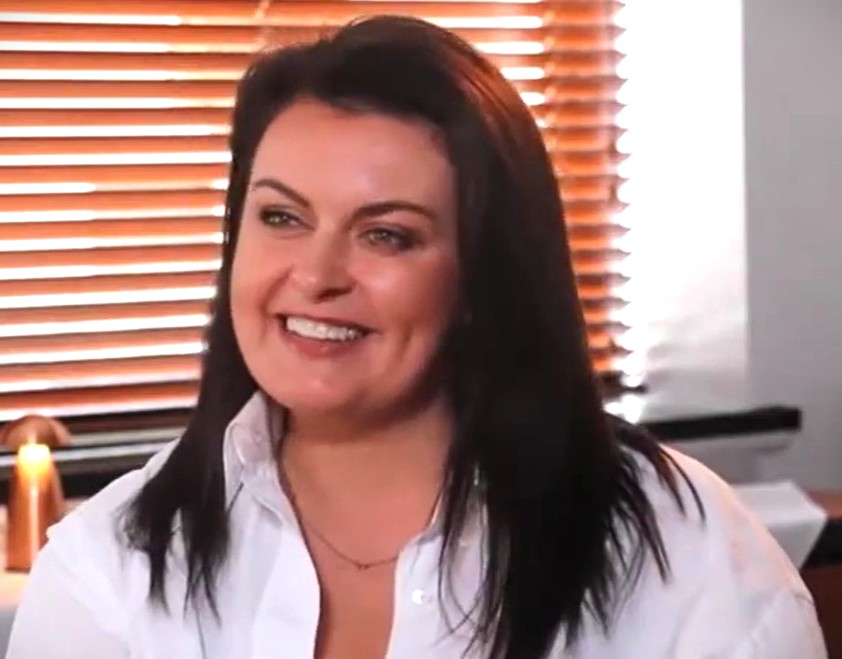
- Martini in 2017
- Born: 22 September 1971 (age 54); Melbourne, Victoria, Australia
- Occupation: Chef
- Known for: Television chef; restaurateur; columnist; author
- Notable work: Where the Heart Is; Karen Martini Cooking at Home
- Television: Better Homes and Gardens; My Kitchen Rules
- Spouse: Michael Sapountsis
- Children: 2
- Website: www.karenmartini.com

Karen Martini (born 22 September 1971) is an Australian chef, restaurateur, writer and television presenter.

Martini was born in Greensborough, Victoria. At 15 she undertook work experience at the restaurant Mietta's, where she watched the French-Australian chef Jacques Reymond cook, and did not return to school. She followed by learning classical skills from Tansy Good at her eponymous restaurant in Melbourne. In the nineties, Martini held positions at Haskin's and the Kent Hotel, before Melbourne Wine Room in St Kilda's George Hotel. Martini is married to Michael Sapountsis and has a daughter born in 2006.

She is best known for her television role as food chef on Better Homes and Gardens and Judge on My Kitchen Rules. In 2005 Martini was the resident chef on LifeStyle Cafe, a 13-part series on the LifeStyle Channel. She was also one of the chefs on Intolerant Cooks. On 23 January 2024, Martini announced that she would be leaving Better Homes and Gardens.

Martini ran a restaurant called Hero at the Australian Centre for the Moving Image in Melbourne from 2021 to 2023, when it was closed suddenly.

== See also ==
- "Great Australian Chefs - Karen Martini". miettas.com.au. 2003. Archived from the original on 6 July 2011.
