= Guy Grossi =

Australian chef and media personality (born 1965)

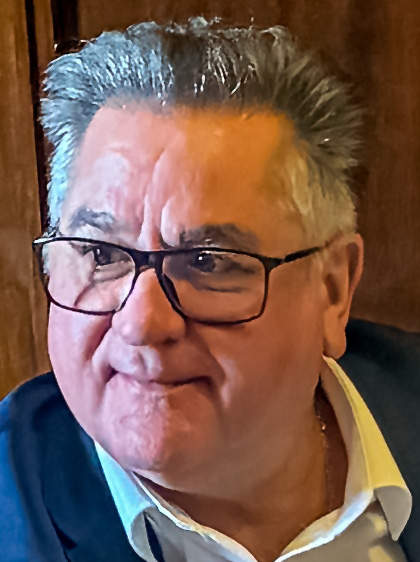
- Born: 13 May 1965 (age 61); Melbourne, Victoria
- Occupation: Chef
- Years active: 1996–present
- Children: 2

Guy Grossi (born 13 May 1965) is an Italian-Australian chef and media personality. He owns several restaurants in Melbourne.

In 1996, Grossi was awarded the L'insegna Del Ristorante Italiano by the president of Italy, for his dedication to presenting and promoting "La Cucina Italiana" and lifestyle. He has published four cookbooks: Grossi Florentino – Secrets and Recipes, My Italian Heart, Recipes From My Mother's Kitchen and most recently, Love Italy.

== Early life ==
Grossi was born in Melbourne, Australia, to Italian parents. His father came to Australia from Milan in 1960 to work as a chef at Mario's in Exhibition Street, Melbourne.

Grossi attended Dallas North Primary School before moving to Glenhuntly Primary, then Caulfield Technical School where he completed up to year 10.

== Professional career ==
In 1980, Grossi completed an apprenticeship in commercial cookery at the Box Hill Institute. At age fifteen, he began working in a Malvern seafood restaurant before progressing to Tolarno's, where his father led the kitchen. Later, he moved to Massoni's in Fitzroy Street, owned by his father, Leon Massoni, and David Gibson. Following a stint at Two Faces, he and his wife, Melissa, opened Quadri, a restaurant of their own in Armadale. Grossi's father Pietro joined them to open Caffé Grossi in 1988.

In 1999, Grossi purchased an Italian restaurant in Melbourne, known as The Florentino. Later, he purchased the Mirka Continental Bistro in St Kilda, Victoria, and had the building's murals restored by the original artist, Mirka Mora. The murals were first painted in the 1960s, when Mora and her husband Georges owned the Tolarno Hotel.

In 2009, Grossi opened the Grossi Trattoria and Wine Bar at the Intercontinental Hotel in Bangkok, Thailand. In 2010, he opened The Merchant in the Rialto Towers as a joint venture with Lorenz Grollo. In 2012, Grossi opened the Ombra Salumi Bar next to Grossi Florentino in central Melbourne.

== Media ==
Grossi has appeared on various Australian television programs including Industry Leaders, Food Safari, Iron Chef Australia, 9am with David and Kim, Fresh, Postcards, Getaway, Neighbours, My Kitchen Rules, A Current Affair, and Sunrise. He has also appeared on various American shows such as Good Day Philadelphia.

== Controversy ==
In January 2025, Guy Grossi apologised after allegedly groping a female journalist at an industry event in February 2022.

== Restaurants ==
=== Current ===
- Grossi Florentino, Melbourne
- Ombra Salumi Bar, Melbourne
- Merchant Osteria Veneta, Melbourne
- Garum, Perth
- Settimo, Brisbane

=== Former ===
- La Fontana Ristorante, 410 Main Road, Lower Plenty, Victoria until 1999
- Mirka at Tolarno Hotel, St Kilda, Victoria
- Grossi Trattoria and Wine Bar, Bangkok
- Café Grossi
- Quadri, Armadale, Victoria

== Publications ==
Grossi has written four books:

- Grossi, Guy (2007). Grossi Florentino – Secrets and Recipes. Australia: Penguin Random House. ISBN 9781920989712.
- Grossi, Guy (2011). My Italian Heart: Recipes from an Italian Kitchen. Australia: Penguin Random House. ISBN 9781921382673.
- Grossi, Guy (2012). Recipes from My Mother's Kitchen. Australia: Penguin Random House. ISBN 9781921382529.
- Grossi, Guy (2013). Love Italy. Australia: Penguin Random House. ISBN 9781921382420.
