= Pete Evans =

Australian conspiracy theorist

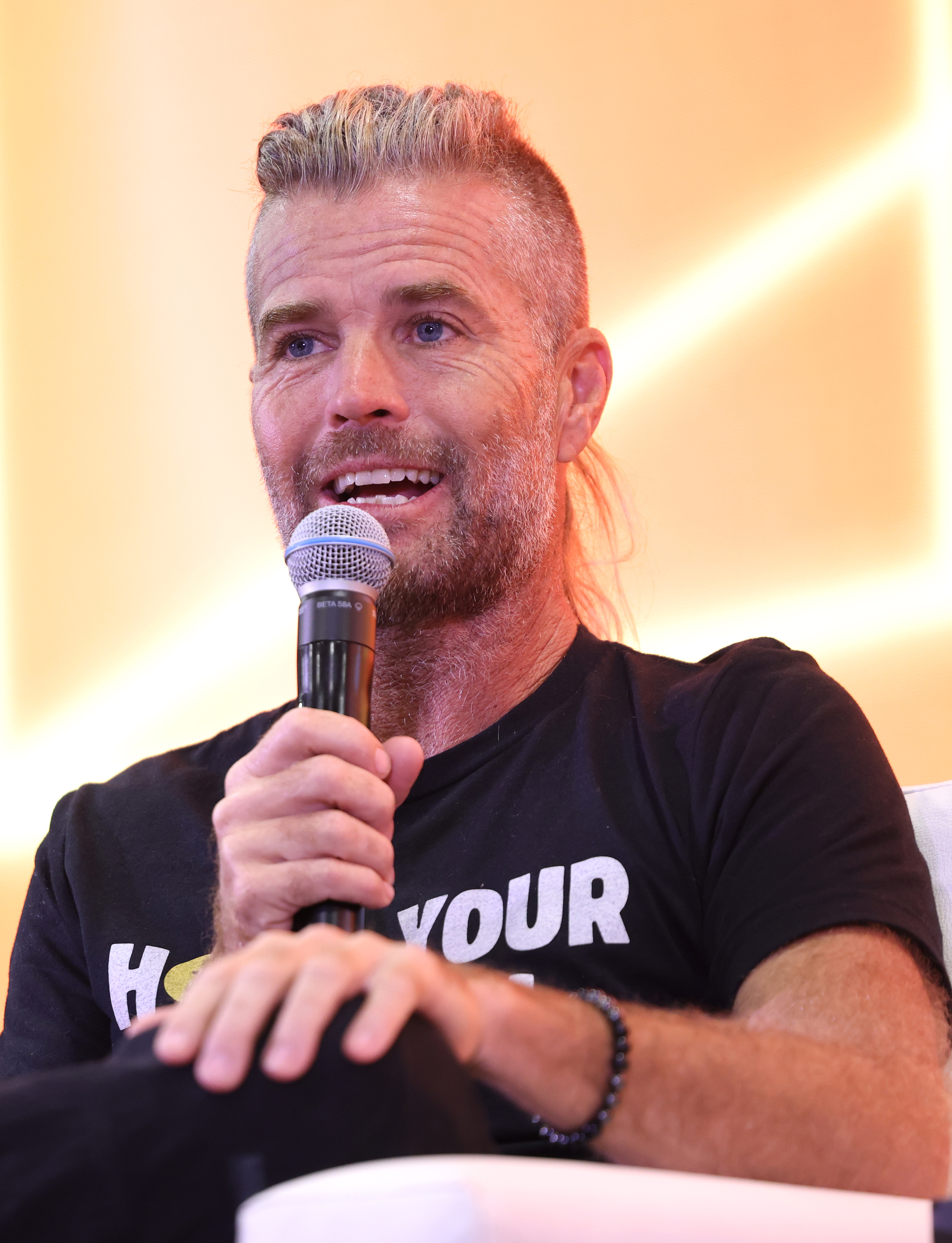
- Evans in 2025
- Born: Peter Daryl Evans; 29 August 1973 (age 53); Melbourne, Victoria, Australia
- Other name: Paleo Pete
- Occupations: Chef; restaurateur; author; television presenter
- Years active: 1993–present
- Known for: My Kitchen Rules
- Political party: The Great Australian Party
- Spouse: Nicola Robinson (m. 2016)
- Partner: Astrid Ellinger (2001–2011)
- Children: 2
- Website: peteevanschef.com

Peter Daryl Evans (born 29 August 1973) is an Australian chef and former television presenter who was a judge of the competitive Australian cooking show My Kitchen Rules. Evans has since been heavily criticised for spreading misinformation about vaccinations, and pseudoscientific dieting ideas such as the Paleolithic diet. He currently lives in Round Mountain, New South Wales.

== Early life ==
Born in Melbourne in 1973, Evans was only three when his parents split up, and seven when he and his mother moved to the Gold Coast. He was raised on the Gold Coast and attended Merrimac State High School throughout his teenage years as well as working his first job at McDonald's Mermaid Beach, which was coincidentally the first McDonald's restaurant to open in Queensland.

Evans developed a keen interest in surfing during his high school years on the Gold Coast and would ride his bike to the beach every morning to go surfing. His interest in cooking began in his early teenage years when he worked in a local pie shop on the Gold Coast and began a full-time cooking apprenticeship at the age of 17, which would lead to him relocating to Melbourne at the age of 19 for greater cooking opportunities.

He returned to the Gold Coast-Tweed area later in life and is based in the Northern Rivers where he has recently been involved with a paleo cafe in Burleigh Heads as well as a rainforest retreat in Byrrill Creek.

== Career ==
=== Restaurateur/chef ===
In 1996, Evans moved to Sydney with his brother and David Corsi and they opened Hugos Bondi in 1996, followed by Hugos Lounge in 2000 and Hugos Bar Pizza in 2004 (both in Sydney's Kings Cross) and Hugos Manly in 2008. Over 1998–2011, the restaurants in the Hugos Group were awarded eight Sydney Morning Herald 'Chef's Hats', 21 'Best in Australia' awards, and three 'Best pizza in Australia' awards at the Australian Fine Food Show. In 2005, Hugos won 'Best pizza in the world' at the American Pizza Challenge in New York City.

While visiting Australia for her Oprah's Ultimate Australian Adventure (2011), Oprah Winfrey sent her 'ultimate viewers' for a pizza-making and cocktail class with Evans at Hugos Bar Pizza. Evans has cooked at several events in the US as part of the annual G'Day USA: Australia Week promotion. In 2013 Pete Evans was involved in a venture with several business partners that were reported to owe $769,000 to a multitude of different creditors, including Evans himself. In 2014, Evans overhauled the menu at the CBD apartment hotel Fraser Suites in Perth in keeping with his paleo philosophy.

=== Television host ===
Beginning in 2010, Evans was a judge on the Australian Channel Seven TV kitchen game show My Kitchen Rules (MKR). with co-host Manu Feildel. The fourth series of MKR was shown in 2013. In 2014 the series won the Logie Award for the Most Popular Reality Program. Evans remained a judge on MKR throughout its run, which in 2015 was the highest rated reality television competition in Australia with about two million weekly viewers. Evans also hosted the show A Moveable Feast with Fine Cooking, which aired on PBS in the United States, which was nominated in 2014 for a Daytime Emmy Award. The show first aired in 2013, in which "Evans takes viewers on a faced-paced trip, serving pop-up feasts in a multitude of settings across America".

In 2017, Evans produced and narrated a Netflix documentary called The Magic Pill, which promoted the ketogenic diet, and claimed that it can help manage autism, asthma and cancer.

In May 2020, Evans' contract with Channel Seven was terminated after poor ratings from the eleventh season of My Kitchen Rules, and the TGA fining him A$25,000 for promoting a device he claimed could cure COVID-19. Channel Seven has not announced whether Evans would appear on the network in the future. Evans has stated he will now be focusing on his alternative lifestyle business.

=== Author ===
Evans had a monthly recipe column in The Australian Women's Weekly (2009–12) and has been a contributor to Selector magazine. In October 2012, Evans began a monthly recipe column for Home Beautiful. Evans has stated that the philosophy behind his books is that modern society is living by outdated nutritional precepts. Evans is also a motivational speaker, performing national tours in Australia. He first learned of the paleo-diet after reading the works of Nora Gedgaudas.

Some of his claims on fluoride and calcium have been challenged by the Australian Medical Association.

Evans has written the following books, most published by Murdoch Books:

- Fish (2007) ISBN 978-1-921208-58-4
- My Table (2008) ISBN 978-1-74196-240-6
- My Grill (2009) ISBN 978-1-74196-543-8
- My Party (2010) ISBN 978-1-74196-816-3
- My Kitchen (2011) ISBN 978-1-74196-828-6
- Pizza (2012) ISBN 978-1-74266-154-4
- Healthy Every Day (2014) ISBN 978-1-74261-389-5
- Easy Keto (2019) ISBN 9781760781811

== Criticisms ==
Evans' support and championing of various alternative medicines and "activated almonds" has attracted widespread criticism from peak medical bodies and intellectuals across Australia. In particular, his support for the paleo diet has brought about criticism from the public. Evans has stated that he completed an online course with the Institute for Integrative Nutrition, and describes himself as a "health coach" rather than a dietitian.

In 2015, Evans co-authored a cookbook titled Bubba Yum Yum: The Paleo Way for New Mums, Babies and Toddlers which raised significant controversy after being called "extremely deadly for all babies" by many qualified health experts. Despite this controversy, My Kitchen Rules broadcaster, the Seven Network, said that public reactions to the event were not a concern and supported Evans. Following the controversy, the authors made several changes to the book, but experts noted that the recipes in the new version were still potentially dangerous and unsuitable for babies.

Evans is the first person to win the Australian Skeptics' Bent Spoon Award twice. He most recently won the award in 2020 for the second time for his promotion of the pseudoscientific non-medical ‘BioCharger’ for treating COVID-19, and for his promotion of the anti-vaccination cause, through interviewing defrocked medico Andrew Wakefield to discuss his debunked suggestion of a link between vaccines and autism, and his support of the Informed Medical Options Party in the Queensland state election. He also won the award in 2015 for "his diet promotions, campaigns against fluoridation and support of anti-vaccinationists". A spokeswoman for the Seven Network defended Evans saying: "Pete is not anti-vaxx. His position on this, and more generally, is to further his own education on all topics regarding health."

In 2016, Evans gave advice to an osteoporosis sufferer on Facebook to stop eating dairy products. His claims that the "calcium from dairy can remove the calcium from your bones" and that "most doctors do not know about this" were widely condemned by medical professionals.

In 2018, Evans furthered his opposition to the use of sunscreens, and promoted brief and direct looks into the sun without any means of protection, during sunrise and sunsets, which drew widespread criticism as it can cause vision loss.

Evans is opposed to fluoridation of drinking water, and considers ingredients in many sunscreen products to be toxic.

High-profile Australian medical experts have warned the public about the grave dangers of following Evans' advice, including Michael Gannon (the president of the Australian Medical Association), Brad McKay (host of Embarrassing Bodies Down Under) and obstetrician Brad Robinson.

In 2019, Evans was again criticised by medical experts for fear-mongering and for spreading misinformation about vaccinations.

In early 2020, it was reported that Evans had been photographed with prominent anti-vaxxer Robert F. Kennedy Jr admiring his work as "important". General Practitioner Brad McKay said that "Pete Evans has peddled nonsense for years" and that the community "has tolerated his anti-science rantings for long enough" and that he is contributing to an "undermining of important public health efforts". The national president of the Royal Australian College of General Practitioners (RACGP), Harry Nespolon, also responded that "Pete Evans should stick to talking about 'activated almonds' and leave vaccinations alone", adding that the anti-vax movement is "intensely frustrating" and undermining gains made in improving public health.

Evans has complained that the various comments Nespolon made about him had subjected him to being "laughed at and ridiculed". After the president died due to pancreatic cancer, Evans quipped that Nespolon did not know how to "deal with" his illness, and wished the doctor had a chat with him beforehand. The RACGP called on Evans to retract his comments.

In May 2020, Evans received criticism from Australian Labor MP Josh Burns for promoting a video by conspiracy theorist David Icke which claimed both that the COVID-19 virus did not exist and that the virus was caused by 5G antenna installations. Burns wrote to Evans to warn him about promoting Icke's views because of Icke's history of antisemitism.

In October 2020, Evans claimed he had helped a number of people come through cancer by "looking through a holistic lens" and embracing both "modern and natural" medicine, and had also helped people "get off pharmaceutical drugs" and reversed terminal illnesses by using a "holistic approach".

In December 2020, Evans' public Facebook page was removed by Facebook for "repeated breaches of its misinformation and harm policies" regarding spreading significant misinformation about coronavirus. In February 2021, Facebook deleted his Instagram profile page also for COVID-19 misinformation breaches.

== Controversies ==
=== BioCharger NG ===
During the COVID-19 pandemic in 2020, Evans was criticised by peak Australian medical groups for attempting to promote a product claimed to cure COVID-19. Evans had been promoting a "subtle energy platform" product online called the BioCharger NG for AUD$15,000, which he claimed had a "recipe ... there for Wuhan coronavirus." The Australian Medical Association dismissed it as a "fancy light machine" and Mandy-Lee Noble, a dietician and member of Friends of Science in Medicine, said it "is a glorified plasma lamp," adding "it's probably no threat to people but if people think this in any way will treat or prevent COVID-19 infection, that risks our community response to the pandemic, that is dangerous, it's an indirect harm." Noble called on the TGA and Brad Hazzard (Health Minister in the New South Wales government) to take action. The TGA announced that it would investigate the product promoted by Evans "in relation to any illegal advertising of therapeutic products, including advertising on social media." Moreover, the TGA warned that the advertising of therapeutic goods needed to meet certain requirements. The creators of the product distanced themselves from Evans' claims, whilst the Australian distributors, Hydrogen Technologies Pty Ltd, continued to state that it would help "open the airways of Coronavirus victims by reducing the inflammation it causes in the lungs" as well as other therapeutic claims.

After investigation, the TGA issued two infringement notices to Peter Evans Chef Pty Ltd totalling AUD$25,200. The notices mentioned that the infringements were in "respect of the representation made in the live stream/video" and "advertising breaches on the website www.peteevans.com" where it was said the "BioCharger included claims such as: "proven to restore strength, stamina, co-ordination and mental clarity," "sharpening your mental clarity," "recovery ... from an injury, stress" and "accelerating muscle recovery and reducing stiffness in joints."

In May 2021, the TGA handed-down an $80,000 fine to Evans for repeated breaches.

=== Black Sun symbolism ===
The Black Sun symbol

In November 2020, Evans came under widespread criticism for sharing a picture online that incorporated the "Black Sun" on his social media platforms – a symbol widely used and embraced by neo-Nazis and white supremacists. This particular design was used by the Christchurch mosque shooter in his propaganda. This action eventually resulted in Evans being dropped by his long-term book publisher Pan Macmillan. Various major retailers such as Coles, Woolworths, Target, Kmart, Big W and Dymocks also ceased to continue stocking his products. Brand associations were also dropped with retailers Baccarat and House.

This controversy also resulted in Evans being dropped as an intended contestant on the popular survival television program season seven of Network 10's reality series, I'm a Celebrity...Get Me Out of Here!.

== Personal life ==
Evans has two daughters from his previous relationship with Astrid Ellinger. Evans previously lived in Sydney in the suburb of North Bondi before purchasing a $1.2 million farm in Round Mountain, northern New South Wales, in 2015. In 2016, Evans married model Nicola Robinson.
