= List of Australian television ratings for 2018 =

The following is a list of Australian television ratings for the year 2018.

== Network shares ==
Market	Network shares
Market	ABC	Seven	Nine	Ten	SBS
5 cities	17.0%	30.5%	27.4%	17.4%	7.7%
Sydney
Melbourne
Brisbane
Adelaide
Perth

== Most Watched Broadcasts in 2018 ==
Rank	Broadcast	Genre	Origin	Date	Network	Audience
1	2018 AFL Grant Final: Presentations	Sport	(Australia)	29 September 2018	7	2,616,000
2	2018 AFL Grand Final	Sport	(Australia)	29 September 2018	7	2,615,000
3	State of Origin (Rugby League) — Match 1	Sport	(Australia)	6 June 2018	9	2,347,000
4	2018 NRL Grand Final	Sport	(Australia)	30 September 2018	9	2,141,000
5	State of Origin (Rugby League) — Match 2	Sport	(Australia)	24 June 2018	9	2,132,000
6	The Block 2019 — Winner Announced	Reality	(Australia)	28 October 2018	9	2,093,000
7	2018 Commonwealth Games opening ceremony	Entertainment/Sport	(Australia)	4 April 2018	7	2,037,000
8	Royal Wedding of Prince Harry and Meghan Markle	Television special/Documentary	(United Kingdom)	19 May 2018	7	1,993,000
9	2018 Melbourne Cup Carnival — The Races	Sport	(Australia)	16 November 2018	7	1,908,000
10	Married At First Sight — Finale	Reality	(Australia)	21 March 2018	9	1,900,000
11	2018 AFL Grand Final — On The Ground	Sport	(Australia)	29 September 2018	7	1,831,000
12	Royal Wedding of Prince Harry and Meghan Markle — Arrivals	Television Special/Documentary	(Australia)	19 May 2018	7	1,722,000
13	State of Origin (Rugby League) — Match 3	Sport	(Australia)	11 July 2018	9	1,769,000
14	Married At First Sight — Final Dinner Party	Reality	(Australia)	20 March 2018	9	1,760,000
15	2018 AFL Grand Final — Post Match	Sport	(Australia)	29 September 2018	7	1,750,000
16	2018 Australian Open — Men's Final	Sport	(Australia)	28 January 2018	7	1,739,000
17	My Kitchen Rules	Reality	(Australia)	18 April 2018	7	1,738,000
18	The Block 2019 — Grand Final	Reality	(Australia)	28 October 2018	9	1,735,000
19	2018 FIFA World Cup (Soccer) — France vs. Australia	Sport	(Australia)	16 June 2018	SBS	1,667,000
20	2018 FIFA World Cup (Soccer) — Denmark vs. Australia	Sport	(Australia)	21 June 2018	SBS	1,664,000

== See also ==
- Television ratings in Australia
