= My Kitchen Rules series 10 =

My Kitchen Rules: 10th Anniversary Season
- Series 10
- No. of episodes: 50

Release
- Original network: Seven Network
- Original release: 28 January – 28 April 2019

Season chronology
- ← Previous; Series 9 (2018) Next → Series 11 (2020)

The tenth season of the Australian competitive cooking competition My Kitchen Rules, titled 10th Anniversary Season, premiered on the Seven Network on Monday 28 January 2019.

Before this series aired, The Best of MKR was shown depicting MKR's journey over the years

Applications for contestants opened during the airing of the ninth season. Pete Evans and Manu Feildel returned as judges, with Colin Fassnidge acting as a judge/mentor in the challenge/elimination rounds.

== Format Changes ==
- MKR Restaurant – The previous Kitchen Headquarters has been replaced with an MKR restaurant, featuring two kitchens and a dining area. It is used for all head-to-head Sudden Death Cook-Offs and the Finals.
- Perfect Strangers – Milly and Karolina are the first two people that haven't known each other before working as a team.
- Pop Up Restaurants - Groups will go on separate challenge like Season 9 from Top 13 to Top 11. Each time for the challenge, teams will cook for Pete, Colin, the other group and the public. The team that has the most score from the public receive People's Choice and get advantage in the scoring of the Sudden Death, while Pete and Colin will choose the weakest team to go to Sudden Death.
- Open Houses – From Top 10, two teams from each group will work together to make a three-course meal for Pete, Manu, the teams and the public. At the end of this round, the two teams that have the lowest score will compete against each other in a Sudden Death Cook-Off.
- New Quarterfinal - In the first three quarterfinals, instead of cooking food just for the judges, contestants have to serve for the public, VIPs, contestants from past seasons, kids and adults in the MKR Restaurant. The team with the highest score will progress to the semi-finals.
- Triple Elimination Quarterfinal - For the first time, three teams will be eliminated from the competition in the last quarterfinal.
- Judges on the Grand Finale - Instead of having six judges to score the dishes, a total of ten judges will be present, including the six judges in the semifinals and Guy Turland, Shannon Martinez, Sean Connoly and Rachel Khoo.

== Teams ==
Home/State			Group	Members	Relationship	Status
Newcastle	NSW		2	Matt & Luke	Cricket Mates	Winners 28 April (Grand Finale)
Sydney	NSW		1	Ibby & Romel	Socialites	Runners-up 28 April (Grand Finale)
Brisbane	QLD		1	Andrea & Ruby	Passionate Peruvians	Eliminated 23 April (Semi-Final 2)
Melbourne	VIC		2	Pat & Bianca	Frenemies	Eliminated 22 April (Semi-Final 1)
Margaret River	WA		2	Lisa & John	Mother and Son	Eliminated 21 April (Top 5 - Quarterfinal 4: Round 2)
Sydney	NSW		1	Josh & Austin	Home Schooled Brothers	Eliminated 21 April (Top 6 - Quarterfinal 4: Round 2)
Melbourne	VIC		2	Victor & Girish	Barmen	Eliminated 21 April (Top 7 - Quarterfinal 4: Round 1)
Sydney	NSW		2	Veronica & Piper O'Neill	Beauty Queens	Eliminated 10 April (Top 8: UIR)
Port Pirie	SA		2	Lyn & Sal	Fabulous Friends	Eliminated 27 March (Top 9)
Torrumbarry	VIC		1	Mick & Jodie-Anne	Hubby & Wife	Eliminated 20 March (Top 10)
Perth	WA		1	Amanda & Blake	Sister and Brother	Eliminated 11 March (Top 11)
Byron Bay	NSW		1	Stacey & Ash	Recently Engaged	Withdrew 6 March (Top 12)
Melbourne	VIC		2	Anne & Jennifer	Psychic and Cougar	Eliminated 5 March (Top 13)
Noosa	QLD		1	Chris & Lesley	Flight Attendants	Eliminated 27 February (Top 14)
Melbourne/Perth	VIC	WA	2	Milly & Karolina	Perfect Strangers	Eliminated 26 February (IR: Round 2)
Perth	WA		1	Karito & Ian	Married Couple	Eliminated 11 February (IR: Round 1)

== Elimination history ==
Teams' Competition Progress
Round:	Instant Restaurants				Top 14	Top 13	Top 12 → Top 11	Top 10		Top 9				Top 8	Top 7 - Quarterfinals					Semi-Finals		Grand Finale
Round:	1		2		Top 14	Top 13	Top 12 → Top 11	Open Houses	SD	Biscuit	Beer	Feast	SD	Top 8	1	2	3	4		1	2	Grand Finale
Teams:	Progress																					
Matt & Luke	—N/a		6th (69)	→	Safe	Safe	Safe	4th (108)	→	Safe	Safe	People's; Choice	→	2nd (94)	→ (26)	Win (39)	—N/a			—N/a	1st (59)	Winners (92)
Ibby & Romel	2nd (109)	→	—N/a		SD; Safe	People's; Choice	Safe	1st (136)	→	Safe	People's; Choice	—N/a	→	1st (111)	Win (28)	—N/a				1st (48)	—N/a	Runners-up (88)
Andy & Ruby	1st (110)	→	—N/a		SD; Safe	Safe	People's; Choice	2nd (123)	→	Safe	Safe	Safe	→	5th (86)	→ (18)	→ (34)	→ (22)	→ (20)	Win (29)	—N/a	2nd (57)	Eliminated (Episode 49)
Pat & Bianca	—N/a		4th (91)	→	Safe	Safe	Safe	4th (108)	→	Safe	Safe	Safe	→	4th (87)	→ (15)	→ (37)	Win (28)	—N/a		2nd (42)	Eliminated (Episode 48)	
Lisa & John	—N/a		1st (117)	→	Safe	Safe	People's; Choice	2nd (123)	→	Safe	Safe	Safe	→	6th (83)	→ (16)	→ (37)	→ (22)	→ (17)	Lose (27)	Eliminated (Episode 47)		
Josh & Austin	8th (31)	SD (90)	—N/a		SD; Safe	Safe	Safe	3rd (118)	→	Safe	Safe	Safe	→	7th (63)	→ (21)	→ (27)	→ (25)	→ (15)	Lose (25)	Eliminated (Episode 47)		
Victor & G	—N/a		5th (71)	→	Safe	People's; Choice	Safe	1st (136)	→	Safe	Lose	—N/a	SD (105)	3rd (90)	→ (22)	→ (27)	→ (21)	Lose (13)	Eliminated (Episode 47)			
Veronica & Piper	—N/a		8th (64)	SD (82)	Safe	Safe	Safe	3rd (118)	→	Penalty	Safe	Safe	→	8th (59)	Eliminated (Episode 43)							
Lyn & Sal	—N/a		2nd (105)	→	Safe	Safe	SD (132)	5th (74)	SD (96)	People's; Choice	Safe	Lose	SD (104)	Eliminated (Episode 35)								
Mick & Jodie-Anne	6th (45)	→	—N/a		SD; Safe	SD (125)	Safe	5th (74)	SD (70)	Eliminated (Episode 31)												
Amanda & Blake	3rd (96)	→	—N/a		SD; Safe	Safe	SD (102)	Eliminated (Episode 25)														
Stacey & Ash	5th (71)	→	—N/a		SD; Safe	Safe	Withdrew (Episode 23)															
Anne & Jennifer	—N/a		3rd (95)	→	Safe	SD (114)	Eliminated (Episode 22)															
Chris & Lesley	4th (82)	→	—N/a		SD; Lose	Eliminated (Episode 19)																
Milly & Karolina	—N/a		7th (66)	SD (69)	Eliminated (Episode 18)																	
Karito & Ian	7th (38)	SD (84)	Eliminated (Episode 9)																			

Cell Descriptions
Group 1	Team competed as part of Group 1 in the Instant Restaurants and rounds from Top 14 to Top 9.
Group 2	Team competed as part of Group 2 in the Instant Restaurants and rounds from Top 14 to Top 9.
	Team won a challenge, People's Choice, cooked the best dish or received the highest score for the round.
	Team is immune and safe from elimination after winning a previous challenge.
	Team lost a challenge, cooked the weakest dish, received a low score and must compete in an additional round or challenge or received a penalty.
Safe	Team was safe from elimination after passing a challenge/round.
→	Team continued to next the challenge/round.
SD	Team competed in a Sudden Death Cook-Off and became safe from elimination.
SD	Team was eliminated after losing in a Sudden Death Cook

== Competition details ==
=== Instant Restaurants ===
During the Instant Restaurant rounds, each team hosts a three-course dinner for judges and fellow teams in their allocated group. They are scored and ranked among their group, with the two lowest scoring teams sent to the Sudden Death Cook-Off at the MKR restaurant, with a risk of being eliminated.

==== Round 1 ====
- Episodes 1 to 8
- Airdate — 28 January to 10 February
- Description — The first of the two instant restaurant groups are introduced into the competition in Round 1. The two lowest scoring teams at the end of the round will go to the Sudden Death Cook-Off at the MKR restaurant, with a risk of being eliminated.

Instant Restaurant Summary
Group 1
Team and Episode Details		Guest Scores								Pete's Scores			Manu's Scores			Total (out of 130)	Rank	Result
Team and Episode Details		S&A	A&B	K&I	C&L	A&R	M&J	I&R	J&A	Entrée	Main	Dessert	Entrée	Main	Dessert	Total (out of 130)	Rank	Result
NSW	Stacey & Ash	-	6	6	6	5	6	3	6	6	7	3	7	7	3	71	5th	Safe
Ep 1	28 January	Staché																Safe
Dishes	Entrée	Tuna Tartare with Wasabi Mayo																Safe
Dishes	Main	Miso Salmon with Black Rice, Avocado & Radish Salad																Safe
Dishes	Dessert	Chocolate Avocado Mousse with Almond Praline																Safe
WA	Amanda & Blake	8	-	6	8	7	8	5	6	7	10	7	7	10	7	96	3rd	Safe
Ep 2	29 January	Proudy Shore																Safe
Dishes	Entrée	Crocodile Dumplings with Spicy Plum Sauce																Safe
Dishes	Main	Pork Belly with Braised Fennel, Mashed Potato and Juniper Sauce																Safe
Dishes	Dessert	Sunny Side Up Toast																Safe
WA	Karito & Ian	2	4	-	3	4	2	2	3	5	2	1	6	3	1	38	7th	Through to Sudden Death
Ep 3	30 January	Carnavalombia																Through to Sudden Death
Dishes	Entrée	Papa Rellena																Through to Sudden Death
Dishes	Main	Estofado de Res con Platano																Through to Sudden Death
Dishes	Dessert	Suspiro Limeño																Through to Sudden Death
QLD	Chris & Lesley	5	5	6	-	6	7	5	6	10	3	8	10	4	7	82	4th	Safe
Ep 4	3 February	Riviera Jet Set																Safe
Dishes	Entrée	Lobster & Herb Tortellini with Burnt Butter Sauce																Safe
Dishes	Main	Braised Rabbit & Prunes with Goats Cheese Custard and Baby Carrots																Safe
Dishes	Dessert	Campari & Orange Cake																Safe
QLD	Andy & Ruby	9	6	8	7	-	8	8	9	10	8	10	9	8	10	110	1st	Safe
Ep 5	4 February	Pachamama																Safe
Dishes	Entrée	Scallop & Fish Tiradito																Safe
Dishes	Main	Arroz con Pato																Safe
Dishes	Dessert	Alfajores con Helado de Lucuma																Safe
VIC	Mick & Jodie-Anne	3	5	3	5	3	-	4	2	1	3	5	2	3	6	45	6th	Safe
Ep 6	5 February	Port & Weir																Safe
Dishes	Entrée	Chicken Liver Pâté with Raspberry Jelly																Safe
Dishes	Main	Beef Wellington																Safe
Dishes	Dessert	Pear & Almond Cake with Smoked Cream																Safe
NSW	Ibby & Romel	6	8	9	8	7	8	-	8	10	7	10	10	8	10	109	2nd	Safe
Ep 7	6 February	Najah																Safe
Dishes	Entrée	Lebanese Shawarma																Safe
Dishes	Main	Snapper Sayadieh																Safe
Dishes	Dessert	White Chocolate Sahlab Muhalabieh																Safe
NSW	Josh & Austin	2	2	1	3	3	2	1	-	2	1	4	4	1	5	31	8th	Through to Sudden Death
Ep 8	10 February	Armageddon Fed																Through to Sudden Death
Dishes	Entrée	Clam Chowder with Homemade Bread																Through to Sudden Death
Dishes	Main	Heart Stopper Chicken Lollipops with Garlic Mash																Through to Sudden Death
Dishes	Dessert	Lemon Curd Domes																Through to Sudden Death

==== Sudden Death Cook-Off (Group 1) ====
- Episode 9
- Airdate — 11 February
- Description — Being the two bottom scoring teams from Round 1, Josh & Austin and Karito & Ian will face off in a Sudden Death Cook-Off. The lower scoring team is eliminated. The Sudden Death Cook-Off is held in the MKR Restaurant with seven new Group 2 teams invited as the guests and jury.

Sudden Death Cook-Off Results
Sudden Death Cook-Off 1
Team		Guest Score (out of 70)	Pete's Scores			Manu's Scores			Total (out of 130)	Result
Team		Guest Score (out of 70)	Entrée	Main	Dessert	Entrée	Main	Dessert	Total (out of 130)	Result
NSW	Josh & Austin	47	7	7	8	6	7	8	90	Safe
Dishes	Entrée	Beetroot and Goats’ Cheese Stacks								Safe
Dishes	Main	Jambalaya and Cornbread								Safe
Dishes	Dessert	Sweet Potato Pie with Vanilla Cream								Safe
WA	Karito & Ian	40	7	6	9	6	7	9	84	Eliminated
Dishes	Entrée	Beef Empanadas								Eliminated
Dishes	Main	Frijoles Colombiano con Arroz								Eliminated
Dishes	Dessert	Lemon Slice								Eliminated

==== Round 2 ====
- Episodes 10 to 17
- Airdate — 12 February to 25 February
- Description — The second group now start their instant restaurant round. The same rules from the previous round apply and the two lowest scoring teams will go to the Sudden Death Cook-Off at the MKR restaurant, with a risk of being eliminated.

Instant Restaurant Summary
Group 2
Team and Episode Details			Guest Scores								Pete's Scores			Manu's Scores			Total (out of 130)	Rank	Result
Team and Episode Details			L&J	V&G	P&B	A&J	L&S	M&L	V&P	M&K	Entrée	Main	Dessert	Entrée	Main	Dessert	Total (out of 130)	Rank	Result
WA		Lisa & John	-	9	7	8	8	9	9	7	10	10	10	10	10	10	117	1st	Safe
Ep 10		12 February	The Tasting Room																Safe
Dishes		Entrée	Seafood Cocktail																Safe
Dishes		Main	Braised Lamb Shanks and Mash																Safe
Dishes		Dessert	Raspberry Cheesecake																Safe
VIC		Victor & G	6	-	4	5	6	6	4	5	2	9	7	4	9	4	71	5th	Safe
Ep 11		13 February	Chí																Safe
Dishes		Entrée	Indian Fondue with Idli Dippers and Red Pepper Mole																Safe
Dishes		Main	Bak Kut Teh with Wild Rice and Youtiao																Safe
Dishes		Dessert	Indian Cheese Soufflé with Quince Sorbet																Safe
VIC		Pat & Bianca	8	8	-	5	7	8	6	6	10	5	7	9	5	7	91	4th	Safe
Ep 12		17 February	Harlequin																Safe
Dishes		Entrée	Italian Mussels with Homemade Bread																Safe
Dishes		Main	Pea Pesto Gnocchi with Roasted Walnuts																Safe
Dishes		Dessert	Tiramisu Chocolate Bowl																Safe
VIC		Anne & Jennifer	7	9	7	-	6	7	7	6	4	9	10	5	8	10	95	3rd	Safe
Ep 13		18 February	Mystic Temptress																Safe
Dishes		Entrée	Caramelised Red Onion & Goats Cheese Tart																Safe
Dishes		Main	Coq au Vin																Safe
Dishes		Dessert	Sticky Date Pudding																Safe
SA		Lyn & Sal	8	9	7	7	-	8	9	8	10	10	5	10	9	5	105	2nd	Safe
Ep 14		19 February	Sea of White																Safe
Dishes		Entrée	Veal Carpaccio with Grissini																Safe
Dishes		Main	Seafood Risotto																Safe
Dishes		Dessert	Black Magic Cherry Cake																Safe
NSW		Matt & Luke	5	7	3	4	5	-	4	5	5	9	3	5	9	5	69	6th	Safe
Ep 15		20 February	Powerplay																Safe
Dishes		Entrée	Seared Scallops with Pea Purée, Chorizo and Parsnip Crisps																Safe
Dishes		Main	Kangaroo with Spiced Carrot Purée, Cauliflower and Red Wine Jus																Safe
Dishes		Dessert	Peanut Butter Mousse																Safe
NSW		Veronica & Piper	5	5	3	4	4	3	-	5	7	2	8	7	2	9	64	8th	Through to Sudden Death
Ep 16		24 February	Fit For A Queen																Through to Sudden Death
Dishes		Entrée	Smoked Cod Croquettes with Sauce Gribiche																Through to Sudden Death
Dishes		Main	Scotch Fillet with Quinoa Salad and Gremolata																Through to Sudden Death
Dishes		Dessert	Poached Pear with Zabaglione																Through to Sudden Death
VIC	WA	Milly & Karolina	5	7	4	4	4	3	5	-	2	8	7	1	7	9	66	7th	Through to Sudden Death
Ep 17		25 February	Synergy																Through to Sudden Death
Dishes		Entrée	Pork Balls with Chilli Sauce																Through to Sudden Death
Dishes		Main	Master Stock Duck with Oyster Mushroom Jaew and Orange Nahm Jim																Through to Sudden Death
Dishes		Dessert	Rhubarb and Custard with Lemon Meringue																Through to Sudden Death

==== Sudden Death Cook-Off (Group 2) ====
- Episode 18
- Airdate — 26 February
- Description — Being the two lowest scoring teams from Round 2, Milly & Karolina and Veronica & Piper will face off in the second Sudden Death Cook-Off at the MKR restaurant. The lower scoring team is eliminated. The seven remaining Group 1 teams are invited as the guests and jury.

Sudden Death Cook-Off Results
Sudden Death Cook-Off 2
Team			Guest Score (out of 70)	Pete's Scores			Manu's Scores			Total (out of 130)	Result
Team			Guest Score (out of 70)	Entrée	Main	Dessert	Entrée	Main	Dessert	Total (out of 130)	Result
NSW		Veronica & Piper	45	7	5	6	7	6	6	82	Safe
Dishes		Entrée	Seared Scallops with Corn Purée and Crispy Potato								Safe
Dishes		Main	Lamb Cutlets with Spiced Couscous and Pickled Onions								Safe
Dishes		Dessert	Chocolate Flan								Safe
VIC	WA	Milly & Karolina	37	7	7	2	7	7	2	69	Eliminated
Dishes		Entrée	Swordfish with Agrodolce Sauce								Eliminated
Dishes		Main	Short Ribs with Sesame & Chipotle Sauce								Eliminated
Dishes		Dessert	Traditional Trifle								Eliminated

=== Top 14 ===
==== Elimination Challenge ====
- Episode 19
- Airdate — 27 February
- Description — All teams headed into the first challenge in a Group 1 vs Group 2 cook-off. In the first round, both groups nominated one team to cook a good (but not perfect) dish from a previous season. The winning team saved their entire group from elimination. The losing team and their group then faced off individually in a Sudden Death Cook-Off, tasked to create a dish that received a perfect score from a previous season. The team with the worst dish judged by Pete and Colin was eliminated.

Challenge Summary
Team		Dish	Original Team	Result
Round 1
NSW	Matt & Luke	Smoked Venison	Mitch & Laura (Series 7)	Win (Group 2 Safe)
VIC	Mick & Jodie-Anne	Smoked Venison	Mitch & Laura (Series 7)	Lose (Group 1 to Sudden Death)
Sudden Death: 10 Out of 10
QLD	Andy & Ruby	Squid Wraps with Tomato Salad	Helena & Vikki (Series 5)	Safe
NSW	Ibby & Romel	Lamb Backstrap with Pumpkin Hummus and Charred Brussels Sprouts	Will & Steve (Series 6)	Safe
NSW	Stacey & Ash	Spiced Kangaroo with Beetroot, Walnut Purée and Weed Salad	Tim & Kyle (Series 8)	Safe
NSW	Josh & Austin	Tuna Ceviche with Puffed Wild Rice, Avocado Purée and Wasabi Mayonnaise	Tim & Kyle (Series 8)	Safe
VIC	Mick & Jodie-Anne	Scallops with Wilted Bitter Greens and Stilton Dressing	Bree & Jessica (Series 5)	Safe
WA	Amanda & Blake	Quail Legs with Ranch Dressing and Jalapeño Poppers	Robert & Lynzey (Series 6)	Safe
QLD	Chris & Lesley	Fettuccine con Salsiccia & Funghi Porcini	Luciano & Martino (Series 7)	Eliminated

=== Top 13 ===
==== Group 2: Diner Challenge ====
- Episode 20
- Airdate - 3 March
- Guest Mentor - Shannon Martinez
- Description - Teams from Group 2 cooked and served diner-style dishes at Archie Brothers Cirque Electriq. Guests and teams from Group 1 were invited to taste the food and score the dish(es) out of 10. The team that performed best (determined by scores given) would be given a scoring advantage at the Sudden Death Cook-Off. The weakest team as determined by Pete and Colin would be sent to Sudden Death and the MKR Restaurant.

Challenge Summary
Team		Dish	Result
VIC	Victor & G	Bourbon Buttered Apple Crumble	People's Choice
NSW	Matt & Luke	Southern Fried Chicken with Grilled Corn and Coleslaw	Safe
WA	Lisa & John	Chili Con Carne Nachos	Safe
SA	Lyn & Sal	Italian Burger	Safe
VIC	Pat & Bianca	Fried Chicken and Waffles	Safe
NSW	Veronica & Piper	B.L.T.A.T with Steak Fries	Safe
VIC	Anne & Jennifer	Blueberry Pancakes with Maple Cream and Candied Pecans	Through to Sudden Death

==== Group 1: Brunch Challenge ====
- Episode 21
- Airdate - 4 March
- Guest Mentor - Guy Turland
- Description - Teams from Group 1 cooked and served brunch-style dishes at Bondi Surf Life Bathers Club. Guests and teams from Group 2 were invited to taste the food and score the dish(es) out of 10. The team that performed best (determined by scores given) would be given a scoring advantage at the Sudden Death Cook-Off. The weakest team as determined by Pete and Colin would be sent to Sudden Death and the MKR Restaurant.

Challenge Summary
Team		Dish	Result
NSW	Ibby & Romel	Lemon and White Chocolate Baked Pancakes with Sour Cherry Sauce	People's Choice
QLD	Andy & Ruby	Smoked Salmon Tostada with Mexican Salad	Safe
NSW	Josh & Austin	Waffle BLT with Caribbean Slaw	Safe
NSW	Stacey & Ash	Choc Peanut Butter Protein Bowl	Safe
WA	Amanda & Blake	Quinoa Breakfast Bowl	Safe
VIC	Mick & Jodie-Anne	Savoury French Toast	Through to Sudden Death

==== Sudden Death Cook-Off (Group Challenge 1) ====
- Episode 22
- Airdate — 5 March
- Description — Anne & Jennifer and Mick & Jodie-Anne were the weakest teams in the group challenges, will face off in a Sudden Death Cook-Off at Elimination House, where one team is eliminated. All guest teams score both meals out of 10. Victor & G and Ibby & Romel, as People's Choice winners, had the advantage of having each team member score both meals, meaning their scores would be doubled. Judges Pete and Manu scored each dish out of 10. Ibby & Romel were explicit in strategic voting giving 1 for the group two and 10 for group 1.

Sudden Death Cook-Off Results
Sudden Death Cook-Off 3
Team		Guest Score (out of 120)	Pete's Scores			Manu's Scores			Total (out of 180)	Result
Team		Guest Score (out of 120)	Entrée	Main	Dessert	Entrée	Main	Dessert	Total (out of 180)	Result
VIC	Mick & Jodie-Anne	85	6	6	8	6	6	8	125	Safe
Dishes	Entrée	Lamb Cutlets with Plum and Pepperberry Dipping Sauce								Safe
Dishes	Main	Beef Eye Fillets with Sriracha Butter and Ginger Miso Broccolini								Safe
Dishes	Dessert	Blue Cheese Ice-Cream with Drunken Muscatels								Safe
VIC	Anne & Jennifer	72	7	7	8	6	6	8	114	Eliminated
Dishes	Entrée	Salt and Pepper Calamari								Eliminated
Dishes	Main	Meatloaf with Tomato Relish								Eliminated
Dishes	Dessert	Chocolate Lava Cake								Eliminated

=== Top 12 → Top 11 ===
==== Group 1: Farmers Challenge ====
- Episode 23
- Airdate — 6 March
- Guest Mentor - Curtis Stone
- Description — Teams from Group 1 were asked to make a sophisticated, fine dining dish, showcasing beautiful farm produce for Australian farmers. Guests and teams from Group 2 were invited to taste the food and score the dish(es) out of 10. The team that performed best (determined by scores given) would be given a scoring advantage at the Sudden Death Cook-Off. Despite the departure of Stacey & Ash, the weakest team would still be determined by Pete and Colin and would be sent to Sudden Death and the MKR Restaurant.

Challenge Summary
Team		Dish	Result
QLD	Andy & Ruby	Spiced Lamb Backstrap with Quinoa Salad & Yoghurt & Feta Sauce	People's Choice
NSW	Josh & Austin	Eye Fillet with Roasted Jalapeño Hummus & Black Bean Salad	Safe
VIC	Mick & Jodie-Anne	Baklava with Honey Syrup & Stewed Apple	Safe
NSW	Ibby & Romel	Chocolate Olive Oil Cake with Roasted Grapes, Citrus & Berries	Safe
WA	Amanda & Blake	Chicken Roulade with Mushrooms	Through to Sudden Death
NSW	Stacey & Ash	Withdrew due to medical issues	

==== Group 2: Seafood Challenge ====
- Episode 24
- Airdate — 10 March
- Guest Mentor - Sean Connoly
- Description — Group 2 were asked to make fine dining seafood dishes for 100 sailors. Guests and teams from Group 1 were invited to taste the food and score the dish(es) out of 10. The team that performed best (determined by scores given) would be given a scoring advantage at the Sudden Death Cook-Off. The weakest team as determined by Pete and Colin would be sent to Sudden Death at the MKR Restaurant.

Challenge Summary
Team		Dish	Result
WA	Lisa & John	Barramundi with Potato & Lobster Croquettes and Lime & Dill Mayo	People's Choice
VIC	Pat & Bianca	Prawn Fettuccine	Safe
NSW	Matt & Luke	Chargrilled Squid with Tabouli & Baba Ganoush	Safe
NSW	Veronica & Piper	Spiced Salmon with Avocado Salsa & Asparagus	Safe
VIC	Victor & G	Poached Salmon Mousse with Garlic & Lemongrass Prawns	Safe
SA	Lyn & Sal	Tuna with Smashed Potatoes, Prosciutto Wrapped Asparagus & Mustard Cream	Through to Sudden Death

==== Sudden Death Cook-Off ====
- Episode 25
- Airdate — 11 March
- Description — Amanda & Blake and Lyn & Sal, were the weakest teams in the group challenges, and will face off in a Sudden Death Cook-Off at the MKR Restaurant, where one team will be eliminated. All guest teams score both meals out of 10. Andy & Ruby and Lisa & John, as People's Choice winners, had the advantage of having each team member score both meals, meaning their scores would be doubled. Judges Pete and Manu scored each dish out of 10.

Sudden Death Cook-Off Results
Sudden Death Cook-Off 4
Team		Guest Score (out of 110)	Pete's Scores			Manu's Scores			Total (out of 170)	Result
Team		Guest Score (out of 110)	Entrée	Main	Dessert	Entrée	Main	Dessert	Total (out of 170)	Result
SA	Lyn & Sal	86	9	7	8	8	6	8	132	Safe
Dishes	Entrée	Broad Bean & Goats Cheese Bruschetta								Safe
Dishes	Main	Eggplant Parmigiana with Leaf Salad								Safe
Dishes	Dessert	Pistachio & Lemon Syrup Cake								Safe
WA	Amanda & Blake	63	6	6	7	7	6	7	102	Eliminated
Dishes	Entrée	Beef Carpaccio with Whipped Marrow								Eliminated
Dishes	Main	Osso Buco with Saffron Risotto								Eliminated
Dishes	Dessert	Dark Chocolate Tart with Strawberries								Eliminated

=== Top 10 ===
==== Open Houses ====
- Episodes 26 to 30
- Airdate — 12 to 19 March
- Description — For the first time ever on My Kitchen Rules, teams are paired in mystery match-ups for a supercharged Open House round, serving a three-course meal to judges, guest teams and members of the public. The bottom pair of teams will find themselves cooking against each other at the Sudden Death Cook-Off.

Open House Summary
Open House Challenge
Team and Episode Details			Guest Scores										Pete's Scores			Manu's Scores			Public Average			Total (out of 170)	Rank	Result
Team and Episode Details			I&R	V&G	L&J	A&R	M&L	P&B	L&S	M&J	V&P	J&A	Entrée	Main	Dessert	Entrée	Main	Dessert	Entrée	Main	Dessert	Total (out of 170)	Rank	Result
VIC	NSW	Victor & G Ibby & Romel	—	—	9	7	7	7	9	7	9	8	10	8	9	10	7	8	8	6	7	136	1st	Safe
Ep 26		12 March	Spice Boys																					Safe
Dishes		Entrée	Coconut Curry Mussels with Flatbread																					Safe
Dishes		Main	Roasted Pork with Ras el Hanout, Apple Sauce and Fennel & Mint Salad																					Safe
Dishes		Dessert	Mango Pudding with Caramelised Pineapple																					Safe
QLD	WA	Andy & Ruby Lisa & John	7	7	—	—	6	7	7	7	7	7	9	6	8	9	6	8	8	6	8	123	2nd	Safe
Ep 27		13 March	2 to Tango																					Safe
Dishes		Entrée	BBQ Prawns with Poached Fennel and Chilli & Lime Salsa																					Safe
Dishes		Main	Seafood Paella																					Safe
Dishes		Dessert	Chilled Lemon Soufflé																					Safe
NSW	VIC	Matt & Luke Pat & Bianca	7	7	6	5	—	—	7	5	5	7	7	8	4	7	7	4	9	7	6	108	4th	Safe
Ep 28		17 March	B and The Three																					Safe
Dishes		Entrée	Ricotta and Pine Nut Stuffed Zucchini Flowers																					Safe
Dishes		Main	Pork Ribs with Duck Fat Potatoes and Apple & Fennel Slaw																					Safe
Dishes		Dessert	Berry Cheesecake																					Safe
SA	VIC	Lyn & Sal Mick & Jodie-Anne	5	5	5	5	4	4	—	—	4	5	1	5	2	2	7	3	5	6	6	74	5th	Through to Sudden Death
Ep 29		18 March	Vintage Port																					Through to Sudden Death
Dishes		Entrée	Warm Beef Salad																					Through to Sudden Death
Dishes		Main	Spinach & Ricotta Veal Rolls with Lemon & White Wine Sauce																					Through to Sudden Death
Dishes		Dessert	Apple Caramel Dumplings with Mascarpone Cream																					Through to Sudden Death
NSW		Veronica & Piper Josh & Austin	7	7	7	6	6	6	7	6	—	—	6	9	7	6	7	7	7	8	9	118	3rd	Safe
Ep 30		19 March	Honestly Good																					Safe
Dishes		Entrée	Jerusalem Artichoke and White Mushroom Soup with Black Truffles																					Safe
Dishes		Main	Spiced Venison with Red Wine Jus and Roasted Sweet Potatoes																					Safe
Dishes		Dessert	Chocolate Brownie																					Safe

==== Sudden Death Cook-Off ====
- Episode 31
- Airdate — 20 March
- Description — Mick & Jodie-Anne and Lyn & Sal, were the weakest teams in the open house challenge, and will face off in a Sudden Death Cook-Off at the MKR Restaurant, where one team will be eliminated. All guest teams score both meals out of 10. Judges Pete and Manu scored each dish out of 10.

Sudden Death Cook-Off Results
Sudden Death Cook-Off 5
Team		Guest Score (out of 80)	Pete's Scores			Manu's Scores			Total (out of 140)	Result
Team		Guest Score (out of 80)	Entrée	Main	Dessert	Entrée	Main	Dessert	Total (out of 140)	Result
SA	Lyn & Sal	55	5	8	7	7	7	7	96	Safe
Dishes	Entrée	Saganaki Prawns with Crusty Bread								Safe
Dishes	Main	Pugliese Ragù								Safe
Dishes	Dessert	Dolce di Ricotta								Safe
VIC	Mick & Jodie-Anne	42	9	3	2	9	3	2	70	Eliminated
Dishes	Entrée	Thai Pumpkin Soup with Fried Quail Egg								Eliminated
Dishes	Main	Chicken, Asparagus & Brie Filo Parcel with Creamed Corn								Eliminated
Dishes	Dessert	Brandy Snap Basket with Exotic Fruit Salad and Cointreau Cream								Eliminated

=== Top 9 ===
- Episode 32
- Airdate — 24 March
- Description — Teams all cooked together. They were asked to make a biscuit with a few other elements to make it a complete dish for hungry shoppers and the Judges. Based on the public's scores out of 10, the winning team will have their biscuit packaged and sold in Coles Supermarkets around Australia. The weakest team as determined by Pete and Colin, will receive a time penalty and have a disadvantage in the next challenge.

Challenge Summary
SA	Lyn & Sal	Macadamia Brownie Biscuit with Praline and Strawberries	People's Choice
VIC	Pat & Bianca	Chocolate & Hazelnut Biscuit with Chocolate Mousse and Berries	Safe
VIC	Victor & G	Cherry Kiss Macaroon with Whipped Cherry Yoghurt and Sour Cherry Drizzle	Safe
WA	Lisa & John	Parmesan, Cheddar & Chive Biscuit with Smoked Salmon Pâté and Cucumber Oil	Safe
QLD	Andy & Ruby	Peruvian Cookie with Cinnamon Cream and Grilled Pineapple	Safe
NSW	Matt & Luke	Sweet Potato Crackers with Mexican Beef and Salsa	Safe
NSW	Josh & Austin	Pistachio Shortbread with Spiced Crème Anglaise and Rhubarb Compote	Safe
NSW	Ibby & Romel	Maple Bacon & Peanut Butter Biscuit with Brûléed Banana and Bacon Crumb	Safe
NSW	Veronica & Piper	White Chocolate Rocky Road Cookie with Banana and Peanuts	Disadvantage next challenge

- Episode 33
- Airdate — 25 March
- Description — Teams cooked in two rounds. They had to make a great dish featuring different types of Beer. They served the beer loving public, the other teams who weren't cooking, and the judges. The favorite dish, chosen by the beer lovers, will get beer lovers choice and not have to cook in the next challenge. Pete and Colin will choose the worst dish who will go through to the next sudden death cook off at the MKR Restaurant.

Challenge Summary
Team		Dish	Result
1st Course
NSW	Ibby & Romel	Spiced Lamb & Ale Gözleme	People's Choice
QLD	Andy & Ruby	Beer Battered Chicken Tacos with Spicy Asian Salad	Safe
NSW	Veronica & Piper	Guinness Beef Stew with Roast Potatoes	Safe
SA	Lyn & Sal	Chicken & Stout Pot Pie With Smashed Peas	Safe
NSW	Josh & Austin	Beer Braised Pork Spare Ribs with Coconut Rice	Safe
2nd Course
WA	Lisa & John	Pork Schnitzel with Thick Cut Chips and Mushroom, Beer & Garlic Sauce	Safe
VIC	Pat & Bianca	Lamb Yeeros with Feta Potatoes and Tzatziki	Safe
NSW	Matt & Luke	Dukkah Crusted Lamb with Beetroot Hummus and Motorcycle Oil Sauce	Safe
VIC	Victor & G	Beer Braised Sausages with Potato Gratin and Pale Ale Sauerkraut	Through to Sudden Death

- Episode 34
- Airdate — 26 March
- Description — Teams were split up over 3 locations, The Sydney Cricket Ground, a Fire Station and a Construction Site. They were asked to make a delicious meal for their specific diners and judges. The team with the highest score from their diners will be named People's Choice. The weakest team, chosen by Pete & Colin, will be sent to the Elimination Cook-Off against Victor & G.

Challenge Summary
Team		Dish	Result
Sydney Cricket Ground
NSW	Matt & Luke	Spaghetti and Meatballs	People's Choice
QLD	Andy & Ruby	Wagyu Eye Fillet with Asparagus, Potato & Bacon Salad and Argentinian Chimichurri	Safe
Fire Station
NSW	Josh & Austin	Jamaican Jerk Beef with Fully Loaded Quinoa Salad	Safe
WA	Lisa & John	Crispy Chicken Wings with Fire Chief Sauce and Iceberg Wedge Salad	Safe
Construction Site
NSW	Veronica & Piper	Cottage Pie with Rocket, Pear and Roasted Walnut Salad	Safe
VIC	Pat & Bianca	Chicken Parmigiana and Potato Salad	Safe
SA	Lyn & Sal	Mac & Cheese with Brussels & Bacon Salad and Blue Cheese Dressing	Through to Sudden Death

==== Sudden Death Cook-Off ====
- Episode 35
- Airdate – 27 March
- Description – Victor & G and Lyn & Sal were the two weakest teams from the previous challenges. They will go against each other in a 3 course cook-off. As People's Choice winners, Ibby & Romel and Matt & Luke will get a scoring advantage and will both score each 3 course meal out of 10, giving them a total score out of 20. The other teams will score as a team out of 10. Pete & Manu will score each dish out of 10. The team with the lowest total score will be eliminated.

Sudden Death Cook-Off Results
Sudden Death Cook-Off 6
Team		Guest Score (out of 80)	Pete's Scores			Manu's Scores			Total (out of 140)	Result
Team		Guest Score (out of 80)	Entrée	Main	Dessert	Entrée	Main	Dessert	Total (out of 140)	Result
VIC	Victor & G	59	10	9	4	10	9	4	105	Safe
Dishes	Entrée	Agedashi Tofu								Safe
Dishes	Main	Fish Curry								Safe
Dishes	Dessert	Lime Cake with Elderflower Buttercream								Safe
SA	Lyn & Sal	69	7	6	5	7	6	4	104	Eliminated
Dishes	Entrée	Pork Gyoza								Eliminated
Dishes	Main	Grilled Hoisin Quail with Vietnamese Coleslaw and Soy Vinaigrette								Eliminated
Dishes	Dessert	Banana Spring Rolls								Eliminated

=== Top 8 ===
==== Ultimate Instant Restaurants ====
- Episodes - 36 to 43
- Air date — 31 March to 10 April
- Description — The 8 remaining teams are once again travelling around the country for the Ultimate Instant Restaurant round. It's opened by Matt and Luke and Closed by Andy and Ruby. Teams will cook 2 Entrées, 2 Mains, and 2 Desserts. Following success last year the clock returns for each course with 90 minutes for both Entrée and Main and 1 hour for Dessert. The team with the lowest score will be eliminated.

Colour Key:
– Judge's Score for Option 1
– Judge's Score for Option 2

Ultimate Instant Restaurant Summary
Top 8
Team and Episode Details			Guest Scores								Pete's Scores			Manu's Scores			Total (out of 140)	Rank	Result
Team and Episode Details			M&L	J&A	P&B	V&G	L&J	I&R	V&P	A&R	Entrée	Main	Dessert	Entrée	Main	Dessert	Total (out of 140)	Rank	Result
NSW	Matt & Luke		-	7	7	8	7	6	7	6	8	7	7	10	9	5	94	2nd	Safe
Ep 36	31 March		Powerplay																Safe
Dishes	Entrées	1	Octopus with Romesco Sauce																Safe
Dishes	Entrées	2	Duck with Mushrooms																Safe
Dishes	Main	1	Pork with Braised Cabbage and Mustard Sauce																Safe
Dishes	Main	2	Roasted Lamb Rack with Sweet Potato Purée and Asparagus																Safe
Dishes	Dessert	1	Honey & Macadamia Tart with Vanilla Bean Ice Cream																Safe
Dishes	Dessert	2	Upside Down Grape & Rosemary Cake																Safe
NSW	Josh & Austin		5	-	4	6	3	4	3	5	6	8	6	1	4	8	63	7th	Safe
Ep 37	1 April		Armageddon Fed																Safe
Dishes	Entrées	1	Creole Scallops with Sweet Potato and Onion Marmalade																Safe
Dishes	Entrées	2	Green Banana and Lime Tamales																Safe
Dishes	Main	1	Plantain Gnocchi with Short Rib Ragù																Safe
Dishes	Main	2	Lobster Étouffée																Safe
Dishes	Dessert	1	Bourbon Pecan Tart																Safe
Dishes	Dessert	2	Floating Island																Safe
VIC	Pat & Bianca		6	8	-	7	8	5	7	4	10	3	8	6	8	7	87	4th	Safe
Ep 38	2 April		Harlequin																Safe
Dishes	Entrées	1	Peasant Soup																Safe
Dishes	Entrées	2	Olive, Tomato & Mozarella Piadina																Safe
Dishes	Main	1	Mushroom Lasagne																Safe
Dishes	Main	2	Stuffed Calamari																Safe
Dishes	Dessert	1	Bomboloni																Safe
Dishes	Dessert	2	Cannoli																Safe
VIC	Victor & G		7	6	6	-	7	5	8	5	4	10	10	9	8	5	90	3rd	Safe
Ep 39	3 April		Chí																Safe
Dishes	Entrées	1	Teriyaki Fish with Ichiban Dashi																Safe
Dishes	Entrées	2	Beef Tataki with Ponzu and Seaweed Salad																Safe
Dishes	Main	1	Beef Rendang																Safe
Dishes	Main	2	Dong Po Rou (Braised Chinese Pork Belly with Chinese Greens)																Safe
Dishes	Dessert	1	Crème Caramel with Pistachio Praline																Safe
Dishes	Dessert	2	Passionfruit Swiss Roll																Safe
WA	Lisa & John		6	4	6	7	-	6	6	6	6	6	7	8	6	9	83	6th	Safe
Ep 40	7 April		The Tasting Room																Safe
Dishes	Entrées	1	Jamón Croquettes																Safe
Dishes	Entrées	2	Crumbed Calf Livers with Caramelised Red Onions																Safe
Dishes	Main	1	Bouillabaisse																Safe
Dishes	Main	2	Duck with Cherry Sauce																Safe
Dishes	Dessert	1	Nectarine Tarte Tatin																Safe
Dishes	Dessert	2	Strawberry and Lime Syllabub																Safe
NSW	Ibby & Romel		8	8	10	8	8	-	9	7	10	10	10	8	10	5	111	1st	Safe
Ep 41	8 April		Najah																Safe
Dishes	Entrées	1	Middle Eastern Spring Rolls																Safe
Dishes	Entrées	2	Harissa Spiced Tuna Tartare with Lemon Custard																Safe
Dishes	Main	1	Glazed Beef with Artichoke Puree and Pickled Kohlrabi																Safe
Dishes	Main	2	Chermoula Spiced Barramundi with Lentils & Potato																Safe
Dishes	Dessert	1	Rosewater Teacake with Roasted Plums & Mascarpone Cream																Safe
Dishes	Dessert	2	Toffeed Fig Pavlova																Safe
NSW	Veronica & Piper		6	2	5	6	5	4	-	3	5	5	7	2	6	3	59	8th	Eliminated
Ep 42	9 April		Fit For A Queen																Eliminated
Dishes	Entrées	1	Empanadas																Eliminated
Dishes	Entrées	2	Crab Stuffed Lobster Tail																Eliminated
Dishes	Main	1	Filet Mignon with Mushroom Sauce and Garlic Green Beans																Eliminated
Dishes	Main	2	Quail with Roasted Parsnip																Eliminated
Dishes	Dessert	1	Lemon Crème Brûlée with Candied Lemon																Eliminated
Dishes	Dessert	2	Strawberry & Elderflower Frasier Cake																Eliminated
QLD	Andy & Ruby		41^{1}							-	8	6	7	10	7	7	86	5th	Safe
Ep 43	10 April		Pachamama																Safe
Dishes	Entrées	1	Causa Acevichada																Safe
Dishes	Entrées	2	Bao Buns with Peruvian Chicken																Safe
Dishes	Main	1	Pescado A Lo Macho																Safe
Dishes	Main	2	Chupe De Camaroes																Safe
Dishes	Dessert	1	Pisco Sour																Safe
Dishes	Dessert	2	Chocolate and Mandarin																Safe

Note

- ^1 – Individual guest scores were not revealed.

=== Top 7 - Quarterfinals ===
The Top 7 teams meet at Kitchen Headquarters to compete in four Quarter Final challenges to determine the teams entering the Semi-Final round. One team advances after each night until the Top 4 semi-finalists are decided and the remaining three teams will be eliminated.

==== Quarterfinals 1 ====
- Episode 44
- Air date - 14 April
- Description — This is the first quarterfinal of this season. Seven teams have to cook for Pete, Colin and 100 public customers. Also, Manu will be in charge of the kitchen and tell the orders to the contestants. Scores from judges Pete, Colin and the public customers will determine the winning team who will go straight to the Semi-Finals.

Challenge Summary
Team		Dish	Score (Out of 30)	Result
NSW	Ibby & Romel	Spiced Fish Pastilla with Almonds & Sultanas	28	Through to the Semi-Finals
NSW	Matt & Luke	Prosciutto Wrapped Eye Fillet with Garlic Mash and Salsa Verde	26	Through to Quarter Final 2
VIC	Victor & G	Coconut Black Rice Pudding	22	Through to Quarter Final 2
NSW	Josh & Austin	Duck with Red Wine Sauce and Parsnip Purée	21	Through to Quarter Final 2
QLD	Andy & Ruby	Cereal Panna Cotta	18	Through to Quarter Final 2
WA	Lisa & John	Lamb with Duck Fat Potatoes and Blackberries	16	Through to Quarter Final 2
VIC	Pat & Bianca	Chocolate and Salted Caramel Layer Cake	15	Through to Quarter Final 2

==== Quarterfinals 2 ====
- Episode 45
- Air date - 15 April
- Description — This is the second quarterfinal of this season. Six teams have to cook for Pete, Manu & Colin and 100 VIP customers including celebrities at the MKR restaurant. Scores from judges Pete, Manu, Colin and the VIPs will determine the winning team.

Challenge Summary
Team		Dish	Score (Out of 40)	Result
NSW	Matt & Luke	Sunday Roast	39	Through to the Semi-Finals
VIC	Pat & Bianca	Salmon Pâté on Herbed Biscuit	37	Through to Quarter Final 3
WA	Lisa & John	Asian Pork & Scallop Spoons	37	Through to Quarter Final 3
QLD	Andy & Ruby	Aji De Gallina Tartlets	34	Through to Quarter Final 3
VIC	Victor & G	Jalapeño & Coconut Kingfish	27	Through to Quarter Final 3
NSW	Josh & Austin	Marie Rose Prawn Tartlets	27	Through to Quarter Final 3

==== Quarterfinals 3 ====
- Episode 46
- Air date - 16 April
- Description — This is the third quarterfinal of this season. Five teams have to cook for Pete, Manu & Colin and contestants from the past seasons at the MKR restaurant. Scores from judges Pete, Manu and the past contestants will determine the winning team who will join Ibby & Romel, Matt & Luke in the Semi-Finals.

Challenge Summary
Team		Dish	Score (Out of 30)	Result
VIC	Pat & Bianca	Fettucine Carbonara with Pangrattato	28	Through to the Semi-Finals
NSW	Josh & Austin	Lime Tart with Raspberry Coulis	25	Through to Quarter Final 4
WA	Lisa & John	Lemon Delicious with Blueberry Compote	22	Through to Quarter Final 4
QLD	Andy & Ruby	Lamb Rack with Pea & Mint Purée and Asian Salsa Verde	22	Through to Quarter Final 4
VIC	Victor & G	Satay Chicken with Coconut Rice and Cucumber Yoghurt Salad	21	Through to Quarter Final 4

==== Quarterfinals 4 ====
- Episode 47
- Air date - 21 April

===== Round 1 =====
- Description — This is the fourth and final quarterfinal of this season. Four teams have to cook for 100 kids at the MKR restaurant. Scores from judges Pete and Manu, will determine the three teams into Round 2 while one team is eliminated.

Challenge Summary
Team		Dish	Score (Out of 20)	Result
QLD	Andy & Ruby	Mexican Burger with Pineapple Salsa And Corn	20	Through to Round 2
WA	Lisa & John	Mango Chicken Curry with Cauliflower Rice	17	Through to Round 2
NSW	Josh & Austin	Pork & Bacon Veggie Bowl with Mango & Blueberries	15	Through to Round 2
VIC	Victor & G	Chicken Risoni with Blistered Tomatoes, Grilled Peaches & Apricots	13	Eliminated

===== Round 2 - Top 6 =====
- Description — The three teams who advanced from Round 1 will have to cook for 100 adults, Pete and Manu. Scores from judges Pete, Manu and the adults will determine the winning team who will join Ibby & Romel, Luke & Matt and Pat & Bianca in the Semi Finals.

Challenge Summary
Team		Dish	Score (Out of 30)	Result
QLD	Andy & Ruby	Miso Salmon In Spicy Broth	29	Through to the Semi-Finals
WA	Lisa & John	Duck with Peaches And Madeira Jus	27	Eliminated
NSW	Josh & Austin	Beef & Lobster Tartare with Vodka Crème Fraîche	25	Eliminated

=== Semi-finals ===
==== Semi-final 1 ====
- Episode 48
- Airdate — 22 April
- Description — Ibby & Romel compete against Pat & Bianca.

Semi-Final Cook-Off Results
Semi-Final 1
Team		Judge's Scores						Total (out of 60)	Result
Team		Karen	Guy	Liz	Colin	Pete	Manu	Total (out of 60)	Result
NSW	Ibby & Romel	8	8	9	7	8	8	48	Through to Grand Final
Dishes	Entrée	Lebanese Chicken Liver with Pickles and SAJ							Through to Grand Final
Dishes	Main	Samke Harra							Through to Grand Final
Dishes	Dessert	Pistachio Frangipane Tart with Halva Ice-Cream							Through to Grand Final
VIC	Pat & Bianca	7	7	7	7	7	7	42	Eliminated
Dishes	Entrée	Seared Scallops with Cauliflower Purée and Salsa Fresca							Eliminated
Dishes	Main	Osso Bucco with Polenta							Eliminated
Dishes	Dessert	Zabaglione with Roasted Pear							Eliminated

==== Semi-final 2 ====
- Episode 49
- Airdate — 23 April
- Description — Matt & Luke compete against Andy & Ruby.

Semi-Final Cook-Off Results
Semi-Final 2
Team		Judge's Scores						Total (out of 60)	Result
Team		Karen	Guy	Liz	Colin	Pete	Manu	Total (out of 60)	Result
NSW	Matt & Luke	10	10	10	9	10	10	59	Through to Grand Final
Dishes	Entrée	Kangaroo Tartare with Wattleseed and Nasturtium							Through to Grand Final
Dishes	Main	Pappardelle with Abruzzese Lamb Ragù							Through to Grand Final
Dishes	Dessert	Chocolate Tart with Espresso Semifreddo							Through to Grand Final
QLD	Andy & Ruby	9	10	9	9	10	10	57	Eliminated
Dishes	Entrée	Tuna Wonton Cones							Eliminated
Dishes	Main	Seco de Carne							Eliminated
Dishes	Dessert	Tocino del Cielo							Eliminated

=== Grand Finale ===
- Episode 50
- Airdate — 28 April
- Description — Each finalist cooked a five-course meal, with over 20 plates per course for the eliminated teams, friends and family. In a series first, the guest judges, Pete and Manu, were joined by four special guests judges who appeared in challenge episodes throughout the series, meaning there were 10 judges total this year. They each scored the five course meals out of 10 for the final verdict.

Grand Final Results
Grand Final
Team		Judge's Scores										Total (out of 100)	Result
Team		Karen	Guy Grossi	Liz	Colin	Guy Turland	Rachel	Shannon	Sean	Pete	Manu	Total (out of 100)	Result
NSW	Matt & Luke	9	10	10	9	9	8	9	9	10	9	92	Winners
Dishes		Powerplay											Winners
1st Course		Confit Salmon with Peas											Winners
2nd Course		Duck Ravioli with Wild Mushroom Sauce											Winners
3rd Course		Barramundi with Roasted Fennel											Winners
4th Course		Beef Cheek with Parsnip Mash											Winners
5th Course		Peach Bellini											Winners
NSW	Ibby & Romel	8	9	9	9	9	9	8	9	9	9	88	Runners-up
Dishes		Najah											Runners-up
1st Course		Kibbeh Nayeh with Nigella Seed Lavosh											Runners-up
2nd Course		Lebanese Shish Barak with Pine Nuts											Runners-up
3rd Course		Chargrilled Octopus with Muhammara											Runners-up
4th Course		Spiced Kangaroo with Freekeh and Labneh											Runners-up
5th Course		Knafeh with Pistachio Ice-Cream											Runners-up

== Ratings ==
Colour Key:
– Highest Rating
– Lowest Rating
– Elimination Episode
– Finals Week

Week	Episode		Air date	Viewers (millions) (Note: Ratings data used is from OzTAM and represents the live and same day average viewership from the 5 largest Australian metropolitan centres (Sydney, Melbourne, Brisbane, Perth and Adelaide).)	Nightly rank	Source
1	1	Instant Restaurant 1-1: Stacey & Ash	Monday, 28 January	0.816	6	
1	2	Instant Restaurant 1-2: Amanda & Blake	Tuesday, 29 January	0.814	5	
1	3	Instant Restaurant 1-3: Karito & Ian	Wednesday, 30 January	0.789	6	
2	4	Instant Restaurant 1-4: Chris & Lesley	Sunday, 3 February	0.808	5	
2	5	Instant Restaurant 1-5: Andy & Ruby	Monday, 4 February	0.841	6	
2	6	Instant Restaurant 1-6: Mick & Jodie-Anne	Tuesday, 5 February	0.847	6	
2	7	Instant Restaurant 1-7: Ibby & Romel	Wednesday, 6 February	0.816	6	
3	8	Instant Restaurant 1-8: Josh & Austin	Sunday, 10 February	1.046	2	
3	9	Sudden Death Cook-Off 1	Monday, 11 February	0.906	5	
3	10	Instant Restaurant 2-1: Lisa & John	Tuesday, 12 February	0.855	4	
3	11	Instant Restaurant 2-2: Victor & G	Wednesday, 13 February	0.766	6	
4	12	Instant Restaurant 2-3: Pat & Bianca	Sunday, 17 February	0.905	4	
4	13	Instant Restaurant 2-4: Anne & Jennifer	Monday, 18 February	0.709	8	
4	14	Instant Restaurant 2-5: Lyn & Sal	Tuesday, 19 February	0.774	7	
4	15	Instant Restaurant 2-6: Matt & Luke	Wednesday, 20 February	0.724	7	
5	16	Instant Restaurant 2-7: Veronica & Piper	Sunday, 24 February	0.751	5	
5	17	Instant Restaurant 2-8: Milly & Karolina	Monday, 25 February	0.764	8	
5	18	Sudden Death Cook-Off 2	Tuesday, 26 February	0.861	6	
5	19	Group Challenge and Sudden Death Cook-Off 3	Wednesday, 27 February	0.740	7	
6	20	Top 13 - Group 2 Pop Up Restaurant: Diner Challenge	Sunday, 3 March	0.716	6	
6	21	Top 13 - Group 1 Pop Up Restaurant: Brunch Challenge	Monday, 4 March	0.708	10	
6	22	Sudden Death Cook-Off 4	Tuesday, 5 March	0.753	8	
6	23	Top 12 →Top 11 - Group 1 Pop Up Restaurant: Farmers Challenge	Wednesday, 6 March	0.732	7	
7	24	Top 12 →Top 11 - Group 2 Pop Up Restaurant: Seafood Challenge	Sunday, 10 March	0.732	4	
7	25	Sudden Death Cook-Off 5	Monday, 11 March	0.761	7	
7	26	Top 10 - Open House 1: Victor & G, Ibby & Romel	Tuesday, 12 March	0.728	8	
7	27	Top 10 - Open House 2: Andy & Ruby, Lisa & John	Wednesday, 13 March	0.662	8	
8	28	Top 10 - Open House 3: Matt & Luke, Pat & Bianca	Sunday, 17 March	0.723	9	
8	29	Top 10 - Open House 4: Lyn & Sal, Mick & Jodie-Anne	Monday, 18 March	0.714	8	
8	30	Top 10 - Open House 5: Veronica & Piper, Josh & Austin	Tuesday, 19 March	0.746	8	
8	31	Sudden Death Cook-Off 6	Wednesday, 20 March	0.738	7	
9	32	Top 9 - Coles Supermarket Biscuit Challenge	Sunday, 24 March	0.774	5	
9	33	Top 9 - Beer Challenge	Monday, 25 March	0.763	8	
9	34	Top 9 - Moveable Feast Challenge	Tuesday, 26 March	0.806	8	
9	35	Sudden Death Cook-Off 7	Wednesday, 27 March	0.732	7	
10	36	Ultimate Instant Restaurant 1: Matt & Luke	Sunday, 31 March	0.800	5	
10	37	Ultimate Instant Restaurant 2: Josh & Austin	Monday, 1 April	0.831	7	
10	38	Ultimate Instant Restaurant 3: Pat & Bianca	Tuesday, 2 April	0.832	7	
10	39	Ultimate Instant Restaurant 4: Victor & G	Wednesday, 3 April	0.916	3	
11	40	Ultimate Instant Restaurant 5: Lisa & John	Sunday, 7 April	0.784	5	
11	41	Ultimate Instant Restaurant 6: Ibby & Romel	Monday, 8 April	0.710	9	
11	42	Ultimate Instant Restaurant 7: Veronica & Piper	Tuesday, 9 April	0.854	5	
11	43	Ultimate Instant Restaurant 8: Andy & Ruby	Wednesday, 10 April	0.885	5	
12	44	Top 7 - Quarter Final 1	Sunday, 14 April	0.826	3	
12	45	Top 7 - Quarter Final 2	Monday, 15 April	0.850	5	
12	46	Top 7 - Quarter Final 3	Tuesday, 16 April	0.829	5	
13	47	Top 7 - Quarter Final 4	Sunday, 21 April	0.752	3	
13	48	Semi-Final 1	Monday, 22 April	0.812	6	
13	49	Semi-Final 2	Tuesday, 23 April	0.825	5	
14	50	Grand Final	Sunday, 28 April	0.873	5	
14	50	Grand Final - Winner Announced	Sunday, 28 April	0.946	4	
