= My Kitchen Rules series 9 =

My Kitchen Rules
- Series 9
- No. of episodes: 49

Release
- Original network: Seven Network
- Original release: 29 January – 6 May 2018

Season chronology
- ← Previous; Series 8 (2017) Next → Series 10 (2019)

The ninth season of the Australian competitive cooking competition show My Kitchen Rules premiered on the Seven Network on Monday 29 January 2018.

Applications for contestants opened during the airing of the eighth season. Pete Evans and Manu Feildel returned as judges, with Colin Fassnidge acting as a judge/mentor in the challenge/elimination rounds.

== Format changes ==
- Group Challenges – Teams were divided into two groups of eight for their Instant restaurant rounds. In previous series, teams were usually combined afterwards, however this year, teams continue to compete as part of their groups during the Top 14 to Top 9 rounds. Each group competed in separate People's Choice challenges which also allowed the opposing group to judge and observe the teams' cooking. Once the competition reached the Top 8, teams were combined as a single group.
- Elimination House – After each challenge, the bottom two teams are sent to Elimination House, a large mansion with two full-sized kitchens for the competing teams to use. Both teams cook a three-course menu for a table of the remaining teams and judges Pete and Manu. Similar to an Instant Restaurant, guest teams and judges score both menus and the lower scoring team is eliminated from the competition.
- Double Elimination Quarterfinal - For the first time, two teams will be eliminated from the competition in the last quarterfinal.

== Teams ==
Home/State		Group	Members	Relationship	Status
Gold Coast	QLD	1	Alex & Emily	Foodie Fans	Winners 6 May (Grand Finale)
Melbourne	VIC	1	Kim & Suong	Melbourne Mums	Runners-up 6 May (Grand Finale)
Perth	WA	1	Stella & Jazzey	Perth Waitresses	Eliminated 3 May (Semi-Final 2)
Sydney	NSW	1	Josh & Nic	Italiano Brothers	Eliminated 2 May (Semi-Final 1)
Sydney	NSW	2	Olga & Valeria	Cooking Comrades	Eliminated 1 May (Top 6)
Deloraine	TAS	2	Henry & Anna	Truffle Farmers	Eliminated 1 May (Top 6)
Sydney	NSW	1	Jess & Emma	Sydney Sisters	Eliminated 25 April (Top 7: UIR)
Sydney	NSW	2	Sonya & Hadil	Fierce Besties	Dismissed 18 April (Top 8)
Perth	WA	2	Davide & Marco	Lifelong Mates	Eliminated 21 March (Top 9)
Coffs Harbour	NSW	2	Georgie & Alicia	Confident Siblings	Eliminated 18 March (Top 10)
Adelaide	SA	2	Dan & Gemma	In-Laws	Eliminated 13 March (Top 11)
Brisbane	QLD	2	Matt & Aly	Defence Force Foodies	Eliminated 8 March (Top 12)
Melbourne	VIC	1	Roula & Rachael	Friends with Attitude	Eliminated 5 March (Top 13)
Brisbane	QLD	1	Stuss & Steve	Best Buddies	Eliminated 27 February (Top 14)
Sydney	NSW	2	Pat & Louisa	Mum and Daughter	Eliminated 26 February (IR: Round 2)
Sunshine Coast	QLD	1	Ash & Matty	Sunny Coast Surfies	Eliminated 12 February (IR: Round 1)

== Elimination history ==
Teams' Competition Progress
Round:	Instant Restaurants				Top 14	Top 13	Top 12	Top 11	Top 10	Top 9	Top 8 → Top 7		Top 6 - Quarter Finals				Semi-Finals		Grand Finale
Round:	1		2		Top 14	Top 13	Top 12	Top 11	Top 10	Top 9	PC	UIR	1	2	3	4	1	2	Grand Finale
Teams:	Progress																		
Alex & Emily	3rd (70)	→	—N/a		SD; Safe	People's; Choice	People's; Choice	SD (134)	SD (131)	People's; Choice	→	1st (93)	→	Win	Immune		—N/a	1st (53)	Winners (55)
Kim & Suong	1st (88)	→	—N/a		SD; Safe	Safe	Safe	Safe	Safe	SD (132)	→	4th^{1} (78)	→	→	Win	Immune	1st (49)	—N/a	Runners-up (52)
Stella & Jazzey	8th (45)	SD (103)	—N/a		SD; Safe	Safe	Safe	People's; Choice	Safe	Safe	Penalty	6th^{1} (57)	→	→	→	Win	—N/a	2nd (37)	Eliminated (Episode 48)
Josh & Nic	2nd (87)	→	—N/a		SD; Safe	Safe	SD (141)	Safe	People's; Choice	Safe	People's; Choice	5th (77)	Win	Immune			2nd (45)	Eliminated (Episode 47)	
Olga & Valeria	—N/a		3rd (108)	→	Safe	Safe	Safe	Safe	Safe	People's; Choice	→	2nd^{1} (87)	→	→	→	Lose	Eliminated (Episode 46)		
Henry & Anna	—N/a		4th (107)	→	Safe	Safe	Safe	Safe	People's; Choice	Safe	→	3rd^{1} (81)	→	→	→	Lose	Eliminated (Episode 46)		
Jess & Emma	4th (67)	→	—N/a		SD; Safe	Safe	Safe	Safe	Safe	Safe	→	7th ^{1} (49)	Eliminated^{1} (Episode 42)						
Sonya & Hadil	—N/a		1st (114)	→	Safe	Safe	Safe	Safe	Safe	Safe	→	Dismissed^{1} (Episode 38)							
Davide & Marco	—N/a		5th (99)	→	Safe	People's; Choice	Safe	People's; Choice	Safe	SD (94)	Eliminated (Episode 34)								
Georgie & Alicia	—N/a		2nd (113)	→	Safe	Safe	Safe	Safe	SD (108)	Eliminated (Episode 31)									
Dan & Gemma	—N/a		6th (63)	→	Safe	SD (135)	People's; Choice	SD (106)	Eliminated (Episode 28)										
Matt & Aly	—N/a		7th (60)	SD (67)	Safe	Safe	SD (83)	Eliminated (Episode 25)											
Roula & Rachael	5th (62)	→	—N/a		SD; Safe	SD (94)	Eliminated (Episode 22)												
Stuss & Steve	6th (49)	→	—N/a		SD; Lose	Eliminated (Episode 19)													
Pat & Louisa	—N/a		8th (49)	SD (36)	Eliminated (Episode 18)														
Ash & Matty	7th (46)	SD (67)	Eliminated (Episode 9)																

Cell Descriptions
Group 1	Team competed as part of Group 1 in the Instant Restaurants and rounds from Top 14 to Top 9.
Group 2	Team competed as part of Group 2 in the Instant Restaurants and rounds from Top 14 to Top 9.
	Team won a challenge, People's Choice, cooked the best dish or received the highest score for the round.
	Team is immune and safe from elimination after winning a previous challenge.
	Team lost a challenge, cooked the weakest dish, received a low score and must compete in an additional round or challenge or received a penalty.
Safe	Team was safe from elimination after passing a challenge/round.
→	Team continued to next the challenge/round.
SD	Team competed in a Sudden Death Cook-Off and became safe from elimination.
SD	Team was eliminated after losing in a Sudden Death Cook-Off or round.
Dismissed	Team was dismissed from the competition.
—N/a	Results do not apply as the team was not allocated to this challenge or round.

Note:

- ^1 - Sonya & Hadil were initially “excused from the table” in Episode 38 at Kim & Suong's Ultimate Instant Restaurant from the competition due to issues from incidents. At Stella & Jazzey's Ultimate Instant Restaurant it was announced they would no longer participate and therefore they did not compete in this round as their scores were removed from the first three Ultimate Instant Restaurants (during their participation, they had scored Jess & Emma and Henry & Anna; and the average guest score was initially added for Kim & Suong). The total score was therefore changed from 130 to 120. This round was closed off by Olga & Valeria and the lowest scoring team (Jess & Emma) from the remaining seven teams was still eliminated.

== Competition details ==
=== Instant Restaurants ===
During the Instant Restaurant rounds, each team hosts a three-course dinner for judges and fellow teams in their allocated group. They are scored and ranked among their group, with the two lowest scoring teams competing in a Sudden Death Cook-Off at the Elimination House, where one team will be eliminated.

==== Round 1 ====
- Episodes 1 to 8
- Air date — 29 January to 11 February
- Description — The first of the two instant restaurant groups are introduced into the competition in Round 1. The two lowest scoring teams at the end of this round will compete against each other in a Sudden Death Cook-Off at Elimination House, where one team will be eliminated.

Instant Restaurant Summary
Group 1
Team and Episode Details		Guest Scores								Pete's Scores			Manu's Scores			Total (out of 150)	Rank	Result
Team and Episode Details		J&N	A&E	R&R	K&S	A&M	S&S	S&J	J&E	Entrée	Main	Dessert	Entrée	Main	Dessert	Total (out of 150)	Rank	Result
NSW	Josh & Nic	-	7	5	6	6	6	6	5	7	8	8	7	7	9	87	2nd	Safe
Ep 1	29 January	Calcio e Pepe																Safe
Dishes	Entrée	Spinach & Ricotta Dumplings with Gorgonzola Sauce																Safe
Dishes	Main	Braised Baby Goat with Tomatoes and Peas																Safe
Dishes	Dessert	White Chocolate Panna Cotta with Plums and Ginger																Safe
QLD	Alex & Emily	3	-	5	5	4	5	6	5	8	6	5	8	5	5	70	3rd	Safe
Ep 2	30 January	Love From Miami																Safe
Dishes	Entrée	Pedro Ximénez Chicken Liver Pâté with Homemade Bread																Safe
Dishes	Main	Prawn and Chorizo Bisquotto																Safe
Dishes	Dessert	Rum Cake with Golden Syrup Ice Cream and Pineapple																Safe
VIC	Roula & Rachael	3	4	-	5	5	7	6	3	3	8	4	2	7	5	62	5th	Safe
Ep 3	31 January	House of Flava																Safe
Dishes	Entrée	Chargrilled Prawns with Watermelon and Basil																Safe
Dishes	Main	Salmon with Asparagus and Mustard & Dill Sauce																Safe
Dishes	Dessert	Brownies with Salted Caramel Sauce																Safe
VIC	Kim & Suong	6	6	3	-	5	7	7	7	9	9	7	8	9	5	88	1st	Safe
Ep 4	4 February	Secret Lantern																Safe
Dishes	Entrée	Bánh Xèo (Vietnamese Pancake)																Safe
Dishes	Main	Beef Pho																Safe
Dishes	Dessert	Banana Fritter with Coconut Cream																Safe
QLD	Ash & Matty	3	3	3	4	-	3	4	3	1	2	8	1	3	8	46	7th	Through to Sudden Death
Ep 5	5 February	Get Hooked																Through to Sudden Death
Dishes	Entrée	Calamari Salad																Through to Sudden Death
Dishes	Main	Pork Sliders with Fries																Through to Sudden Death
Dishes	Dessert	Espresso Crème Brûlée																Through to Sudden Death
QLD	Stuss & Steve	2	5	4	4	3	-	5	5	5	1	2	5	3	5	49	6th	Safe
Ep 6	6 February	The Cornered Greek																Safe
Dishes	Entrée	Chargrilled Quail with Rosemary and Lemon																Safe
Dishes	Main	Kleftiko (Greek Baked Lamb)																Safe
Dishes	Dessert	Baklava																Safe
WA	Stella & Jazzey	4	3	3	3	2	2	-	2	10	1	1	10	2	1	45	8th	Through to Sudden Death
Ep 7	7 February	The 'Stume Room																Through to Sudden Death
Dishes	Entrée	Miso Cod																Through to Sudden Death
Dishes	Main	Star Anise Duck with Snow Pea & Cashew Salad																Through to Sudden Death
Dishes	Dessert	Raspberry Doughnuts with Dark Chocolate and Hazelnuts																Through to Sudden Death
NSW	Jess & Emma	5	5	3	6	1	2	9	-	5	1	10	5	6	9	67	4th	Safe
Ep 8	11 February	The Princess Pantry																Safe
Dishes	Entrée	Pumpkin and Pine Nut Ravioli with Sage Butter Sauce																Safe
Dishes	Main	Eye Fillet with Garlic Spinach and Red Wine Jus																Safe
Dishes	Dessert	White Chocolate Cheesecake with Berry Compote																Safe

==== Elimination House (Group 1) ====
- Episode 9
- Airdate — 12 February
- Description — Being the two bottom scoring teams from Round 1, Stella & Jazzey and Ash & Matty will face off in a Sudden Death Cook-Off. The lower scoring team is eliminated. As part of a format change, the Sudden Death Cook-Off is held in the Elimination House with eight new Group 2 teams invited as the guests and jury. Colin Fassnidge also returned as a mentor for the competing teams, and also act as timekeeper.

Sudden Death Cook-Off Results
Sudden Death Cook-Off 1
Team		Guest Score (out of 80)	Pete's Scores			Manu's Scores			Total (out of 140)	Result
Team		Guest Score (out of 80)	Entrée	Main	Dessert	Entrée	Main	Dessert	Total (out of 140)	Result
WA	Stella & Jazzey	60	9	8	5	8	8	5	103	Safe
Dishes	Entrée	Prawn Saganaki								Safe
Dishes	Main	Salmon with Roasted Vegetables and Lemon Salsa								Safe
Dishes	Dessert	Buttermilk Jelly with Grilled Mango								Safe
QLD	Ash & Matty	45	5	3	4	5	2	3	67	Eliminated
Dishes	Entrée	Corn Fritters with Avocado Salsa								Eliminated
Dishes	Main	Falafels with Yoghurt Flat Bread and Garlic Sauce								Eliminated
Dishes	Dessert	Frangipani Pie								Eliminated

==== Round 2 ====
- Episodes 10 to 17
- Airdate — 13 February to 22 February
- Description — The second group now start their Instant Restaurant round. The same rules from the previous round apply and the two lowest scoring teams compete against each other in a Sudden Death Cook-Off at the Elimination House, where one team will be eliminated.

Instant Restaurant Summary
Group 2
Team and Episode Details		Guest Scores								Pete's Scores			Manu's Scores			Total (out of 140)	Rank	Result
Team and Episode Details		H&A	D&G	D&M	O&V	G&A	M&A	P&L	S&H	Entrée	Main	Dessert	Entrée	Main	Dessert	Total (out of 140)	Rank	Result
TAS	Henry & Anna	-	9	7	8	8	9	8	9	10	9	6	10	8	6	107	4th	Safe
Ep 10	13 February	Black Diamond																Safe
Dishes	Entrée	Whipped Brie with Truffle and Eschallots																Safe
Dishes	Main	Venison with Truffle Mash and Mushroom & Red Wine Sauce																Safe
Dishes	Dessert	Apple, Pear and Walnut Crumble with Vanilla Ice Cream																Safe
SA	Dan & Gemma	7	-	4	5	5	5	4	5	7	5	1	7	7	1	63	6th	Safe
Ep 11	14 February	Leather + Willow																Safe
Dishes	Entrée	Buffalo Chicken Wings with Blue Cheese Sauce																Safe
Dishes	Main	Beef Ribs with Coleslaw, Charred Corn and Lime Mayo																Safe
Dishes	Dessert	Lemon Pudding with Blueberry Ice Cream																Safe
WA	Davide & Marco	8	7	-	8	7	7	7	7	6	10	9	6	8	9	99	5th	Safe
Ep 12	15 February	When in Rome																Safe
Dishes	Entrée	Eggplant Parmigiana with Fennel & Orange Salad																Safe
Dishes	Main	Pesce al Forno with Rosemary Roast Potatoes																Safe
Dishes	Dessert	Bigné																Safe
NSW	Olga & Valeria	9	8	6	-	8	7	9	6	9	9	10	9	8	10	108	3rd	Safe
Ep 13	18 February	Russian Express																Safe
Dishes	Entrée	Kholodets with Beetroot & Horseradish Sauce																Safe
Dishes	Main	Golubtsi (Cabbage Rolls)																Safe
Dishes	Dessert	White Russian																Safe
NSW	Georgie & Alicia	9	9	7	9	-	9	7	9	10	9	9	10	9	7	113	2nd	Safe
Ep 14	19 February	KwokTong																Safe
Dishes	Entrée	Prawn & Shiitake Ravioli with Seafood Broth																Safe
Dishes	Main	Roast Duck with Plum Jam and Papaya Salad																Safe
Dishes	Dessert	Mango Pudding with Coconut Sago and Salted Coconut Mango Ice Cream																Safe
QLD	Matt & Aly	6	4	4	5	4	-	4	5	7	1	6	7	1	6	60	7th	Through to Sudden Death
Ep 15	20 February	On Leave																Through to Sudden Death
Dishes	Entrée	Scallops with Pumpkin Purée and Prosciutto Crisp																Through to Sudden Death
Dishes	Main	Mexican Pulled Pork Tacos																Through to Sudden Death
Dishes	Dessert	Chilli, Chocolate & Caramel Tart																Through to Sudden Death
NSW	Pat & Louisa	5	4	4	4	4	3	-	3	2	4	5	2	4	5	49	8th	Through to Sudden Death
Ep 16	21 February	Gypsy																Through to Sudden Death
Dishes	Entrée	Stuffed Pepper with Tomato Roux																Through to Sudden Death
Dishes	Main	Hungarian Meatballs with Cucumber & Sour Cream Salad																Through to Sudden Death
Dishes	Dessert	Rigó Jancsi Cake																Through to Sudden Death
NSW	Sonya & Hadil	9	8	8	8	8	10	8	-	10	10	7	10	10	8	114	1st	Safe
Ep 17	22 February	Desert Rose																Safe
Dishes	Entrée	Herbed Kibbeh Nayyeh with Pickled Radish																Safe
Dishes	Main	Chargrilled Lamb with Moutabel and Fattoush Salad																Safe
Dishes	Dessert	Knafeh																Safe

==== Elimination House (Group 2) ====
- Episode 18
- Airdate — 26 February
- Description — Being the two bottom scoring teams from Round 2, Matt & Aly and Pat & Louisa will face off against each other in a Sudden Death Cook-Off. The lower scoring team is eliminated. Competing teams will go to the Elimination House where the seven remaining Group 1 teams are invited as the guests and jury.

Sudden Death Cook-Off Results
Sudden Death Cook-Off 2
Team		Guest Score (out of 70)	Pete's Scores			Manu's Scores			Total (out of 130)	Result
Team		Guest Score (out of 70)	Entrée	Main	Dessert	Entrée	Main	Dessert	Total (out of 130)	Result
QLD	Matt & Aly	35	5	6	5	5	6	5	67	Safe
Dishes	Entrée	Seared Tuna & Zucchini Salad								Safe
Dishes	Main	Chunky Beef Pie with Garlic Mash								Safe
Dishes	Dessert	Pineapple Upside Down Cake								Safe
NSW	Pat & Louisa	18	6	2	1	6	2	1	36	Eliminated
Dishes	Entrée	Calamari with Baby Tomato Salad and Aioli								Eliminated
Dishes	Main	Veal Pizzaiola with Baked Thyme Potatoes								Eliminated
Dishes	Dessert	Chocolate Ricotta Cake								Eliminated

=== Top 14 ===
==== Elimination Challenge ====
- Episode 19
- Airdate — 27 February
- Description — All teams headed into the first challenge in a Group 1 vs Group 2 cook-off. In the first round, both groups nominated one team to cook an Aussie BBQ dish. The winning team saved their entire group from elimination. The losing team and their group then faced off individually in a Sudden Death Cook-Off, tasked to create a cultural dish. The team with the worst dish judged by Pete and Manu was eliminated.

Challenge Summary
Team		Dish	Result
Round 1: Aussie BBQ
NSW	Georgie & Alicia	Surf & Turf	Win (Group 2 Safe)
VIC	Kim & Suong	Asian Chicken with Potato Salad	Lose (Group 1 to Sudden Death)
Sudden Death: Cultural Challenge
QLD	Alex & Emily	Chipotle Chicken with Charred Corn and Slaw	Safe
NSW	Jess & Emma	Rosemary Lamb Rack with Potato Bake and Grilled Mushroom	Safe
NSW	Josh & Nic	Arrosticini with Panzanella Salad and Piadina	Safe
VIC	Kim & Suong	Bún Thịt Nướng (Pork Noodle Salad)	Safe
VIC	Roula & Rachel	Lamb Kofta with Fattoush Salad and Tzatziki	Safe
WA	Stella & Jazzey	Sumac Prawns with Chunky Baba Ganoush and Pickled Cucumber	Safe
QLD	Stuss & Steve	Chicken Souvlaki with Pita Bread and Tzatziki	Eliminated

=== Top 13 ===
==== Group 1: High Tea Challenge ====
- Episode 20
- Airdate — 28 February
- Description — Teams from Group 1 cooked and served at a High Tea party. Guests and teams from Group 2 were invited to taste the food and voted for their favourite dish. The team with the most votes won People's Choice and will earn an advantage at the elimination cook-off. Judges Pete and Colin sent the weakest team into Elimination House.

Challenge Summary
Team		Dish	Result
QLD	Alex & Emily	Snapper Ceviche with Avocado Mousse	People's Choice
NSW	Jess & Emma	Sticky Date Pudding with Pecan Praline	Safe
NSW	Josh & Nic	Cheesecake Tart with Lemon Curd	Safe
VIC	Kim & Suong	Chicken & Prawn Spring Rolls with Sweet Chilli Sauce	Safe
WA	Stella & Jazzey	Smoked Trout Tart with Beetroot & Strawberry Relish	Safe
VIC	Roula & Rachael	Chocolate Mousse Shooters with Raspberry and Coconut	Through to Sudden Death

==== Group 2: Medieval Banquet Challenge ====
- Episode 21
- Airdate — 1 March
- Description — Group 2 teams were challenged cook a feast for guests at a medieval-themed event. To fit with the theme, teams cooked with coal stoves and no electrical items were allowed. People's Choice was awarded to the team with the most votes from the guests and Group 1. Pete and Colin sent the weakest team to Elimination House to face Roula and Rachael in Sudden Death.

Challenge Summary
Team		Dish	Result
WA	Davide & Marco	Seared Beef with Beer & Vegetable Stew and Salsa Verde	People's Choice
NSW	Georgie & Alicia	BBQ Turkey with Pumpkin, Charred Brussels Sprouts and Thyme Gravy	Safe
TAS	Henry & Anna	Herbed Quail with Game Bird Sauce and Roast Potatoes	Safe
QLD	Matt & Aly	Beef Rib Roast with Roast Potatoes, Parsnips & Carrots and Red Wine Gravy	Safe
NSW	Olga & Valeria	Georgian Pork Skewers with Grilled Vegetables and Spiced Tomato Sauce	Safe
NSW	Sonya & Hadil	Seafood Platter with Herb Tahini and Charred Chilli Sauce	Safe
SA	Dan & Gemma	Spiced Chicken with Smoky Beans and Stuffed Potatoes	Through to Sudden Death

==== Elimination House (Group Challenge 1) ====
- Episode 22
- Airdate — 5 March
- Description — Roula & Rachael and Dan & Gemma were the weakest teams in the group challenges, will face off in a Sudden Death Cook-Off at Elimination House, where one team is eliminated. All guest teams score both meals out of 10. Alex & Emily and Davide & Marco, as People's Choice winners, had the advantage of having each team member score both meals, meaning their scores would be doubled. Judges Pete and Manu scored each dish out of 10.

Sudden Death Cook-Off Results
Sudden Death Cook-Off 4
Team		Guest Score (out of 130)	Pete's Scores			Manu's Scores			Total (out of 190)	Result
Team		Guest Score (out of 130)	Entrée	Main	Dessert	Entrée	Main	Dessert	Total (out of 190)	Result
SA	Dan & Gemma	95	4	8	8	4	8	8	135	Safe
Dishes	Entrée	Samosa with Raita								Safe
Dishes	Main	Chicken Tikka Masala								Safe
Dishes	Dessert	Crème Brûlée								Safe
VIC	Roula & Rachael	71	6	4	2	6	3	2	94	Eliminated
Dishes	Entrée	Arancini Balls with Chilli Mayonnaise								Eliminated
Dishes	Main	Gnocchi with Tomato & Basil Sauce								Eliminated
Dishes	Dessert	After Dinner Mint								Eliminated

=== Top 12 ===
==== Group 2: Home Delivery Challenge ====
- Episode 23
- Airdate — 6 March
- Description — Group 2 teams ran a home delivery service cooking at a Foodbank depot and then delivering their meals to local customers. Each team prepared two mains and side dishes. Dining customers and Group 1 teams scored the meals out of 10, with the highest scoring team earning People's Choice. Pete and Colin sent the weakest team to the next Elimination House cook-off.

Challenge Summary
Team		Dish	Result
SA	Dan & Gemma	BBQ Pork Ribs / Sticky Sesame Chicken Wings	People's Choice
WA	Davide & Marco	Chilli Mussels / Insalata Di Riso (Rice Salad)	Safe
NSW	Georgie & Alicia	Sweet & Sour Fish / Pork & Chicken San Choy Bau (Lettuce Wraps)	Safe
TAS	Henry & Anna	Scotch Fillet Steak / Crusted Pork Cutlet	Safe
NSW	Olga & Valeria	Dukkah Lamb / Deep Fried Spicy Chicken	Safe
NSW	Sonya & Hadil	Jordanian Sumac Chicken / Filet Mignon	Safe
QLD	Matt & Aly	Lamb & Beetroot Salad / Grilled Chicken	Through to Sudden Death

==== Group 1: Lawn Bowls BBQ Challenge ====
- Episode 24
- Airdate — 7 March
- Description — Group 1 cooked at a lawn bowls club for a BBQ challenge, serving food to the public and Group 2 for votes. The team with the most votes won People's Choice. The judges then sent the weakest team to Elimination House to face Matt & Aly.

Challenge Summary
Team		Dish	Result
QLD	Alex & Emily	Herb Lamb with Tarragon Potatoes and Greek Salad	People's Choice
NSW	Jess & Emma	Steak Sandwich with Caramelised Onions	Safe
VIC	Kim & Suong	Beef and Chicken Skewers with Asian Slaw	Safe
WA	Stella & Jazzey	Beef Burger with Pickled Beetroot and Blue Cheese Sauce	Safe
NSW	Josh & Nic	Fritto Misto	Through to Sudden Death

==== Elimination House (Group Challenge 2) ====
- Episode 25
- Airdate — 8 March
- Description — Matt & Aly and Josh & Nic, who were the weakest teams in the group challenges, will face off in a Sudden Death Cook-Off at Elimination House, where one team is eliminated. All guest teams score both meals out of 10. Dan & Gemma and Alex & Emily, as People's Choice winners, had the advantage of having each team member score both meals, meaning their scores would be doubled. Judges Pete and Manu scored each dish out of 10.

Sudden Death Cook-Off Results
Sudden Death Cook-Off 5
Team		Guest Score (out of 120)	Pete's Scores			Manu's Scores			Total (out of 180)	Result
Team		Guest Score (out of 120)	Entrée	Main	Dessert	Entrée	Main	Dessert	Total (out of 180)	Result
NSW	Josh & Nic	94	8	10	7	6	9	7	141	Safe
Dishes	Entrée	Trippa Alla Calabrese (Calabrian-style tripes)								Safe
Dishes	Main	Tagliatelle Salsiccia e Funghi								Safe
Dishes	Dessert	Tiramisu								Safe
QLD	Matt & Aly	60	3	5	3	3	5	4	83	Eliminated
Dishes	Entrée	Chicken Liver Parfait								Eliminated
Dishes	Main	Lamb Rack with Parsnip Purée and Beetroot								Eliminated
Dishes	Dessert	Chocolate, Fig & Hazelnut Cake								Eliminated

=== Top 11 ===
==== Group 1: Kids Sports Day Challenge ====
- Episode 26
- Airdate — 11 March
- Description — Group 1 teams hit the sports field where they were tasked with creating small, delicious and nutritious meals for 100 active kids using seasonal fresh produce. The kids and Group 2 were asked to vote for their favourite. The team with the most votes was named Kids' Choice. Pete, Colin & guest judge Curtis Stone sent the weakest team to the next Elimination House cook-off.

Challenge Summary
Team		Dish	Result
WA	Stella & Jazzey	Nacho Bowl with Avocado Cream	Kids Choice
NSW	Jess & Emma	Zucchini Slice with Spinach & Citrus Salad	Safe
VIC	Kim & Suong	Pork and Prawn Rice Paper Rolls	Safe
NSW	Josh & Nic	Fish Finger Sliders	Safe
QLD	Alex & Emily	Crunchy Chicken Caesar Cups	Through to Sudden Death

==== Group 2: Asian Street Food Challenge ====
- Episode 27
- Airdate — 12 March
- Description — Group 2 is bringing the heat to Spice Alley, rocking the woks at their very own Asian street food stalls. Teams were asked to make Asian meals to please paying customers. Customer's Choice went to the team that made the most money. Pete and Colin sent the weakest team to the Elimination House Cook-Off.

Challenge Summary
Team		Dish	Result
WA	Davide & Marco	5 Spice Salmon Tortillas with Pickled Slaw	Customer's Choice
NSW	Georgie & Alicia	Fried Chicken with Noodle Salad	Safe
TAS	Henry & Anna	Thai Green Chicken Curry	Safe
NSW	Olga & Valeria	Chill Pan Mee	Safe
NSW	Sonya & Hadil	Banh Tom (Vietnamese Shrimp and Sweet Potato Fritters)	Safe
SA	Dan & Gemma	Chinese Pork & Chive Dumplings with Bok Choy and Garlic & Soy Sauce	Through to Sudden Death

==== Elimination House (Group Challenge 3) ====
- Episode 28
- Airdate — 13 March
- Description — Dan & Gemma and Alex & Emily, who were the weakest teams in the group challenges, will face off in a Sudden Death Cook-Off at Elimination House, where one team is eliminated. All guest teams score both meals out of 10. Stella & Jazzey and Davide & Marco, as People's Choice winners, had the advantage of having each team member score both meals, meaning their scores would be doubled. Judges Pete and Manu scored each dish out of 10.

Sudden Death Cook-Off Results
Sudden Death Cook-Off 6
Team		Guest Score (out of 110)	Pete's Scores			Manu's Scores			Total (out of 170)	Result
Team		Guest Score (out of 110)	Entrée	Main	Dessert	Entrée	Main	Dessert	Total (out of 170)	Result
QLD	Alex & Emily	82	10	9	7	10	8	8	134	Safe
Dishes	Entrée	Roasted Bone Marrow with Brussels Sprouts								Safe
Dishes	Main	Roast Pork with Fennel and Apple Cider Jus								Safe
Dishes	Dessert	Rhubarb & Mulberry Compote with Custard and Crumble								Safe
SA	Dan & Gemma	62	8	6	9	7	6	8	106	Eliminated
Dishes	Entrée	Steak Tartare								Eliminated
Dishes	Main	Roast Lamb with Salt and Vinegar Cabbage								Eliminated
Dishes	Dessert	Fresh Berry Tart								Eliminated

=== Top 10 ===
==== Group 2: Pool Party BBQ Challenge ====
- Episode 29
- Airdate — 14 March
- Description — At a Wet'n'Wild pool party, Group 2 were asked to fire up the BBQ and cook exciting, easy-to-eat food which “screamed summer” and would appeal to fun loving friends and families of all ages. The public and Group 1 were asked to vote for their favourite. Pete and Colin sent the weakest team to the Elimination House Cook-Off.

Challenge Summary
Team		Dish	Result
TAS	Henry & Anna	Pork Burger with Apple & Fennel Slaw	People's Choice
WA	Davide & Marco	Cheesy BBQ Meatballs with Fries	Safe
NSW	Olga & Valeria	Lamb & Pineapple Skewers with Mint Sauce	Safe
NSW	Sonya & Hadil	Spiced Beef & Lamb Pita Pocket	Safe
NSW	Georgie & Alicia	Honey Soy Chicken Wings with Asparagus and Aioli	Through to Sudden Death

==== Group 1: Picnic Challenge ====
- Episode 30
- Airdate — 15 March
- Description — Group 1 were tasked with putting together incredible picnic baskets for around 200 people to enjoy in Centennial Park. The public and Group 2 were asked to vote for their favourite. Pete and Colin sent the weakest team to the Elimination House Cook-Off.

Challenge Summary
Team		Dish	Result
NSW	Josh & Nic	Chicken Schnitzel Focaccia; Whipped Gorgonzola & Caramelised Peach Bruschetta; Strawberries with Chocolate Ganache	People's Choice
WA	Stella & Jazzey	Roast Beef Roll; Devilled Eggs; Spiced Carrot Muffs	Safe
NSW	Jess & Emma	Prawn Roll; Potato Salad; Berry Cake	Safe
VIC	Kim & Suong	Chicken Bánh Mí; Asian Beef Salad; Fruit Salad	Safe
QLD	Alex & Emily	Apple, Mustard & Honey Baked Ham; Kale, Apple & Toasted Seed Salad; Carrots with Orange & Thyme Dressing	Through to Sudden Death

==== Elimination House (Group Challenge 4) ====
- Episode 31
- Airdate — 18 March
- Description — Georgie & Alicia and Alex & Emily, who were the weakest teams in the group challenges, will face off in a Sudden Death Cook-Off at Elimination House, where one team is eliminated. All guest teams score both meals out of 10. Henry & Anna and Josh & Nic, as People's Choice winners, had the advantage of having each team member score both meals, meaning their scores would be doubled. Judges Pete and Manu scored each dish out of 10.

Sudden Death Cook-Off Results
Sudden Death Cook-Off 7
Team		Guest Score (out of 100)	Pete's Scores			Manu's Scores			Total (out of 160)	Result
Team		Guest Score (out of 100)	Entrée	Main	Dessert	Entrée	Main	Dessert	Total (out of 160)	Result
QLD	Alex & Emily	86	7	8	7	9	7	7	131	Safe
Dishes	Entrée	Lobster Tail with Tarragon and Vermouth Butter								Safe
Dishes	Main	Lamb Backstrap with Kale, Onion Purée and Port Jus								Safe
Dishes	Dessert	Rosemary and Balsamic Figs with Caramel and Ricotta								Safe
NSW	Georgie & Alicia	61	10	8	7	9	7	6	108	Eliminated
Dishes	Entrée	Miso Caramel Pork Belly with Spiced Edamame and Pickled Radish								Eliminated
Dishes	Main	Tuna, Mushrooms, Sprouts and Broth								Eliminated
Dishes	Dessert	Sake Poached Nashi Pear with Soy Milk Ice Cream								Eliminated

=== Top 9 ===
==== Group 1: Romantic Dinner Challenge ====
- Episode 32
- Airdate — 19 March
- Description — Group 1 create dishes for romantic dinner. Diners and Group 2 score the teams out of 10. One team was named Lover's Choice. Pete and Colin sent another team to the Elimination House Cook-Off.

Challenge Summary
Team		Dish	Result
Main
QLD	Alex & Emily	Duck with Tamarind and Orange	Lover's Choice
NSW	Josh & Nic	Spicy Basil Trevalla with Citrus Cauliflower	Safe
WA	Stella & Jazzey	King Prawn Pasta with Chilli Oil	Safe
Dessert
NSW	Jess & Emma	Panna Cotta with Poached Maple Figs	Safe
VIC	Kim & Suong	Floating Islands (Poached Meringue with Coconut Crème Anglaise)	Through to Sudden Death

==== Group 2: Shared Lunch Challenge ====
- Episode 33
- Airdate — 20 March
- Description — Group 2 had to create a menu of three savoury plates for a busy lunch service, with Manu serving as Head Chef again. The public and Group 1 score the teams out of 10. One team will be named People's Choice. Pete and Colin sent another team to the Elimination House Cook-Off.

Challenge Summary
Team		Dish	Result
NSW	Olga & Valeria	Russian Potato Salad; Deconstructed Beef Stroganoff; Chicken Kiev Croquettes	People's Choice
TAS	Henry & Anna	Whole Baked Rainbow Trout; Eye Fillet with Salsa Verde; Blue Cheese Stuffed Dates	Safe
NSW	Sonya & Hadil	Chargrilled Tiger Prawns; Wagyu Beef with Roasted Bone Marrow; Pine Nut and Cinnamon Kofta	Safe
WA	Davide & Marco	Octopus Salad; Champagne & Garlic Butter Prawns; Vongole in White Wine Sauce	Through to Sudden Death

==== Elimination House (Group Challenge 5) ====
- Episode 34
- Airdate — 21 March
- Description — Kim & Suong and Davide & Marco, who were the weakest teams in the group challenges, will face off in a Sudden Death Cook-Off at Elimination House, where one team is eliminated. All guest teams score both meals out of 10. Alex & Emily and Olga & Valeria, as People's Choice winners, had the advantage of having each team member score both meals, meaning their scores would be doubled. Judges Pete and Manu scored each dish out of 10.

Sudden Death Cook-Off Results
Sudden Death Cook-Off 8
Team		Guest Score (out of 90)	Pete's Scores			Manu's Scores			Total (out of 150)	Result
Team		Guest Score (out of 90)	Entrée	Main	Dessert	Entrée	Main	Dessert	Total (out of 150)	Result
VIC	Kim & Suong	79	10	10	7	10	10	6	132	Safe
Dishes	Entrée	Chạo Tôm (Sugarcane Prawns)								Safe
Dishes	Main	Canh Chua (Sweet & Sour Soup)								Safe
Dishes	Dessert	Chè Trôi Nước (Sticky Rice Balls with Ginger Syrup)								Safe
WA	Davide & Marco	56	6	6	7	6	6	7	94	Eliminated
Dishes	Entrée	Agnolotti al Sugo								Eliminated
Dishes	Main	Risotto ai Frutti di Mare (Seafood Risotto)								Eliminated
Dishes	Dessert	Zabaione								Eliminated

=== Top 8 → Top 7 ===
==== Supermarket Ice-cream Challenge ====
- Episode 35
- Air date — 15 April
- Description — The two groups are now combined into one and teams must create an ice-cream worth packing for the grocery buying public. The team with the most votes wins People's Choice and will have their ice-cream produced, packaged and sold in Coles supermarkets across Australia. Pete and Colin will decide the bottom team who will receive a penalty in the next challenge.

Challenge Summary
Team		Dish	Result
NSW	Josh & Nic	The Nutty Italian Sundae	People's Choice
NSW	Jess & Emma	French Toast with Salted Caramel Pecan Ice Cream	Safe
QLD	Alex & Emily	Peanut Butter Ice Cream with Banana Caramel and Brownie	Safe
VIC	Kim & Suong	Pancakes with Coconut Ice Cream and Tropical Fruit Sauce	Safe
TAS	Henry & Anna	Coffee Ice Cream Sandwich	Safe
NSW	Sonya & Hadil	Chocolate Turkish Delight Ice Cream with Semolina Cake and Pistachio Biscuit	Safe
NSW	Olga & Valeria	Earl Grey Ice Cream Profiterole	Safe
WA	Stella & Jazzey	Pop-Cone	Penalised

==== Ultimate Instant Restaurants ====
- Episode 36 to 42
- Air date — 16 April to 25 April
- Description — The remaining eight teams headed around the country once again in an Ultimate Instant Restaurant round. All teams had to cook two dishes of each course (entrée, main and dessert) for their fellow contestants and judges for scoring. For the first time, teams are given strict time constraints to prepare and cook each course: 90 minutes for entrée and main and an hour for desserts. Guests have a choice of choosing one of the options per course, while the judges Pete and Manu each taste one of the two options.

Colour Key:
– Judge's Score for Option 1
– Judge's Score for Option 2

Ultimate Instant Restaurant Summary
Top 8
Team and Episode Details			Guest Scores								Pete's Scores			Manu's Scores			Total (out of 130)^{1}	Rank	Result
Team and Episode Details			J&E	H&A	K&S	S&J	A&E	J&N	O&V	~~S&H~~^{1}	Entrée	Main	Dessert	Entrée	Main	Dessert	Total (out of 130)^{1}	Rank	Result
NSW	Jess & Emma		N/A	3	6	4	3	4	5	~~3~~^{1}	3	6	8	5	1	1	49	7th	Eliminated
Ep 36	16 April		The Princess Pantry																Eliminated
Dishes	Entrées	1	Scallops with Cauliflower Purée and Chorizo																Eliminated
Dishes	Entrées	2	Pumpkin & Mozzarella Arancini with Napoli Sauce																Eliminated
Dishes	Mains	1	Moreton Bay Bugs with Camembert Sauce and Saffron Rice																Eliminated
Dishes	Mains	2	Lamb Shanks with Garlic Mash																Eliminated
Dishes	Desserts	1	Apple Pie with Crème Anglaise																Eliminated
Dishes	Desserts	2	Chocolate Crème Brûlée and Candied Orange																Eliminated
TAS	Henry & Anna		7	N/A	8	7	7	7	7	~~5~~^{1}	6	5	3	6	8	10	81	3rd	Safe
Ep 37	17 April		Black Diamond																Safe
Dishes	Entrées	1	Kangaroo Fillet with Pepperberry Sauce																Safe
Dishes	Entrées	2	Beetroot, Feta & Walnut Tart																Safe
Dishes	Mains	1	Chicken with Lemon Roast Potatoes, Green Beans and Mushroom Sauce																Safe
Dishes	Mains	2	Lamb Backstrap with Pea Purée and Onion Jam																Safe
Dishes	Desserts	1	Pavlova with Rhubarb & Strawberries																Safe
Dishes	Desserts	2	Lemon Tart with Blueberry Compote																Safe
VIC	Kim & Suong		6	7	N/A	7	5	7	7	~~7~~^{1}	10	7	1	9	8	4	78	4th	Safe
Ep 38	18 April		Secret Lantern																Safe
Dishes	Entrées	1	Bò Lá Lót (Beef in Betel Leaf)																Safe
Dishes	Entrées	2	Mustard Leaf Soup																Safe
Dishes	Mains	1	Cá Kho Tộ (Clay Pot Caramel Fish)																Safe
Dishes	Mains	2	Tôm Hùm Xào Mì (Tamarind Lobster with Egg Noodles)																Safe
Dishes	Desserts	1	Coconut Jelly																Safe
Dishes	Desserts	2	Deep Fried Ice Cream with Passionfruit Sauce																Safe
WA	Stella & Jazzey^{2}		5	5	5	N/A	5	5	6	—N/a	6	3	2	7	6	2	57	6th	Safe
Ep 39	22 April		The 'Stume Room																Safe
Dishes	Entrées	1	Slow Cooked Octopus with Clams																Safe
Dishes	Entrées	2	Trout Pot with Pickle and Bread																Safe
Dishes	Mains	1	Pheasant with Polenta																Safe
Dishes	Mains	2	Caponata with Fried Goats Cheese and Hazelnuts																Safe
Dishes	Desserts	1	Honey Mousse with Port Jelly																Safe
Dishes	Desserts	2	Self-Saucing Lemon Cake																Safe
QLD	Alex & Emily		7	7	7^{3}	7	N/A	8	8	—N/a	7	9	9	7	8	9	93	1st	Safe
Ep 40	23 April		Love From Miami																Safe
Dishes	Entrées	1	Whiskey Beef Tataki with Kombu Celery																Safe
Dishes	Entrées	2	Chicken Larb Wonton Stack with Crispy Chicken Skin																Safe
Dishes	Mains	1	Lamb Ribs with Wild Rice																Safe
Dishes	Mains	2	Crispy Pork Belly Red Curry with Prik Nam Pla																Safe
Dishes	Desserts	1	Cointreau & Chocolate Mousse with Orange Blossom Pistachio Praline																Safe
Dishes	Desserts	2	Bajan Rum & Coconut Panna Cotta																Safe
NSW	Josh & Nic		6	6	6	6	6	N/A	6	—N/a	8	6	5	9	9	4	77	5th	Safe
Ep 41	24 April		Calcio e Pepe																Safe
Dishes	Entrées	1	Liver with Chilli & Onions																Safe
Dishes	Entrées	2	Stuffed Zucchini Flowers																Safe
Dishes	Mains	1	Spatchcock Diavola																Safe
Dishes	Mains	2	Gnocchi Quattro Formaggi																Safe
Dishes	Desserts	1	Crostata Ricotta																Safe
Dishes	Desserts	2	Red Wine & Cinnamon Poached Pears																Safe
NSW	Olga & Valeria		36^{4}						N/A	—N/a	10	10	8	8	5	10	87	2nd	Safe
Ep 42	25 April		Russian Express																Safe
Dishes	Entrées	1	Chebureki with Tomato Relish																Safe
Dishes	Entrées	2	Dressed Herring Terrine																Safe
Dishes	Mains	1	Solyanka Soup																Safe
Dishes	Mains	2	Ox Tongue in Apple Dough with Porcini Mushrooms																Safe
Dishes	Desserts	1	Pashka with Cranberry Curd																Safe
Dishes	Desserts	2	Izba Cake																Safe

Note:

- ^1 – Sonya and Hadil were dismissed from the competition after episode 38. Following this dismissal, their guest scores were removed from the entire round and therefore the total score changed from 130 to 120. Initially they scored at the first two instant restaurants and an average score was calculated for Kim and Suong's.
- ^2 – As a penalty for creating the weakest dish at the ice-cream challenge, Stella and Jazzey had five minutes of cooking time removed for each course.
- ^3 – Suong fell ill and was taken away in an ambulance just before scoring, hence Kim scored on behalf of them both.
- ^4 – Individual guest scores were not revealed.

=== Top 6 - Quarter Finals ===
The Top 6 teams meet at Kitchen Headquarters to compete in four Quarter Final challenges to determine the teams entering the Semi-Final round. One team advances after each night until the Top 4 semi-finalists are decided and two teams will be eliminated.

==== Quarter Final 1 ====
- Episode 43
- Air date — 26 April
- Description — The challenge for the first round was to "Master the Disaster" and replicate another teams dish and improve on it. Teams had up 75 minutes, but were deducted three minutes each based on where they finished in the Ultimate Instant Restaurants. The two winners faced-off in a second to determine who would be the first to the semi-finals. In the second round, the two winners had to repeat one of their own dishes.

Round 1: Master the Disaster
Team		Time	Dish	Result
QLD	Alex & Emily	75 mins	Sirloin with Mash, Greens and Red Wine Jus (Jess & Emma)	Winners (Through to Round 2)
NSW	Josh & Nic	63 mins	Chilli Seafood Risotto with Gremolata (Davide & Marco)	Winners (Through to Round 2)
TAS	Henry & Anna	69 mins	Herb Crusted Lamb with Potatoes and Asparagus Salad (Alex & Emily)	Through to Quarter Final 2
VIC	Kim & Suong	66 mins	Fried Rice with Honey Soy Chicken and Stir Fry Asian Greens (Georgie & Alicia)	Through to Quarter Final 2
NSW	Olga & Valeria	72 mins	Reuben Sandwich (Jess & Emma)	Through to Quarter Final 2
WA	Stella & Jazzey	60 mins	Lamb Backstrap with Wasabi Pea Puree and Red Wine Jus (Henry & Anna)	Through to Quarter Final 2

Round 2: Second Chance Challenge
Team		Dish	Result
NSW	Josh & Nic	Spatchcock alla Diavola	Through to the Semi-Finals
QLD	Alex & Emily	Ceviche with Tiger's Milk Shot	Through to Quarter Final 2

==== Quarter Final 2 ====
- Episode 44
- Air date — 29 April
- Description — The challenge for the first round was to prepare "cheap eats," the teams had 45 minutes to create a top dish that "feeds a family well at a price we can afford using value ingredients." The two best teams then faced-off in a second round where they were tasked to use high-end, luxury ingredients and had to complete in an hour. The winner earned the second spot into the semi-finals.

Round 1: Value Challenge
Team		Dish	Result
QLD	Alex & Emily	Crispy Skin Salmon with Poor Man’s Parmesan	Winners (Through to Round 2)
WA	Stella & Jazzey	Roast Chilli Chicken with Panzanella Salad and Herb Cream	Winners (Through to Round 2)
NSW	Olga & Valeria	Russian Scotch Egg with Lentil Stir Fry	Through to Quarter Final 3
TAS	Henry & Anna	Lamb Rump with Cauliflower Two Ways	Through to Quarter Final 3
VIC	Kim & Suong	Vietnamese Chicken Ragù	Through to Quarter Final 3

Round 2: High-End Challenge
Team		Dish	Result
QLD	Alex & Emily	Wagyu Steak with Mushroom Ragù, Duck Fat Kipflers and White Truffle	Through to the Semi-Finals
WA	Stella & Jazzey	Seared Tuna with Radicchio & Fennel Salad with Black Olive Dressing	Through to Quarter Final 3

==== Quarter Final 3 ====
- Episode 45
- Air date — 30 April
- Description — The challenge for the first round was to prepare a three course meal in two hours, using dairy products. The two best teams then faced-off in a second round where they cooked a dish of their choice. The winner earned the third spot into the semi-finals.

Round 1
Team		Dishes			Result
Team		Entrée	Main	Dessert	Result
WA	Stella & Jazzey	Baked Cheese Bruschetta with Pear Chutney	Eye Fillet with Oyster Cream	White Chocolate Mousse with Raspberries	Winners (Through to Round 2)
VIC	Kim & Suong	Creamy Lobster Chowder	Grilled Blue Eye with Beurre Blanc Sauce	Crêpes with Berry Compote and Whipped Cream	Winners (Through to Round 2)
NSW	Olga & Valeria	Akroshka (Cold Buttermilk Soup)	Yozhiki with Braised Barley	Guriev Kasha	Through to Quarter Final 4
TAS	Henry & Anna	Three-Cheese Soufflé	Blue Cheese Quiche	Gin & Lemon Cheesecake	Through to Quarter Final 4

Round 2
Team		Dish	Result
VIC	Kim & Suong	Seafood Congee	Through to the Semi-Finals
WA	Stella & Jazzey	Crispy Skin Barramundi with Cauliflower Purée and Olive Tapenade	Through to Quarter Final 4

==== Quarter Final 4 ====
- Episode 46
- Air date — 1 May
- Description — The three remaining teams were challenged to deliver a three course meal. The judges choose the types of courses they served: a soup for entrée in one hour, a roast for main in 90 minutes and a pastry for dessert in 30 minutes. For the first time in the My Kitchen Rules series, there was a double elimination.

Quarterfinal 4
Team		Dishes			Result
Team		Entrée	Main	Dessert	Result
WA	Stella & Jazzey	Mexican Seafood Soup	Furikake Lamb Rack with Carrot Ginger Puree and Miso Butter	Pear & Blueberry Pie with Espresso Cream	Through to the Semi-Finals
TAS	Henry & Anna	Onion Soup with Truffle Cheese Toastie	Pork Belly Sunday Roast	Custard Tart with Berry Compote	Eliminated
NSW	Olga & Valeria	Borscht	Roast Duck with Cherry Sauce^{1}	Paris-Brest	Eliminated

Note
^1 – The original roast duck was overcooked, hence a fried duck was used. This was against the brief.

=== Semi-finals ===
==== Semi-final 1 ====
- Episode 47
- Airdate — 2 May
- Description — Josh & Nic being the first team to advance to the Semi Finals faced off against Kim & Suong the third team to advance to the Semi-Finals.

Semi-Final Cook-Off Results
Semi-Final 1
Team		Judge's Scores						Total (out of 60)	Result
Team		Karen	Guy	Liz	Colin	Pete	Manu	Total (out of 60)	Result
VIC	Kim & Suong	9	8	8	8	8	8	49	Through to Grand Final
Dishes	Entrée	Fried Lemongrass Fish (Ca Chien Xa)							Through to Grand Final
Dishes	Main	Prawn & Pork Noodle Soup (Hu Tieu)							Through to Grand Final
Dishes	Dessert	Steamed Layer Cake (Bánh Da Lợn)							Through to Grand Final
NSW	Josh & Nic	8	8	7	7	7	8	45	Eliminated
Dishes	Entrée	Grilled Sardines							Eliminated
Dishes	Main	Pappardelle with Beef Ragù							Eliminated
Dishes	Dessert	Coffee Burdino with Chocolate Ice Cream and Amaretti							Eliminated

==== Semi-final 2 ====
- Episode 48
- Airdate — 3 May
- Description — Alex & Emily competed against Stella & Jazzey.

Semi-Final Cook-Off Results
Semi-Final 2
Team		Judge's Scores						Total (out of 60)	Result
Team		Karen	Guy	Liz	Colin	Pete	Manu	Total (out of 60)	Result
QLD	Alex & Emily	8	8	9	9	10	9	53	Through to Grand Final
Dishes	Entrée	Prawn & Pork Toast with Lemon Chilli Mayo and Nuoc Cham							Through to Grand Final
Dishes	Main	Mussels & Pippies with Nahm Prik Pao							Through to Grand Final
Dishes	Dessert	Mango Sorbet with Yoghurt Parfait and Macadamia Crumble							Through to Grand Final
WA	Stella & Jazzey	6	6	6	6	7	6	37	Eliminated
Dishes	Entrée	Smoked Moreton Bay Bugs with Onion Purée and Radish							Eliminated
Dishes	Main	Herb Salmon with Eggplant Purée and Couscous							Eliminated
Dishes	Dessert	Banoffee Bizarre^{1}							Eliminated

Note:

- ^1 – Stella & Jazzey's dessert was originally Dulce De Leche Ice Cream with Popcorn, but was changed due to complications with the dish.

=== Grand Finale ===
- Episode 49
- Airdate — 6 May
- Description — Each finalist cooked a five-course meal, with 20 plates per course for the thirteen eliminated teams, friends and family. The guest judges then scored their dishes for a final verdict.

Grand Final Results
Grand Final
Team		Judge's Scores						Total (out of 60)	Result
Team		Karen	Guy	Liz	Colin	Pete	Manu	Total (out of 60)	Result
QLD	Alex & Emily	9	9	10	9	9	9	55	Winners
Dishes		Love From Miami							Winners
1st Course		Tuna Tartare with Cumin & Harissa Oil							Winners
2nd Course		Jamón Wrapped Lamb Brains with Caper Mayonnaise							Winners
3rd Course		Moroccan Lobster with Cauliflower and Citrus Tahini Dressing							Winners
4th Course		Pork Belly with Sprouts, Apple and Calvados Sauce							Winners
5th Course		Penicillin							Winners
VIC	Kim & Suong	9	9	8	9	9	8	52	Runners-up
Dishes		Secret Lantern							Runners-up
1st Course		Wagyu in Mustard Leaf							Runners-up
2nd Course		Quail with Vietnamese XO Sauce							Runners-up
3rd Course		Tiger Prawns with Red Sauce							Runners-up
4th Course		Vietnamese Beef Stew							Runners-up
5th Course		Coconut Crème Caramel with Citrus Salad							Runners-up

== Ratings ==
Colour Key:
– Highest rating in series
– Lowest rating in series
– Elimination episode
– Finals week

Week	Episode		Air date	Viewers (millions) (Note: Ratings data used is from OzTAM and represents the live and same day average viewership from the 5 largest Australian metropolitan centres (Sydney, Melbourne, Brisbane, Perth and Adelaide).)	Nightly rank	Source
1	1	Instant Restaurant 1-1: Josh & Nic	Monday, 29 January	1.182	1	
1	2	Instant Restaurant 1-2: Alex & Emily	Tuesday, 30 January	1.062	1	
1	3	Instant Restaurant 1-3: Roula & Rachael	Wednesday, 31 January	1.078	1	
2	4	Instant Restaurant 1-4: Kim & Suong	Sunday, 4 February	1.104	1	
2	5	Instant Restaurant 1-5: Ash & Matty	Monday, 5 February	1.106	1	
2	6	Instant Restaurant 1-6: Stuss & Steve	Tuesday, 6 February	1.196	1	
2	7	Instant Restaurant 1-7: Stella & Jazzey	Wednesday, 7 February	1.140	1	
3	8	Instant Restaurant 1-8: Jess & Emma	Sunday, 11 February	1.162	2	
3	9	Sudden Death Cook-Off 1	Monday, 12 February	1.097	2	
3	10	Instant Restaurant 2-1: Henry & Anna	Tuesday, 13 February	1.025	2	
3	11	Instant Restaurant 2-2: Dan & Gemma	Wednesday, 14 February	0.930	3	
3	12	Instant Restaurant 2-3: Davide & Marco	Thursday, 15 February	0.947	2	
4	13	Instant Restaurant 2-4: Olga & Valeria	Sunday, 18 February	1.139	2	
4	14	Instant Restaurant 2-5: Georgie & Alicia	Monday, 19 February	1.121	2	
4	15	Instant Restaurant 2-6: Matt & Aly	Tuesday, 20 February	0.988	2	
4	16	Instant Restaurant 2-7: Pat & Louisa	Wednesday, 21 February	0.946	2	
4	17	Instant Restaurant 2-8: Sonya & Hadil	Thursday, 22 February	1.118	1	
5	18	Sudden Death Cook-Off 2	Monday, 26 February	1.074	2	
5	19	Top 14: BBQ Challenge & Sudden Death Cook-Off 3	Tuesday, 27 February	1.116	2	
5	20	Top 13 - Group 1: High Tea Challenge	Wednesday, 28 February	0.981	2	
5	21	Top 13 - Group 2: Medieval Challenge	Thursday, 1 March	1.043	1	
6	22	Sudden Death Cook-Off 4	Monday, 5 March	1.064	2	
6	23	Top 12 - Group 2: Home Delivery Challenge	Tuesday, 6 March	1.013	2	
6	24	Top 12 - Group 1: BBQ Bowling Challenge	Wednesday, 7 March	0.977	2	
6	25	Sudden Death Cook-Off 5	Thursday, 8 March	0.954	1	
7	26	Top 11 - Group 1: Kids Sports Day Challenge	Sunday, 11 March	0.858	4	
7	27	Top 11 - Group 2: Spice Alley Asian Challenge	Monday, 12 March	0.926	6	
7	28	Sudden Death Cook-Off 6	Tuesday, 13 March	1.032	2	
7	29	Top 10 - Group 2: Pool Party Challenge	Wednesday, 14 March	0.963	2	
7	30	Top 10 - Group 1: Picnic Challenge	Thursday, 15 March	0.945	1	
8	31	Sudden Death Cook-Off 7	Sunday, 18 March	1.061	2	
8	32	Top 9 - Group 1: Date Night Challenge	Monday, 19 March	0.996	3	
8	33	Top 9 - Group 2: Shared Lunch Challenge	Tuesday, 20 March	0.970	2	
8	34	Sudden Death Cook-Off 8	Wednesday, 21 March	0.936	4	
9	35	Top 8 - Supermarket Ice-cream Challenge	Sunday, 15 April	1.305	2	
9	36	Top 8 - Ultimate Instant Restaurant 1: Jess & Emma	Monday, 16 April	1.253	1	
9	37	Top 8 - Ultimate Instant Restaurant 2: Henry & Anna	Tuesday, 17 April	1.317	1	
9	38	Top 8 - Ultimate Instant Restaurant 3: Kim & Suong	Wednesday, 18 April	1.623	1	
10	39	Top 7 - Ultimate Instant Restaurant 4: Stella & Jazzey	Sunday, 22 April	1.288	1	
10	40	Top 7 - Ultimate Instant Restaurant 5: Alex & Emily	Monday, 23 April	1.330	1	
10	41	Top 7 - Ultimate Instant Restaurant 6: Josh & Nic	Tuesday, 24 April	1.029	2	
10	42	Top 7 - Ultimate Instant Restaurant 7: Olga & Valeria	Wednesday, 25 April	1.148	3	
10	43	Top 6 - Quarter Final 1	Thursday, 26 April	1.070	1	
11	44	Top 6 - Quarter Final 2	Sunday, 29 April	1.161	2	
11	45	Top 6 - Quarter Final 3	Monday, 30 April	1.103	1	
11	46	Top 6 - Quarter Final 4	Tuesday, 1 May	1.229	1	
11	47	Semi-Final 1	Wednesday, 2 May	1.221	1	
11	48	Semi-Final 2	Thursday, 3 May	1.185	1	
12	49	Grand Final	Sunday, 6 May	1.368	2	
12	49	Grand Final - Winner Announced	Sunday, 6 May	1.543	1	
