= Bella =

- Pronunciation: beh-lah
- Gender: Female
- Language: Italian, English

Origin
- Meaning: "beauty"
- Region of origin: Italy, Spain, Greece

Other names
- Anglicisation: Belle
- Derivatives: Isabella, Isabelle, Bella, Belle, Annabella, Annabelle, Bellalina, Arabella

Bella is a feminine given name. It is a diminutive or nickname form of names ending in -bella, including Izabella and Isabella. However, it can also derive, unrelatedly, from the Italian, Spanish, Portuguese and (ultimately) Latin words for "beautiful". In French, Belle is a name and word meaning beautiful.

This name has increased in usage following the publication of the Twilight book series by American novelist Stephenie Meyer.

== Notable people ==
- Bella A. Burnasheva, Soviet-Russian astronomer
- Bella Abzug (1920–1998), American politician
- Bella Agossou, Beninese actress
- Bella Akhmadulina, Soviet-Russian poet and short story writer
- Bella Alarie, American basketball player
- Bella Alten (1877–1962), Polish opera singer
- Bella Alubo, Nigerian musician
- Bella Andersson, Swedish footballer
- Bella Andre, American author
- Bella Angara, Filipina politician
- Bella Armstrong, New Zealand cricketer
- Bella Astillah, Malaysian singer and actress
- Bella Awa Gassama, Gambian actress
- Bella Ayre, Australian rules footballer
- Bella bat R. Jakob Perlhefter (c.1650–1709), Praguer writer
- Bella Bathurst, English writer
- Bella Bautista, American beauty pageant titleholder
- Bella Bayliss, British triathlete
- Bella Belen, Filipino volleyball player
- Bella Bell-Gam, Nigerian pentathlete
- Bella Bellow (1945–1973), Togolese singer
- Bella Bixby, American soccer player
- Bella Blue, American burlesque dancer
- Bella Bordy (1909–1978), Hungarian actress
- Bella Brisel (1929–1982), Israeli painter and graphic artist
- Bella Bruck (1911–1982), American character actress
- Bella Burge (1888–1967), American-British actress
- Bella Campos, Brazilian actress and model
- Bella Carmelo (born 2000), Brazilian politician
- Bella Clara Landauer (1874–1960), American collector
- Bella Clara Ventura, Columbian director and screenwriter
- Bella Cortez, Cuban actress and dancer
- Bella d'Amichi (fl.1245–1282), Italian noble
- Bella Darvi (1928–1971), Polish actress
- Bella Davidovich, Soviet and American pianist
- Bella Dayne, German actress
- Bella Dela Cruz, Filipino economist
- Bella Dodd (1904–1969), American teacher and lawyer
- Bella Dorita (1901–2001), Spanish singer and dancer
- Bella Duffy (1849–1926), Irish translator and writer
- Bella Eddey, Australian rules footballer
- Bella Emberg (1937–2018), English actress
- Bella Fanale, American ice hockey player
- Bella Feldman (1930–2024), American sculptor
- Bella Ferraro, Australian singer
- Bella Flores (1929–2013), Filipino actress
- Bella Forsgrén, Finnish politician
- Bella French Swisher (1837–1893), American writer
- Bella Freud, British fashion designer
- Bella Fromm (1890–1972), German journalist
- Bella Galhos, East Timorese activist
- Bella Gesser, Israeli chess player
- Bella Gonçalves, Brazilian politician
- Bella Goodall (1851–1884), English actress
- Bella Guerin (1858–1923), Australian activist
- Bella Hadid, American fashion model
- Bella Hall Gauld (1878–1961), Canadian pianist
- Bella Hammond (1932–2020), American activist
- Bella Hardy, English musical artist
- Bella Heathcote, Australian actress
- Bella Horwitz, 18th-century Bohemian Yiddish writer
- Bella Hristova, Bulgarian-American violinist
- Bella Hull, English comedian
- Bella Hvatskin, Russian-born Israeli artist
- Bella Jakubiak, Australian self-taught cook
- Bella James, New Zealand cricketer
- Bella Jarrett (1926–2007), American novelist
- Bella Jimenez, Ecuadorian politician
- Bella Joseph, American Government official
- Bella Kay, American singer-songwriter
- Bella Keyzer (1922–1992), Scottish weaver
- Bella Khotenashvili, Georgian chess grandmaster
- Bella Kocharyan, Armenian First Lady
- Bella Kurkova (1935–2023), Soviet journalist
- Bella Lewis, Australian rules footballer
- Bella Lewitzky (1916–2004), American choreographer and dancer
- Bella Li, Chinese-born American poet
- Bella Longuinho, Brazilian digital influencer
- Bella MacCallum (1886–1927), New Zealand-British botanist and mycologist
- Bella Mackie, English novelist and journalist
- Bella Maclean, British actress
- Bella Milo, Samoan rugby union player
- Bella Murekatete, Rwandan basketball player
- Bella Mysell (1902–1991), American actress
- Bella Nagy (1879–1947), Hungarian actress
- Bella Nisan, Russian ophthalmotologist
- Bella Ouellette (1886–1945), Canadian actress
- Bella Paalen (1881–1964), Australian opera singer
- Bella Paige, Australian singer
- Bella Paredes, Ecuadorian weightlifter
- Bella Pasquali, Australian athlete
- Bella Poarch, American media personality
- Bella Ramsey, English actress
- Bella Ratchinskaia, Russian ballet dancer
- Bella Reay (1900–1979), English footballer
- Bella Rodriguez-Torres (2002–2013), American cancer victim
- Bella Rosenfeld (1889–1944), Russian writer
- Bella Salomon (1749–1824), German collector
- Bella Santiago, Filipino-Romanian singer
- Bella Sember, American soccer player
- Bella Shaw, American journalist
- Bella Shepard, American actress
- Bella Shmurda, Nigerian singer-songwriter
- Bella Shteinbuk, Israeli pianist
- Bella Shumiatcher, Russian musical artist
- Bella Sidney Woolf (1877–1960), English author
- Bella Sims, American swimmer
- Bella Smith, Australian rules footballer
- Bella Starace Sainati (1878–1958), Italian actress
- Bella Subbotovskaya (1937–1982), Russian mathematician
- Bella Taylor Smith, Australian musician
- Bella Thomasson (1874–1959), British bookmaker
- Bella Thorne, American actress
- Bella Tovey (1926–2019), Holocaust survivor
- Bella van der Spiegel-Hage, Dutch professional cyclist
- Bella Verano, Spanish politician
- Bella White, Canadian-American singer-songwriter
- Bella Ysmael, Filipino model
- Bella Zilfa Spencer (1840–1867), English-born American novelist
- Bella Zur, Israeli Paralympic athlete

== Other ==
- Bella (deer), a tamed American deer

== See also ==
- Bella, surname
