= Bella (surname) =

Bella is an Italian surname. Notable people with this name include the following:

- Ahmed Ben Bella (1918–2012), third President of Algeria
- Angelica Bella (born 1968), Hungarian pornographic actress
- Eva Bella (born 2002), American voice actress
- Fatima Zohra Bella, First Lady of Algeria
- Gianni Bella (born 1946), Italian composer and singer-songwriter
- Ivan Bella (born 1964), Slovak Air Force officer and cosmonaut
- Iván Bella (born 1989), Argentine footballer
- Ján Levoslav Bella (1843–1936), Slovak composer, conductor and music teacher
- Lauren Bella (born 2000), Australian rules footballer
- Marcella Bella (born 1952), Italian singer
- Martin Bella (born 1964), Australian rugby league footballer
- Michael Bella (born 1945), German footballer
- Rachael Bella (born 1984), American actress
- Stefano della Bella (1610–1664), Italian printmaker
- Vincenzo La Bella (1872–1954), Italian painter
- V.J. Bella (born 1927), member of the Louisiana House of Representatives
- The Bella Twins, a pair of American professional wrestlers and twin sisters:
  - Brie Bella (born 1983), ring name of Brianna Danielson (née Garcia-Colace)
  - Nikki Bella (born 1983), ring name of Nicole Garcia-Colace

== See also ==
- Bella (disambiguation)
- Bella
- Della Bella
- DiBella (disambiguation)
- Di Bella
