= Della Bella =

Della Bella is an Italian surname. Notable people with this name include the following:

- Giano Della Bella (c. 1240 - before 1306), a Florentine politician during the Republic of Florence
- Paolo Della Bella (born 1977), a Swiss former professional ice hockey goaltender
- Stefano della Bella (1610 – 1664), an Italian draughtsman and printmaker

== See also ==
- Bella (surname)
- Di Bella
- DiBella (disambiguation)
