= Ouellet =

Ouellet is a French Canadian surname common in Quebec; it traces back to a common ancestor, René Hoûallet, who came to New France at Rivière-Ouelle in the 17th century. The surname exists also in other forms: Ouellette, Ouellon, Houal(l)et, Willett(e).

Notable people with the name include:

- André Ouellet (b. 1939), Canadian politician
- Carl Ouellet (b. 1967), Canadian wrestler
- Christian Ouellet (b. 1934), Canadian politician
- David George Ouellet (1944–1967), American Medal of Honor recipient
- Fernand Ouellet (1926–2021), Canadian author and educator
- Henri Roger Ouellet (1938–1999), Canadian ornithologist
- Jean-Pierre Ouellet (b. 1946), Canadian politician from New Brunswick
- Maili-Jade Ouellet (b. 2002), Canadian chess player
- Marc Ouellet (b. 1944), Roman Catholic cardinal
- Martine Ouellet (b. 1969), Canadian politician from Québéc
- Maryse Ouellet (b. 1983), Canadian wrestler
- Maxime Ouellet (b. 1981), Canadian ice hockey player
- Michel Ouellet (b. 1982), Canadian ice hockey player
- Rafaël Ouellet, Canadian screenwriter and film director
- Réal Ouellet (1935–2022), Canadian writer and academic
- Xavier Ouellet (b. 1993), Canadian ice hockey player

== See also ==
- USS Ouellet (FF-1077)
- Ouellette (disambiguation)
