= Russia-1 =

Russian television channel

Russia-1 Россия-1
- Country: Russia
- Broadcast area: Nationwide
- Headquarters: 5th Yamskogo Polya Street, 19-21, Moscow, Russia

Programming
- Language: Russian
- Picture format: 1080i HDTV
- Timeshift service: Russia-1 +2, Russia-1 +4, Russia-1 +6, Russia-1 +8

Ownership
- Owner: VGTRK
- Sister channels: Russia-K, Russia-24, RTR-Planeta

History
- Launched: 14 February 1956; 70 years ago 13 May 1991; 35 years ago (as present)
- Replaced: Programme Two (1956–1991)
- Former names: 1991: Russian Television; 1991–2002: RTR; 2002–2010: Russia (Note: Name still in use for commercial references)

Links
- Website: russia.tv

Availability

Terrestrial
- Digital terrestrial television: Channel 2

Streaming media
- vgtrk.ru/russiatv (Most programs can be seen outside of Russia too)

Russia-1 (Russian: Россия-1, romanized: Rossiya-odin) is a state-owned Russian television channel, first aired on 14 February 1956 as Programme Two in the Soviet Union. It was relaunched as RTR on 13 May 1991, and is known as Russia-1. It is the flagship channel of the All-Russia State Television and Radio Broadcasting Company (VGTRK).

In 2008 Russia-1 had the second largest audience in Russian television. In a typical week, it was viewed by 75% of urban Russians, compared to 83% for the leading channel, Channel One. The two channels are similar in their politics, and they compete directly in entertainment. Russia-1 has many regional variations and broadcasts in many languages.

== History ==
=== Soviet period ===
Russia-1 started broadcasting as The Second Moscow Programme (Programme Two) in 1956. From the very start, it only hosted programs produced by the Ministry of Education of the Soviet Union, as well as children's programming, in monochrome. The move to a new channel frequency resulted in it being renamed Program 2 and becoming the second home of the national newscast Vremya since 1968.

Program 2 officially renamed itself All-Union Program 2 in 1972 and converted to color in 1975, and two years later became a nationwide station, being broadcast all over the Soviet Union. On January 1, 1982 AUP2 officially began to broadcast, not just educational and children's programming but also culture and arts programming and sports, as it was officially permitted to take greater account of the needs and tastes of spectators in a changing era. In addition, it broadcast also documentaries, music videos and programming, and movies.

Starting New Year's Day 1984, All Union Program 2 was renamed All-Union Channel 2 (AUC2), and it pioneered the first ever rhythmic gymnastics broadcast the following year. By 1987, it was also the first channel to adopt sign language interpretation in the USSR and later supplemented by subtitles for the hard of hearing, all for its Vremya simulcasts.

The official identification package for the channel was the star of the second antenna on a blue background with moving rings, symbolizing the radio waves, and the signature at the bottom of "II program", which then changed to "TV USSR." Around February 1988, a new ident replaced it: circles were fixed, disappeared inscription "TV USSR", and the background was light blue with a white gradient.

Since 1989, the Russian Soviet Federative Socialist Republic (RSFSR) implemented the organization of the Russian national TV channel. By this time all the Union republics, with the exception of Russia, had their own TV channels. In 1990, the creator of the program "The Fifth Wheel", People's Deputy of the Supreme Soviet of the RSFSR Bella Kurkova requested the Chairman of the Supreme Soviet of Russia, Boris Yeltsin to create a separate Russian television station for the RSFSR, due to the fact that the central television channels reflect the views of the federal authorities. At that time, the country experienced a confrontation between the union and republican authorities.

On 13 July 1990 a decision of the Supreme Soviet of Russia ended the national monopoly on radio and television broadcasting in the RSFSR, clearing the way for it to launch its own TV and radio stations. Prior to September 15, 1990, according to the decree, the Cabinet of Ministers of the RSFSR, Supreme Soviet of the RSFSR, and the CM Committee on the media, communications with public organizations, mass movements of citizens and public opinion research should address the issue of the ownership of the material-technical base of AUC2. On July 14, 1990 decree № 107-1 of the Presidium of the Supreme Soviet of the RSFSR officially established the All-Russia State Television and Radio Broadcasting Company. Chairman of the Council of Ministers of the RSFSR Ivan Silaev helped acquire the building and the equipment for the future station.

Thus, Russia-1 is the successor to the Soviet Second Programme launched in 1956. As of 2000, it is headed by Oleg Dobrodeyev, who was a founder of the original NTV.

=== Russian Federation ===
After 27 years, the All-Union State Television and Radio Broadcasting Company turned over the operations of AUC2 on March 6, 1991 to the All-Russian State Television and Radio Broadcasting Company, with Oleg Poptsov as its founding chairman. At the same time, the leadership of the company had been promised at least a 6-hour broadcast day as a national blocktimer for viewers within Russia, including a brand-new 20-minute newscast to be aired twice daily on the new channel. Due to the opposition views of the Republican team, the new management staff, led by the new GM for the soon to be re-branded Russian Television, Sergei Podgorbunsky, faced difficulties ranging from an inability to rent a studio in the Ostankino Television Centre to failure to provide new programs at the expected time.

At the same time, there were problems with the recruitment of new employees, program presenters and staff for the new station. Many presenters left the Union STRC free from TV censorship. As a result, the station management started to brainstorm and conceptualize its programming from scratch, including news and current affairs. Thus, "Vesti", the news program of RTV, was born, with airing time being at 18:00 and 20:00, twice nightly on weekdays (The 2nd edition was to be aired before its simulcast of Vremya). Most of the staff of "Vesti" on "Russian Television" were former presenters and staff of Soviet Central Television channel "Television News Service", their experience would help the new channel in its news services. Four studios - "News" for newscasts, "Republic" for current affairs, "Lad" for arts and culture and "Artel" for entertainment and lifestyle were created.

On 13 May 1991, recently appointed to the post of deputy general manager of the State Television and Radio Valentin Lazutkin officially launched the brand new ARSTV Channel 2 with air times from 11.35 to 13.35, from 17.00 to 19.00 and from 21.45 to 23.45 (six hours a day total), weekdays and weekends, with AUC2 filling the rest of the schedule. It was given a new corporate logo and a new brand name: "Russian Television". In its first hour on air, the channel criticized Gorbachov.

At 17.00 the Western-style newscast "Vesti" made its premiere telecast, with Svetlana Sorokina hosting. Items included destruction in an Armenian village and an interview with the Lithuanian president about possible repression from the Kremlin. From this time on Russian Television aired programming not only from the All-Union State Television and Radio but also from the All-Russian State Television and Radio Broadcasting Company. Compared with "Vremya", "Vesti" became the acute, short, specific and operational newscast Russians watched, without any censorship or bias. In the first week of broadcasting, "Good Night, Little Ones!" (beginning in 2002) and Odesa "Gentleman show" made their premiere telecasts. Two weeks later, "RTR" ("Russian Television and Radio") became the new name of the channel, and a new logo debuted.

In August 1991, RTR stopped broadcasting in Latvia and was replaced by LTV2 (now LTV7).

During the August coup, on 19 August 1991 the Emergency Committee stopped the broadcast of RTR, and AUC2 officially returned in the evening slots, with its planned programs including the great ballet "Swan Lake". Unknown to the coup leaders, RTR secretly organized a broadcast to the United States and other countries, as well as all over the USSR, so that all Soviets saw a special edition of "Vesti" with the latest events in Moscow during the coup. Studio "Vesti" in the "Ostankino" Center was blocked by AUC2 management, the transfer was recorded on video tape to "Shabolovke" for emergency situations has been prepared by an OB van and outside mobile facilities that the young channel had. The Emergency Committee blocked RTR headquarters on Yamskov field. In less than a few days, RTR had Clandestine broadcasts nationwide till the coup had failed. After the August Coup "RTR" by order of Valentin Lazutkin, its deputy GM for operations, officially resumed broadcasting this time from 19.00 to 00.00 (instead of 17.00 to 19.00 and 21.45 to 23.45).

On 16 September 1991, AUC2 ended its operations and RTR absorbed several of its staff and programs, therefore beginning the next day it began to broadcast from the very morning till late at midnight. On 30 December 1991 the program "Vesti" began to appear three times a day, and from 20 January 1992 to four times a day. In 1993, the channel changed its logo 2 times.

In February 1992, utilizing the frequencies of RTR in Ukraine, channel UT-2 (now 1 +1) was launched.

During the political crisis of 1993 RTR aired interviews from the different sides of the spectrum, from politicians to ordinary people. During the shooting of the White House, the director of the channel had violated the order to conduct the bombing broadcast live on that point, as long as the line of fire to avoid civilian casualties among the citizens of Moscow. After the police pushed the townspeople, "RTR" started broadcasting "CNN". At that time the building was shelled, which housed the studio of "Vesti". In a hole punched in the building of a grenade launcher, armed men broke into the studios and began shelling the building on fire.

The director of the program "Vesti" Irina Vinogradova was able to save the footage. Technical Director Stanislav Bunevich able to carry TV broadcasts control of the country in building the All-Russian STRC on Yamskov field. Broadcasting channel was restored, "RTR" was the only television channel, remaining on the air and which showed the 1993 First Deputy Prime Minister of Russia Vladimir Shumeyko "Vesti" were donated to the mantel clock. events. Broadcasting was done in a hurry equipped studio in the basement with the lights off. Later, in a building opposite were found maturation snipers. For coverage of

Showing important events, "Vesti" become the most influential program on RTR. In the same year, Yuri Rostov, Vladislav Flyarkovsky and Aleksandr Gurnov started their jobs as field reporters for the channel under then head of news programming Alexander Nekhoroshev.

Since 1994, the program began to leave a comment, "Details", which became a leading political commentator Nikolai Svanidze news. In October 1995, the RTR with ORT program went "Ivanov, Petrov, Sidorov."

In 1996 Oleg Poptsov, Anatoly Lysenko, Alexander and Alexander Podgorbunsky Nekhoroshev were relieved of their posts, and Details was pulled off. The new chairman of the All-Russia State Television and Radio Company Eduard Sagalaev was appointed, and Cyril Legat chosen as the new GM for television, editor in chief of information programs of Russian Television Boris Forgetful. The channel will have emerged a number of new programs - information-analytical program "Mirror", which became a leading Nikolai Svanidze, the actual interview "VIP", talk show "Open News", which became the leading Edward Sagalaev, Svetlana Sorokina and Oksana Naychuk a manufacturer of private television ATV.

In 1997, the chairman of the All-Russia State Television and Radio Company was Nikolai Svanidze. Programs "VIP" and "Open News" were closed, she was dismissed leading "Vesti" Svetlana Sorokina. On November of that year, "RTR" changed to "RTR-1" has changed the logo. The reason for the name change - the creation of a new TV channel "RTR-2" (now "Russia-Culture").

On 8 May 1998, in the RTR includes regional television and radio. Since then, "RTR" broadcasts in 54 languages of the peoples of Russia, RTR became the largest media group in Europe. The general is not only the design of the channel, but the editorial policy. On 7 September of that year, on the air for the first time block out the morning program Good Morning, Russia!.

On 14 September 1998, "RTR-1" again changed its name to "RTR", changed the logo. At that time there were many Latin American television series production and a lot of new TV shows: Two piano Household chores, Schedule, Purple haze, and Hakuna matata. The show Hundred to One also joined the channel, thus leaving TVC-Moskva. Similarly, programs Musical Ring, 50x50, talk show My Family, and Love from the First Sight, that were previously aired on ORT moved to RTR as well.

In 1999, the channel disbanded the sports program "Arena" and instead was established the program "Studio", headed by Vladimir Gomelsky. The daily "Vesti" began to be broadcast at 13:00, 17:00, 19:00, 21:00, 23:00.

Up to 1999, the national channel was plagued by broadcasting problems resulting from its dependence on its local state affiliates (GTRKs) for retransmission of its signal. GTRKs had no incentive to consistently broadcast only federal programming on their local frequencies and would often mix in programming they had produced themselves or acquired from other sources, thus hampering the national channel’s ability to control its own programming schedule at the regional level. The first step leading to the solution of this problem was the creation of the state holding company VGTRK, which united 89 state-owned regional studios under the aegis of the Moscow-based Channel 2. In February 2004, the Russian government issued a resolution on the reorganization of VGTRK through affiliation of subsidiaries, including regional GTRK companies. By the end of 2004, the scale of the reorganization became obvious. Local news programmes were organized on network principles and local companies turned into "re-transmitters" of the Moscow-produced content: VGTRK management had decided to cut all types of broadcasting in the regions, except news. This decision caused an inevitable reduction of GTRK broadcasting volume from 900 - 1,200 to 590 hours, the closure of whole subdivisions and departments and the dismissal of hundreds of employees in each of the 89 companies.

On 31 December 2018, a separate feed of the Russia-1 schedule was launched for each of the eleven time zones of Russia. Dating back to a practice begun after the launch of Orbita in 1967, there had previously been only five feeds of Russia-1 and its predecessor (Programme Two) for the entire country—one operating on Moscow Time and variations time-shifted ahead by two, four, six, and eight hours. Viewers in the "odd" time zones relative to Moscow Time would receive a feed from the nearest "even" time zone, causing programming to air either one hour earlier or one hour later than schedules indicated.

== Viewership ==
According to Mediascope, by 2020, Russia-1 was the most popular TV channel in Russia with an average daily audience of 1,338,000, exceeding the audience of its closest rival Channel One Russia by almost 9%.

== Criticism ==
=== Censorship, bias and false messages in information programs ===
- Some journalists criticized the Vesti program releases from early September 2004 about the Beslan tragedy for manipulating socially significant information. In particular, in one of her direct inclusions, the then correspondent of the program Margarita Simonyan mentioned the figure of "354 hostages", although the true number was initially known and amounted to 1128 people, as well as the fact that "the terrorists do not make demands" (despite the fact that in fact the main requirement was also announced in advance It was the withdrawal of Russian troops from Chechnya).
- In April 2007, it was reported that the TV channel had censored a French documentary about the preparation of the latest sensational color revolutions called «Revolution.com. USA: the Conquest of the East», released in September 2005. According to the Kommersant newspaper and the French side, as a result of the editing, the content of the film was greatly changed: all undesirable moments and comments, mentions of opposition organizations, episodes filmed in the Russian capital, as well as the name of one of the authors, Manon Loiseau, were removed from it. According to Kommersant's calculations, in the remounted version shown on Rossiya on April 15, 2007, the film ran for 48 minutes from 20:46 to 21:34 (which caused the timing of the Vesti Nedelya program running before the film to be shortened from 1 hour to 45 minutes), while As in the original, the film ran for 53 minutes and 40 seconds. Representatives of the Russian TV channel said that the film was cut by prior agreement with the French side, and the credits were the same as they were provided by the French. The representative of the French agency SARAH, in turn, noted that the Rossiya TV channel violated the terms of a strict contract, according to which no changes should have been made to this film.
- In March 2011, Archpriest Vyacheslav (Pushkarev), head of the missionary department of the Irkutsk Diocese of the Russian Orthodox Church, assessed the TV channel's position in covering the conflict in Libya.:

«…Two months ago, Gaddafi was a reliable partner of Russia, now he has become a "dictator" and a "murderer of his own people." What a metamorphosis! With all this, a one-sided approach to highlighting the problem is obvious. Our TV channels have chosen a line of imitation of Western media ... It turns out that our journalists and editors are supporters of rebellions and coups d'etat and they don't care about the constitutional order?.. Our central media went along with politics and, violating the basic norms of journalistic ethics, showed the whole world and us the highest level of their own unprofessionalism and engagement. After all, they shamelessly began to use the methodology of double standards in their "work"... Will our media find, and especially the channel "Russia" and "Channel One (Russia)|Channel One]]", do you have the strength and determination to admit dishonesty and apologize to the Libyan people and their leader? I doubt».

- In June 2013, the Ministry of Foreign Affairs of Turkmenistan accused the Rossiya-1 TV channel and special correspondent Yevgeny Poddubny of unprofessionalism for the report "Syrian Jihad turns opposition into radicals," which showed footage allegedly featuring a citizen of Turkmenistan, a certain Rovshan Gazakov, a militant commander of the bombers. The statement of the Ministry of Foreign Affairs of Turkmenistan notes:

«…that such reports based on unreliable information do not correspond to the spirit of positively developing Turkmen-Russian relations, are a violation of basic norms of journalistic ethics and are considered by the Turkmen side as attempts to misinform the audience.».

In the report itself, the captured members of the terrorist group claim that they came from Turkmenistan. According to a number of online media, even before the Rossiya-1 TV channel aired the story "Syrian Jihad turns the opposition into radicals," Turkmenistan's special services had information about terrorists detained in Syria, in addition, employees of the Turkmen law enforcement agencies were actively searching for accomplices of members of the al-Nusra Front group in Turkmenistan.

- June 28, 2013 German public TV channel ZDF denied the accusations of the Rossiya channel in paying for support Pussy Riot on German state television. ZDF had to respond on air in pure Russian to avoid translation difficulties.
- The Special Correspondent program, which aired on November 28, 2014, used a video depicting naked men to demonstrate the "immorality" of Western values in the field of parenting. At the same time, the question sounded in the frame of the Russian broadcast: "Should a children's room look like this?". On December 2, 2014, it became known that Fathead (USA) announced its intention to sue the Rossiya-1 TV channel, since in fact the original of this video used the image of a monster truck.

On 23 May 2015, Russia-1 aired Warsaw Pact: Declassified Pages, a documentary that presented the 1968 invasion of Czechoslovakia as protection against a NATO coup. Slovakia's Ministry of Foreign Affairs stated that the film "attempts to rewrite history and to falsify historical truths about such a dark chapter of our history." Czech Foreign Minister Lubomír Zaorálek said that it "grossly distorts" the facts.

The channel, like many other state-owned television channels, has been criticized for strong pro-government bias and propaganda. In 2017, Dmitry Skorobutov, a long-term editor at the channel, published a periodically-updated guide for journalists that contains a list of topics, the coverage of which is forbidden. It included topics such as anti-government protests, the downing of MH17 over Donbas, Nadia Savchenko, Crimean Tatars, and even Queen Elizabeth II's anniversary.

In June 2017, researchers of Atlantic Council published a detailed analysis of one fake story propagated by Russia-1, about a Russian warplane deploying an electronic warfare system so powerful that it was able to completely disable defence systems of US Navy destroyer. The original story was traced to a satirical piece written by a Russian author Dmitry Sedov, in a form of a panicked letter from American navy sailor to his wife. The story was then picked up by Russia-1 as a description of a real incident and aired with a made-up video demonstrating the advantages of Russian weapons. In spite of the Russian weapon manufacturer denying the report and calling it "a fake", Russian media continued to repeated the story, adding further invented details such as fake statement from a former United States Air Force commander in Europe.

On 8 May 2022, the Office of Foreign Assets Control of the United States Department of the Treasury placed sanctions on Russia-1 pursuant to Executive Order 14024 for being owned or controlled by, or for having acted or purported to act for or on behalf of, directly or indirectly, the Government of Russia. The channel's news programming has been noted for the frequency with which its presenters propose Russian nuclear attacks on Western countries, including the United Kingdom and United States.

== Awards ==
- The channel's projects and its staff have repeatedly received TEFI awards..
- Certificate of Honor from the IPA CIS Council (November 26, 2015, CIS Interparliamentary Assembly) — for active participation in the international TV forum "Together", contribution to strengthening friendship between the peoples of the member states of the Commonwealth of Independent States.

== Logo history ==
September (?) to December 1991

January 1992 to October 1993

November 1993 to September 1998

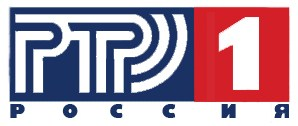
November 1997 to September 1998 (not used on air)

September 1998 to September 2001

September 2001 to August 2002

September 2002 to December 2008

December 2008 to December 2009

January 2010 to March 2012

March to September 2012

Since October 2012

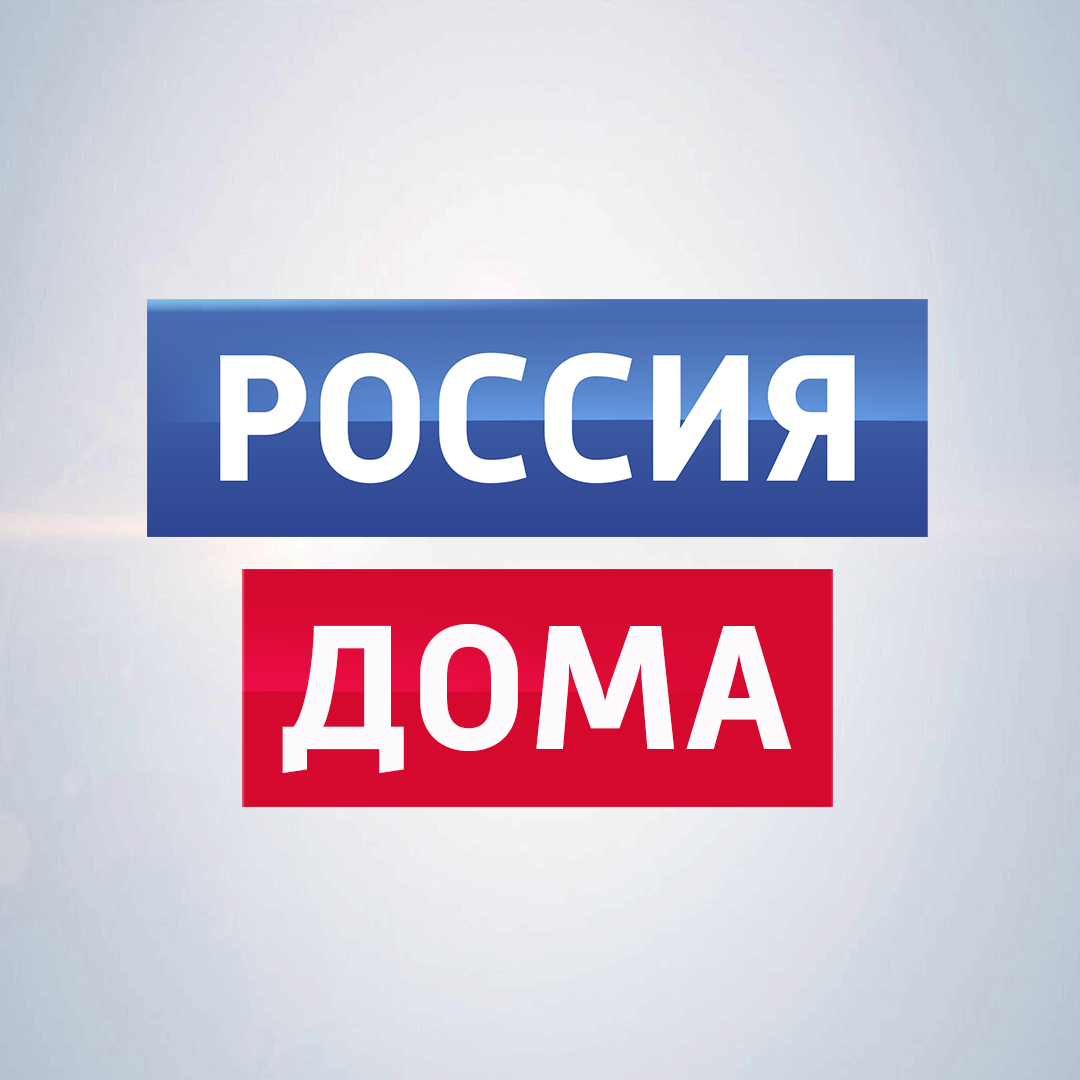
The channel logo during the COVID-19 pandemic
