= Ouellette =

Ouellette is a name of French origin common among French Canadians. It also exists in such forms as Ouellet.

== People with the surname ==
- Bella Ouellette (1886–1945), Canadian actress
- Caroline Ouellette, Canadian ice hockey player
- Fernand Ouellette (1930–2026), Canadian Quebecois poet, writer and essayist
- Guy Ouellette, Canadian police officer and politician
- Jennifer Ouellette, Author, skeptic
- Jennifer Ouellette, New York-based milliner
- Jerry Ouellette, Ontario politician
- Joseph R. Ouellette, United States Army soldier and Medal of Honor recipient
- Madeleine Ouellette-Michalska, Canadian writer
- Pierre Ouellette, American science-fiction author
- Rodney Ouellette, Canadian politician, physician and scientist
- Robert Falcon Ouellette, Federal MP, Indigenous leader, professor
- Rose Ouellette, Canadian actress
- Steven Ouellette, American politician

== Places ==
- Ouellette, Ontario, Canada
- Observation Post Ouellette, Joint Security Area, Korean Demilitarized Zone

== See also ==
- Ouellet
