= My Kitchen Rules series 2 =

My Kitchen Rules
- Series 2
- No. of episodes: 33

Release
- Original network: Seven Network
- Original release: 31 January – 13 April 2011

Series chronology
- ← Previous; Series 1 (2010) Next → Series 3 (2012)

The second season of the Australian competitive cooking competition show My Kitchen Rules premiered on the Seven Network on 31 January 2011.

== Teams ==
State		Group	Members	Relationship	Status
New South Wales	NSW	1	Sammy & Bella Jakubiak	Sisters	Winners 13 April (Grand Final)
Victoria	VIC	1	Kane Lillywhite & Lee Chan	Housemates	Runners-up 13 April (Grand Final)
South Australia	SA	2	Anne-Marie Battista & Nick Sharp	Newlyweds	Eliminated 12 April (Semi-Finals)
Western Australia	WA	1	Daniela Pirone & Stefania Muscara	Cousins	Eliminated 11 April (Semi-Finals)
New South Wales	NSW	2	Bill Ringland & Alex McCann	School Mates	Eliminated 6 April (Top 5)
Tasmania	TAS	2	Esther Rupenovic & Ali Elphinstone	Cops	Eliminated 4 April (Top 6)
Victoria	VIC	2	Kelly & Ash Cooke	High Achievers	Withdrew 30 March (Top 7)
Tasmania	TAS	1	Melanie & James Maddock	Recently Married	Eliminated 23 March (Top 8)
Queensland	QLD	1	Artie Vella & Johnnie Brown	Butchers	Eliminated 16 March (Top 9)
Queensland	QLD	2	Mal Gill & Bec Saul	Urban Hippies	Eliminated 9 March (Top 10)
South Australia	SA	1	Donna & Reade Chandler	Used Car Dealers	Eliminated 2 March (Top 11)
Western Australia	WA	2	Kerry & Holly Zilko	Mother and Daughter	Eliminated 23 February (Instant Restaurant Round)

== Elimination history ==
Teams' Competition Progress
Round:	Instant Restaurants			Top 11	Top 10	Top 9	Top 8	Top 7	Top 6	Top 5	Semi-Finals		Grand Final
Round:	1	2	SD	Top 11	Top 10	Top 9	Top 8	Top 7	Top 6	Top 5	1	2	Grand Final
Teams:	Progress												
Sammy & Bella	**1st** (89)	—N/a	→	**Immune**	**HQ** (Safe)	**HQ** (Safe)	**HQ** (Safe)	**HQ** (Safe)	**HQ** (Safe)	**HQ** (Safe)	**1st** (53)	—N/a	**Champions** (56)
Kane & Lee	**6th** (59)	—N/a	**SD** (16)	**HQ** (Safe)	**HQ** (Safe)	**HQ** (Safe)	**SD** (48)	**SD** (Saved)	**HQ** (Safe)	**HQ** (Safe)	—N/a	**1st** (46)	**Runners-up** (52)
Anne-Marie & Nick	—N/a	**5th** (65)	→	**HQ** (Safe)	**HQ** (Safe)	**HQ** (Safe)	**HQ** (Safe)	**HQ** (Safe)	**HQ** (Safe)	**SD** (38)	—N/a	**2nd** (40)	**Eliminated** (Episode 32)
Daniela & Stefania	**2nd** (83)	—N/a	→	**HQ** (Safe)	**HQ** (Safe)	**People's**; **Choice**	**HQ** (Safe)	**People's**; **Choice**	**SD** (Safe)	**HQ** (Safe)	**2nd** (50)	**Eliminated** (Episode 31)	
Bill & Alex	—N/a	**1st** (86)	→	**Immune**	**SD** (34)	**SD** (41)	**People's**; **Choice**	**People's**; **Choice**	**HQ** (Safe)	**SD** (24)	**Eliminated** (Episode 30)		
Esther & Ali	—N/a	**2nd** (72)	→	**HQ** (Safe)	**HQ** (Safe)	**HQ** (Safe)	**HQ** (Safe)	**HQ** (Safe)	**SD** (Lose)	**Eliminated** (Episode 28)			
Kelly & Ash	—N/a	**4th** (70)	→	**HQ** (Safe)	**HQ** (Safe)	**HQ** (Safe)	**HQ** (Safe)	**SD → Quit**	**Withdrew** (Episode 26)				
Melanie & James	**4th** (75)	—N/a	→	**HQ** (Safe)	**People's**; **Choice**	**HQ** (Safe)	**SD** (35)	**Eliminated** (Episode 24)					
Artie & Johnnie	**3rd** (76)	—N/a	→	**SD** (41)	**HQ** (Safe)	**SD** (38)	**Eliminated** (Episode 21)						
Mal & Bec	—N/a	**3rd** (71)	→	**People's**; **Choice**	**SD** (33)	**Eliminated** (Episode 18)							
Donna & Reade	**5th** (73)	—N/a	→	**SD** (34)	**Eliminated** (Episode 15)								
Kerry & Holly	—N/a	**6th** (55)	**SD** (14)	**Eliminated** (Episode 12)									

Cell Descriptions
	Team won a challenge, People's Choice, cooked the best dish or received the highest score for the round.
	Team lost a challenge, cooked the weakest dish or received a low score and must compete in an additional round or challenge.
Safe	Team was safe from elimination after passing a challenge. (If applicable, team was safe after the challenge listed in bold); **PC** = People's Choice, **HQ** = Kitchen Headquarters challenge, **SD** = Sudden Death
→	Team advanced to next round.
**SD**	Team competed in a Sudden Death Cook-Off and became safe from elimination.
**SD**	Team was eliminated after losing in a Sudden Death Cook-Off or round.
**SD → Quit**	Team quit the competition.
**Immune**	From winning the previous challenge, the team was immune from elimination and was not required to participate.
—N/a	Results do not apply as the team was not allocated to this challenge or round.

== Competition details ==
=== Instant Restaurants ===
During the Instant Restaurant rounds, each team hosts a three-course dinner for judges and fellow teams in their allocated group. They are scored and ranked among their group, with the lowest scoring team from each group competing in a Sudden Death Cook-Off, where one team is eliminated.

==== Round 1 ====
- Episodes 1 to 6
- Airdate — 31 January to 9 February
- Description — The first of the two instant restaurant groups are introduced into the competition in Round 1. At the end of the round, the lowest scoring team goes to Sudden Death, with a risk of being eliminated.

Instant Restaurant Summary
Group 1
Team and Episode Details		Guest Scores						Pete's Scores			Manu's Scores			Total (out of 110)	Rank	Result
Team and Episode Details		A&J	K&L	S&B	D&R	M&J	D&S	Entrée	Main	Dessert	Entrée	Main	Dessert	Total (out of 110)	Rank	Result
QLD	Artie & Johnnie	—	7	7	7	7	7	5	8	8	5	8	7	76	3rd	Safe
Ep 1	31 January	The Beach Shack														Safe
Dishes	Entrée	Chicken & Bug Meat Roulade with Frangelico & Chive Sauce														Safe
Dishes	Main	Twice Cooked Pork Belly with Scallops, Cauliflower, Cabbage & Carrots														Safe
Dishes	Dessert	Poached Pears in Chocolate & Almond Cake														Safe
VIC	Kane & Lee	6	—	5	6	5	6	3	6	7	4	6	5	59	6th	Through to Sudden Death
Ep 2	1 February	Masquerade														Through to Sudden Death
Dishes	Entrée	Duck Spring Rolls with Zucchini & Broad Bean Salad & Hoisin Sauce														Through to Sudden Death
Dishes	Main	Crispy Skin Salmon with Saffron Braised Fennel & Asaparagus														Through to Sudden Death
Dishes	Dessert	Sweet Red Bean Soup with Pandan Ice Cream & Almond Praline														Through to Sudden Death
NSW	Sammy & Bella	7	7	—	8	7	8	10	9	8	10	8	7	89	1st	Safe
Ep 3	2 February	Olka Polka!														Safe
Dishes	Entrée	Prawn Bun with Sriracha and Mayo														Safe
Dishes	Main	Seafood Marinara														Safe
Dishes	Dessert	Butterscotch Pudding with Carmel Sauce and Ice Cream														Safe
SA	Donna & Reade	6	5	7	—	5	8	7	8	7	7	5	7	73	5th	Safe
Ep 4	7 February	Chandler's Grill														Safe
Dishes	Entrée	Stuffed Field Mushrooms with Chorizo & Buffalo Mozzarella														Safe
Dishes	Main	Prosciutto Wrapped Tuna on Peperonata & Aioli														Safe
Dishes	Dessert	Coconut Ice Cream with Mango Salsa & Chocolate Barrell														Safe
TAS	Melanie & James	7	5	8	7	—	8	8	4	8	8	5	7	75	4th	Safe
Ep 5	8 February	Hot Plate														Safe
Dishes	Entrée	Crispy Fried Prawns with Egg Noodles & Vietnamese Salad														Safe
Dishes	Main	Eye Fillet with Blue Cheese Butter & Mushrooms														Safe
Dishes	Dessert	Choux Pastry filled with Chocolate Creme Patissiere with Rum Cream Anglaise														Safe
WA	Daniela & Stefania	7	8	8	9	7	—	6	8	8	6	8	8	83	2nd	Safe
Ep 6	9 February	Saporito														Safe
Dishes	Entrée	Gnocchi a Tagamino with Gruyere Cheese														Safe
Dishes	Main	Marinated Baby Goat with Roast Potatoes & Cabbage														Safe
Dishes	Dessert	Chocolate Pavlovas with Berries & Chocolate Syrup														Safe

==== Round 2 ====
- Episodes 7 to 12
- Airdate – 14 February to 23 February
- Description – The second group now start their Instant Restaurant round. The same rules from the previous round apply and the lowest scoring team goes to Sudden Death, with a chance of being eliminated.

Instant Restaurant Summary
Group 2
Team and Episode Details		Guest Scores						Pete's Scores			Manu's Scores			Total (out of 110)	Rank	Result
Team and Episode Details		M&B	K&A	E&A	B&A	A&N	K&H	Entrée	Main	Dessert	Entrée	Main	Dessert	Total (out of 110)	Rank	Result
QLD	Mal & Bec	—	6	6	7	7	6	8	7	6	7	6	5	71	3rd	Safe
Ep 7	14 February	Marmalade Bistro														Safe
Dishes	Entrée	Stuffed Courgette Flower with Pumpkin Puree & Edible Flowers														Safe
Dishes	Main	Tea Smoked Duck with Brussels Sprouts & Duck Fat Potato Stack														Safe
Dishes	Dessert	Berry Frangipane Tart with Elderflower and Honey Cream														Safe
VIC	Kelly & Ash	5	—	6	7	7	6	5	4	9	7	6	8	70	4th	Safe
Ep 8	15 February	The Village Green														Safe
Dishes	Entrée	Gorgonzola Panna Cotta with Roast Tomatoes, Crispy Speck & Balsamic Reduction														Safe
Dishes	Main	Feta Stuffed Lamb Cutlets with Porcini & White Bean Ragout & Mini Yorkshire Puddings														Safe
Dishes	Dessert	Salted Peanut Brittle Parfait with Brulee Banana & Butterscotch Sauce														Safe
TAS	Esther & Ali	5	6	—	6	7	7	6	6	8	5	7	9	72	2nd	Safe
Ep 9	16 February	Estali														Safe
Dishes	Entrée	Seared Scallops with Cheddar Arancini														Safe
Dishes	Main	Pork Saltimbocca with Polenta & White Wine Jus														Safe
Dishes	Dessert	Raspberry Mirior with Raspberry Coulis & Cream														Safe
NSW	Bill & Alex	8	7	8	—	8	8	8	8	8	7	8	8	86	1st	Safe
Ep 10	21 February	Una Mas...														Safe
Dishes	Entrée	Drunken Pears with Goats Cheese Cream														Safe
Dishes	Main	Roast Pheasant with Crispy Sage, Witlof, Orange and Juniper Berries														Safe
Dishes	Dessert	Baked Blueberry Cheesecake with Strawberries														Safe
SA	Anne-Marie & Nick	6	5	7	7	—	5	5	8	5	6	8	3	65	5th	Safe
Ep 11	22 February	Elements														Safe
Dishes	Entrée	"Taste of the Sea" Stuffed Prawn, Scallop with Parsnip Puree, Calamari & Oyster														Safe
Dishes	Main	Surf & Turf Gumbo with Spicy Sausage, Prawns & Blue Swimmer Crab														Safe
Dishes	Dessert	Chocolate Risotto Balls with Ice Cream Centres														Safe
WA	Kerry & Holly	5	4	6	6	5	—	4	4	6	4	4	7	55	6th	Through to Sudden Death
Ep 12	23 February	Cardamom														Through to Sudden Death
Dishes	Entrée	Lamb and Fennel Crépes with Relish and Pesto														Through to Sudden Death
Dishes	Main	Pan Fried Snapper with Smoked Trout Sausage														Through to Sudden Death
Dishes	Dessert	Créme Caramel with Raspberry Sorbet														Through to Sudden Death

==== Sudden Death Cook-off ====
- Episode 12
- Airdate – 23 February
- Description – The two lowest scoring teams from each Instant Restaurant round will now compete in a cook-off, with the lowest-scoring team being eliminated.

Sudden Death Cook-off Results
Instant Restaurant Sudden Death Cook-Off
Team		Scores		Total (out of 20)	Result
Team		Pete	Manu	Total (out of 20)	Result
VIC	Kane & Lee	8	8	16	Safe
Signature Dish		Thai Chicken Curry with Coconut Rice and Sweet Potato Chips			Safe
WA	Kerry & Holly	7	7	14	Eliminated
Signature Dish		Duo of Pork: Pork Fillet Stuffed with Apricot and Prunes - Pork Belly & Crackling, Bean & Peas Purée and Caramelised Pear			Eliminated

=== Top 11 ===
==== People's Choice Challenge: Street Party ====
- Episode 13
- Airdate - 28 February 2011
- Description - This is the first People's Choice Challenge. While Sammy & Bella, Bill & Alex are immuned for being on top of the leader board in the Instant Restaurant Challenge, the 9 teams left have to cook for an annual street party. Each team has to cook in the resident house and can choose to cook either sweet or savoury dishes. The team with the most votes from the residents who enjoy the party will be People's Choice and get immuned from the Kitchen HQ. The team with the weakest dish decides by Pete & Manu will join the Sudden Death Cook-off.

Teams		Dishes		Result
NSW	Sammy & Bella	Immune		
NSW	Bill & Alex	Immune		
QLD	Mal & Bec	Savoury	Bush Spiced Lamb with Trail Couscous Salad	Peoples' Choice
SA	Anne-Marie & Nick	Savoury	Crusted Chicken with Roasted Summer Salad	Competing in the Kitchen HQ
TAS	Melanie & James	Sweet	Lemon Tart with Pistachio Nut Toffee	Competing in the Kitchen HQ
TAS	Esther & Ali	Sweet	Chocolate & Raspberry Brownies with Raspberry Frosting	Competing in the Kitchen HQ
VIC	Kane & Lee	Savoury	Turkey San Choy Bow with Crispy Fried Wonton Skin	Competing in the Kitchen HQ
VIC	Kelly & Ash	Sweet	Rhubarb & Roasted Strawberry Cheesecake	Competing in the Kitchen HQ
WA	Daniela & Stefania	Sweet	Meringue Trifle with Passionfruit Syrup	Competing in the Kitchen HQ
SA	Donna & Reade	Savoury	BBQ King Prawn with Fennel Risotto	Competing in the Kitchen HQ
QLD	Artie & Johnnie	Savoury	Lamp Swag Surprise with Avocado, Basil and Asparagus Salad	Through to Sudden Death

==== Kitchen Cook off ====
- Episode 14
- Airdate - 1 March 2011
- Description - After the People's Choice, beside Bill & Alex, Sammy & Bella and Mal & Bec. The rest teams has to join the Kitchen Headquarter. Each team has to cook a dish with meat and 3 types of vegetable. However, the rule changes and all the ingredients must be in a pie and have to make it in 1 hour left. The team with the weakest dish chosen by Pete and Manu will join the Sudden Death Cook-off with Artie & Johnie.

Teams		Dishes	Result
SA	Anne-Marie & Nick	Beef & Port Pie with Leek & Bean Crust and Garden Veggies	Safe
TAS	Melane & James	Lamb Cutlet Shepherd's Pie with Roast Beetroot, Tomatoes and Potatoes	Safe
TAS	Esther & Ali	Chicken & Mushroom Pie with Bean, Cabbage and Prosciutto Salad	Safe
VIC	Kane & Lee	Spanish Chicken Open Pie with Potato Chips	Safe
VIC	Kelly & Ash	Pork & Apple Pie with Parsnip Purée and Fennel Salad	Safe
WA	Daniela & Stefania	Beef & Veg Calzone with Capsicum and Eggplant Peperonata	Safe
SA	Donna & Reade	Lamb Pie Floater with Red Cabbage, Pear and Walnut Salad	Through to Sudden Death

==== Sudden Death ====
- Episode 15
- Airdate – 2 March 2011
- Description – Artie & Johnnie compete against Donna & Reade. Each team has to cook a 3-course meal for the judges. The team with the lower score from the judges will be eliminated from the competition.

Sudden Death Cook-Off Results
Sudden Death Cook-Off 1
Team		Judge's Scores						Total (out of 60)	Result
Team		Karen	Tobie	Liz	Guy	Pete	Manu	Total (out of 60)	Result
QLD	Artie & Johnnie	7	6	7	7	7	7	41	Safe
Dishes	Entrée	Twisted Prawn Cocktail with Paw Paw and Avocado Salad							Safe
Dishes	Main	Thai-Style Duck Breast with a Trio of Oriental Mushrooms							Safe
Dishes	Dessert	Sticky Fig Pudding with Chocolate Butterscotch Sauce and Vanilla Bean Ice Cream							Safe
SA	Donna & Reade	5	5	6	6	6	6	34	Eliminated
Dishes	Entrée	Char Grilled Quail with Polenta and Grape Salad							Eliminated
Dishes	Main	Pan Fried Snapper with Cannellini Beans and Zucchini Flowers							Eliminated
Dishes	Dessert	Espresso Panna Cotta with Almond Bread							Eliminated

=== Top 10 ===
==== People's Choice Challenge: Channel 7 Studios Breakfast ====
- Episode 16
- Airdate - 7 March 2011
- Description - Top 10 has to cook breakfast for all the employees and celebrities who are working in Channel 7 Studio. The team with the most votes from everyone who enjoy the breakfast will be People's Choice and get immuned from the Kitchen HQ. The team with the weakest dish decides by Pete & Manu will join the Sudden Death Cook-off.

Teams		Dishes	Result
TAS	Melanie & James	Blueberry Hotcake with Berry and Mango Compote and Honeyed Pecan Cream	Peoples' Choice
QLD	Artie & Johnnie	Sausage Brekkie Wrap with Maltese Sausage and Scrambled Eggs	Competing in the Kitchen HQ
TAS	Esther & Ali	Vietnamese Pho: Vietnamese Breakfast Soup with Beef and Rice Noodles	Competing in the Kitchen HQ
VIC	Kelly & Ash	Corn Fritters with Zucchini & Halloumi, Tomato Relish, Avocado Cream	Competing in the Kitchen HQ
NSW	Bill & Alex	Poached Eggs on Broad Bean Stack with Avocado Prosciutto and Breakfast Palmiers	Competing in the Kitchen HQ
SA	Anne-Marie & Nick	Breakfast Burrito: Prawn and Corn Omelette in a Tortilla	Competing in the Kitchen HQ
NSW	Sammy & Bella	English Breakfast with a Twist: Potato Cakes, Pea Sorbet, Homemade Bread, Poached Egg	Competing in the Kitchen HQ
WA	Daniela & Stefania	Brekkie Skewers with Fried Polenta, Italian Sausage, Frittata, Baked Tomatoes	Competing in the Kitchen HQ
VIC	Kane & Lee	Chinese Tasting Plate: Beef Congee, Crispy Pancakes, Quail Eggs, Pork Dumplings	Competing in the Kitchen HQ
QLD	Mal & Bec	Burger vs Brioche: Halloumi & Avocado Burger and Feta & Mushroom Brioche	Through to Sudden Death

==== Kitchen HQ: Lunch Challenge ====
- Episode 17
- Airdate - 8 March 2011
- Description - In the Kitchen Cook-off, teams have 30 minutes to impress the judges by cooking a Gourmet sandwich dish for lunch. However, only one person in the team can cook; and the other person has to sit aside, only able to offer verbal and tasting help. The 4 teams with the weaker dishes than the others will join in the 2nd round. In the Showdown, teams have to use the minimum of 3 ingredients in the sandwich to make a soup dish in 45 minutes. The team with the weakest dish in the second round will join the Sudden Death Cook-off with Mal & Bec.

Kitchen Cook-off
Teams		Cook	Dishes	Result
NSW	Sammy & Bella	Bella	Rare Roast Beef Sandwich with Horseradish Cream and Beetroot	Safe
VIC	Kane & Lee	Lee	Seared Tuna Sandwich with Wasabi Mayonnaise	Safe
SA	Anne-Marie & Nick	Nick	Tuna Tartare Sandwich with Aioli	Safe
TAS	Esther & Ali	Esther	Salmon Sandwich with Thai Salad and Nam Jim Dressing	Safe
QLD	Artie & Johnnie	Artie	Greek Lamb Sandwich with Chargrilled Vegetables	Through to showdown
VIC	Kelly & Ash	Kelly	Eye Fillet Sandwich with Salad Verde	Through to showdown
WA	Daniela & Stefania	Stefania	Chicken Focaccia Sandwich with Eggplant and Mushrooms	Through to showdown
NSW	Bill & Alex	Alex	Stuffed Chicken Breast Sandwich with Pine Nuts, Feta, Spinach and Sweet Potato Spread	Through to showdown
Kitchen Showdown
Teams		Dishes		Result
QLD	Artie & Johnnie	Tomato, Lamb and Vegetable Soup		Safe
VIC	Kelly & Ash	Mushroom, Beef and Barley Soup with Goat's Cheese Croutons		Safe
WA	Daniela & Stefania	Chinese Soup with Dumplings		Safe
NSW	Bill & Alex	Tomato Soup with Chicken & Pork Meatballs		Through to Sudden Death

==== Sudden Death ====
- Episode 18
- Airdate – 9 March 2011
- Description – Mal & Bec compete against Bill & Alex. Each team has to cook a 3-course meal for the judges. The team with the lower score from the judges will be eliminated from the competition.

Sudden Death Cook-Off Results
Sudden Death Cook-Off 2
Team		Judge's Scores						Total (out of 60)	Result
Team		Karen	Tobie	Liz	Guy	Pete	Manu	Total (out of 60)	Result
NSW	Bill & Alex	6	6	6	6	5	5	34	Safe
Dishes	Entrée	Lobster Soup with Truffle							Safe
Dishes	Main	Twice Cooked Duck with Citrus Sauce, Chat Potatoes and Sugar Snap Peas							Safe
Dishes	Dessert	Baked Custard and Citrus Salad with Pistachio Biscotti							Safe
QLD	Mal & Bec	5	6	5	6	5	6	33	Eliminated
Dishes	Entrée	Polenta, Beetroot, Orange and Goat's Cheese Salad							Eliminated
Dishes	Main	Roast Lamb Rack with Sweet Pepper Purée and Potato Croquette							Eliminated
Dishes	Dessert	Banana and Caramel Tart with Praline							Eliminated

=== Top 9 ===
==== People’s Choice Challenge: Children Festival ====
- Episode 19
- Airdate - 14 March 2011
- Description - Top 9 has to cook for hundred thousand people who attend the Sydney's Children Festival. All the food has to be suitable and delicious for both kids and adults. Teams have 1 hour to cook and 90 minutes to serve. The team with the most votes from the public will be People's Choice and get immuned from the Kitchen HQ. The team with the weakest dish decides by Pete & Manu will be straight into the Sudden Death Cook-off.

Teams		Dish	Result
WA	Daniela & Stefania	Zeppole - Italian Doughnut ^{1}	Peoples' Choice
TAS	Esther & Ali	Chocolate Cream Puffs	Competing in the Kitchen HQ
TAS	Melanie & James	Spaghetti with Meatballs	Competing in the Kitchen HQ
VIC	Kelly & Ash	Chicken Burrito Baskets with Guacamole and Sour Cream	Competing in the Kitchen HQ
NSW	Bill & Alex	Crispy Chicken Nuggets with Dipping Sauces	Competing in the Kitchen HQ
SA	Anne-Marie & Nick	Beef Sliders with Potato Crisps and Coleslaw	Competing in the Kitchen HQ
NSW	Sammy & Bella	Fresh Fish Fingers with Noodles	Competing in the Kitchen HQ
VIC	Kane & Lee	Lamb Koftas with Tzatziki, Tomato Relish, Hummus and Pita	Competing in the Kitchen HQ
QLD	Artie & Johnnie	Hawaiian Pizza with Chicken and Bacon	Through to Sudden Death

Note:

- ^1 – The dish included Chocolate Sauce before, but they decided not to use it because it kept burning.

==== Kitchen HQ ====
- Episode 20
- Airdate - 15 March 2011
- Description - In the Kitchen Cook-off, teams have 30 minutes to impress the judges by cooking a pasta dish from scratch. However, the person who cooked in the last Kitchen Cook-off has to sit out and not allowed to cook. The 4 teams with the weaker dishes than the others will join in the 2nd round. In the Showdown, teams have to make a dessert with the ingredients: egg and flour for 90 minutes. The team with the weakest dish in the second round will join the Sudden Death Cook-off with Artie & Johnny.

Kitchen Cook-off
Teams		Cook	Dishes	Result
TAS	Melanie & James	James	Fettuccine with Capers, Anchovies and Tomatoes	Safe
VIC	Kane & Lee	Kane	Pumpkin Agnolotti with Napoli Sauce	Safe
SA	Anne-Marie & Nick	Anne-Marie	Porcini Handkerchiefs with Roasted Hazelnuts	Safe
TAS	Esther & Ali	Ali	Pork Masala and Cream Fettuccine	Through to showdown
NSW	Sammy & Bella	Sammy	Crab Cappelletti with Burnt Butter Sauce	Through to showdown
VIC	Kelly & Ash	Ash	Spiced Eggplant Fettuccine with Saffron Sauce	Through to showdown
NSW	Bill & Alex	Bill	Fettuccine with Tomato & Prosciutto Sauce	Through to showdown
Kitchen Showdown
Teams		Dishes		Result
TAS	Esther & Ali	Black Forest Delight with Cherry Soup		Safe
NSW	Sammy & Bella	Triple Chocolate Dream: Chocolate Fudge Cake - Chocolate Mousse - Chocolate Ganache with Blood Orange Sauce		Safe
VIC	Kelly & Ash	Chocolate Torte with Mousse and Frangelico Jelly		Safe
NSW	Bill & Alex	Pear Mousse on Macadamia Crumbles with Chocolate Tuile and Poached Pear		Through to Sudden Death

==== Sudden Death ====
- Episode 21
- Airdate – 16 March 2011
- Description – Artie & Johnnie compete against Bill & Alex. Each team has to cook a 3-course meal for the judges. The team with the lower score from the judges will be eliminated from the competition.

Sudden Death Cook-Off 3
Team		Judge's Scores						Total (out of 60)	Result
Team		Karen	Tobie	Liz	Guy	Pete	Manu	Total (out of 60)	Result
NSW	Bill & Alex	7	6	7	7	7	7	41	Safe
Dishes	Entrée	Scallops and Blood Sausage with Broad Bean Purée and Pancetta							Safe
Dishes	Main	Rabbit (Two Ways) with Peas and Watercress Purée							Safe
Dishes	Dessert	Chocolate Orange Tart with Orange Mousse							Safe
QLD	Artie & Johnny	7	6	6	6	7	6	38	Eliminated
Dishes	Entrée	Kingfish and Tuna Carpaccio with Campari Dressing							Eliminated
Dishes	Main	Beef Cheeks with Sweet Potato Purée and Zucchini Ribbons							Eliminated
Dishes	Dessert	Apple and Pecan Rum Cake with Rum Cream Sauce							Eliminated

=== Top 8 ===
==== People’s Choice Challenge: Outdoor Picnic ====
- Episode 22
- Airdate - 21 March 2011
- Description - Top 8 has to cook for picnickers who attend the Sydney International Food Festival. Each team has to cook 20 picnic plates including 3 dishes that involves a salad dish and a dish that can be eaten cold. Teams have 90 minutes to cook in the Kitchen HQ. The team with the most votes from the public will be People's Choice and get immuned from the Kitchen HQ Challenge. The team with the weakest dish decides by Pete & Manu will be straight into the Sudden Death Cook-off.

Teams		Dish	Result
NSW	Bill & Alex	Herb Crusted Lamb; Couscous Stuffed Capsicum; Goat's Cheese Salad	Peoples' Choice
TAS	Esther & Ali	Lemon & Herb Chicken; Potato Salad; Side of Greens	Competing in the Kitchen HQ
VIC	Kelly & Ash	Stuffed Squid; Pea Crostini; Pomegranate Fennel Salad	Competing in the Kitchen HQ
WA	Daniela & Stefania	Polpettone (Lamb Meatballs); Damper; Pasta Salad	Competing in the Kitchen HQ
SA	Anne-Marie & Nick	Salmon Patties; Fried Rice; Thai Salad	Competing in the Kitchen HQ
NSW	Sammy & Bella	Leek & Capsicum Salad; Potato Tortilla; Mackerel Escabeche	Competing in the Kitchen HQ
VIC	Kane & Lee	Rice Paper Rolls; Asian Coleslaw; Chicken Wings	Competing in the Kitchen HQ
TAS	Melanie & James	Baked Honey Ham; Potato Salad; Savoury Muffins	Through to Sudden Death

==== Kitchen HQ ====
- Episode 23
- Airdate - 15 March 2011
- Description- In the Kitchen Cook-off, teams have to make a canapé in 30 minutes. However, teams are separate. The first person will cook in the first 15 minutes and the second one will cook in the last 15 minutes and two people are not allowed to see each other cooking. Only 2 teams are saved after this Cook-off and the four left have to cook in the Showdown. In the showdown, teams have an hour to make a dish that is composed of a classing flavour pairing. The team with the weakest dish will join the Sudden Death Cook-off against Melanie & James.

Kitchen Cook-off
Team		Dishes		Result
VIC	Kelly & Ash	Steak Tartare on Mini Toast		Safe
SA	Anne-Marie & Nick	Prawn Tail Bites with Mango & Avocado Salad		Safe
TAS	Esther & Ali	Potato and Gorgonzola Soup Shooter		Through to showdown
NSW	Sammy & Bella	Poached Tuna with Japanese Salad and Sesame Seed Dressing		Through to showdown
WA	Daniela & Stefania	Parmesan Baskets with Goat's Cheese, Salmon and Caviar		Through to showdown
VIC	Kane & Lee	Beef Tataki with Sushi Rice and Wasabi		Through to showdown
Kitchen Showdown
Teams		Pairings	Dishes	Result
TAS	Esther & Ali	Coconut and Lime	Coconut Pudding with Poached Pear and Lime Syrup	Safe
NSW	Sammy & Bella	Pork and Apple	Pork with Peas, Artichoke Purée and Apple Sauce	Safe
WA	Daniela & Stefania	Seafood and Lemon	Fettuccine with Seafood and Gremolata	Safe
VIC	Kane & Lee	Duck and Apple	Duck with Apple Purée, Red Cabbage and Baked Apple	Through to Sudden Death

==== Sudden Death ====
- Episode 24
- Airdate – 16 March 2011
- Description – Melanie & James compete against Kane & Lee. Each team has to cook a 3-course meal for the judges. The team with the lower score from the judges will be eliminated from the competition.

Sudden Death Cook-Off 1
Team		Judge's Scores						Total (out of 60)	Result
Team		Karen	Tobie	Liz	Guy	Pete	Manu	Total (out of 60)	Result
VIC	Kane & Lee	8	8	8	8	8	8	48	Safe
Dishes	Entrée	Korean Beef Tartare with Cucumber, Nashi Pear and Pine Nuts							Safe
Dishes	Main	Haianese Chicken with Rice and Chicken Broth							Safe
Dishes	Dessert	Sweet Black Rice Pudding with Kaffir Lime Leaf, Banana and Toasted Coconut							Safe
TAS	Melanie & James	6	6	5	6	6	6	35	Eliminated
Dishes	Entrée	Stuffed Quail with Mushroom, Spinach, Pine Nuts and Bacon							Eliminated
Dishes	Main	Fish Stew with Rouille							Eliminated
Dishes	Dessert	Chocolate Fondant with Créme de Menthe and Chocolate Ice Cream							Eliminated

=== Top 7: Outback North Territory Adventure ===
==== Round 1 ====
- Episode 25
- Airdate - 28 March 2011
- Description - This is the first round of the NT Adventure. In the first round, teams will have to cook a damper and make the sauce for the damper in 30 minutes . The team with the best dish will be immuned from the whole adventure. In the second round, teams have to cook for cattle farmers: 2 cook Entrée, 2 cook Main and 2 cook Dessert. The team with the most votes from the public will be People's Choice and don't have to cook in the next challenge. The team with the weakest dish decided by Pete & Manu will be straight into the Sudden Death Cook-off.

Round 1: Kitchen Cook-off: Damper Challenge
Teams		Dishes	Result
NSW	Bill & Alex	Bacon, Rosemary and Thyme Damper with Spicy Tomato Sauce and Egg	Safe
WA	Daniela & Stefania	Sundried Tomato Damper with Four Cheese Sauce	Through to next round
TAS	Esther & Ali	Golden Syrup Damper with Dates	Through to next round
SA	Anne-Marie & Nick	Damper with Strawberries & Cream	Through to next round
NSW	Sammy & Bella	Macadamia & White Chocolate Damper with Raspberry Coulis	Through to next round
VIC	Kane & Lee	Sweet Damper with Peaches and Gorgonzola Sauce	Through to next round
VIC	Kelly & Ash	Feta Stuffed Bacon and Apple Damper with Onion Jam	Through to next round
Round 2: People's Choice: Cattle Farmers
Teams		Dishes	Result
WA	Daniela & Stefania	Beef Involtini with Potato Dumplings and Chargrilled Vegetables	Peoples' Choice
VIC	Kane & Lee	Lamb Stew with Roasted Potato and Corn	Safe
TAS	Esther & Ali	Butterscotch Dumplings with Vanilla Bean Custard and Lady Finger Bananas	Safe
NSW	Sammy & Bella	Layered Crepe Cake with Chocolate Ganache and Caramel Bananas	Safe
SA	Anne-Marie & Nick	Lamb Cutlet with Rosemary Skewers and Rustic Beer Bread	Safe
VIC	Kelly & Ash	Marinated Spatchcock with Herb Dipping Sauce and Watermelon Salad	Through to Sudden Death

==== Round 2 ====
- Episode 26
- Airdate - 29 March 2011
- Description- 4 teams left have to cook lunch for passengers on the Ghan Train. Teams have to cook Main and Dessert and the teams that cooked Dessert in the previous round will cook Main. Each team has to cook their dishes in 90 minutes. The weakest team will be sent to Sudden Death by Pete and Manu.

Teams		Course	Dish	Result
TAS	Esther & Ali	Main	Beef Eye Fillet with Potato Gratin and Spinach	Safe
NSW	Sammy & Bella	Main	Moroccan Chicken with Root Vegetables and Fried Cauliflower	Safe
SA	Anne-Marie & Nick	Dessert	Fruit Millefeuille with Mango Coulis and Lime & Macadamia Sand	Safe
VIC	Kane & Lee	Dessert	Chocolate Pancakes with Strawberry Coulis, Brandy Snap and Cream	Through to Sudden Death

==== Round 3 ====
- Episode 27
- Airdate – 30 March 2011
- Description - This is the Sudden Death between Kelly & Ash and Kane & Lee. However, Kelly & Ash have to withdraw from the competition due to a medical issue. All teams have to cook instead. Teams are divided to cook a three-course meal. Two teams will cook one course and the dish has to include a Darwin products: Mud Crab (Entrée), Barramundi (Main) and Tropical Fruit (Dessert). After the Cook-off, the winner team will be safe from the nest elimination round.

Teams		Dishes	Result
NSW	Sammy & Bella	Pan Fried Barramundi with Crushed Potatoes, Mussels and Pea Sauce	Safe (Be safe from elimination)
WA	Daniela & Stefania	Chilli Mud Crab with Focaccia Bread	Safe
TAS	Esther & Ali	Passionfruit Syrup Cake with Tropical Fruit Ratatouille	Safe
SA	Anne-Marie & Nick	Macadamia Crusted Barramundi with Lentil and Vegetable Broth	Safe
NSW	Bill & Alex	Passionfruit Zabaglione with Puff Pastry Crisp and Passionfruit Coulis	Safe
VIC	Kane & Lee	Salt & Pepper Mud Crab with Chilli & Soy Dipping Sauce	Safe
VIC	Kelly & Ash	Withdraw from the competition due to medical issues	

=== Top 6 ===
- Episode 28
- Airdate - 4 April 2011

==== Urban Challenge: Chinese Banquet ====
- Description- Apart Sammy & Bella, who won the last challenge, teams have to cook Chinese dishes. The judges include Pete, Manu and the China Town Top Restauranteer. Teams have 60 minites to cook their food. However, their shopping time will effect their cooking time: the faster you arrive the restaurant, the sooner you cook. There will be no People's Choice in this challenge. Two teams with the weakest dishes will go to Sudden Death Cook-off

Teams		Dishes	Result
VIC	Kane & Lee	Steamed Oysters with XO Sauce & Vermicelli and Vegetables	Safe
NSW	Bill & Alex	Coral Trout with Black Bean Sauce, Lotus Root, Cucumber Salad	Safe
SA	Anne-Marie & Nick	Cantonese Lobster and Pork Stir Fry with Black Bean Sauce	Safe
WA	Daniela & Stefania	Prawns with Vegetables and Seafood Dumplings	Through to Sudden Death
TAS	Esther & Ali	Mu Shu Pork with Mandarin Pancakes and Salt & Pepper Tofu	Through to Sudden Death

==== Sudden Death ====
- Description- After the Urban Challenge, Daniela & Stefania compete against Esther & Ali in the Sudden Death. Teams have 90 minutes to cook their signature dish. The team with the weaker dish decided by Pete & Manu will be eliminated.

Sudden Death
Team		Result
WA	Daniela & Stefania	Safe
Signature dish	Braised Rabbit on Mashed Potato with Vegetables	Safe
TAS	Esther & Ali	Eliminated
Signature dish	Slow Cooked Chicken with Sauerkraut	Eliminated

=== Top 5 ===
==== Kitchen HQ ====
- Episode 29
- Airdate - 5 April 2011
- Description- In the first round, teams have to cook international prawn dish in 30 minutes. The team with the weakest dish will be straight through the Sudden Death. In the second round, teams have to cook dishes that represent the cultural chosen in the first round in 60 minutes. Team with the weakest dish will compete against Anne-Marie and Nick in the Sudden Death while the others were in the Semi-finals.

Kitchen Cook-off
Teams		Dishes	Result
NSW	Sammy & Bella	Spanish Stuffed Tomatoes with Romesco Sauce and Prawns	Through to Showdown
VIC	Kane & Lee	Moroccan Prawns with Chermoula and Couscous	Through to Showdown
NSW	Bill & Alex	Vietnamese Hot and Sour Prawn & Fish Soup	Through to Showdown
WA	Daniela & Stefania	Indian Prawn & Cashew Nut Curry with Cucumber Raita and Rice	Through to Showdown
SA	Anne-Marie & Nick	Thai Riesling Poached Prawns with Apple Salad and Shallot Dressing	Through to Sudden Death
Kitchen Showdown
Teams		Dishes	Result
VIC	Kane & Lee	Moroccan Coffee & Dates with Sesame and Cinnamon Cookies	Safe (Through to Semi-Finals)
NSW	Sammy & Bella	Spanish Layered Cinnamon Pastry with Sherry Figs and Custard	Safe (Through to Semi-Finals)
WA	Daniela & Stefania	Indian Rice Pudding with Orange Syrup and Cardamom Puffs	Safe (Through to Semi-Finals)
NSW	Bill & Alex	Vietnamese Stuffed Squid and Crispy Prawns with Mango and Cucumber Salad	Through to Sudden Death

==== Sudden Death ====
- Episode 30
- Airdate – 6 April 2011
- Description – Anne-Marie & Nick compete against Bill & Alex. Each team has to cook a 3-course meal for the judges. The team will the higher score will be in the Semifinals. The team with the lower score from the judges will be eliminated from the competition.

Sudden Death Cook-Off 5
Team		Judge's Scores						Total (out of 60)	Result
Team		Karen	Tobie	Liz	Guy	Pete	Manu	Total (out of 60)	Result
SA	Anne-Marie & Nick	6	7	6	7	6	6	38	Safe (Through to Semi-Finals)
Dishes	Entrée	Seared Tuna with Paprika Mayonnaise and Pancetta							Safe (Through to Semi-Finals)
Dishes	Main	Champagne Risotto with Scallops and Bugs							Safe (Through to Semi-Finals)
Dishes	Dessert	Gin & Lime Meringue Tart							Safe (Through to Semi-Finals)
NSW	Bill & Alex	4	4	4	4	4	4	24	Eliminated
Dishes	Entrée	Beetroot Tart with Horseradish Cream							Eliminated
Dishes	Main	Pork Shoulder in Apple Cider with Celeriac Mash							Eliminated
Dishes	Dessert	Passionfruit Soufflé with Banana and Mango							Eliminated

=== Semi-finals ===
==== Semi-final 1 ====
- Episode 31
- Airdate – 11 April 2011
- Description – Sammy & Bella compete against Daniela & Stefania in the first Semifinal. Each team has to cook a 3-course meal for the judges. The team will the higher score will have their spot in the Grand Final with the opportunity to win $250,000.

Semi Final 1
Team		Judge's Scores						Total (out of 60)	Result
Team		Karen	Tobie	Liz	Guy	Pete	Manu	Total (out of 60)	Result
NSW	Sammy & Bella	9	9	8	9	9	9	53	Through to Grand Finale
Dishes	Entrée	Szechuan Style Soup with Pork, Prawns and Wood Ear Mushrooms							Through to Grand Finale
Dishes	Main	Smoked Duck Breast with Duck Sausage and Spicy Eggplant							Through to Grand Finale
Dishes	Dessert	Spiced Crème Caramel with Ginger Wafer and Caramelised Pineapple							Through to Grand Finale
WA	Daniela & Stefania	8	9	8	9	8	8	50	Eliminated
Dishes	Entrée	Potato & Ricotta Ravioloni in a Butter & Mint Sauce							Eliminated
Dishes	Main	Osso Bucco with Polenta							Eliminated
Dishes	Dessert	Zuccotto filled with Ricotta, Chocolate and Mascarpone							Eliminated

==== Semi-final 2 ====
- Episode 32
- Airdate – 12 April 2011
- Description – Kane & Lee compete against Anne-Marie & Nick in the second Semifinal. Each team has to cook a 3-course meal for the judges. The team will the higher score will have their spot in the Grand Final against Sammy & Bella with the opportunity to win $250,000.

Semi Final 2
Team		Judge's Scores						Total (out of 60)	Result
Team		Karen	Tobie	Liz	Guy	Pete	Manu	Total (out of 60)	Result
VIC	Kane & Lee	8	8	8	8	7	7	46	Through to Grand Finale
Dishes	Entrée	Crab Larb with Cabbage and Deep Fried Soft Shell Crab							Through to Grand Finale
Dishes	Main	Pork Spare Ribs with Fried Green Beans and Rice							Through to Grand Finale
Dishes	Dessert	Orange & Hazelnut Cake with Mandarin Syrup and Roasted Hazelnut							Through to Grand Finale
SA	Anne-Marie & Nick	7	7	7	7	6	6	40	Eliminated
Dishes	Entrée	King George Whiting Roll with Lemon Butter Sauce							Eliminated
Dishes	Main	Stuffed Veal and Salsa Verde with Artichoke Purée							Eliminated
Dishes	Dessert	Fried Custard with Fresh Raspberries and Cream							Eliminated

=== Grand Finale ===
- Episode 33
- Airdate — 13 April 2011
- Description — Each finalist cooked a five-course meal, with 20 plates per course for the eliminated teams, friends and family. The guest judges then scored their dishes for a final verdict.

Grand Final Results
Grand Final
Team		Judge's Scores						Total (out of 60)	Result
Team		Karen	Tobie	Liz	Guy	Pete	Manu	Total (out of 60)	Result
NSW	Sammy & Bella	10	9	10	9	9	9	56	Winners
Dishes		Olka Polka!							Winners
1st Course		Raw Kingfish with Cuttlefish Ceviche							Winners
2nd Course		Porcini Mushroom Risotto							Winners
3rd Course		Pan Fried Blue-Eye Trevalla							Winners
4th Course		Prosciutto Wrapped Stuffed Quail							Winners
5th Course		Pear & Almond Tart with Saffron Ice Cream							Winners
VIC	Kane & Lee	9	9	9	8	9	8	52	Runners-up
Dishes		Masquerade							Runners-up
1st Course		Crab and Avocado Stack							Runners-up
2nd Course		Agedashi Tofu with Pork Gyoza							Runners-up
3rd Course		Chargrilled Octopus, Blue Eye Trevalla and Smoked Scallop							Runners-up
4th Course		Beef Sukiyaki Broth							Runners-up
5th Course		Sake Sautéed Figs with Sesame Balls							Runners-up

== Ratings ==
Colour Key:
– Highest Rating
– Lowest Rating
– Elimination Episode
– Finals Week

Wk.	Episode		Air date	Viewers (in millions)	Nightly rank	Source
1	1	Instant restaurant 1–1: Artie & Johnnie	Monday, 31 January	1.205	#5	
1	2	Instant restaurant 1–2: Kane & Lee	Tuesday, 1 February	1.278	#3	
1	3	Instant restaurant 1–3: Sammy & Bella	Wednesday, 2 February	1.146	#6	
2	4	Instant restaurant 1–4: Donna & Reade	Monday, 7 February	1.332	#2	
2	5	Instant restaurant 1–5: Melanie & James	Tuesday, 8 February	1.551	#2	
2	6	Instant restaurant 1–6: Daniela & Stefania	Wednesday, 9 February	1.400	#1	
3	7	Instant restaurant 2–1: Mal & Bec	Monday, 14 February	1.191	#2	
3	8	Instant restaurant 2–2: Kelly & Ash	Tuesday, 15 February	1.432	#2	
3	9	Instant restaurant 2–3: Esther & Ali	Wednesday, 16 February	1.386	#1	
4	10	Instant restaurant 2–4: Bill & Alex	Monday, 21 February	1.457	#1	
4	11	Instant restaurant 2–5: Anne-Marie & Nick	Tuesday, 22 February	1.626	#2	
4	12	Instant restaurant 2–6: Kerry & Holly; Instant Restaurant Sudden Death	Wednesday, 23 February	1.384	#2	
5	13	People's Choice Challenge: Street Party	Monday, 28 February	1.461	#1	
5	14	Kitchen Cook off 1	Tuesday, 1 March	1.595	#2	
5	15	Sudden Death 1	Wednesday, 2 March	1.394	#1	
6	16	People's Choice Challenge: Channel 7 Studios Breakfast	Monday, 7 March	1.406	#1	
6	17	Kitchen Cook off 2	Tuesday, 8 March	1.428	#2	
6	18	Sudden Death 2	Wednesday, 9 March	1.325	#1	
7	19	People's Choice Challenge: Children's Festival	Monday, 14 March	1.373	#2	
7	20	Kitchen Cook off 3	Tuesday, 15 March	1.424	#2	
7	21	Sudden Death 3	Wednesday, 16 March	1.360	#1	
8	22	People's Choice Challenge: Outdoor Picnic	Monday, 21 March	1.391	#3	
8	23	Kitchen Cook off 4	Tuesday, 22 March	1.552	#2	
8	24	Sudden Death 4	Wednesday, 23 March	1.333	#1	
9	25	People's Choice Challenge: NT Outback Adventure	Monday, 28 March	1.444	#1	
9	26	Kitchen Cook off 5	Tuesday, 29 March	1.499	#2	
9	27	Kitchen Cook off 6	Wednesday, 30 March	1.426	#1	
10	28	Urban Challenge: Chinese Cuisine; Sudden Death	Monday, 4 April	1.388	#1	
10	29	Kitchen Cook off 7	Tuesday, 5 April	1.424	#1	
10	30	Sudden Death 5	Wednesday, 6 April	1.352	#1	
11	31	Semi-final 1	Monday, 11 April	1.517	#1	
11	32	Semi-final 2	Tuesday, 12 April	1.604	#1	
11	33	Grand Final	Wednesday, 13 April	1.719	#2	
11	33	Winner Announcement	Wednesday, 13 April	2.020	#1	
Series Average				1.426	#2	
