= Belle (given name) =

Belle is a feminine given name meaning "beautiful". It may also be a short form (hypocorism) of Isabella, Isabel or variations thereof.

== People ==
- Belle Kendrick Abbott (1842–1893), American author
- Belle Baker (1893–1957), American singer and actress
- Belle Baranceanu (1902–1988), American artist
- Belle Barth (1911–1971), Jewish-American entertainer
- Belle Benchley (1882–1972), American director of the San Diego Zoo from 1927 to 1953
- Belle Bennett (1891–1932), American stage and screen actress
- Belle Boyd (1843–1900), Confederate spy during the American Civil War
- Belle Brezing (1860–1940), American brothel owner, believed to be the model for Belle Watling in Gone with the Wind
- Belle Chrystall (1910–2003), British actress
- Belle Chuo (born 1986), Taiwanese actress
- Belle Cole (1845–1905), American singer
- Belle Cooledge (1884–1955), American politician, first female mayor of Sacramento, California
- Belle Delphine (born 1999), South African internet celebrity
- Belle Gibson (born 1991) Australian convicted scammer
- Belle Gordon (born c. 1880), American vaudeville performer and boxer
- Belle Gunness (1859–1908), Norwegian-American female serial killer
- Belle R. Harrison (1856–1940), American author
- Belle Kinney Scholz (1890–1959), Euro-American sculptor
- Belle Goshorn MacCorkle (1841–1923), American former First Lady of West Virginia
- Belle Mariano (born 2002), Filipina actress, model and singer
- Belle Mitchell (1889–1979), American film actress
- Belle Montrose (1886–1963), Irish-American actress and vaudeville performer born Isabelle Donohue
- Belle Moore (1894–1975), Scottish freestyle swimmer
- Belle Moskowitz (1877–1933), political advisor to New York Governor and 1928 presidential candidate Al Smith
- Belle Perez, stage name of Maribel Pérez (born 1976), Flemish musician and songwriter
- Belle L. Pettigrew (1839–1912), American educator, missionary
- Belle Reynolds (1840–1937), American heroine of the American Civil War
- Belle Hunt Shortridge (1858–1893), American author
- Belle Skinner (1866–1928), American businesswoman
- Belle Starr (1848–1889), American outlaw born Myra Maybelle Shirley Reed Starr
- Belle Story (c. 1887–?), American vaudeville performer and singer
- Belle Fligelman Winestine (1891–1985) American writer and suffragist

== Fictional characters ==
- Belle, from the fairy tale Beauty and the Beast
- Belle (Disney character), from the 1991 Disney film Beauty and the Beast, based on the fairy tale
- Belle (Once Upon a Time) (maiden name French, married name Gold), a character from the ABC television series Once Upon a Time
- Belle Black, from the NBC soap opera Days of Our Lives
- Belle Dingle, from the ITV soap opera Emmerdale
- Belle Dupree, from the CBS sitcom Alice
- Belle Taylor, from the Seven Network soap opera Home and Away
- Belle the Sleeping Car, in Andrew Lloyd Webber's musical Starlight Express
- Belle, a character in The Muppet Christmas Carol
- Belle (ベル) / Suzu Naito (内藤鈴), the main protagonist of the 2021 anime film Belle
- Belle Fontiere, a character (Lucks' right-hand girl, Tari's rival, and secondary antagonist) from the animated web series Meta Runner
- Belle the Tinkerer, from the Sonic the Hedgehog comics published by IDW
- Belle Pepper, a character from Sanjay and Craig
- Belle, a playable character from the action role-playing video game Zenless Zone Zero

== See also ==
- Bella
