= Bella Longuinho =

Brazilian influencer (born 2002)

- Born: Isabella Longuinho; 20 February 2002 (age 24); Santa Rita do Sapucaí, Minas Gerais, Brazil
- Occupations: Digital influencer, TikToker
- Years active: 2020–present

Bella Longuinho is the stage name of Isabella Longuinho (born in Santa Rita do Sapucaí on 20 February 2002), a Brazilian digital influencer and content creator. She gained notoriety for her frequent presence on social media with content about her fitness routine and beauty tips, as well as her trans activism, possessing approximately 5 million followers across TikTok and Instagram. Her trajectory has been compared to that of former model Roberta Close.

== Biography ==
Born in Santa Rita do Sapucaí, in the south of Minas Gerais, Bella began her internet career in 2020 on TikTok, going viral the following year after dancing to the song "No Chão Novinha" by Anitta and Pedro Sampaio in the Swiss Alps.

Starting in 2025, she gained more visibility by sharing her gender transition journey, which included a gender-affirming surgery in Thailand.

== Personal life ==
On her social media, Bella highlights the support she receives from her family in her gender transition.

On 9 June 2026, Bella announced the end of her relationship after reporting that she had been assaulted by her boyfriend during a party at a nightclub. Hours before the influencer's public statement, a social media user who claimed to have witnessed the assault filed a police report to denounce the case.
