= Honoured Cultural Worker of the RSFSR =

1964–1991 Soviet title of honour

Honorary title Honoured Cultural Worker of the RSFSR
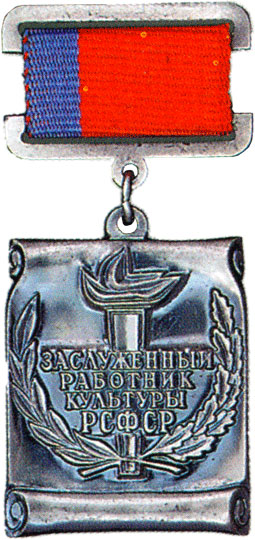
- A chest badge "Honoured Cultural Worker of the RSFSR"
- Type: Honorary title
- Presented by: Russia
- Eligibility: Citizens of the Russian Soviet Federative Socialist Republic
- Status: No longer awarded
- Established: May 26,1964

Honoured Cultural Worker of the RSFSR (Russian: Заслуженный работник культуры РСФСР, romanized: Zasluzhennyy rabotnik kultury RSFSR) was an honorary title given by the Russian Soviet Federative Socialist Republic to qualified employees of institutions and organizations involved in culture, art, education, printing, print, radio and television. The nominees are participants of amateur creativity, many involved in volunteer work in their organizations and institutions. They have to have worked in the field for 15 or more years. The person is honored for his merits in the promotion, popularization, and preservation of culture. The title was established on May 26, 1964.
