= Henri Roger Ouellet =

Canadian ornithologist

- Born: 1938; Rivière-du-Loup, Quebec
- Died: 1999 (aged 60–61); Hull, Quebec
- Education: University of New Brunswick; McGill University
- Occupation: Ornithologist
- Known for: Curator at the National Museum of Canada; Reclassifying Bicknell's thrush

Henri Roger Ouellet (29 January 1938 – 9 January 1999) was a Canadian ornithologist. He worked on avian faunistics, ecology, behaviour and also worked for sometime as a curator at the National Museum of Canada.

Ouellet was born in Riviere-du-Loup, Québec as son of Charles Eugene and Antonia Dubé. He went to study at Externat Classique and became interested in taxidermy at the age of 13 and learned (along with his friend Raymond McNeil) to prepare bird skins at the age of 16, taught in College de Ste-Anne in Sainte-Anne-de-la-Pocatière, by Rev. Rene Tanguay. He worked on summers in specimen preparation at the National Museum from around 1957. The family moved to Quebec City in 1955 and he obtained a B.L. in French and history in 1958 at the Academe de Quebec followed by a BA in biology from the University of New Brunswick in 1962. His summers of 1959 and 61 were spent surveying birds on Anticosti Island. He worked as a naturalist at Point Pelee National Park and joined the Redpath Museum, McGill University in 1965. He also obtained an MS in zoology in 1967 from McGill. He then began a PhD under Peter R. Grant and A.W. Cameron and received a doctorate in 1977 for work on the biosystematics and ecology of hairy and downy woodpeckers. In 1977 he succeeded W. Earl Godfrey as curator of bird at the National Museum of Natural Sciences in Ottawa where he worked as an assistant. In 1991 the museum abolished the role of curators and he worked as a researcher and in 1994 all researchers were fired but he continued to work in an honorary position.

Ouellet published numerous researches on zoogeography, ecology, and behavior. Along with Dan Strickland he published in the Birds of North America. He was involved in the standardization of French names for North American birds along with Michel Gosselin. He also published three papers on the history of Canadian ornithology in the 20th century. He contributed several bird-related entries to the Canadian Encyclopaedia (1985 edition). From 1988 to 1992 he helped Transport Canada in identification of birds from remains found after aircraft bird collisions. He attended the Ornithological Congresses regularly, and at the 1982 meeting in Moscow he spoke on Soviet television. He was involved in organizing the 1986 congress at Ottawa and editing the proceedings. In 1995 his studies led to the raising of Bicknell's thrush from a subspecies to a full species.

He died at his home in Hull, Quebec and was survived by his wife and son.
