= Bella Shteinbuk =

Israeli pianist and educator (born 1960)

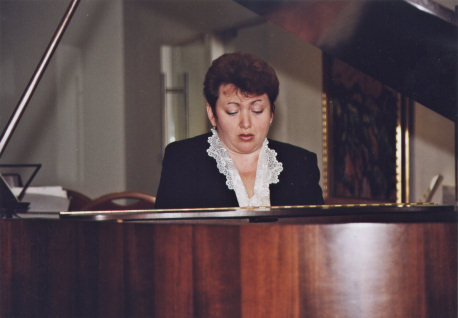
Bella Shteinbuk

Bella Shteinbuk (Hebrew: בלה שטיינבוק; Russian: Белла Штейнбук; born 31 March 1960, Belarus) is an Israeli pianist and educator.

== Biography ==
Shteinbuk was born in Babruysk, Belarus in 1960. Her mother was a teacher, and her father, Gennady Shteinbuk, was a football and ice hockey coach, coaching for FC Belshina Bobruisk and Shinnik Bobruisk. At the age of five, Shteinbuk began to study piano. Later on, she left her hometown and relocated to Minsk, where she studied music at school and the Conservatory of Minsk. While there, Shteinbuk also attended the Music Academy of Minsk, from which she received an advanced title. In 1994, she moved to Israel with her husband and son. During her early years in Israel, she focused mainly on teaching piano, rarely performing for large audiences. After a year in Herzliya, where she taught piano at the conservatory, the family moved to Rishon LeZion. Shteinbuk later separated from her first husband, and currently still resides in Rishon LeZion. In August 2010, she married clarinetist Vladimir Chernomordik.

== Career ==
=== 1989-1999 ===
In 1991, Shteinbuk joined the "Classic Avantgarde" soloist ensemble in Minsk. She performed with the group until 1994.

During this time, she appeared at several major music festivals worldwide:

- 1989, Vitebsk, Belarus – Sulrtinsky (Sollertinsky) International Festival
- 1991, Helsinki, Finland – Festival of Modern Music
- 1992, Gelsenkirchen, Germany – III Gaida Forum Festival of New Music
- 1992, Lviv, Ukraine – III International Music Art Festival Virtuosos
- 1992, Padua, Italy – Biennale
- 1992, Venice, Italy – Biennale
- 1992–1994, Minsk, Belarus – Ancient Belarusian Music Festival "Revival of the Belarusian Capella"
- 1993, Bonn, Germany – Bonner Summer–93 International Music Festival
- 1993, Kaliningrad, Russia – XIII International Arts Festival Amber Necklace
- 1993, Kishinjev, Moldova – New Music Festival
- 1993, Kudowa-Zdrój, Poland – XXXII Festiwal Moniuszkowski
- 1993, Minsk(Belarus)- Warsaw-Gdansk (Poland) – Polish-Belarusian Musical Meetings Minsk-Warsaw-Gdansk
- 1993, Vilnius, Lithuania – III Baltic Music Festival
- 1994, Berlin, Germany – Kreuzberger Hofkonzerte Im Podewil
- In 1995, Shteinbuk performed at the International Tchaikovsky Competition for Young Musicians Sendai, Japan

From 1995 on, Shteinbuk taught music at the Conservatory of Kfar Saba, Israel.

=== 2000-Present ===
At the turn of the millennium, she recorded several albums, including two international albums recorded in Canada. During the decade, she appeared in many international festivals, including festivals in Mexico, Canada, the United States and Spain.

Between 2004 and 2005, she took part in the "Three Tenors" (Gabi Sadeh, Yotam Cohen, and Felix Livshitz) show in the United States, as well as the finals "Film Festival" in Toronto, Canada (European Union Film Festival).

From 2004 on, she played in the Israeli ensemble Bellamiya.

On 26 May 2008, she appeared at the Festival 10 San Miguel de Allende, Mexico.

In 2010, she performed three concerts in New York City.

In March 2011, she appeared at the Chamber Music Festival in Eilat, Israel, together with famous British violinist Chloe Hanslip.

On 17 October 2012 she performed at the XXXVІII International Festival of Arts "Belarusian Musical Autumn": International Music Forum "Belarusians of the world" with an ensemble of "Classic-Avantgarde" soloists in Minsk.

Between 13–15 November 2012, Bella taught several masters classes in Belarus, including some at the Belarusian State Academy of Music in Minsk and the Minsk State Music College.

On 15 November 2012, she appeared as part of a festive concert celebrating 20 years of friendship between Russia and Israel, held in Minsk. The concert was covered extensively in the media of the Jewish community in Belarus. In 2011, Shteinbuk was nominated for the title of "Man of the Year" in Rishon LeZion in the category of music and art of the former Soviet Union. By 2014 she had made appearances at festivals and concert halls in Israel, including the Mann Auditorium in Tel Aviv, Tsavta TA, Abu Gosh Festival, and in the "Marathon Operatic" International Music Festival in Eilat. As of early 2014, Shteinbuk teaches music at the Conservatory of Kfar Saba and occasionally holds concerts.
