= Vincenzo La Bella =

Italian painter

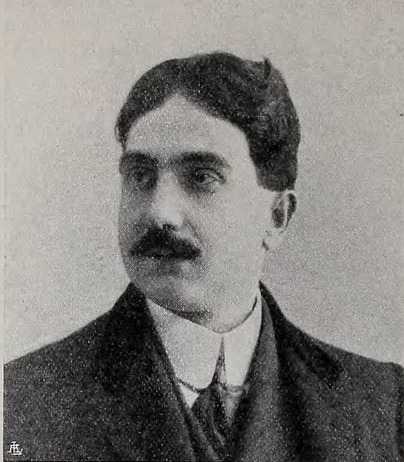
- Born: October 24, 1872; Naples, Italy
- Died: December 26, 1954 (aged 82); Naples, Italy
- Occupation: painter
- Years active: 1890–1954

Vincenzo La Bella (October 24, 1872 – December 26, 1954) was an Italian painter. He worked on costume painting, portraiture, interior decoration, illustration, lithography, poster design, and art criticism.

== Biography ==
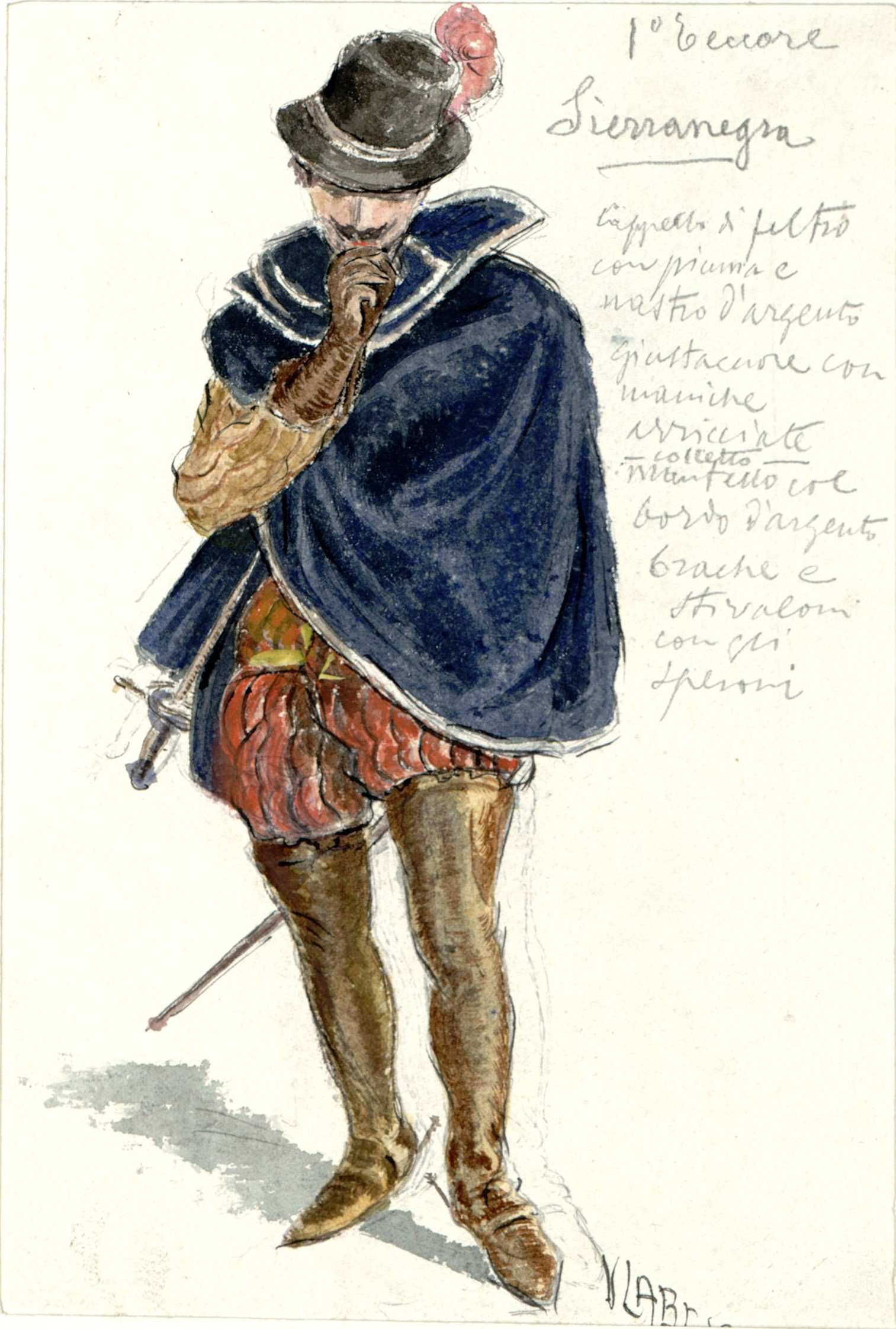
Fashion sketch for La fiamminga (1922).

Vincenzo La Bella was born in Naples in 1872. He attended the Institute of Fine Arts in Naples, where he studied under the guidance of Gioacchino Toma and Domenico Morelli. He was fascinated and carefully studied the paintings, exhibited in the National Museum's picture gallery, of the Neapolitan and Bolognese schools. In 1890, he held his first official exhibition, and in 1892, he started his career as an illustrator in Paris, collaborating with the magazine Le Monde illustré. Until 1897, he created drawings representing the everyday life and customs of the society of that time. In France, he garnered acclaim, becoming close friends with Camille Flammarion, for whom he created a portrait. He also completed around sixty black and white compositions, commissioned to illustrate the Tales of Mystery and Imagination by Edgar Allan Poe.

He returned to Naples in 1897, where he continued his work as an illustrator for various books and publications. In 1900, he collaborated for a few months with the newly established periodical Italia ride. In the same year, he participated in an illustration contest organized by Vittorio Alinari for a new edition of the Divine Comedy, presented at the I International Exhibition of Modern Decorative Art in Turin.

Starting from 1901, he created drawings and portraits of artistic and theatrical personalities to the art magazine Il Mezzogiorno artistico, including one of Eleonora Duse. In 1902, he exhibited illustrations for the Eighth and Ninth Cantos of Dante's Inferno at the First International Exhibition of "Bianco e Nero" in Rome. In the years following 1904, after a brief stay of about a year in New York, where he continued working as an illustrator for magazines and newspapers, he resumed his painting career. In Naples, he created two frescoes in the examination room and vestibule on the first floor of the university building on Corso Umberto I. These frescoes depict Roberto d'Angiò, Petrarch and the tragic end of Hypatia. Vincenzo La Bella resumed collaborations with periodicals and newspapers, including Il Mattino illustrato, Il Roma della domenica, L'Arte muta (a film life review), and the Milanese magazine Varietas. Between 1898 and 1918, he designed numerous covers for songs published by music publishers Santojanni, Pierro, and Alfano.

In the late 19th and early 20th centuries, he was a frequent guest at cultural circles and intellectual salons in Naples, where he portrayed women of Neapolitan aristocracy. He was a particularly regular visitor to the home of the painter Eduardo Dalbono and the historic Gambrinus café, a gathering place for artists, writers, and politicians, where he also participated in decorating the salon. Starting in the 1910s, he became an art teacher at the San Carlo all'Arena in Naples, alongside Carlo Siviero. He continued to participate in national and international public exhibitions. In 1921, he exhibited at the First Naples Biennial and the First Rome Biennial, in 1922 at the Florentine Spring Exhibition, and in 1924, he was a member of the regional Campania commission for the Second International Exhibition of Decorative Arts, held in Monza the following year.

Vincenzo La Bella died in Naples on December 26, 1954, after spending his final years at home, yet continuing to work.
