= Bella Clara Landauer =

American collector

- Born: Bella Clara Fackenthal; 1874; New York City
- Died: 1960 (aged 85–86)
- Spouse: Isidor Nathan Landauer
- Children: 2

Bella Clara Landauer, born Bella Clara Fackenthal (1874–1960) was an American collector of ephemera, sheet music, and manufacturing trade cards who also became a self-taught historian of commercial art and printing.

== Biography ==
Bella Clara Fackenthal, the only child of a corset manufacturer, was born in New York in 1874. For a short time she attended the Hewitt School, where she became interested in topics such as opera and theater, and developed a lifelong passion for learning in general. However, because her father disapproved of women being able to attend college, she did not pursue further formal education. In 1900 she married Isidor Nathan Landauer — a first-generation German immigrant, successful fabric importer and salesman — and they had two children, born in 1902 and 1906 respectively.

During World War I she served in the American Volunteer Field Service (AFS Intercultural Programs), but suffered ill health as a result, and in 1923 her doctor recommended that she follow less taxing pursuits. This recommendation, along with her eclectic interests, eventually led to her pursuing a career as a collector.

Her first purchase was a portfolio of bookplates bought for $100 from a picture framer. It eventually emerged that this had been stolen, by which time Landauer's collection was well-established. As she built her bookplate collection, Landauer endeavoured to learn more about the field from other notable collectors. Among these was William E. Baille, who was initially suspicious when Landauer expanded her interests to include the collection of manufacturing trade cards, but was eventually convinced of its historical value to future researchers. Despite lacking a formal education in advertising and commercial art, Landauer understood how collecting examples of early advertising would prove valuable, and this soon became her primary focus. She also began collecting wine bottle labels, funerary advertisements, aeronautical sheet music, and other forms of graphic and advertising art, focusing mainly on 19th century material.

Landauer's collection of ephemera — particularly her trade cards — grew substantially as she sought material exemplifying various aspects of advertising. In 1926, following a move to the Drake Hotel, she gave her already significant collection of over 100,000 trade cards to the New York Historical Society, where she was made an unpaid honorary curator and continued to collect, catalog, and conduct research on the collection. She also donated duplicates from her collections, along with additional ephemera, to the Drawings and Prints department of the Metropolitan Museum of Art and the Harvard University Library. As her interests expanded, Bella turned her attention to other forms of sheet music, aeronautical history and theater programs.

Landauer's interest in aeronautics was initiated by her son becoming a pilot. She responded by joining the Institute of the Aeronautical Sciences (now known as the American Institute of Aeronautics and Astronautics), which became the first organisation to host her historically significant collection of over 1,000 pieces of sheet music. This collection covers the history of aeronautics and aviation from its beginnings to the early 20th century, and includes one of the earliest examples of aeronautical sheet music ever published: Chanson sur le Globe Aerostatique, a musical homage to the earliest balloon flights made by the Montgolfier brothers and printed in 1785. The collection is now part of the Smithsonian Institution Libraries' National Air and Space Museum Library, and is known as the Bella C. Landauer Collection of Aeronautical Sheet Music.

Throughout her life, Landauer not only collated and shared numerous significant collections of advertising, graphic arts, and commercial printing material, but also researched and published extensively in these fields. Moreover, she acted as an adviser to several colleges on the history of commercial art and printing. She believed that advertising and commercial art were a reflection of the times in which they were created, and never more so than in the 19th century. Her work focused largely on New York City — as the center of American advertising (and as her lifelong home) — but her interests were international, as her collections of aeronautical sheet music, trade cards, and other ephemera reflect.

Landauer continued collecting and researching until her death in 1960.

Her great-grandson is actor James Widdoes.

== Gallery ==
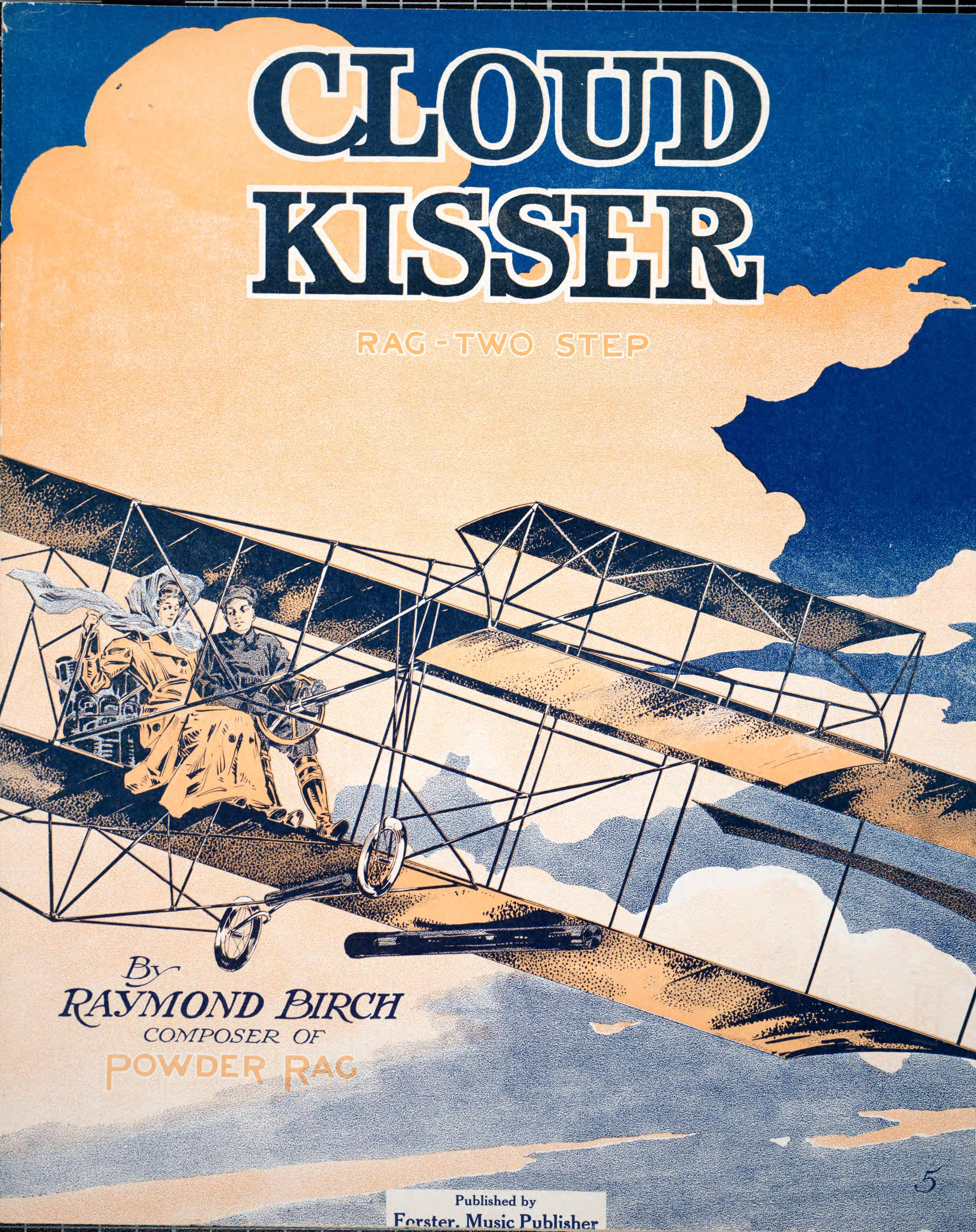
Sheet music cover illustration for "Cloud Kisser"

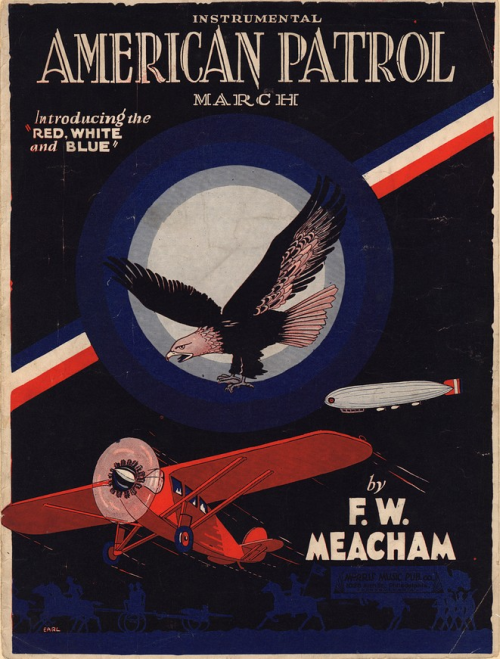
Sheet music cover for "American Patrol"

== Collections ==
- New York Historical Society: Bella C. Landauer Collection of Business and Advertising Ephemera Guide to the Bella C. Landauer Collection of Business and Advertising Ephemera ca. 1700-present PR 31
- Smithsonian Institution Libraries: Bella C. Landauer Collection of Aeronautical Sheet Music.Bella C. Landauer Collection of Aeronautical Sheet Music || Introduction
- Library of Congress: Landauer collection of aeronautical prints and drawings LC Catalog - Item Information (Full Record)
- Metropolitan Museum of Art: Gift to the Drawings and Prints Department
- New York Public Library: Gift of trade cards, sheet music, and other ephemera The New York Public Library
- Dartmouth College, Rauner Library: Guide to the Bella C. Landauer Collection of Eugene O'Neill, circa 1915 - 1941 Found 1 Results | Dartmouth Library Archives & Manuscripts

== Publications ==
- Literary Illusions in American Advertising as Sources of Social History. New York Historical Society Quarterly. July 1947, 148–149.
- Collecting and Recollecting. New York Historical Society Quarterly. July 1959, 335–349.
- My City 'Tis of Thee: New York City on Sheet-Music Covers. 1951.
- Some American Funeral Ephemera. New York Historical Society Quarterly. April 1952, 221–230.
- Printers' Mottoes: A Collection of Sentiments Taken From Title-pages and Colophons of Books Issued By Printers and Publishers, Booksellers, Artists and Patrons From the Fifteenth Century to the Present. New York: Privately Printed, 1926.
