= Bella Thomasson =

British bookmaker

"Bella" Thomason
- Born: Ann Arabella Clarke; 1874; Nether Hallam, Yorkshire
- Died: November 11, 1959 (aged 84–85); Bolton
- Occupation: bookmaker
- Known for: running an illegal bookies
- Spouse: Stephen (Steve) Thomason

Ann "Bella" Thomason or Ann Arabella Thomason; Bella Thomasson (1874 – 11 November 1959) was a British bookmaker who created a model betting shop in Bolton. Her business was successful, innovative and illegal.

== Life ==
"Bella" Thomason was born in 1874 in Nether Hallam in Yorkshire. She married Stephen Thomason who was a labourer in an ironworks where he supplemented his income by taking bets. The couple used these profits and a £200 winning bet when visiting Bolton to buy a shop that was nominally a tobacconists but was actually a base for illegal betting. At the time, the Betting Houses Act 1853 made it illegal to take cash for a bet except at a racecourse. Stephen was taken to court in 1905 and fined. It was considered that he should take responsibility for any crimes committed by his wife. Stephen promised not to take any more bets at his shop and paid a £25 fine, but the betting continued and by 1924 the business was well known as an illegal bookmakers. The business was nominally a tobacconist but it was an open secret that it sold no cigarettes. Women were not allowed to enter and swearing was not allowed. The fine for offences was £100 in 1924, but then, all pretence had gone as they installed a ticker tape machine to deliver results before their local competitors.

During the war, there was no horse or dog-racing and her husband became ill. However, after the war, Bella, as she was known reopened "Bella's" after taking another business partner, Albert Hampson. Their betting shop was in Great Moor Street Bolton, and its business was obvious. The shop employed a man to read aloud the ticker tape as it arrived creating a professional and very profitable betting shop. The resulting business is considered a model for later (legal) betting shops. Bella dressed smartly and was known for her honesty in paying out on bets two years after the race had finished. Her biographer, Carl Chinn, considers it likely that the business was frequently paying the police to avoid prosecution.

Thomason died in Bolton in 1959, two years before off-course bookmaking was legalized in the UK.
