= Di Bella =

Di Bella, or DiBella, is an Italian matronymic surname form the medieval female personal name Bella. Notable people with the surname include:

- Carmelo Di Bella (1921–1992), Italian footballer and manager
- Fabrizio Di Bella (born 1988), Italian footballer
- Jonathan Di Bella (born 1996), Italian-Canadian kickboxer
- Luigi di Bella (1912–2003), Italian physiologist and writer
- Paul Di Bella (born 1977), Australian sprinter
- Rosario Di Bella (born 1963), Italian singer-songwriter and composer
- Vincenzo Di Bella (born 1977), Italian rally driver

DiBella

- Laura DiBella, American governmental affairs advisor and civil servant
- Lou DiBella (born 1960), American boxing promoter and minor league baseball team owner
- Thomas DiBella (1905–1988), American mobster
- William A. DiBella (born 1943), American politician and businessman

== See also ==
- DiBella (disambiguation)
