= Bella Nisan =

Russian ophthalmologist

- Белла Нисан
- Born: Derbent, USSR
- Scientific career
- Fields: Ophthalmology
- Institutions: unemployed
- Thesis: Клинико-физиологический метод коррекции нарушений зрения при заболеваниях сетчатки и зрительного нерва, как альтернатива хирургическим методам лечения

Bella Alexandrovna Nisan (Russian: Белла Александровна Нисан) is a Russian ophthalmologist, founder of modern methods of vision disorder correction. She is a member of the American Academy of Ophthalmology and a well-known proponent of the use of jet-injection devices in medicine.

== Biography ==
Bella Nisan left school in 1976 and graduated from The Second Pirogov Medical University of Order of Lenin (now Pirogov National Medical Research University) in 1982. During 1985-1987 Nisan was a head of Complex and Special Vision Correction Laboratory of Moscow Healthcare Department. From 1987 to 1991, she was A Chief Doctor of the Optical Salon of Eye Microsurgery Complex (currently Fyodorov Eye Microsurgery Complex).

From 1991 to 1995, Nisan worked in the Contact, Complex and Special Vision Correction Center under auspices of Professor I. Elyakim in Tel Aviv (Israel); from 1995 to 1998 she was a head of Bausch & Lomb Company's professional service (former USSR Department). In 2000, Nisan's work, devoted to the clinical and physiological methods of vision correction of retina and optic nerve diseases, became widely known in academic community. At that period, Nisan received her PhD in medicine.

From 1998 until 2001, Nisan was a head lecturer of Optometry and Contact Vision correction Course of Vision disease department at the Federation Institute for Biomedical Problems of the Healthcare Ministry of the Russian Federation. In 2001, Nisan became an associate professor. From 2001 to 2011 she was a head of the Eye Disease Department of Pediatrics at Russian State Medical University (now Pirogov National Medical Research University).

Since 2011, Nisan has been a leading expert at Moscow Healthcare Department. Nowadays, she is a Fellow of the International Association of Contact Lens Educators and the European Academy of Natural Sciences and the author of over 50 publications in international medical resources.

== Notable works ==
- Children and contact lenses. 2005
- Correction of slight astigmatism using soft toric contact lenses. 2011
- International aspects of vision impairment — socially significant pathology — preventive measures. 2012
