= Bella Duffy =

Irish translator and writer

Arabella Jane Duffy
- Born: Arabella Jane Duffy; 1849
- Died: 1926 (aged 76–77); London

Bella Duffy (1849–1926), was an Irish translator and writer who spent most of her life in Italy.

== Biography ==
Arabella Jane Duffy was born in Ireland in 1849. Duffy was known as Bella. She spent most of her life living in Florence, Italy. She met Vernon Lee in 1878 and they became life long friends. Lee dedicated one of her books to her as did Eugene Lee-Hamilton. Although she wrote a fiction novel, Duffy was best known for her non fiction and translation work. She fought for the protection of Ancient buildings during her time in Italy. She died in London in 1926.

== Bibliography ==
- Winifred Power, (1883)
- Madame de Staël, (1887)
- The Tuscan Republics, (1892)
- Mnemic psychology, (1923) Translation
