= Bella Kurkova =

Soviet journalist (1935–2023)

Bela Alekseevna Kurkova
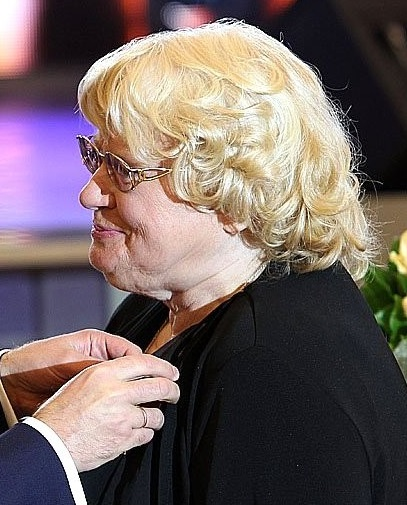
- Bela Kurkova at the ceremony of awarding the Order of Merit to the Fatherland, 4th degree, November 17, 2011.
- Born: December 26, 1935; Bryansk, Soviet Union
- Died: January 19, 2023 (aged 87); Saint Petersburg, Russia
- Resting place: Smolensky Cemetery
- Occupations: presenter, journalist and producer
- Years active: 1968 - 2000
- Television: 5TV (Russian TV channel)
- Awards: Order "For Merit to the Fatherland" (2011 and 2021); Order of Friendship (2008); Medal "Defender of a Free Russia" (1993); Medal "In Commemoration of the 300th Anniversary of Saint Petersburg" (2003); Honoured Cultural Worker of the RSFSR (1985)

Bela Alekseevna Kurkova (December 26, 1935, Bryansk, Soviet Union – January 19, 2023, Saint Petersburg, Russia) was a presenter, journalist and producer of Soviet Union and Russian television. She was also the director general of 5TV Russian TV channel (1992–1995). She received awards such as the Honoured Cultural Worker of the RSFSR (1985).

== Life ==
Bella Kurkova Born on December 26, 1935, in Bryansk. In 1959, she graduated from the Faculty of Journalism of Saint Petersburg State University. After graduating, she worked for about three years as a reporter for the Sotskaya Chukotka newspaper in the village of Pevek, Chukotka National District. From June 7, 1991, to July 3, 2000, she was the director of the Leningrad branch of the All-Russian State Television and Radio Company (VGTRK).

Since October 1992, she headed the Federal Television and Radio Broadcasting Service "Russia" (FTS - Russian TV), which was created on the basis of the St. Petersburg Television Company and was dissolved by order of Boris Yeltsin. Later, on Yeltsin's orders, the Russian Broadcasting Service was renamed the State Television and Radio Company of St. Petersburg. In 1995, Kurkova was forced to resign as the head of the television company.

Kurkova made two dozen serial films about St. Petersburg during her career. In total, her filmography includes more than 200 documentaries. She died on January 19, 2023, in St. Petersburg at the age of 88 after a long illness. She was buried in the Smolensk cemetery on January 23.

== Awards ==
- Order "For Merit to the Fatherland" III degree (July 11, 2021) - for great contribution to the development of the media and many years of fruitful activity.
- Order "For Merit to the Fatherland" IV degree (November 16, 2011) - for great services in the development of domestic television and radio broadcasting and many years of fruitful activity.
- Order of Friendship (February 7, 2008) - for her great contribution to the development of domestic television and radio broadcasting and many years of fruitful activity.
- Medal "Defender of a Free Russia" (August 18, 1993) - for the performance of civic duty in defending democracy and the constitutional order on August 19–21, 1991.
- Medal "In Commemoration of the 300th Anniversary of Saint Petersburg" (2003)
- Honoured Cultural Worker of the RSFSR (September 25, 1985) - for services in the field of Soviet culture and many years of fruitful work.
