= Bella Brisel =

Israeli painter and graphic artist (1929–1982)

Bella Brisel בלה בריזל
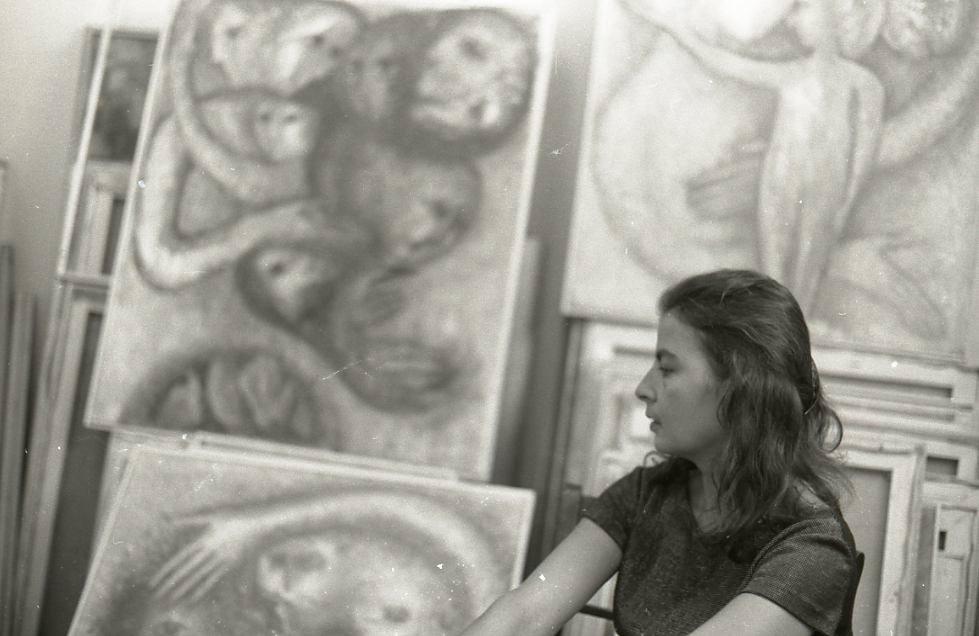
- Born: 23 August 1929; Tiberias, Mandatory Palestine
- Died: 1 November 1982 (aged 53); Tel Aviv, Israel
- Resting place: Mount of Olives Jewish Cemetery
- Education: Ecole des Beaux-Arts, Paris
- Known for: Painting and graphic art
- Spouse: Sioma Baram
- Awards: Award of the Paris Salon Exhibition of Foreign Artists (1953); French Art Critics Prize (1954); Israeli Painters in Paris Prize (1955)

Bella Brisel (Hebrew: בלה בריזל; 23 August 1929 – 1 November 1982) was an Israeli painter and graphic artist. Her art is characterized by expressive, atmospheric compositions that blend figurative and abstract elements. Her works often feature delicate yet dynamic forms, evoking a sense of movement and emotion through subtle color harmonies and layered textures.

== Biography ==
Bella Brisel was born in Tiberias into a Jewish ultra-Orthodox family from the Old Yishuv. In 1944 the family moved to Jerusalem where she studied at the Bet Yaakov Seminary. In 1946, after attending her first art exhibition, she decided to become an artist and moved to Tel Aviv alone. There, she studied painting under Avigdor Stematsky and Yehezkel Streichman at their Studia Art School, where she also took lessons with Marcel Janco.

In Studia she met the artist Sioma Baram, whom she married in 1949. From 1949 the couple lived in Paris, where Brisel studied fresco painting at the École des Beaux-Arts.

Starting in 1955, the couple made their permanent home on the Spanish island of Formentera, with occasional short visits to Paris and Israel. Their life story inspired the French writer Jacques Peuchmaurd to write the novel The Sun of Palicorna; in 1974, they appeared in its cinematic adaptation.

In 1954, a book of religious poems by Judah Halevi, Chants mystiques/Adaptés par Bruno Durocher, illustrated with 12 lithographs by Brisel, was published in Paris.

In 1980 Sioma Baram died in Formentera. Brisel moved to Tel Aviv in 1981 where she produced a book on Baram's oeuvre. She died in 1982 and was buried on the Mount of Olives Jewish Cemetery in Jerusalem.

In 1988, the Baram-Brisel Gallery was established in their names in Formentera and remained active until the early 1990s.

== Artistic style ==
Brisel's artistic development can be divided into three distinct periods, each marking a unique evolution in style and expression. (Note: Such periodization was suggested by Adi Dahan, the curator of the "Bella Brisel: Waters from Waters" exhibition at the Tel Aviv Museum of Art (March - August 2025), in her preface to the exhibition catalogue.)

Brisel's paintings from the early 1950s are deeply infused with the spiritual heritage of the Jewish people and the religious traditions of her childhood. They are rich with symbols and motifs drawn from Jewish mysticism, Christianity, and Byzantine art – mythological themes that reflect the Christian visual culture surrounding her in Paris. The compositions are typically circular or symmetrical, featuring feminine figures alongside animals and celestial objects. These scenes depict a paradisiacal sexuality that existed before the Fall, separating Eve from nature and humans from their essence.

In the late 1950s and 1960s, Brisel's work underwent significant development following the couple's move to Formentera. During this period of consolidation and contraction, her paintings increasingly abandoned the symbolic motifs, animals, and landscapes that had previously defined her style. Instead, her canvases focused on figures engaged in dynamic relationships of dependency and protection.

A fluent visual language developed between the mid-1960s and Brisel's death in 1982. The circular movement that characterized her early paintings reemerged, while the gradual move away from mythology and traditional meanings paved the way for more introspective expressions.

== Exhibitions ==
Brisel's works appeared in numerous solo and group exhibitions worldwide; a selection is listed below. (Note: A full exhibition list is available in the catalogue (2025).)

=== Selected Solo Exhibitions ===
- 1951 La Maison des Beaux-Arts, Paris
- 1952 Galerie Creuze, Paris
- 1954 Galerie Breteau, Paris
- 1956 Tel Aviv Museum at Dizengoff House
- 1959 Kaplan Gallery, London
- 1961 Galerie M. Bernheim, Paris
- 1963 Iida Gallery, Tokyo
- 1963 Silman Gallery, New York
- 1965 Ewan Phillip Gallery, London
- 1965 Galerie Formentera (with Sioma Baram)
- 1966 Jean Tiroche Gallery, Jaffa
- 1969 Tel Aviv Museum at the Helena Rubinstein Pavilion
- 1970 Ramat Gan Museum at Beit Emanuel
- 1973 Talma Gallery, Tel Aviv
- 1977 Institute of Modern Art, Bangkok
- 1991 Yad LeBanim Museum, Petach Tikva (with Sioma Baram)
- 2014 Artists' House, Tel Aviv
- 2025 "Bella Brisel: Waters from Waters," Tel Aviv Museum of Art

=== Selected Group Exhibitions ===
- 1948 "Young Artists," Tel Aviv
- 1952 Young Painters' Salon, Paris
- 1952 Autumn Salon, Paris
- 1953 Paris Salon of Foreign Artists in France, Paris
- 1954 Exhibition of winners of the Art Critics Prize, Paris
- 1955 Exhibition of Israeli Artists in Paris, Galerie Zack, Paris
- 1955 Autumn Salon, Tokyo
- 1960 "Israeli Art Today," Paris
- 1971 "Israeli Art: Painting, Sculpture, Graphics," Tel Aviv Museum
- 2022 "Material Imagination," Tel Aviv Museum of Art

== Literature ==
1. Bella Brisel. Catalogue for the exhibition held at the Tel Aviv Museum, December 1956 / Preface by Eugene Kolb
2. Bella Brisel / Documentation réunie par Ivan Bettex. Series École de Paris. 1961
3. Bella Brisel: Peintures - eaux-fortes. Catalogue for the exhibition held at the Tel Aviv Museum, Beit Dizengoff, November-December 1969 / Preface by Haim Gamzu
4. Bella Brisel: Waters from Waters. Catalogue for the exhibition held at the Tel Aviv Museum of Art, March - August 2025 / Preface by Adi Dahan

== Sources ==
- B. Brisel in the Information Center for Israeli Art, the Israel Museum, Jerusalem
- B. Brisel in IMDb
