= Bella Jakubiak =

Australian self-taught cook (born 1983)

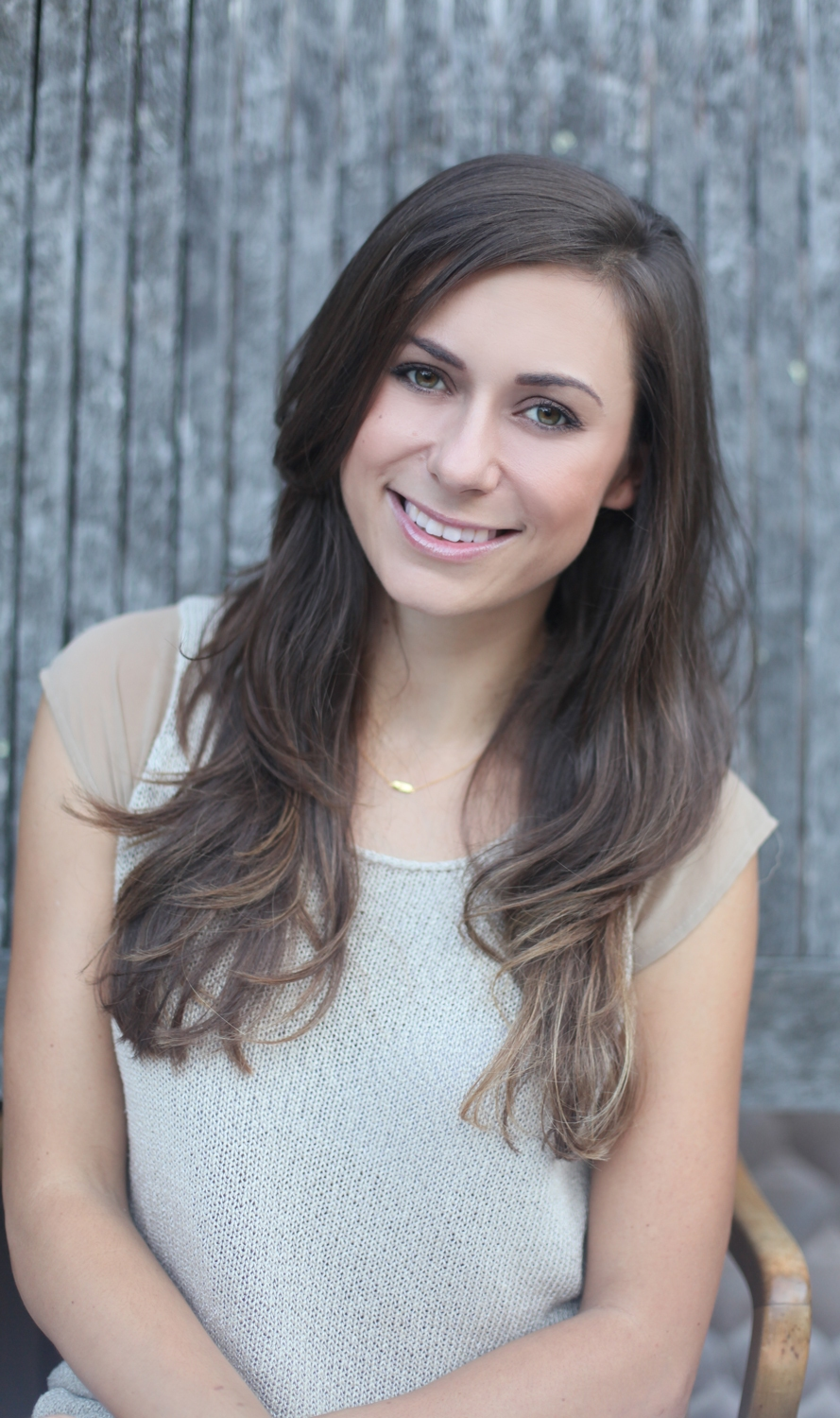
- Jakubiak in 2015
- Born: Isabella Jakubiak; 28 June 1983 (age 42); Sydney, New South Wales, Australia
- Occupation: Chef
- Spouse: James Webster (m. 2017)
- Relatives: Sammy Jakubiak (sister)
- Website: www.bellasfeast.com.au

Isabella Jakubiak (born 28 June 1983) is an Australian self-taught cook known for winning the 2011 series of reality television cooking programme, My Kitchen Rules with her sister Sammy.

== Personal life ==
Jakubiak was born in Sydney, Australia, and is of Polish heritage. Her heritage and family members working in the food service industry serve as a source of inspiration for her cooking.

== My Kitchen Rules ==
Bella Jakubiak and sister Sammy showcased both traditional and reinvented Polish cuisine as contestants on series 2 of My Kitchen Rules in 2011. The Sydney-based pair won the Grand Final broadcast on 13 April 2011, beating Victoria pair Kane and Lee.

== Current activities ==
Jakubiak appears in regular bi-weekly segment on Channel 7’s The Morning Show. She also hosts her own TV show alongside sister Sammy, Food For Life. Bella appears as a home cooking expert for LifeStyle Food.

In 2012 Jakubiak launched a Sydney based catering business, bellasfeast.

Bella has performed cooking demonstrations at Australian food shows, including the Good Food & Wine Show, since 2012.

In 2015 Bella Jakubiak co-founded a range of sauces under the brand name Saucy Sister.

Jakubiak has been ambassador to Passionfruit Australia in 2013, 2014 and 2015.

Since 2011, Bella has run a successful recipe blog.
