= Bella Tovey =

Holocaust survivor (1926–2019)

Bella Tovey (born Bella Jakubowicz, September 18, 1926 – July 14, 2019) was a Holocaust survivor who told her survival story in Europe, the United States, and Canada.

== Life before WWII ==
Tovey was the oldest child of four, born in Sosnowiec, Poland. Her father owned a knitting factory.

== Experience in WWII ==
In 1943, after four years of German occupation in Poland, Tovey was sent to northern Germany, to a labor camp. She was moved to the Bergen-Belsen concentration camp in December 1944. In April 1945, the camp was liberated, at which point she weighed 70 pounds and had lice.

== Life after WWII ==
In 1948, she married a fellow survivor, Henry Tovey.

Visiting her only other surviving sibling in 1959, Tovey pivoted from becoming an accountant to focusing on telling her story. She talked at schools across North America and Europe, as well as being a teacher within the Washington Hebrew Congregation.
