= Bella Horwitz =

Bohemian Yiddish writer

Bella Ḥazzan, née Horwitz, was an 18th-century Bohemian Yiddish writer.

She was the daughter of the martyr Be'er ben Hezekiah ha-Levi Horwitz and wife of Joseph ben Ḥayyim Ḥazzan, who died in Prague in 1713. In 1705 she published Geshikhte des hoyzes Dovid (Yiddish: געשיכטע דעס הויזעס דוד, lit. 'History of the Houses of David'). In conjunction with Rachel bat Nathan Porges (née Rausnitz), she edited a history, mostly legendary, of the Jews of Prague, entitled Eine shone geshikhte, zo izt geshehen, ehe nokh Yehudim tsu Prag gevohnt (Yiddish: איינע שאָנע געשיכטע, זאָ איזט געשעהען עהע נאך יהודים צו פראג געוואהנט, lit. 'One Beautiful Story'). She also wrote a teḥinah for the Ten Days of Repentance.
