= Bella Clara Ventura =

Colombian-Mexican director, screenwriter, producer, novelist and poet

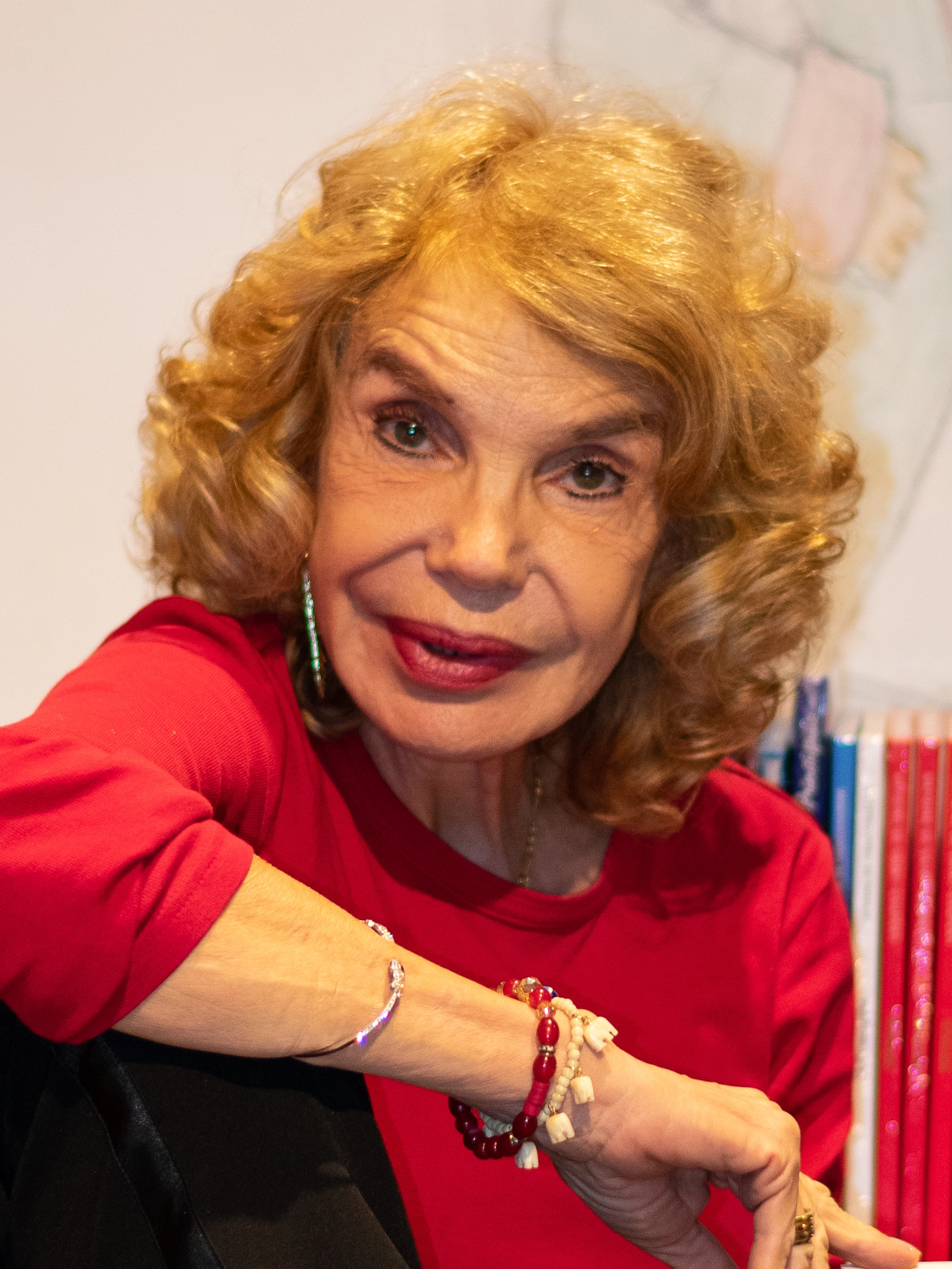
- Born: 1947 (age 78–79); Bogotá, Colombia
- Occupations: Film director screenwriter film producer novelist poet
- Years active: 1970s-present
- Website: bellaclaraventura.com

Bella Clara Ventura is a Colombian-Mexican director, screenwriter, producer, novelist, and poet.

== Early life ==
Ventura was born in 1947 in Bogota, Colombia to Jewish parents. She went on to study in Paris, France before returning to Colombia.

== Career ==
Ventura was a director, screenwriter and film producer for 10 years, receiving awards for her productions. She is considered one of the pioneers of cinema in the 70s in Colombia, along with Ciro Duran, Mario Ventura Mitrotti, and Joyce. For 25 years, she has devoted herself to literature.

She has been invited to literary events in the United States, Sweden, France, Mexico, Argentina, Uruguay, Chile, Peru, Ecuador, Spain, Puerto Rico, Mexico, India, Hungary, and Israel. He has also been invited to give lectures around the world, most recently in Leon, Guanajuato, Mexico in 2015. She is currently writing a new novel "Flight of Love" and new poems in conjunction with Ernesto Kahan.

== Published works ==
=== Poems ===
- "Afrodita en el alma", 2024
- "Antología de poetas latinoamericanos. Comarca sin fronteras II", 2003
- "Antología poética de Bella Clara Ventura", 2019
- "Bienhadadas", 2019
- "Carrousel d’émotions", 2022
- "Cœur en oasis", 2019
- "El milagro de la palabra", 2021
- "Hechizos de bosque", 2001
- "Liberté, hôtesse du coeur", 2012
- "Diáspora y asombro", 1995
- "La voz de la valija", 2024
- "A lo lejos" 2002
- "Huésped de la luz" 2004
- "Magias y retablos" 2004
- "Mujer de lunas y soles",
- "Niña de adentro" 2004
- "Atisbos de luz" 2007
- "Oasis de un despertar", 2008
- "Árboles de leche y miel", 2009
- "Eros en Canto" (Editorial Oveja Negra and Casa del Poeta Peruano 2010)
- "Orfandades",
- "Palpitations",
- "Passion en Arc-en-ciel", 2022
- "Paz sicaria de la lágrima" (Editorial Oveja Negra and Alejo editores Perú 2011)
- "Semence de l’absence",2016
- "Tsunami de feu", 2024
- "Cinquante-cinq jours sans toi", Editions du Cygne, 2015
- Beings of Light in as new process about to be released in Madrid poems.

=== Novels ===
- África en la sangre (Lord Byron Editions 2014), with the Editorial Mundibook - Madrid;.
- Almamocha, 1993.
- Almas de papel, 2022
- Corazón en telaraña, 2018
- Lo que la Vida Quiera, 2000.
- El Viento de la Sombra, 2003.
  - recognized as a best seller in the Miami Herald
- Armando fuego, 2014.
- La voz de la pasión, 2012
- La sed del tiempo, 2024
- Las tres gracias, 2023
- Nace sana, 2024
- El amor en los tiempos del coronavirus, 2020.
- Contigo aprendí, 2007 Editores Spain Lord Byron
- Trees of Milk and Honey (2009)
- Rehén de la memoria (novel) Editorial Oveja Negra, December. 2009
- La voz de la violencia (editorial Black Sheep, and Alejo Editions Peru novel 2011)
- Canadá para siempre, 2015.
- Un hombre milenario, 2022

=== Biography ===
- Escritura de luz: Vida y obra de Bella Clara Ventura, 2021

== Positions ==
- Vice President of Organización Mundial de Trovadores- O.M.T.- Israel.
- Ambassador of the peace organization based in Geneva.
- Embrace group representative Uruguay Brazil.
- Former ambassador of Poets of the World.
- IFLAC former ambassador to Colombia (Agency peace in art and literature).
- Delegate of the Society of French Poets.
- Honorary president of the Hispano-American Union of Letters (UHE).
- Representative of the House of Peruvian Poets.
- Vocal Pen Colombia.
- Chosen as one of the top 50 women of Culture (Saint Thomas Aquinas University, Bogotá) 2008.

== Awards ==
- First Poem Award Guadalquivir, (Spain, 2011)
- First prize El Rosal, (mother poem, University of Miami, 2011)
- First place in Dios Mío Contest, (Israel, 2011).
- First prize in Wings of Poetry, (Chile, 2012).
- Rosetta Poetry Prize, (Turkey, 2013).
- Honorary Doctorate of the World Academy of Culture and Arts (USA, 2011)
- And a special thanks to the work (Israel, 2015).
