= Bella Zur =

Israeli Paralympic competitor

Personal information
- Native name: בלה צור
- Born: 7 December 1952 (age 73) Petah Tikva, Israel

Sport
- Country: Israel
- Sport: Para-athletics; Para swimming Wheelchair fencing
- Disability: Polio
Medal record
Event / 1st / 2nd / 3rd; Paralympic Games / 1 / 0 / 1
Para swimming
Representing Israel
Paralympic Games
Gold medal – first place	1976 Toronto	25m backstroke 2
Bronze medal – third place	1976 Toronto	25m freestyle 2

Bella Zur (née Weinstock, Hebrew: בלה צור; born 7 December 1952) is a former Israeli Paralympic athlete, wheelchair fencer and para swimmer. She later served as city councilor in Ra'anana from 2003 to 2013.

== Sports career ==
Zur contracted polio at a young age and is paraplegic. She began practicing sports at the Israel Sports Center for the Disabled.

She took part in the 1968 Summer Paralympics and 1976 Summer Paralympics, competing in swimming (1968 and 1976), wheelchair fencing (1968) and athletics (1976). She ranked sixth in women's novices foil. Her top achievements were gold and bronze medals as a para swimmer at the 1976 Games.

Zur is a veteran in wheelchair dancing and in 2001 joined Vertigo dance company.

== Professional career ==
In 1978 Zur completed her social work studies at Bar Ilan University. She was a social worker for the municipality of Petah Tikva until 1985 and later worked at Loewenstein Rehabilitation Hospital (1986-1995) and a geriatric hospital in Ra'anana (1995-2002). In 2000 she completed a master's degree in social work.

From 2003 to 2013 Zur was a member of Ra'anana city council. Among her roles as city councilor she was in charge of the city's welfare portfolio and later served as chairwoman of the accessibility committee.

Zur was a member of the advisory committee to the commissioner for equal rights for people with disabilities at the Ministry of Justice.

== Personal life ==
Zur is married to paralympian Ofer Zur who participated in the Paralympic Games from 1976 to 1988. They have four children, including triplets.

She lectures on disability and accessibility, as well as volunteering at Beit Issie Shapiro for people with special needs.

Zur was named a distinguished citizen of Ra'anana for 2022. She was previously awarded with the "Equality Award" for 2003 by the commissioner for equal rights for people with disabilities at the Ministry of Justice and the "Struggle Award" for 2006 by Beit Issie Shapiro.
