= Bella Ouellette =

Canadian actress

- Born: Agnes Martine Ouellette; 19 October 1886; Montreal, Quebec, Canada
- Died: 5 December 1945 (aged 59); Montreal, Quebec, Canada
- Occupation: Actor

Agnes Martine "Bella" Ouellette (19 October 1886 – 5 December 1945) was a Canadian Québécoise actor who worked mainly in theatre and radio in Montreal, Quebec, Canada.

== Biography ==
Bella Ouellette made her debut acting performance at the age of thirteen alongside Louis Labelle and Blanche de La Sablonnière, famous artists at the time. In 1902 she made her professional debut in the play "La Passion" directed by Julien Daoust at the Monument-National theatre in Montreal.

Subsequently, Ouellette had a successful career on the stages of Montreal theatres from the early 1900s until the late 1930s. She was the leading actress of the troupe of Julien Daoust. She married Daoust on 14 February 1906 in Ste-Brigide, Montreal.

Ouellette separated from Julien Daoust in 1919 and created her own theatre troupe in 1922 with Jeanne Demons, the Ouellette-Demons Troupe. By the 1920s she was considered one of the grande dammes of Quebec theatre.

In the early 1930s she was active in the theatre troupe of Fred Barry which was paired with the comedian Albert Duquesne. The Barry-Duquesne Troupe took up in Montreal's Chanteclerc cinema, which would later be known as the Stella Theatre. The troupe included Marthe Thiéry, Antoine Godeau, Pierre Durand, Mimi d'Estée, Henry Deyglun, Jeanne Demons and Gaston Dauriac. The Barry-Duquesne Troupe, accompanied by the Alouette Quatuor (transl. the Four Larks), embarked for Paris in 1937 to perform Henry Deyglun's Vers la terre canadienne (transl. Towards Canadian Soil). It was the first occasion for a Québécoise troupe to stage a Canadian play in France.

Faced with the slump in theatre in Montreal in the later 1930s, Ouellette turned to radio and completed her career in early soap operas such as Claude-Henri Grignon's Un homme et son péché (transl. A Man and His Sin).

Ouellette married Fred Barry in 1944.

The archival fonds (collection of works) of Fred Barry and Bella Ouellette are preserved in the Montreal archives centre of the Bibliothèque et Archives nationales du Québec (BAnQ).

== Sources ==
- Bergeon, Raymonde; Ouellette, Marcelle (1986). Radio-Canada 1936–1986. Voix, visages et légendes [Radio-Canada 1936–1986. Voices, Faces and Legends] (in French). Les Entreprises Radio-Canada.
- Dictionnaire des artistes du théâtre québécois [Dictionary of artists of Quebec theatre] (in French). Cahier de théâtre Jeu. 2008. p. 424. ISBN 978-2-7644-0621-2.
- 101 années de vedettariat au Québec [101 years of stardom in Quebec]. Outremont, Éditions du Trécarré. 2000. p. 160. ISBN 2-89249-977-1.
- Authority control. "Fichier d'autorité international virtuel" [Virtual International Authority File] (in French). Online Computer Library Center, Incorporated.
