= DiBella =

DiBella may refer to:

- DiBella Winery, winery in Woolwich Township in Gloucester County, New Jersey
- DiBella's, winery in Woolwich Township in Gloucester County, New Jersey

== See also ==
- Di Bella, a list of people with the surname Di Bella or DiBella
