= Isabel =

- Pronunciation: /ˈɪzəbɛl/ Brazilian Portuguese: [izaˈbɛw]
- Gender: Female

Origin
- Origin: Spanish
- Region of origin: Europe

Other names
- Related names: Elisheba, Elisabel, Isabella, Isabelle, Izabela, Isobel, Isobelle, Ishbel, Iseabail, Izabela, Ysabeau, Elizabeth, Ysabelle

Isabel is a female name of Spanish origin. It originates as the medieval Spanish form of Elisabeth. Arising in the 12th century, it became popular in England in the 13th century following the marriage of Isabella of Angoulême to the king of England. Variant forms and spellings include Isabella, Ysabelle, Isobel, and Isobelle.

== Etymology ==
This set of names is a Spanish variant of the Hebrew name Elisheba through Latin and Greek represented in English and other European languages as Elisabeth. These names are derived from the Latin and Greek renderings of the Hebrew name based on both etymological and contextual evidence (the use of Isabel as a translation of Elizabeth). The variant form originated through the loss of the first syllable through rebracketing and the replacement of final /t/ with /l/ (as /t/ does not appear word-finally in standard Spanish). Elisabeth was understood in Spain as a name with the masculine definite article el "the", that is to say *El Isabeth, from it, the short form *Isabeth where the final -el was substituted to -eth, both for aesthetical reasons or feminization, or the entire syllable -bel was substituted to -beth, by analogy with bella "pretty, beautiful".

== Notable individuals ==
=== People ===
- Isabel I (1451–1504), Queen of Castile and Léon (1474–1504), Queen consort of Aragon (1479–1504)
- Isabel, Princess Imperial of Brazil (1846–1921)
- Isabel, Waikeri leader (~1500-1558)
- Isabel Aboy, Spanish actress
- Isabel Allende, Chilean author and niece of Salvador Allende
- Isabel Barrows, American stenographer
- Isabel Baumann, Swiss bobsledder
- Isabel Bayrakdarian, Canadian-Armenian lyric soprano
- Isabel of Beaumont, English noblewoman
- Isabel Alfonsa of Bourbon-Two Sicilies, Infanta of Spain and Countess Zamoyska
- Isabel Graham Bryce, British public servant
- Isabel of Cambridge, English noblewoman and Countess of Essex
- Isabel Carrasco, Spanish politician
- Isabel Casimiro, Mozambican sociologist
- Isabel Cleghorn, British educationist and suffragist
- Isabel of Coimbra, Portuguese infanta and Queen of Portugal
- Isabel Cowe, Scottish suffragist
- Isabel Maria de Alcântara, Brazilian noblewoman and Duchess of Goiás
- Isabel de Clare, Anglo-Norman noblewoman and 4th Countess of Pembroke
- Isabel de Castro, Portuguese actress
- Isabel de Forz, English noblewoman and 8th Countess of Devon
- Isabel de Herédia, Portuguese businesswoman and Duchess of Braganza
- Isabel de Santa Rita Vás, Indian author, playwright, theatre director and teacher
- Isabel Pinto de Vidal, Uruguayan feminist lawyer and politician
- Isabel de Villena, Aragonese writer of religious treaties
- Isabel de Warenne, English noblewoman and Countess of Arundel
- Isabel de Warenne, English noblewoman and Countess of Surrey
- Isabel de Madariaga, British historian
- Isabel del Puerto, Mexican-American actress
- Isabel Derungs, Swiss snowboarder
- Isabel Dias also known as Bartira among other names, Brazilian and Amerindian figure
- Isabel dos Santos, Angolan businesswoman
- Isabel Elizabeth Francis (1991–2022), Singaporean murder victim
- Isabel Escobar, Brazilian-American environmental engineer
- Isabel Fillardis, Brazilian actress
- Isabel Godin des Odonais, traveler in the Amazon Basin
- Isabel Granada, Filipino actress
- Isabel Ge Mahe, Chinese businesswoman
- Isabel Gemio, Spanish television presenter
- Isabel Getty, American singer-songwriter
- Isabel Hardman, British journalist
- Isabel Hardwich, British electrical engineer
- Isabel Hodgson, Australian soccer player
- Isabel Ingoldisthorpe (1441–1476), English noblewoman
- Isabel Jesus (born 1970), Portuguese rower
- Isabel Jean Jones, English-born South African consumer journalist
- Isabel Lamberti, Dutch film director
- Isabel Stevens Lathrop, American singer
- Isabel Güell i López, Spanish composer, pianist, organist
- Isabel Leonard, American opera singer
- Isabel Wiseler-Santos Lima, Portuguese-born Luxembourgish politician
- Isabel Mendes Lopes (born 1982), Portuguese politician
- Isabel Lucas, Australian actress and model
- Isabel Macedo, Argentine actress
- Isabel Marant, French fashion designer
- Isabel May, American actress
- Isabel McCorkindale, Australian temperance activist
- Isabel Briggs Myers, American writer who co-created the Myers–Briggs Type Indicator (MBTI) test
- Isabel Neville, English noblewoman and Duchess of Clarence
- Lady Isabel Manners (1918–2008), British socialite
- Isabel Newstead (1955–2007), British paralympic athlete
- Isabel Nicholas, British painter and costume designer
- Isabel Nkavadeka, Mozambican politician
- Isabel Nolan, Irish artist
- Isabel Oli, Filipino actress
- Isabel Luberza Oppenheimer (1901–1974), Puerto Rican brothel owner
- Isabel Ordaz, Spanish actress
- Isabel Pantoja, Spanish singer
- Isabel Parra, Chilean singer-songwriter
- Isabel Weld Perkins, American heiress, author, and society hostess
- Isabel Perón, President of Argentina (1974–1976) and third wife of Juan Perón
- Isabel Pires (born 1990), Portuguese politician
- Isabel of Portugal, Lady of Viseu and natural daughter of King Ferdinand I of Portugal
- Isabel Ribeiro (born 1955), Portuguese robotics engineer
- Isabel Abraham Ross (1885–1964), British teacher, suffragist, pacifist and biographer
- Isabel Ruth, Portuguese actress
- Isabel Sanford, American actress
- Isabel Seymour, British suffragette and politician
- Isabel Giberne Sieveking (1857–1936), British suffragette, historian and writer
- Isabel Calvimontes (1790–1855), a Bolivian-born Argentine patriot; one of the Patricias Argentinas
- Isabel Toledo (1961–2019), Cuban-American fashion designer
- Isabel Waidner, German-British writer and cultural theorist
- Isabel Wilkerson, American journalist
- Isabel Bras Williamson (fl. 1430 – 1493), Scottish merchant
- Isabel Wolff, British novelist
- Isabel Zapata (born 1984), Mexican writer, editor, poet and translator

== Fictional characters ==
- Isabel Archer, the heroine of Henry James's novel The Portrait of a Lady
- Isabel Fernandez, character in the book Refugee
- Isabel Hoffman, American Girl character
- Isabel Maru / Doctor Poison, character in Wonder Woman (2017)
- Isabel Cristina "ChaCha" Ramirez from Primos, a Disney cartoon

== See also ==
- Isabel (disambiguation)
- Isabela (disambiguation)
- Isabella (disambiguation)
