= Isabelle (disambiguation) =

Isabelle is a French feminine given name

Isabelle may also refer to:

== People known by mononym ==
- Isabelle (singer) (born 1981), Dominican singer
- Isabelle of Bavaria (1370–1435), wife of King Charles VI of France
- Isabelle of England (1295–1358), wife of Edward II of England and regent of England from 1327 to 1330
- Saint Isabelle of France (1225–1270)
- Isabelle of Luxembourg (1247–1298), countess consort of Flanders and marquis consort of Namur
- Isabelle of Orléans (disambiguation)
- Princess Isabelle (disambiguation)
- Queen Isabelle (disambiguation)

=== Fictional characters ===
- Isabelle (Animal Crossing), a character in the Animal Crossing video game series
- Isabelle (comics), a Belgian comic series
- Isabelle (Marvel Comics), a character in Marvel Comics

== Places ==
- Isabelle Peak, a peak on the Continental Divide in the Canadian Rockies
- Isabelle, Wisconsin, United States, a town
- Lake Isabelle, a lake in Minnesota, United States

== Arts, entertainment, media ==
- Isabelle (2018 film), a Canadian-American horror film
- Isabelle (2011 film), a Dutch psychological thriller film
- Isabelle (novella), a 1911 novella by André Gide
- Isabelle (sculpture), a sculpture by Julian Voss-Andreae

== Other ==
- ISABELLE, a partially-built particle accelerator at Brookhaven National Laboratory in Upton, New York, cancelled in July 1983
- Isabelle (proof assistant), an interactive theorem-proving framework
- MS Isabelle X, a cruiseferry
- Isabelle's ghost bat (Diclidurus isabellus), a bat species from South America

== See also ==
- Isabel (disambiguation)
- Isabella (disambiguation)
