= Isobel =

- Gender: Female

Origin
- Meaning: God's promise; pledge to god

Other names
- Related names: Isabel, Isabeau, Isabella, Isabelle, Izabela, Elizabeth

Isobel Lamont “Belle” Stewart Bryan (1847-1910)

Isobel is the Scottish form of the female given name Isabel. It originates from the medieval form of the name Elisabeth.

== People named Isobel ==
- Isobel of Huntingdon (1199–1251), Scottish royalty
- Isobel Baillie (1895–1983), Scottish operatic soprano
- Isobel Barnett (1918–1980), British radio and television personality
- Isobel Borlase (born 2004), Australian basketball player
- Isobel Buchanan (born 1954), Scottish operatic soprano
- Isobel Campbell (born 1976), Scottish singer, formerly with Belle and Sebastian
- Isobel Lilian Gloag (1865–1917), English painter
- Isobel Gowdie, Scottish woman who was tried for witchcraft in 1662
- Isobel Elsom (1893–1981), English actress
- Isobel Joyce (born 1983), Irish cricketer
- Isobel Loutit (1909–2009), Canadian statistician
- Isobel Miller Kuhn (1901–1957), Canadian missionary
- Isobel Lennart (1915–1971), American screenwriter and playwright
- Isobel Rae (1860–1940), known as Iso Rae, Australian impressionist painter
- Isobel Redmond (born 1953), Australian politician
- Isobel Waller-Bridge (born 1984), British composer
- Isobel Yeung (born 1986), British journalist

== Fictional characters named Isobel ==
- Isobel "Izzie" Stevens, a character from the American medical drama Grey's Anatomy
- Isobel Crawley, a character from the British period drama Downton Abbey
- Isobel Flemming, a character from The Vampire Diaries
