= Izabal =

Izabal may be:

- Izabal Department, one of the 22 departments of Guatemala
  - Lake Izabal
  - Izabal (town)
  - Roman Catholic Vicariate Apostolic of Izabal
  - Izabal JC, football club

== See also ==
- Isabel
- Isabelle
