= Izabella =

Izabella is a Polish feminine given name.

== Notable people ==
- Izabella Alvarez (b. 2004), American actress
- Izabella Antonowicz (b. 1942), Polish canoeist
- Izabella Arazova (b. 1936), Armenian composer
- Izabella Camargo (b. 1981), Brazilian journalist
- Izabella Chiappini (b. 1995), Brazilian-Italian water poloist
- Izabella Cywińska (b. 1935; d. 2023), Former Minister of Culture and National Heritage of Poland
- Izabella Elżbieta Czartoryska (b. 1832; d. 1899), Polish noblewoman and artist
- Izabella Godlewska (b. 1931; d. 2018), Polish painter and sculptor
- Izabella Kuliffay (b. 1863; d. 1945), Hungarian pianist and composer
- Izabella Łaba (b. 1966), Canadian mathematician and professor
- Izabella Miko (b. 1981), Polish actress and dancer
- Izabella Pawelczynska (b. 1904; d. 1994), Polish stenographer
- Izabella Poniatowska (b. 1730; d. 1808); Member of the Poniatowski
- Izabella Scorupco (b. 1970), Polish actress and singer
- Izabella Sierakowska (b. 1946; d. 2021), Former Member of the Sejm of the Republic of Poland
- Izabella St. James (b. 1975), American former model
- Izabella Tabarovsky (b. 1970), Soviet-born writer
- Izabella Teixeira (b. 1961), Former Minister of the Environment and Climate Change of Brazil
- Izabella Yaylyan (b. 1995), Armenian weightlifter
- Izabella Yurieva (b. 1899; d. 2000), Russian singer
- Izabella Zielińska (b. 1910; d. 2017), Polish pianist and pedagogue

== See also ==
- Isabella, given name
- Izabella, name
