= Izabela (name) =

Izabela is a feminine given name. Notable people with this name include:

- Izabela Abramowicz (1889–1973), Polish mathematician
- Izabela Bełcik (born 1980), Polish volleyball player
- Izabela Bodnar (born 1975), Polish politician
- Izabela Burczyk (born 1972), Polish swimmer
- Izabela Campos (born 1981), Brazilian Paralympic athlete
- Izabela Czartoryska (1746–1835), Polish princess
- Izabela Dragneva (born 1971), Bulgarian weightlifter
- Izabela Dylewska (born 1968), Polish canoeist
- Izabela Dąbrowska (born 1966), Polish actress and comedian
- Izabela Dłużyk (born 1989), Polish nature sound recordist
- Izabela Elżbieta Morsztyn (1671–1756), Polish noblewoman
- Izabela Filipiak (born 1961), Polish writer
- Izabela Grabowska (aristocrat) (1776–1858), Polish noblewoman
- Izabela Grabowska (sociologist), Polish sociologist and economist
- Izabela Hannah, Polish dancer
- Izabela Jaruga-Nowacka (1950–2010), Polish politician
- Izabela Kloc (born 1963), Polish politician
- Izabela Kowalińska (born 1985), Polish volleyball player
- Izabela Križaj (born 2000), Slovenian footballer
- Izabela Kuna (born 1970), Polish actress
- Izabela Lemańczyk (born 1990), Polish volleyball player
- Izabela Leszczyna (born 1962), Polish official
- Izabela Lojna (born 1992), Croatian football midfielder
- Izabela Lupulesku, Serbian table tennis player
- Izabela Lăcătuș (born 1976), Romanian gymnast
- Izabela Marcisz (born 2000), Polish cross-country skier
- Izabela Maria Furtado Kestler (1959–2009), Brazilian professor of German studies
- Izabela Maria Lubomirska (1808–1890), Polish noblewoman
- Izabela Matusz (born 1974), Polish diplomat
- Izabela Mrzygłocka (1959–2024), Polish politician
- Izabela Naydenova, Bulgarian holography researcher
- Izabela Paszkiewicz (born 1988), Polish long-distance runner
- Izabela Prudzienica (born 1985), Polish handball player
- Izabela Płaneta-Małecka (1930–2016), Polish physician and politician
- Izabela Sadoveanu-Evan (1870–1941), Romanian activist and writer
- Izabela Stahelin (born 1992), Brazilian footballer
- Izabela Textorisová (1866–1949), Slovak botanist
- Izabela Tomaszewska (1955–2010), Polish archaeologist
- Izabela Trojanowska (born 1955), Polish singer and film actress
- Izabela Vidovic (born 2001), American actress
- Izabela Wagner (born 1964), sociologist
- Izabela Yankova (born 2004), Bulgarian downhill mountain biker
- Izabela Zatorska (born 1962), Polish mountain runner
- Izabela Zubko (born 1974), Polish poet
- Izabela da Silva (born 1995), Brazilian discus thrower

== See also ==
- Isabella (given name)
