= Isabelle =

Isabelle is a feminine given name. Notable people with the name include:

== People ==
- Isabelle of Luxembourg (1247–1298), a daughter of Henry V of Luxembourg and his wife Margaret of Bar
- Isabelle of Orléans (disambiguation)
- Princess Isabelle (disambiguation)
- Isabelle Abiera (born 1992), a Filipina actress and model
- Isabelle Adjani (born 1955), a French film actress and singer
- Isabelle Antena, a French singer
- Isabelle Arnould (born 1970), a Belgian female freestyle swimmer
- Isabelle Aubret (born 1938), a French singer
- Isabelle Autissier (born 1956), a French sailor, navigator, writer and broadcaster
- Isabelle Amyes (born 1950), an English actress
- Isabelle Bean (1862 – 1939), an Australian nurse, theosophist and feminist
- Isabelle Blais, a Canadian actress and musician
- Isabelle Blanc (born 1975), a French snowboarder and Olympic champion
- Isabelle Boulay (born 1972), a francophone Canadian pop singer
- Isabelle Boulogne (born 1971), a French sprint canoer
- Isabelle Brasseur (born 1970), a Canadian figure skater
- Isabelle Breitman (born 1959), a French actress and director
- Isabelle von Bueltzingsloewen (born 1964), a French academic and historian
- Isabelle Buret, a French telecommunications and space science engineer
- Isabelle Le Callennec (born 1966), French politician
- Isabelle Rauch (born 1968), French politician
- Isabelle Carbonell, a Belgio-Uruguayan documentary photographer and filmmaker
- Isabelle Caro, a French model suffering from severe anorexia nervosa
- Isabelle Carré (born 1971), a French actress
- Isabelle Champmoreau (born 1974), a New Caledonian politician
- Isabelle Charest (born 1971), a Canadian short track speed skater
- Isabelle Chartrand (born 1978), a Canadian ice hockey player
- Isabelle Cheng (born 1970), an intelligence agent
- Isabelle Collin Dufresne (aka Ultra Violet, 1935–2014), a French-American artist
- Isabelle Corey (1939–2011), a French film actress
- Isabelle Coutant-Peyre (born 1952), a French lawyer
- Isabelle Daniels (1937–2017), an American athlete, who mainly competed in the 100 metres
- Isabelle de Charrière (1740–1805), a Dutch-born writer of the Enlightenment
- Isabelle de Craon (c.1212–??), a French noblewoman
- Isabelle Debré (born 1957), a member of the Senate of France
- Isabelle Delobel (born 1978), a French figure skater
- Isabelle Delorme (1900–1991), a Canadian composer, pianist and music educator
- Isabelle de Meulan (c. 1148 – 1220), a French noblewoman
- Isabelle Demongeot (born 1966), a former French professional tennis player
- Isabelle de Montolieu (1751–1832), a Swiss novelist and translator
- Isabelle Despres, a French slalom canoer
- Isabelle Devaluez (born 1966), a French discus thrower
- Isabelle Diks (born 1965), a Dutch GreenLeft politician
- Isabelle Dinoire (born 1967), the first person to undergo a partial face transplant
- Isabelle Duchesnay (born 1963), an ice dancer who competed for both Canada and France
- Isabelle Durant (born 1954), a Belgian politician, member of the Ecolo party
- Isabelle Eberhardt (1877–1904), a Swiss-Algerian explorer and writer
- Isabelle Farah (born 1986), English comedian, presenter, actress and writer
- Isabelle Ferron (born 1967), an actress in both film and stage
- Isabelle Fijalkowski (born 1972), a French basketball player
- Isabelle Flory, a French violinist
- Isabelle Jane Foulkes (1970–2001), Anglo-Welsh artist, textile designer and disability campaigner
- Isabelle Fuhrman (born 1997), an American teen actress
- Isabelle Gatti de Gamond (1839–1905), an Italo-Belgian educationalist, feminist and politician
- Isabelle Gaudeuille (born 1954), Central African Republic lawyer and politician
- Isabelle Goldenson (1920–2005), American lobbyist and philanthropist
- Isabelle Guyon (born 1961), French-born researcher in machine learning
- Isabelle Haak (born 1999), Swedish volleyball player
- Isabelle Bowen Henderson (1899–1969), American painter and floriculturist
- Isabelle Holland (1920–2002), an author of children and adult fiction books
- Isabelle Huppert (born 1953), a French actress
- Isabelle Keith (1898–1979), an American actress
- Isabelle Kridluar (1954–2018), Inuk artist who lived by Repulse Bay, Nunavut, Canada
- Isabelle LaMal (1886–1952), an American film actress
- Isabelle Laville (died 1987), French murder victim
- Isabelle Lendl (born 1991), an American amateur golfer
- Isabelle Li, Singaporean table tennis player
- Isabelle Liberman (1918–1990), an American psychologist
- Isabelle Lucas (1927–1997), a Canadian-born British actress and singer
- Isabelle Mancini (born 1967), a French cross country skier
- Isabelle Mercier (born 1975), a Canadian professional poker player
- Isabelle E. Merry (1907–2000), Australian Congregational minister and chaplain
- Isabelle Mir (born 1949), a French former Alpine skier
- Isabelle Morneau (born 1976), a defender on the Canada women's national soccer team
- Isabelle Mouthon-Michellys (born 1966), a French athlete
- Isabelle Nanty (born 1962), a French actress and film director
- Isabelle Nylander (born 1990), a Swedish figure skater
- Isabelle Olivieri (1957–2016), French biologist, specialising in evolutionary sciences, genetics and population biology
- Isabelle Pasco (born 1966), a French actress and model
- Isabelle Pasquet (born 1962), member of the Senate of France
- Isabelle Pearson (born 1981), Canadian judoka
- Isabelle Peretz, a Professor of Psychology at the University of Montreal
- Isabelle Périgault (born 1971), French politician
- Isabelle Pieman (born 1983), Belgian figure skater
- Isabelle Pinson (1769–1855), French genre painter and portraitist
- Isabelle Rampling (born 1985), Canadian synchronized swimmer
- Isabelle Rezazadeh, also known as Rezz, a Canadian DJ and record producer
- Isabelle Romée (1377–1458), the mother of Joan of Arc
- Isabelle Sadoyan (1928–2017), French actress
- Isabelle Sandy (1884–1975), French poet and writer
- Isabelle Schad (born 1970), German dancer and choreographer
- Isabelle Severino (born 1980), French gymnast and actress
- Isabelle Simonis (born 1967), Belgian politician from the Socialist Party
- Isabelle Stengers (born 1949), Belgian philosopher and the daughter of the historian Jean Stengers
- Isabelle Stoehr (born 1979), French professional squash player
- Isabelle Stone (1868–1944), American physicist
- Isabelle Story (1887–1970), American writer and editor
- Isabelle Thompson (1891–1946), Hawaiian-American teacher and politician
- Isabelle Turcotte Baird (born 1970), Canadian athlete
- Isabelle Urquhart (1865–1907), American stage actress
- Isabelle Vasseur (born 1959), member of the National Assembly of France
- Isabelle Valentin (born 1962), French politician
- Isabelle Vandre (born 1989), German politician
- Isabelle Vengerova (1877–1956), a Russian-born American pianist and music teacher
- Isabelle Wendling (born 1971), a French handball player
- Isabelle Wéry, a Belgian actress and writer
- Isabelle Westbury (born 1990), an English cricketer
- Isabelle White (1894–1972), a British diver
- Isabelle Yacoubou (born 1986), French, of Bénin origin, professional basketball player

=== Fictional characters ===
- Isabelle (Animal Crossing), an anthropomorphic dog character who was introduced as the mayor's assistant in the Nintendo 3DS game title Animal Crossing: New Leaf
- Isabelle (comics), a Belgian comic book series
- Isabelle Lightwood, character in The Mortal Instruments series and Shadowhunters TV series based on the novel
- Isabelle Tyler, a character on the USA Network science fiction television series The 4400
