= Zabelle =

Zabelle is a female given name and surname of Armenian origin. It is derived from Zabel, itself a variation of Isabella. Notable people with the name include:

== Given name ==
- Zabelle C. Boyajian (1873–1957), Armenian painter and writer
- Zabelle Panosian (1891–1986), Armenian-American soprano

== Last name ==
- Flora Zabelle Hitchcock (née Flora Zabelle; 1880–1968), Turkish Broadway actress of Armenian descent

== See also ==
- Zabelle (novel), 1997 novel by Nancy Kricorian about the Armenian genocide
- Belle (given name)
