= Isabel Jones =

Isabel Jones may refer to:

- Isabel Jean Jones (?–2008), English-born South African consumer journalist
- Isabel Jones (bowls) (born 1955), Welsh lawn bowls player
