= Zubko =

Zubko (Ukrainian: Зубко́) is a Ukrainian surname. Notable people with the surname include:

- Denis Zubko (born 1974), Russian footballer
- Ihor Zubko (born 1991), Ukrainian footballer
- Izabela Zubko (born 1974), Polish poet
- Olena Zubko (born 1953), Ukrainian rower
