= George Neville, Duke of Bedford =

English noble

George Neville
- Duke of Bedford
- Born: 22 February 1465
- Died: 4 May 1483 (aged 18)
- Noble family: Neville
- Father: John Neville, 1st Marquess of Montagu
- Mother: Isabel Ingoldisthorpe

George Neville, Duke of Bedford (22 February 1465 – 4 May 1483) was an English nobleman, a scion of the House of Neville. At birth, he was likely heir to great wealth, but due to the political failure of his father and uncle, he inherited very little.

He was the son of John Neville, Earl of Northumberland and a nephew of Richard Neville, 16th Earl of Warwick. George's mother was Isabel Ingoldisthorpe, daughter and heiress of Sir Edmund Ingoldsthorpe and Joan Tiptoft.

At birth, George was the likely or possible heir to considerable property. Most definite were the property of his father's earldom, his mother's Ingoldsthorpe estates, and the more modest jointure of his parents. The latter two were by themselves sufficient to support a baron. He was also heir presumptive (after his father) to the Neville estates of his uncle Warwick. These were entailed to heirs male and the earl had only daughters. Finally, George was likely to inherit (after his mother and grandmother) a third share of the Tiptoft property held by his childless great-uncle, John Tiptoft, 1st Earl of Worcester, whose sister and heiress Joan was George's maternal grandmother. These inheritances altogether would yield over £4,000 a year, comparable to the £4,500 annual income of the Duke of Clarence. When George was born, it was proposed that he should be betrothed to Anne Holland, the Duchess of Exeter's daughter. Had this happened, it is argued that he would have become the greatest nobleman of his generation.

George Neville was made Duke of Bedford in 1470, as the intended husband of Elizabeth of York, to whom he had been betrothed since 1469 as part of King Edward IV's strategy to control Warwick and Clarence. The title had lain unused since John of Lancaster, Duke of Bedford died on 14 September 1435, leaving no legitimate children. However, his father and his uncle Warwick rebelled against Edward IV the following year and were slain in battle, causing the proposed marriage to be scrapped. An act of attainder was never passed against them, but George received no inheritance from them or from his maternal ancestors. An act of Parliament in 1471 gave the Neville inheritance in the north of England to Richard, Duke of Gloucester, prior to his marriage to one of Warwick's daughters. George had a half-interest in the estates of his maternal grandfather, Sir Edmund Ingoldsthorpe, and his maternal grandmother, Joan Tiptoft.

Shortly before he came of age in 1478 he was denied the title of duke by an act of Parliament, ostensibly for lack of money to "support the name, estate or dignity" of a duke. The title was subsequently given to the infant George of York, the third son of Edward IV. He died in 1483 of natural causes.

== Ancestry ==
Ancestors of George Neville, Duke of Bedford

8. Ralph Neville, 1st Earl of Westmorland
4. Richard Neville, 5th Earl of Salisbury
9. Joan Beaufort
2. John Neville, 1st Marquess of Montagu
10. Thomas Montagu, 4th Earl of Salisbury
5. Alice Montagu, 5th Countess of Salisbury
11. Eleanor Holland
1. George Neville, Duke of Bedford
12. Thomas Ingoldisthorpe Esq
6. Sir Edmund Ingoldisthorpe
13. Margaret de la Pole
3. Isabel Ingoldisthorpe
14. John Tiptoft, 1st Baron Tiptoft
7. Joan Tiptoft
15. Joyce Charlton
