= Isabelle E. Merry =

Australian congregational minister and chaplain (1907–2002)

Isabelle E. Merry OBE
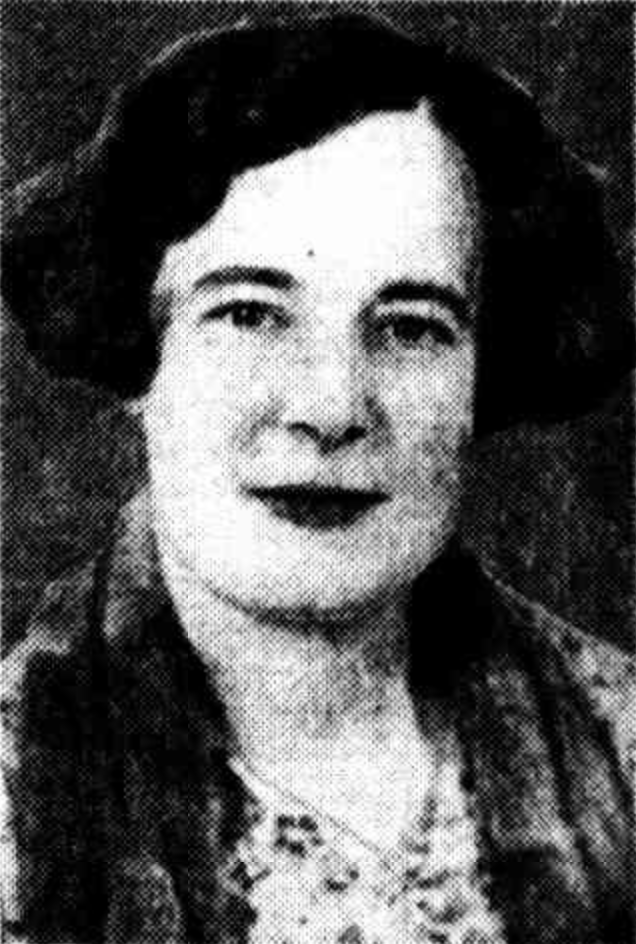
- Merry in 1937
- Born: 20 February 1907; Scarsdale, Victoria, Australia
- Died: 16 May 2000 (aged 93); Glen Iris, Victoria, Australia
- Other name: Belle Merry
- Occupations: Congregational minister and chaplain

Isabelle Elizabeth Merry OBE (1907–2000) was an Australian Congregational minister and chaplain at Queen Victoria Hospital in Melbourne, Victoria. She was the first woman accepted for theological studies at the Congregational College of Victoria. She was ordained to the Christian ministry in 1937, becoming the first woman to be ordained in the state of Victoria. She became a full-time chaplain at Queen Victoria Hospital in Melbourne, and was the first chaplain to be on the staff of a hospital in Australia. In 1976, she was awarded an OBE for her chaplaincy work.

== Early life and education ==
Isabelle Elizabeth Merry was born in Scarsdale or Coburg, Victoria, on 20 or 22 February 1907. Her parents were Elizabeth (née Wrigley) and engineer Charles William Merry. She attended Melbourne's University High School, where she graduated with honours. She served as head prefect in her senior year. After finished her secondary education, she began working at the State Savings Bank.

== Pastoral ministry ==
Active in the Congregational Church, Merry volunteered at the church's mission program during the Great Depression of the 1930s. Feeling called to the ministry, she made the decision to leave her job and pursue ordination. This was an unusual decision for a woman at the time, but the Congregational Church did allow the ordination of women. Winifred Kiek, the first woman ordained in the Congregational Church, had been ordained in 1927. Joan Hore was ordained in New South Wales in 1931, and Kate Hutley (née Keen) was ordained in 1932 in Port Adelaide. Hore was the only one of the three women still working in a pastorate in Australia at the time of Merry's ordination.

Merry earned a BA at the University of Melbourne while completing her studies in theology at Congregational College. She was the first woman accepted to the theology program at the college, the oldest theological program in Melbourne. She attended classes with ten men also studying for the ministry. Because she was a woman, Merry was not eligible to receive the bursary which was given to male students to support them while they studied. While a student, she pastored a Congregational Church in East Preston, Victoria.

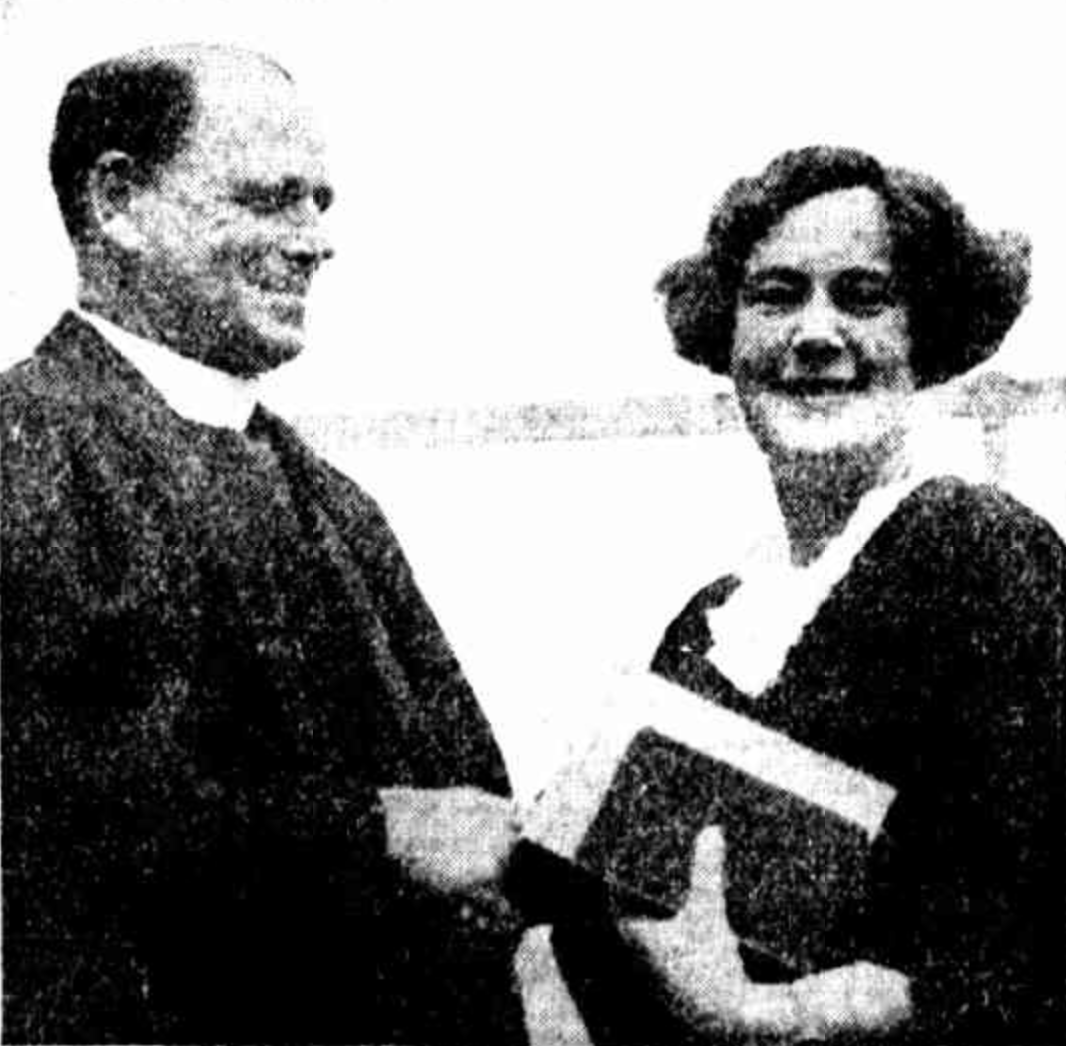
Isabelle Merry, with Rev. W. Albiston, following her ordination in 1937

Merry's application to pursue ordination was supported by her home congregation, the Collins Street Congregational Church, and approved by the regional Congregational body. Her ordination was held on 19 December 1937 at the Croydon Congregational Church. Merry was the first woman of any denomination to be ordained to Christian ministry in the state of Victoria.

From 1937 to 1945, Merry served as the pastor of the Croydon Congregational Church. Her pastorate encompassed the two communities of Croydon and Croydon North. In 1942, she took leave of absence from her parish work to serve as the extension secretary for war work at the YWCA in Melbourne. In this role, she organised activities for women working in munitions factories.

During the war years and afterwards, there was increased demand for qualified social workers in Australia, particularly in hospitals. Salaries were increased in an attempt to encourage people to enter the field. In 1941, University of Melbourne began training social workers in its Department of Social Studies. In 1945, Merry left her pastorate, and returned to the University of Melbourne to study social work. She then worked as an almoner in Melbourne. In 1949, she travelled to the United Kingdom, where she again worked as an almoner. She stayed in the United Kingdom until 1950.

In 1952, Merry began a pastorate at the North Balwyn Congregational Church. She also began working as a hospital chaplain. Merry was also active in the Women's Inter-Church Council in Victoria. In 1961, Merry attended the World Council of Churches Assembly in New Delhi. She went as a delegate for the Congregational Union of Australia, becoming the first woman to represent an Australian denomination at a WCC assembly. In 1975, she returned to the Croydon Congregational Church. She served as the minister there for two years.

== Chaplaincy ==
In 1954, Merry became a chaplain at the Queen Victoria Hospital. Established in 1896, the hospital had the motto "For Women, By Women". The hospital did not admit men as patients until 1965. The hospital also had women doctors, nurses and administrators. Merry was appointed as a full-time chaplain, and she was paid by the hospital, an arrangement that was ground-breaking at the time. At the time of her appointment, chaplaincy in Australian hospitals was conducted by visiting clergy from local churches. She was the first chaplain in Australia to be on the staff of a hospital.

Merry worked as the chaplain at the Queen Victoria Hospital until 1970. She provided pastoral counselling for patients, and also conducted baptisms and weddings. She believed that chaplains should have training in social work, in addition to their ministerial training, to help them effectively minister in hospital settings.

== Honours and death ==
On 12 June 1976, Merry was made an officer of the Order of the British Empire. She was recognised for "Religion & socio-economic work." She retired from ministry in 1977.

Merry died on 16 May 2000 at Glen Iris in Victoria and was cremated.
