= Zabel (given name) =

Zabel is a feminine given name common in Armenia. It is derived from Isabella. It may refer to

- Isabella, Queen of Armenia
- Zabel Sibil Asadour (1863–1934), Armenian poet, writer, publisher, educator and philanthropist
- Zabel Yesayan (1878–1943), Ottoman Armenian novelist and translator

== See also ==
- Zabelle
