= Isabella (given name) =

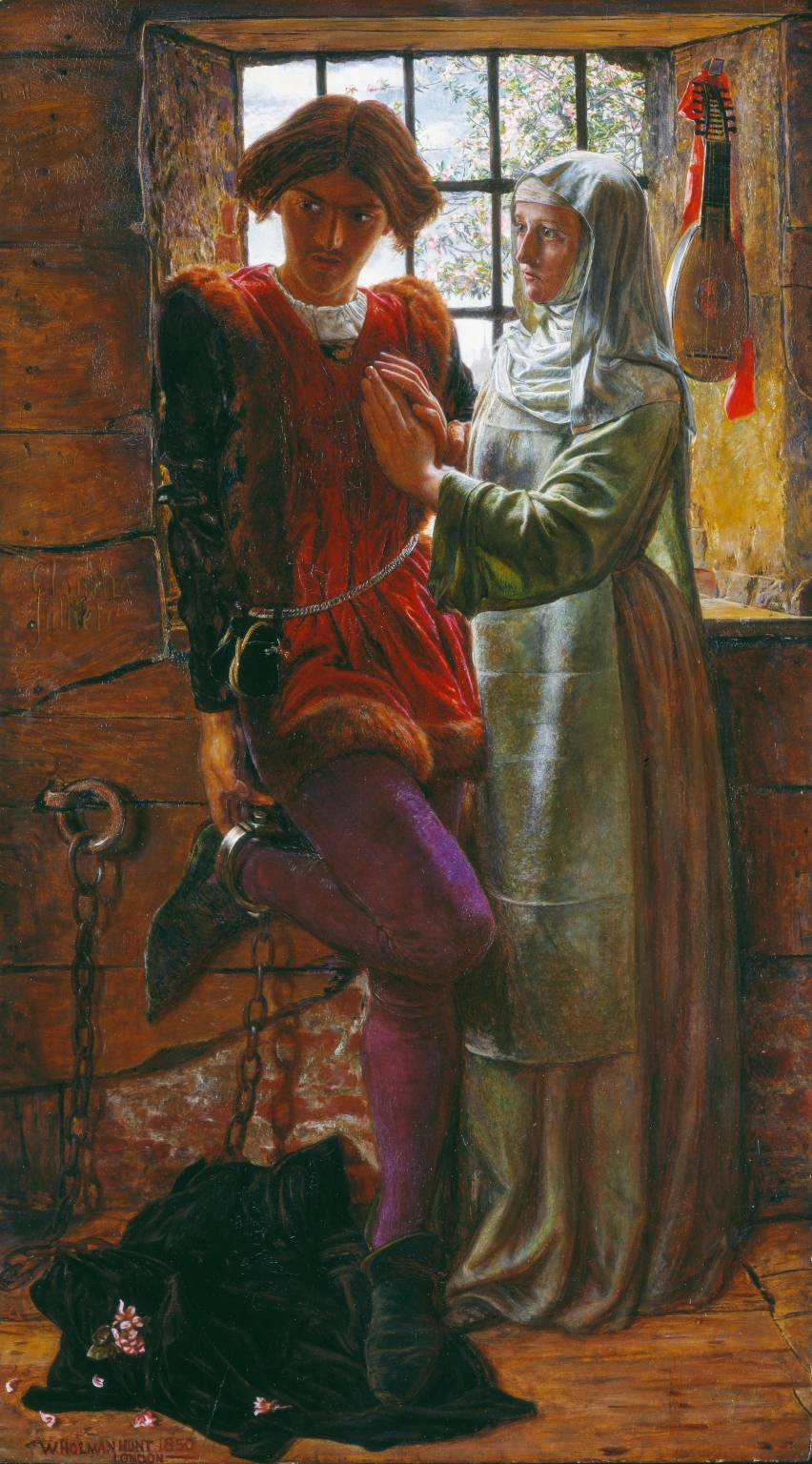
- Claudio and Isabella from William Shakespeare's Measure for Measure, by William Holman Hunt, 1850.
- Pronunciation: Italian: [iza'bɛlla]
- Gender: Female
- Language: Italian

Origin
- Origin: Hebrew via Greek and Latin
- Meaning: "God is my oath"
- Region of origin: Italy

Other names
- Nicknames: Izzy, Bella
- Related names: Bettina, Elisa, Élisa, Elisabel, Elisabeth, Élisabeth, Elisabetta, Elise, Élise, Elisheba, Elisheva, Eliza, Elizabeta, Elizabeth, Elize, Elsa, Elspeth, Esepeta, Isa, Isabeau, Isabel, Isabela, Isabell, Isabelle, Isabelly, Ishbel, Isobel, Izabel, Izabela, Izabella, Lisa, Ysabeau, Ysabel, Ysabell, Ysabella, Zabel
- See also: Bella

Isabella or Isabela is a feminine given name, the Latinate and Italian form of Isabel, the Spanish form Isabelle, the French form, and Isobel, the Scottish form of the name Elizabeth. All are ultimately derived from the Hebrew Elisheba. Isabella has been in wide use in the Anglosphere since the 1700s and has been a popular name in recent years. It is particularly well used for Hispanic girls in the United States. A common diminutive form is Bella. Notable people with the name include:

== People ==
=== Royalty ===
- Queen Isabella (disambiguation), the name of many queens
- Isabella of Aragon (disambiguation)
- Isabella of Castile (disambiguation)
- Isabella of France (disambiguation)
- Isabella of Spain (disambiguation)
- Isabella, Countess of Atholl, ban-mormaer of Atholl, Scotland, 1211–1236/7
- Isabella, Countess of Menteith (1217–1272)
- Isabella of Mar (c. 1277–1296), first wife of Robert the Bruce
- Isabella MacDuff, Countess of Buchan, 13th-14th century
- Isabella of France (1295–1358), Queen consort of England as the wife of Edward II of England
- Isabella, Countess of Brienne (1306–1360), Countess of Lecce and Brienne
- Isabella of Valois, Duchess of Bourbon (1313–1388), wife of Peter I, Duke of Bourbon
- Isabella, Countess of Fife (c. 1320–1389)
- Isabella, Countess of Bedford (1332–1379), daughter of King Edward III of England
- Isabella, Countess of Foix (c. 1361–1428), Viscountess of Béarn
- Isabella, Duchess of Lorraine (1400–1453), Queen of Naples
- Isabella of Bourbon (1436–1465), Countess Consort of Charolais
- Isabella I of Castile (1451–1504, "Queen Isabella of Spain"), Queen of Castile and León, wife of Ferdinand II of Aragon
- Isabella of Aragon, Queen of Portugal (1470–1498), Princess of Asturias
- Isabella of Aragon, Duchess of Milan (1470–1524), Princess of Naples, Duchess Consort of Milan
- Isabella d'Este (1474–1539), Marchesa of Mantua
- Isabella Feltria della Rovere (1552–1629), Princess of Bisignano
- Isabella II of Spain (1830–1904), queen regnant of Spain from 1843 until 1868
- Isabella, Princess of Asturias (1851–1931), daughter of Queen Isabella II
- Princess Isabella of Denmark (born 2007), daughter of King Frederik X and Queen Mary of Denmark

=== Other ===
- Isabella Acres (born 2001), American actress
- Isabella Ajalla (born 2008), Argentine artistic gymnast
- Isabella Andreini (1562–1604), Italian actress and writer
- Izabella Alvarez (born 2004), American actress
- Isabella Arcila (born 1994), Colombian swimmer
- Isabella Belfer, oldest woman imprisoned in Israel
- Isabella Bird (1831–1904), English explorer, writer, and a natural historian
- Isabella Blake-Thomas (born 2002), British voice actress
- Isabella Blow (1958–2007), English magazine editor
- Isabella Eugénie Boyer (1841–1904), French-American model and heiress
- Isabella Boylston (born 1986), American ballet dancer
- Isabella Brown (born 2004), English weightlifter
- Isabella Brownson (born 1998), English actress
- Isabella Campbell, Countess Cawdor (born 1966), British fashion editor
- Isabella Castillo (born 1994), Cuban-American actress and singer
- Isabella Cramp (born 2004), American voice actress
- Isabella Ferreira (born 2002), American actress
- Isabella Fierro (born 2000), Mexican golfer
- Isabella Flores (born 2003), American ice dancer
- Isabelle Foerder (born 1979), Paralympic athlete from Germany
- Isabella Forbes (1913–2002), Scottish aristocrat, farmer, and dancer
- Bella French Swisher (1837–1893), American writer
- Isabella Gardner (1915–1981), American poet
- Isabella Hadid, known as Bella Hadid (born 1996), American model
- Isabella Hofmann (born 1958), American actress
- Isabella Hammad (born 1990/1991), British-Palestinian author
- Isabella Isaksen (born 1993), modern pentathlete from the United States
- Isabella Jameson (b. 1866), English teacher, co-founded the All England Women’s Hockey Association
- Isabella Jobson (1878–1943), Australian nurse who served in World War I
- Isabella Kelly (1759–1857), Scottish novelist and poet
- Isabella Kruger (born 2005), South African tennis player
- Isabella Leong (born 1988), Macanese actress and former singer
- Isabella Lombardo, Australian child with spastic quadriplegic cerebral palsy
- Isabella Longuinho, Brazilian digital influencer
- Isabella Lovestory (born 1993), Honduran singer
- Isabella Macdonald Macdonald (1856–1947), British physician
- Isabella Markham (1527–1579), English courtier and Gentlewoman
- Isabella Manfredi (born 1987), Australian rock musician
- Isabella García-Manzo, Salvadoran beauty pageant titleholder
- Isabella Menin (born 1996), Brazilian model and beauty queen
- Isabella Molyneux, Countess of Sefton (1748–1819), British peeress
- Isabella di Morra (c.1520–1545/1546), Italian poet
- Isabella Nardoni (2002–2008), Brazilian murder victim
- Isabella Preston (1881–1965), Canadian horticulturist
- Isabella Rossellini (born 1952), Italian actress, filmmaker, author, philanthropist, and model
- Isabella Rudkin (1821/3–1888), Anglo-Irish child musical prodigy known as "The Infant Lyra"
- Isabella Santoni (born 1995), Brazilian actress
- Isabella Stewart Gardner (1840–1924), American art collector and philanthropist
- Isabella Vincent (1734–1802), English singer and actress
- Isabella Vincent (swimmer) (born 2006), Australian Paralympic swimmer
- Isabella Weber (born 1987), German economist active in the United States
- Isabella Whitney (1546/1548, died after 1624), English poet and writer

== Fictional characters ==
- Isabella, a stock character in Italian comedy
- Isabella Knightley, Emma's sister in Emma by Jane Austen
- Isabella Garcia-Shapiro, a main character in the Disney Channel series, Phineas and Ferb
- Isabella "Bella" Swan, protagonist of the Twilight series by Stephenie Meyer
- Isabella Toscano, character from the NBC soap opera Days of Our Lives
- Isabella Braña Williams, a former character on the American soap opera The Young and the Restless
- Isabella "Ivy" Valentine, from Soulcalibur
- Isabella, the title character of an Italian comic book series
- Isabella, in Thomas Kyd's The Spanish Tragedy

== See also ==
- Isabel
