= John Neville, 1st Marquess of Montagu =

English nobleman (c. 1431 – 1471)

John Neville
- Baron Montagu; Earl of Northumberland; Marquess of Montague
- Born: c. 1431
- Died: 14 April 1471 (aged c. 40); Barnet, Hertfordshire, England
- Buried: Bisham Abbey, Berkshire
- Noble family: Neville
- Spouse: Isabel Ingoldisthorpe (m. 1457)
- Issue: George Neville, Duke of Bedford; Anne Neville; Elizabeth Neville; Margaret Neville; Lucy Neville; Isabel Neville
- Father: Richard Neville, 5th Earl of Salisbury
- Mother: Alice Montagu, 5th Countess of Salisbury

John Neville, 1st Marquess of Montagu KG (c. 1431 – 14 April 1471) was a major magnate of fifteenth-century England. He was a younger son of Richard Neville, 5th Earl of Salisbury, and the younger brother of Richard Neville, Earl of Warwick, the "Kingmaker".

From an early age, he was involved in fighting for his House, particularly in the feud that sprang up in the 1450s with the Neville family's major regional rivals, the Percy family. John Neville was personally responsible for much of the violence until, with his brothers, they defeated and imprisoned their enemies. This was taking place against the backdrop of a crisis in central government. The king, Henry VI, already known to be a weak ruler, suffered a mental collapse which led to a protectorate headed by John's uncle, Richard, Duke of York. Within two years an armed conflict had broken out, with York openly in rebellion against the king, and his Neville cousins supporting him. John fought with his father and Warwick against the king at the first Battle of St Albans, at which they had the victory.

Following a few years of uneasy peace, the Yorkists' rebellion erupted once again, and John Neville fought alongside his father and elder brother Thomas at the Battle of Blore Heath in September 1459. Although the Earl of Salisbury fought off the Lancastrians, both his sons were captured, and John, with Thomas, spent the next year imprisoned. Following his release in 1460, he took part in the Yorkist government. His father and brother died in battle just after Christmas 1460, and in February the next year, John – now promoted to the peerage as Lord Montagu – and Warwick fought the Lancastrians again at St Albans. John was once again captured and not released until his cousin Edward, York's son, won a decisive victory at Towton in March 1461, and became King Edward IV.

John Neville soon emerged, with Warwick, as representatives of the king's power in the north, which was still politically turbulent, as there were still a large number of Lancastrians on the loose attempting to raise a rebellion against the new regime. As his brother Warwick became more involved in national politics and central government, it devolved to John to finally defeat the last remnants of Lancastrians in 1464. Following these victories, Montagu, in what has been described as a high point for his House, was created Earl of Northumberland. At around the same time, however, his brother Warwick became increasingly dissatisfied with his relationship with the king, and began instigating rebellions against Edward IV in the north, finally capturing him in July 1469. At first, Montagu helped suppress this discontent, and also encouraged Warwick to release Edward. Eventually, however, his brother went into French exile with the king's brother George, Duke of Clarence, in March 1470.

During Warwick's exile, King Edward stripped Montagu of the Earldom of Northumberland, making him Marquis of Montagu instead. John Neville appears to have seen this as a reduction in rank, and accepted it with poor grace. He seems particularly to have complained about the lack of landed estate that his new marquisate brought with it, calling it a "pie's nest". When the Earl of Warwick and Clarence returned, they distracted Edward with a rebellion in the north, which the king ordered Montagu to raise troops to repress in the king's name. Montagu, however, having raised a small army, turned against Edward, almost capturing him at Olney, Buckinghamshire; the king, with his other brother Richard, Duke of Gloucester, fled into exile in Burgundy.

While in exile, Warwick had allied with the old king, Henry VI and his Queen, Margaret of Anjou, Henry was restored to the throne, and Warwick now effectively ruled the kingdom, This return to Lancastrianism did not, however, last long; within the year, Edward and Gloucester had returned. Landing only a few miles from Montagu in Yorkshire – who did nothing to stop them – the Yorkists marched south, raising an army. Montagu followed them, and, meeting up with his brother at Coventry, they confronted Edward over a battlefield at Barnet. John Neville was cut down in the fighting, Warwick died soon after, and within a month Edward had reclaimed his throne and Henry VI and his line was extinguished.

== Youth and early career ==
Montagu was the third son of Richard Neville, 5th Earl of Salisbury, and Alice Montacute, 5th Countess of Salisbury, and a younger brother of Richard Neville, 16th Earl of Warwick, "the Kingmaker."

John Neville's upbringing and career was entwined with that of the north of England and specifically, the marcher areas, the eastern and western borders between Scotland and England, controlled from Berwick and Carlisle respectively. His early activity there consisted of diplomatic meetings with the Scots, at which he acted as a witness, between 1449 and 1451. He was also one of three men who were instructed, in a letter of 3 February 1449, to not attend the forthcoming parliament and remain in the north guarding the border. He was knighted by King Henry VI at Greenwich on 5 January 1453, alongside Edmund and Jasper Tudor, his brother Thomas Neville, William Herbert, Roger Lewknor, and William Catesby.

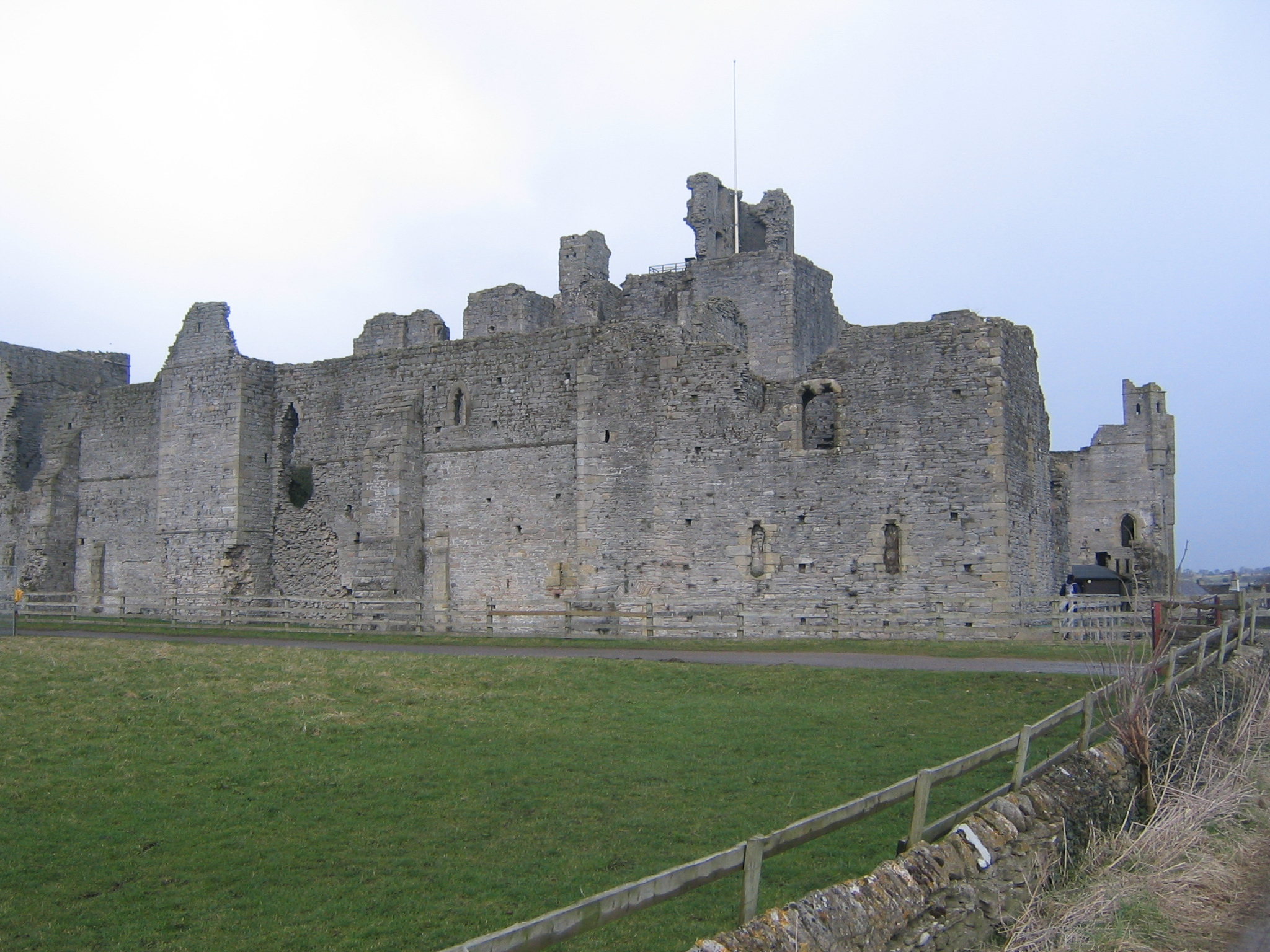
Middleham Castle today; this was his father's caput.

=== Feud with the Percys ===
Sir John Neville was from the branch of the Neville family based at Middleham Castle in Yorkshire, rather than that of Westmorland. It has been claimed that he, as a "landless younger son" was partially to blame for his family's long-running feud with the Lancastrian Percy family of Northumberland. The first outburst of violence that took place was a result of the 1 May 1453 royal licence for John Neville's brother, Thomas Neville to marry Maud Stanhope being issued. News of this must have reached the north within the fortnight, for by the twelfth, one of the Earl of Northumberland's younger sons, Thomas Percy, Lord Egremont, began recruiting men. In August 1453, John Neville raided the Percy castle of Topcliffe, possibly with the intention of seizing Egremont. Failing to find him, Neville resorted to threatening the Percy tenantry who were in residence. He and Egremont were subsequently summoned to appear before the Royal Council, a summons which was ignored by both. Feuding continued through summer 1453, and even though they had been instructed to keep the peace, by 27 July, the council was issuing letters to Northumberland and Salisbury regarding their sons. This was followed by more letters to the sons. In Knaresborough, the locals generally aligned themselves with John Neville due to the unpopularity of Sir William Plumpton (the king's man), from whom they began stealing with impunity, which resulted in severe injuries when the Neville brothers demonstrated a "show of force" in January 1454.

John Neville was with his brother's wedding party when Egremont ambushed them on the return from Tattershall Castle. This took place on Heworth Moor on 24 August 1453. The next month, John took a raiding party and ransacked Egremont's Catton manor, "breaking windows and shattering tiles." With his brothers, Thomas and Richard, as well as the Earl of Salisbury, they faced the Earl of Northumberland and his sons at Topcliffe on 20 October 1453, although a peace was then negotiated. The feud continued for much of the next year, and only came to a halt with a battle at Salisbury's manor of Stamford Bridge, near York on 31 October 1454. Thomas and John confronted, and decisively beat, Egremont and Richard Percy, whom the Nevilles captured.

== Marriage ==
John Neville married Isabel Ingoldsthorpe (Note: Isabel Ingoldsthorpe is occasionally also referred to as Elizabeth in Exchequer records.) (c.1441 – 20 May 1476), of Burrough Green and Sawston, Cambridgeshire, on 25 April 1457; Archbishop Thomas Bourchier officiated the marriage at Canterbury Cathedral. Isabel was not only the heiress of her father, Sir Edmund Ingoldsthorpe (who had died on 2 September 1456), but also the heiress of her maternal uncle, John Tiptoft and his Earldom of Worcester. It may have been that Earl of Worcester had engineered the match. A letter to John Paston on 1 May 1457 described how "the Erle [of Warwick's] yonger broþere maryed to Ser Edmund Ynglthorp's doughter upon Seynt Markes Day; the Erle of Worcestre broght aboute the maryage." She was a greater heiress than might have been expected for a youngest son like John. John was granted seven southern manors by his father and mother, the Earl and Countess of Salisbury, for his part. (Note: Although cf. Hick's Warwick the Kingmaker (131), in which he states that it was eight manors.)

John Neville's marriage caused a dispute with Queen Margaret: even though Isabel was over fourteen years old (and therefore of legal age), the Queen claimed that Isabel was still her ward. As a result, Queen Margaret insisted that John pay her a fine for his marriage to Isabel: he was bound to pay her £1,000 in ten instalments.

== Wars of the Roses ==
The king had become incapacitated in August 1453, which had led to the Duke of York being appointed protector and controlling the government. By Christmas of 1454, however, King Henry had recovered from his illness, which removed the basis for York's authority. Having reconvened the court at Westminster by mid-April 1455, Henry and a select council of nobles decided to hold a great council at Leicester. York and the Nevilles anticipated that Somerset would bring charges against them at this assembly. John Neville included, they gathered an armed retinue and marched to stop the royal party from reaching Leicester, intercepting them at St Albans.

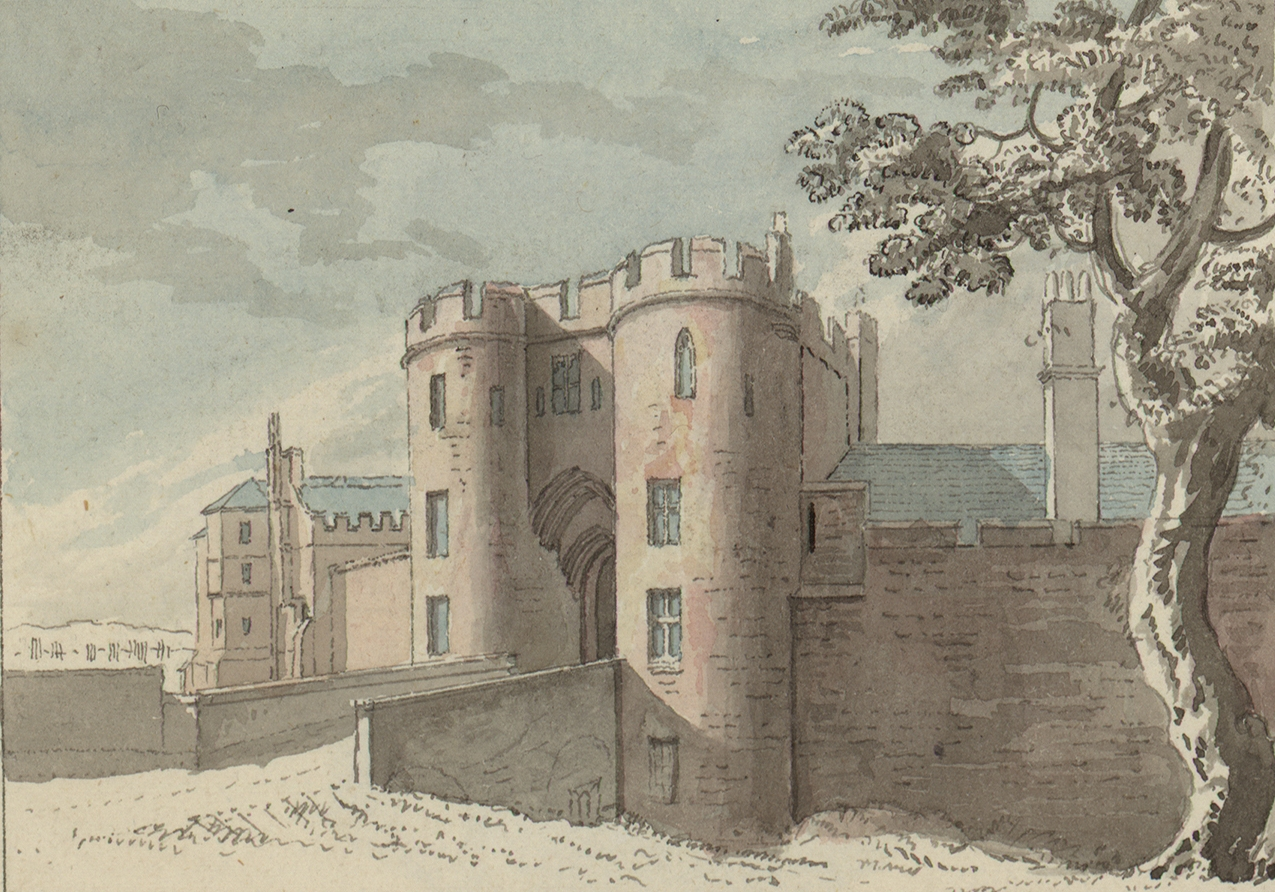
The gate of Chester Castle; John and his brother were imprisoned here for a year.

Although only a small affray, it resulted in the deaths of some important people; viz. the Duke of Somerset, the Earl of Northumberland, and Lord Clifford. It has been suggested that, while Somerset might have been targeted by York, the latter too might have been intentionally slain by the Neville brothers. It was John who, after the battle, appears to have been responsible for the victorious Duke of York removing Sir William Skipwith from the household offices the latter held of the Duke. Neville was said to have achieved this by pointing out how Skipwith failed to join York in battle; John Neville subsequently shared in the profits of York's redistribution of Skipwith's ex-offices.

In December 1456, the new Duke of Somerset tried to attack John Neville in London's Cheapside; Somerset had already attempted something similar to John's brother Warwick the previous month. John's encounter, reported contemporary chroniclers, would have become a "skirmish" if the mayor had not intervened. As it had been John who had "spearheaded" the Neville retaliation to the Percies during their feud, Salisbury entered into a bond for Thomas and John's behaviour on 23 March 1458. John, however, continued to receive commissions from the government. He was part of a delegation of twenty-two Ambassadors nominated to discuss breaches of the Truce with Burgundy on 14 May that year, and two months later he was investigating the murder of a royal serjeant. In 1459, he was appointed steward of the Honour of Pontefract.

Reconciliation between the crown and the sons of the dead lords of St Albans on the one half and of York and his Neville allies did not last, however. In mid-September 1459, the Earl of Salisbury, intending to meet York at the latter's castle at Ludlow, marched south from Middleham Castle with his household, retainers, and a force of around five-thousand men. John and Thomas were with him. Salisbury's force was engaged by a much larger royal army under the command of Lord Audley on 23 September at Blore Heath, near Mucklestone, Staffordshire. Even though he had numerical superiority the result was a defeat for Audley, who was killed. However at some point John Neville – along with his brother Thomas and their father's retainer James Harrington were captured. This might have occurred in their pursuit of fleeing Lancastrians the next day or alternatively they may have been injured in battle and had been sent home. Either way, captured at Acton Bridge near Tarporley, Cheshire, the four were imprisoned in Chester Castle.

John Neville was not released until July 1460. As a result, he was not present at the Yorkists' rout at the Battle of Ludford Bridge, which resulted in his father and brother's exile in Calais. He had still been attainted at the Parliament of Devils in October 1459 and only restored in August the next year. He was not released until June that year, and remained in London during York's return from exile, and his claiming of the throne. On 1 November 1460, York appointed John the king's Chamberlain for a crown-wearing ceremony at St Paul's Cathedral. He stayed in London as word arrived that Lancastrians were gathering an army in the north; York, Salisbury, and John's brother Thomas marched north to confront them. On 30 December 1460, they went down to a crushing defeat outside York's castle at Sandal, at the Battle of Wakefield where York and Thomas were killed, and Salisbury captured and beheaded the next day.

John Neville appears to have been Lieutenant of the castle of Calais, while Warwick served as its Captain. During the Protector's absence that winter, and after York's and Salisbury's death, alongside his brothers Warwick and George (the Chancellor) Neville was part of the head of government.

== Elevation to the peerage and war in the north ==
According to Benet's Chronicle, John Neville was elevated to the peerage as Lord Montagu in the January 1461 parliament. It was also at this parliament that he presented a petition, regarding his wife, in which he reiterated that in common law women receive livery of their lands at fourteen years of age, and he requested parliament to reaffirm this. In February he was elected to the Order of the Garter. He was installed on 21 March 1462, when he took his father's choir stall in Windsor Castle's St. George's Chapel.

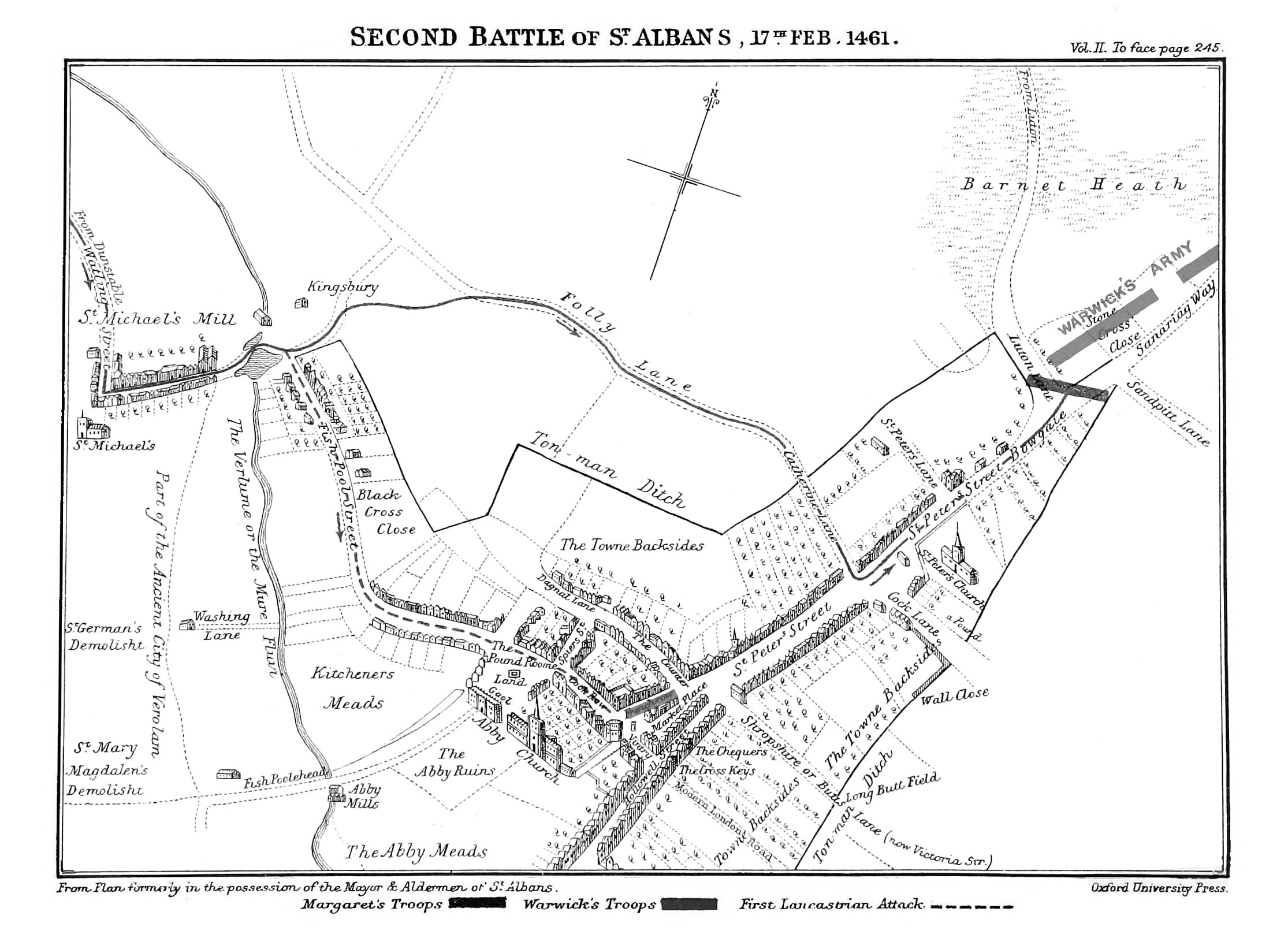
Map for Second Battle of St Albans by Ramsay.

By February 1461 Queen Margaret's army was marching south. Warwick and John, with their "frantically raised" army, collected the King and marched north to confront the Queen's army on the Great North Road. The two armies met on 17 February at the Second Battle of St Albans – this time, just outside the town. In the resulting encounter, Warwick was "outflanked and now outmatched," whereas John seems to have kept his army together up until the point the King's person was regained by the Lancastrians. Montagu commanded the left flank of the Yorkist army, which itself was subdivided into a group of archers in the town itself, with the majority posted on Bernards Heath, stretching eastwards towards Warwick's vanguard. This "bloody and bitter encounter" saw Warwick and John's army defeated. The Earl escaped; Montagu was captured and sent to York Castle.

It seems probable that he escaped execution after the battle because, as the Milanese Ambassador wrote, "a brother of my lord of Somerset is a prisoner [of Warwick's] at Calais."

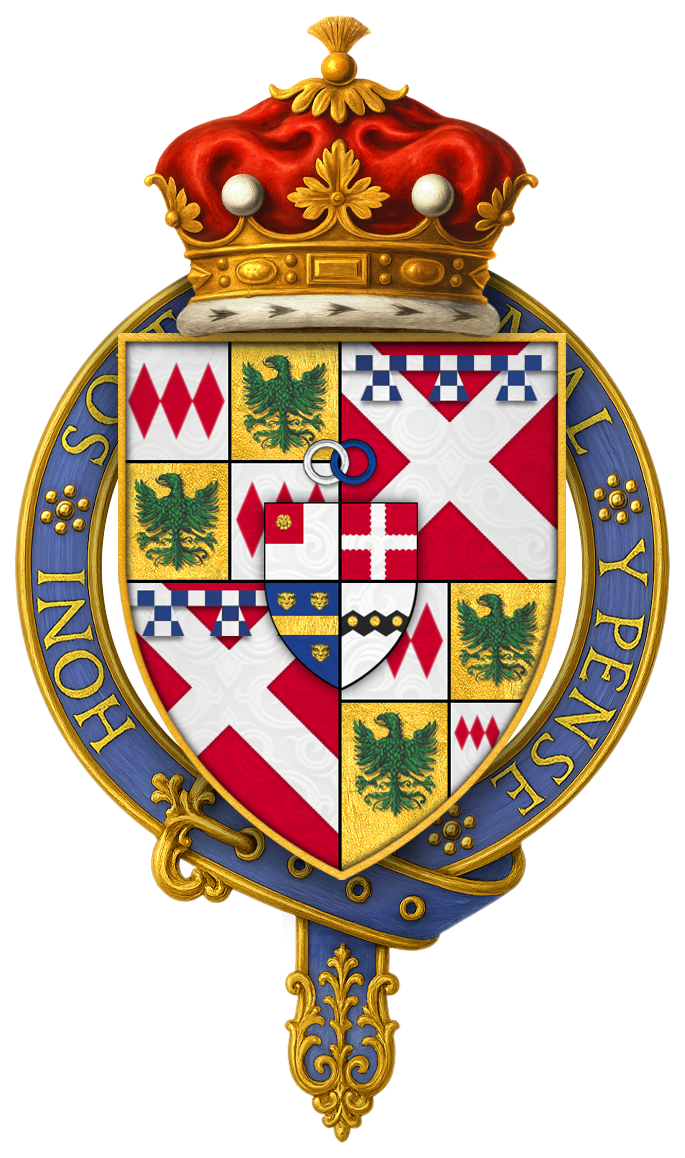
Quartered arms of Sir John Neville, Lord Montagu, KG

As a result of his capture and imprisonment in York, Montagu escaped participation in the biggest and probably bloodiest battle of the Wars of the Roses which took place on 29 March 1461 at Towton in Yorkshire. This decisive Yorkist victory led to Montagu being released the next day, when the son of the Duke of York – and England's de facto new king – Edward IV entered York in triumph. Montagu and Warwick then stayed in the north to attempt the recapture of northern castles still in Lancastrian hands; as John Gillingham has put it, "the unfinished military business would have to be left to the Nevilles." And on 10 May 1461 Montagu was commissioned to raise troops against both the Lancastrian remnants and the king of Scotland. One of Montagu's first actions was to successfully raise the siege of Carlisle, "with prompt action." Carlisle had had its suburbs burnt and been under siege from June by a Scottish-Lancastrian force, but was easily relieved by him, apparently killing 6,000 Scots and Lord Clifford's brother in the process, before Warwick had even arrived.

The military campaign that followed was focused on the recapture of strategically vital castles on the Northumbrian border. Alnwick Castle was commanded by a shell keep, to which extra towers had been added, as well as to the curtain wall, with a solid barbican and gatehouse. Bamburgh Castle was on a high spur ridge with three baileys, a large keep, and fortified gateways. Dunstanburgh Castle stood on a dolerite spur which had the sheer drop of a cliff on one side. Montagu besieged Bamburgh, the most important of these northern bulwarks, due to its distance from London and proximity to Scotland. By 26 December 1462, when the garrison surrendered, they "had been reduced to eating their horses."

Montagu joined Warwick in escorting the chariot of six horses in the funeral cortege conveying the mortal remains of their father and brother from Pontefract Castle to the family mausoleum at Bisham Abbey, on 14–15 February 1463. On 6 May he was appointed Warden of the Eastern March; Warwick was his counterpart on the western marches. Later that year, he led an expedition to Norham Castle, which had been besieged by the Scots for the previous eighteen days, and relieved it on 26 July; this was followed by a Chevauchée into Scotland which only ceased when Montagu's force ran out of supplies.

=== Royal patronage ===
In the meantime though, John received the first royal patronage of the reign, being granted the royal gold and silver mines in Devon and Cornwall worth £110 annually, for life. This was followed by duty payments from York and Kingston upon Hull and manors belonging to the dead Lancastrian Viscount Beaumont. In June 1461 he received the wardship of Edward Tiptoft, the heir of John Tiptoft, during his minority, and also the lands of Lord Clifford (who had died at Ferrybridge in a sharp encounter the night before Towton). Professor A. J. Pollard has noted, ironically, that Neville "had to earn his rewards." In 1462 he was appointed Steward of the Household of the Palatinate of Durham, for which he received around £40 a year. This was twice the salary his legally trained and "non-noble" successors would receive from the Bishop in later years, and has been described as a "unique post."

== Hexham and Hedgeley Moor ==
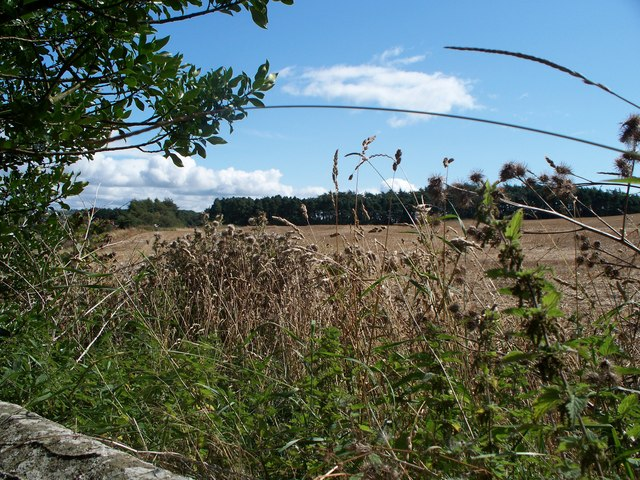
The battle site of Hedgley Moor, where Montagu defeated a Lancastrian army in 1464.

In spite of Montagu's and Warwick's northern successes in the years following Towton, a not-insubstantial Lancastrian army was still active in the area; it had been slowly re-taking castles, like Bamburgh, Langley, Norham, and Prudhoe Castles, between February and March 1464. This threatened Newcastle, a major Yorkist supply centre. Local Lancastrians were returning to their estates, such as the Cliffords, who regained their castle at Skipton Craven with no royal response, military or otherwise. They "virtually controlled most of the country immediately south of the Scottish border", wrote Charles Ross, although very few local gentry directly supported them. The situation was severe enough that in April 1464 he was too occupied with the northern situation to travel to London, and was exempted from attending the Order of the Garter Chapter meeting on the 29th of the month. He has been described as the king's 'resident commander' in the north and a "confident and aggressive commander."

In early 1464, the Lancastrians having coalesced in the East March, the ongoing peace negotiations with the Scots were moved from Newcastle to York. Montagu was sent to escort their embassy through now-unfriendly territory. On his way to pick them up at Norham, he only avoided an ambush near Newcastle, by a small force of eighty spear and bowmen under Sir Humphrey Neville, by changing his route.

The Scottish embassy he eventually collected at Norham had been delayed, and it was on the return journey that the Duke of Somerset with Lords Roos and Hungerford, Sir Richard Turnstall, and Sir Thomas Findern and the bulk of the Lancastrian army (approximately 5,000 men) ambushed Montagu at the Battle of Hedgeley Moor on 25 April 1464. The assault failed, and left Sir Ralph Percy dead on the field.

Montagu, having delivered the Scottish embassy to Newcastle, left there on 14 May, either with Lords Greystoke and Willoughby or picking them up en route with other supporters, to seek out the Lancastrians. The next day, at Hexham – having crossed the Tyne "either at Bulwell or Corbridge" – he attacked the rebels in their camp which was on the south side of Devil's Water river. Montagu, his army swelled with new recruits from Newcastle, and men raised by Montagu's brother, the Archbishop of York, may have had up to 10,000 men. Leading his army "forward at the charge," Montagu's attack soon became a rout, with the Lancastrian army dissolving and attempting escape over the bridge. Lords Roos, Hungerford, Findern, and Tallboys survived the battle only to be executed, on Montagu's order – and probably in his presence – with the Duke of Somerset in Newcastle. Following Hexham, Montagu ordered the largest number of beheadings the civil wars had yet seen.

=== Earl of Northumberland ===
In May 1464, Hexham, Langley and Bywell castles surrendered to Montagu. Eight days later, on 27 May, he was created Earl of Northumberland, while Henry Percy was imprisoned in the Tower. The Earldom gave an income of between £700 and £1,000 a year. This, wrote Cora L. Scofield, was his reward for his decisive victories, since the Crown "had played no direct part in them." That summer Montagu recaptured the three Northumberland castles – Dunstanburgh, Alnwick, and Bamburgh – that had been previously lost. Later that year – the "high watermark of his House, the zenith of the Nevilles" – Montagu's brother George was appointed Archbishop of York, with John his Treasurer at his enthronement feast. During the feast, John's wife Isabel, sat at the children's table, supervising Warwick's two daughters and the young Duke of Gloucester.

== Later years ==
Following the final crushing of the Lancastrian resistance, Montagu's role focussed on diplomacy and peacekeeping. In June 1465 he was commissioned to contract marriages "between English and Scottish subjects" as well as to treat for perpetual peace with Scotland, as a result of which, Montagu returned the captured Duke of Albany to Scotland, for which he was paid fifty marks. It was during this time (Hicks has suggested around January 1465) that Montagu and Lord Scales were requested by the Duke of Brittany to accompany a force of 3,000 Breton archers supplied by him, for the League of the Public Weal against Louis XI of France. However, due to commitments in the north with Warwick, Montagu ended up taking no part in this campaign.

In 1465 Montagu received the main grant of the Percy Earldom of Northumberland estates, and on 25 March the following year he was granted the constableships and honours of Pontefract and Castles, which Warwick and before him their father had previously held, and also the castles of Tickhill, Snaith, and Dunstanburgh. This was to repay his arrears in back wages from his Wardenship of the East March, from an indenture of 1 June 1463. On the same day he was made Steward of the Duchy of Lancaster (north of the Trent), and it was from the profits of the duchy that his wages were coming from, amounting to approximately £1,000.

=== Warden of the Marches ===
The Wardens were the military guardians of the border from the late fourteenth century, and their salaries made them the highest-paid among Crown officers, but this was inclusive of the cost of raising troops and maintaining defence. This has also been described as controlling "private armies raised at the Crown's expense." By the mid-fifteenth century, the Wardenship of the East March was the most important of the two northern marcher lordships. Marcher Wardens were granted the right to recruit by their being "explicitly" exempted from the 1468 Statute of Livery, which restrained- or attempted to restrain- retaining. Montagu, however, was allowed to continue retaining in times of peace as well as war. At this point Humphrey Neville was still on the run, and Montagu required troops to be raised on various occasions; in 1467, for example, Beverley sent him troops to deal with Humphrey's resistance.

=== Warwick's rebellion ===
In 1467, as part of his brother's plan for a closer relationship with the French, John and Isabelle accompanied Warwick in escorting the French King's envoys to Canterbury. However, by this time, it was being rumoured that Warwick was moving towards supporting the House of Lancaster, as a result of dissatisfaction over the king's marriage to Elizabeth Woodville and his pursuit of an anti-French foreign policy. In 1469, Warwick organised Robin of Redesdale's rebellion against Edward IV in Yorkshire and in July that year the king's brother George, Duke of Clarence married Warwick's daughter Isabelle while anchored off Calais; this was in direct defiance of the king's own wishes. It seems that Montagu, however, reacted strongly against his brother's machinations, and, unlike him, was satisfied with his current position.

On 27 October 1469, Henry Percy had taken his oath of fealty to the King, and had been released from the Tower. The following year saw the return of Robin of Redesdale and another rebellion on behalf of Warwick. Montagu was forced to come down from the Scottish border to suppress it; this he did, but, one historian has suggested, albeit that he "allowed the leaders to escape ... ensuring that the rebellion could rise again" at a more opportune moment. Almost immediately, Montagu was forced to crush another rebellion, this time led by a Robin of Holderness, but calling for the return of Percy to the Northumberland Earldom. The Redesdale rebels soon reformed into an army big enough to march south and defeat a royal force at the Battle of Edgcote on 24 July 1469. King Edward still accepted that Montagu was uninvolved in his brother's rebellion, and in the event, Montagu was the only Neville to accompany the king on his journey from the north back to London.

However, it was while Edward was in York that he ordered the rehabilitation of Henry Percy to his family Earldom on 25/27 March 1470. On the same day John was elevated to the Marquessate of Montagu, and now outranked his brother, an Earl, in the English peerage. Historians have since questioned, however, whether his new title had the gravitas that his previous Earldom had had, and have even suggested that the king was "walking a tightrope" as to whether Montagu would actually accept it or not. To compensate him for the loss of the Percy estates Montagu was granted the lands of the dead Earl of Devon, and Montagu's son, George was created Duke of Bedford. These were substantial estates, providing an income of at least £600 per annum. Montagu was to be the new regional magnate – as he had been in the north – to fill an existing power vacuum.

== Rebellion and death ==
Montagu, though, was not happy with the new arrangements, and King Edward has been held responsible for turning Montagu from a friend to an enemy. Warkworth's Chronicle describes him as condemning these grants to him as "a [mag]pyes nest." Montagu had been on the Scottish border since at least January 1470. Following unrest in Lincolnshire and the subsequent Lincolnshire rebellion, the king marched from London to crush the rising. This he did at the Battle of Empingham. Following the battle, Edward headed north where he was met by Montagu and Northumberland at Doncaster. Warwick and Clarence's involvement in the Lincolnshire uprising had by now been established, and they fled to Calais. Further trouble broke out in the summer of 1470 in the north, with friends and relatives of Warwick in open rebellion. The new Earl of Northumberland was unable to put down these risings, so the king, once again marched north to deal with it personally. Modern historians generally consider that these rebellions were a deliberate trap, instigated by Warwick and Clarence from Calais. On 24 June 1470 the Wardenship of the East March was stripped from Montagu and given to Percy. Edward was still in the north with Percy when he received word that Warwick and Clarence had landed in Dartmouth.

At Doncaster, the king awaited Montagu, who was in the north raising a substantial force in Edward's name. Edward waited; but on 29 September 1470, marching to the King, Montagu declared for Warwick. His last-minute, surprise defection from the king has been called "decisive". The king was trapped; disbanding his army, and with a few followers, he escaped to Bishop's Lynn, sailing for Burgundy on 2 October.

=== Readeption of Henry VI ===
On 3 October, with Edward IV in exile, Henry VI was released from the Tower and returned to the throne by Warwick. Almost immediately, Montagu was granted the wardship of the executed Earl of Worcester's heir and estates, as well as of the young Lord Clifford. He was reappointed to the Wardenship of the East March, with its salary, on 22 October 1470.

However, Montagu did not profit from the new regime as he probably expected to. He did not regain the Earldom of Northumberland. Further, he lost some of the Courtney lands that had come with his Marquessate to the newly returned Earl of Devon. Montagu had no active role in government, and does not seem to have sat in Council, although he was appointed Chamberlain to the King's Household. Although he was confirmed in command of the new King's forces in the north and in possession of the manor of Wressle on 21 March 1471, he did not regain any other Percy estates. Indeed, it has been suggested that his loyalty might still have been suspected by the newly arrived Lancastrians: having been summoned to the November 1470 parliament, Polydore Virgil states that he had to apologise there for his prior support of Edward. Montagu even had to pay cash for the king's pardon, which he only received after making a lengthy speech, declaring that he had only remained faithful to Edward out of fear.

Montagu, having responsibility for the defence of the north, received various commissions of array, which reflected the government's knowledge that King Edward was equipping a Burgundian-backed fleet in order to re-invade. Montagu was to raise men from all across the north. On 14 March 1471, King Edward landed at Ravenspur, on the coast of Yorkshire; he had intended to land in East Anglia, but this had been established as being unsafe. Montagu, it has been suggested, could have "snuffed out" Edward's army almost immediately had he moved fast enough. Montagu was in Pontefract Castle as Edward passed by (where even his castle bailiff deserted him for the returning king, taking the castle's funds with him). Montagu's army, composed of local militias, was probably in the region of several thousand men, between 6,000 and 7,000, and increased as he trailed Edward south. Montagu arrived at Coventry, where the Earl of Warwick was camped, in early April 1471; this was probably the day after Clarence had defected back to his brother Edward, and taken his army with him.

=== Battle of Barnet Heath ===
By 12 April 1471, Montagu, with his brother Warwick and the Duke of Exeter, the Earl of Oxford, and Viscount Beaumont were approaching London with their army.

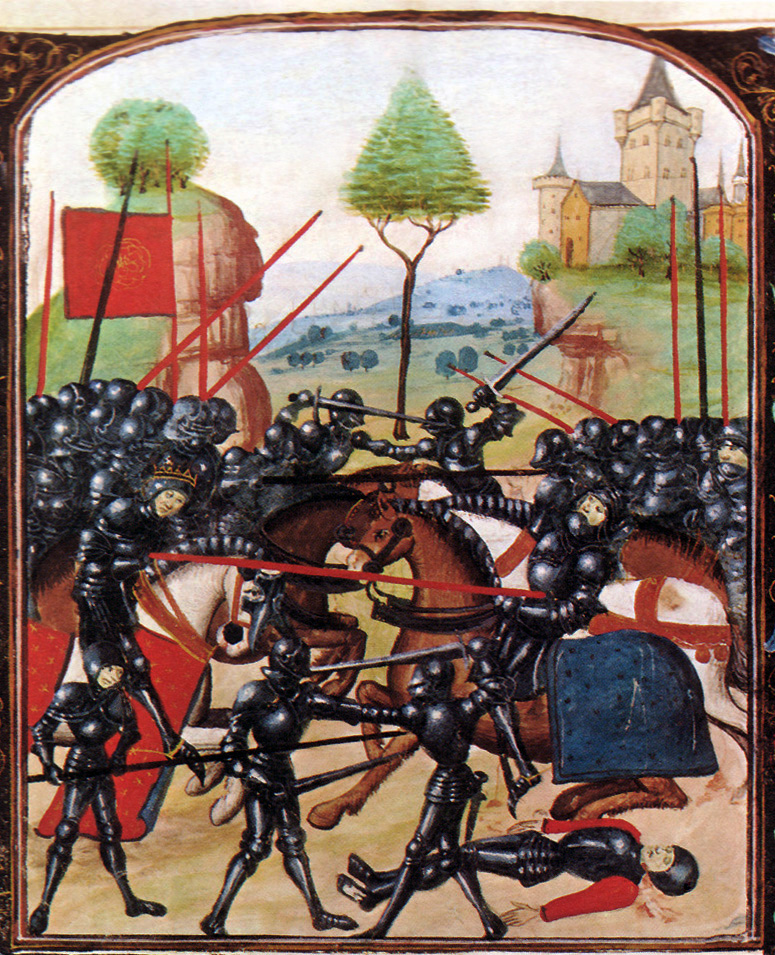
Battle of Barnet, as depicted on a 15th-century Ghent manuscript

Edward, having arrived in London on 11 April and been reunited with his queen, met Montagu and Warwick a few miles north of London, outside the village of Barnet. It is possible that he commanded a smaller army, perhaps of only 9,000 men, and probably no more than 14,000.

The battle on 14 April was a "confused affair" and fought in fog. It has been suggested that it was Montagu who persuaded Warwick to fight on foot at Barnet, leaving the horses tethered at the rear, in order to demonstrate their commitment to the cause by taking the same risks as the common soldier. Montagu probably controlled the central section of Warwick's army, facing Edward's own section, on the Great North Road from Barnet to St. Albans. Warkworth's Chronicle states that Warwick had an army of 20,000 men and that the battle beginning at 0400, lasted until ten o'clock that morning. Contemporaries have favourably described Montagu's martial skill at Barnet. Philippe de Commines called him "a very courageous knight," and the Burgundian observer Jean de Waurin wrote that, in the thick of the fighting, Montagu was "cutting off arms and heads like a hero of romance."

The Earl of Oxford, commanding the right wing of the Neville army, broke the opposing Yorkist line, under William, Lord Hastings, early in the battle. Oxford's men proceeded to chase the fleeing soldiers, and ended up looting away from the battlefield. Oxford managed to regroup his men, but, returning to the battlefield, as James Ross has put it, "disaster struck". In the time he and his force had been absent, the line of battle had shifted almost ninety degrees, so instead of returning to attack Edward's rear, he crashed into Montagu's section. The fog prevented identification, and Oxford's men fought with Montagu's. Montagu may, one chronicler suggests, have mistakenly seen Oxford's "Streaming star" banner as the king's "Sunne in splendour," and thus believe that the Earl had gone over to York. Recently though, one historian has pointed out that, in fact, Oxford had never previously used such a cognizance, and it was more prosaically just a case of men confused by fog.

At some point, possibly around this time, Montagu was killed; he was certainly dead before his brother. The Arrivall chronicler states this occurred "in plain battle," and in the thick of the fighting, rather than in the rout that later followed.

== Aftermath ==
The bodies of Warwick and Montagu were laid out "on the morrow after" and "openly shewed and naked" in St. Paul's, to prevent rumour stating that they had in fact survived the battle; Warkworth too said that the King personally directed this, and arranged for the corpses "to be put in a cart ... to be laid in the church of Paul's, on the pavement, that every man might see them; and so they lay for three or four days" before granting permission to their brother George for their burial at Bisham Priory.

== Issue ==
By his wife Isabel Ingoldsthorpe (c.1441–1476), daughter and heiress of Sir Edmund Ingaldsthorpe (d.1456) of Burrough Green and Sawston, Cambridgeshire (who survived him and remarried, on 25 April 1472 (as his second wife), to Sir William Norreys of Yattendon), he had a son and five daughters:

- George Neville, Duke of Bedford (c. 1461–1483), eldest son and heir. It appears that Montagu had wanted to marry George to Anne Holland, heiress of Henry Holland, 3rd Duke of Exeter; however by 1466 she had already married Thomas Grey, 1st Marquess of Dorset . He died without issue, having been stripped of his dukedom in 1478.
- Anne Neville, eldest daughter, who married Sir William Stonor of Stonor in Pyrton, Oxfordshire, a grandson of William de la Pole, 1st Duke of Suffolk.
- Elizabeth Neville, who married firstly Thomas Scrope, 6th Baron Scrope of Masham, a dedicated Yorkist, and secondly Sir Henry Wentworth of Nettlestead.
- Margaret Neville, who married firstly Sir John Mortimer (died before 12 November 1504), only son of Sir Hugh Mortimer and Eleanor Cornwall; secondly Charles Brandon, 1st Duke of Suffolk (marriage annulled 1507), and thirdly Robert Downes, Gentleman.
- Lucy Neville (died 1534), who married firstly Sir Thomas FitzWilliam of Aldwark, North Yorkshire, and secondly Sir Anthony Browne. After 1485, her loyalty to the Tudors was always deeply suspect, and she was noted in official reports as "one who loves not the King (Henry VII)".
- Isabel Neville, who married firstly Sir William Huddleston of Millom, Cumberland (an important regional family and old allies of the Nevilles), and secondly Sir William Smythe of Elford in Staffordshire.

=== Arms ===
Montagu took for his crest "a griffin issuing from a ducal crown". His coat of arms was the Neville "Gules a saltire argent" with a label "gobony argent and azure crescent" for differencing, as a younger son, being a reference to the arms of Beaufort (Neville arms with label compony of Beaufort, borne as a difference to the paternal Neville arms (Gules, a saltire argent) by the descendants of the second marriage of Ralph Neville, 1st Earl of Westmorland (d.1425) to Joan Beaufort, a legitimised daughter of John of Gaunt, 4th son of King Edward III). This coat, when he was made Marquis of Montagu, was later augmented with further quarterings.

== Notes ==
Peerage of England
Preceded by Alice Montacute	Baron Montagu; 1461 – 25 March 1470	Extinct
New creation	Marquess of Montagu; 25 March 1470 – 14 April 1471	Extinct
Vacant Title last held by Henry Percy, 3rd Earl as holder until 1461	Earl of Northumberland; 27 May 1464 – 25 March 1470	Succeeded by Henry Percy, 4th Earl
