= Isabelle Thompson =

Hawaiian-American teacher and politician (1891 – 1946)

Isabelle Namauʻu Thompson

Member of the Hawaii Territorial House of Representatives representing Maui County
- In office 1945 – June 11, 1946

Personal details
- Born: Isabelle Namauʻu; May 17, 1891; Lahaina, Hawaii
- Died: June 11, 1946 (aged 55); Kihei, Hawaii
- Spouse: Charles Thompson
- Children: 4

Isabelle Namauʻu Thompson (May 17, 1891 – June 11, 1946) was a Hawaiian-American teacher and politician. Born in Lahaina, Hawaii, she represented Maui County in the Hawaii Territorial House of Representatives beginning in 1945, but was ill for much of her term. She died of an intracerebral hemorrhage in 1946 before the term concluded.

== Early life ==
Isabell Namauʻu (Note: Some contemporary sources have her maiden name as Namau, but later sources agree on Namauʻu; this difference in orthography is typical for similar names.) was born in Lahaina, Hawaii, on May 17, 1891.

Namauʻu sang at the annual meeting of the Hawaiian Girls' Club in May 1919. On June 25, 1921, a farewell party was held at the Kula Sanitarium for Namauʻu and a colleague, who were both leaving the sanitarium. In July and August 1921, Namauʻu sang Hawaiian music at the daily assemblies of the territory's summer school, which was held at McKinley High School.

On December 19, 1921, Namauʻu married prominent rancher Charles Thompson at her home in Lahaina. The couple travelled to Hana to celebrate. At the time of the marriage, Namauʻu was a teacher at the Episcopal School in Lahaina and had previously taught in Kula. She was Thompson's third wife; they had four children together.

== Career and death ==
Thompson was elected as a Democrat to represent Maui County in the Hawaii Territorial House of Representatives for a term beginning in 1945. She was unwell for most of her term, and only intermittently present in the legislature.

On June 11, 1946, Thompson died of a sudden intracerebral hemorrhage at her home in Kihei. She was 55 years old. Because there were no legislative sessions scheduled before the next general election that November, her seat remained vacant through the end of the term.
