= Izabela Wagner =

American cognitive scientist

- Born: Izabela Wagner; 3 November 1964 (age 61); Wołów, near Wrocław, Poland
- Citizenship: Polish and French
- Spouse: Philippe Saffray (m. 1987)
- Children: 2
- Scientific career
- Fields: Sociology; Ethnography; Music education
- Institutions: Université Paris-Cité - URMIS - ICM Paris - Collegium Civitas Cooperative - University of Warsaw
- Thesis: La production sociale de violonistes virtuoses (2006)
- Doctoral advisor: Jean-Michel Chapoulie
- Doctoral students: Beata Kowalczyk (2018) - Mariusz Finkelstein (2019)
- Website: www.izabelawagner.com

Izabela Wagner-Saffray (born 3 November 1964) is a Polish-born European sociologist. Wagner was awarded the scientific title of Professor Belwederski by the President of the Republic of Poland in May 2023 and has been a full professor at Université Paris Cité since September 1, 2023. Wagner has been an associate professor at the Institute of Sociology at Collegium Civitas in Warsaw from December 2019 to August 2023. She is also a member of URMIS (Unité de Recherche Migrations et Société) Fellow at ICM (Institut Convergence Migration) in Paris since 2019. Her sociological research is concerned with migrations, exil of scientists, intellectuals, musicians (violin virtuosos). Wagner's contributions are also focused on the careers of artists and intellectuals, professional socialization and geographic mobility, migrations and forced-migrations.

== Early life and education ==
Wagner was born on 3 November 1964 in Wołów, Poland, in a family of musicians (her father, Juliusz Karcz, is a compositor and her mother a music schools inspector). She began studying sociology at the School for Advanced Studies in the Social Sciences (EHESS) in Paris in 1996, and completed her Ph.D. there in 2006, defending the dissertation La production sociale de violonistes virtuoses ("Social Production of Virtuosos)" with Jean-Michel Chapoulie as her thesis advisor.

== Scientific work ==
Wagner worked at the musical academia as a Jaques-Dalcroze method specialist, as assistant professor at the University of Music in Poznań, Poland in 1986–87, and at the Conservatory of Music in Nanterre, France in 1988 - 2001. Later since 2008 she worked at the Institute of Sociology - University of Warsaw.

Within the field of sociological research, Wagner's contributions are focused on the careers of artists and intellectuals, professional socialization and geographic mobility, migrations and forced-migrations. Linking history with sociology she wrote about antisemitism in Europe in 20th and 21st centuries.

Wagner did sociological research mainly in Europe but also in the US and China. She was a visiting scholar at Harvard (2010/2011), at the New School for Social Research in New York City (2016), at UC Davis (2023, USA), a visiting professor at Fudan University (2012, Shangai - China). Wagner's monographs have appeared in Chinese, English, Polish, Portuguese, Spanish, German and Russian.

Wagner's research activity addresses Migrations, Forced Migrations, Musicology, Ethnomusicology, Composition, Music Education, Global Jazz Studies, Music Industry, Music Performance, and Music Performance Studies.

== Publications ==
- My Life in Fragments Editing and analysis of Zygmunt Bauman's private texts (Polity Press, 2023)
- Becoming Transnational Professional: Kariery I Mobilność Polskich Elit Naukowych [Careers and mobility of Polish scientific elites] (in Polish, Wydawnictwo Naukowe Scholar, 2011): the introduction recounts how Wagner has immersed herself in the world of scientists, labs, experiments. She considers the correlation between the scientist's symptoms of talent at an early age and their success as adults.
- Producing Excellence: The Making of Virtuosos (Rutgers Press, 2015) (Wiley, 2020): Wagner spent many years in close contact with several musical prodigies, producing this long-lasting ethnographical study. The monograph was featured among the top ten in China (2016).
- Bauman: A Biography (Polity Press, 2020): Zygmunt Bauman and Wagner shared a Polish background but represent different sociological schools.
