= Izabella Kuliffay =

Hungarian composer

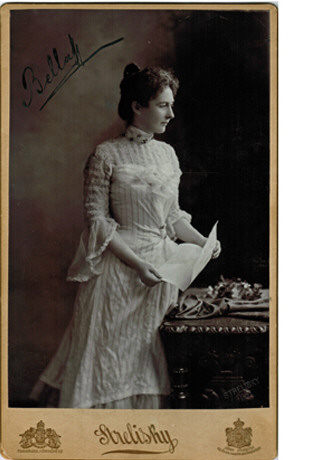
Kuliffay Izabella, b. 1863

Izabella Kuliffay (29 December 1863 – 19 January 1945) was a Hungarian pianist and composer. She was born in Pest, and studied music at the National Conservatory in Budapest from 1877–79, and the Budapest Academy of Music from 1879–83, with teachers including Kornel Abranyi and Gyula Erkel. Her work was also heavily influenced by Franz Liszt.

After completing her studies, Kuliffay taught music in Budapest. She was vice-president of the Hungarian Women’s Choral Union and founded a school for girls. She died in Budapest.

== Works ==
Selected works include:

- Magyar suite (zongorán a szerző)
