= Isabelle Peretz =

Canadian psychologist

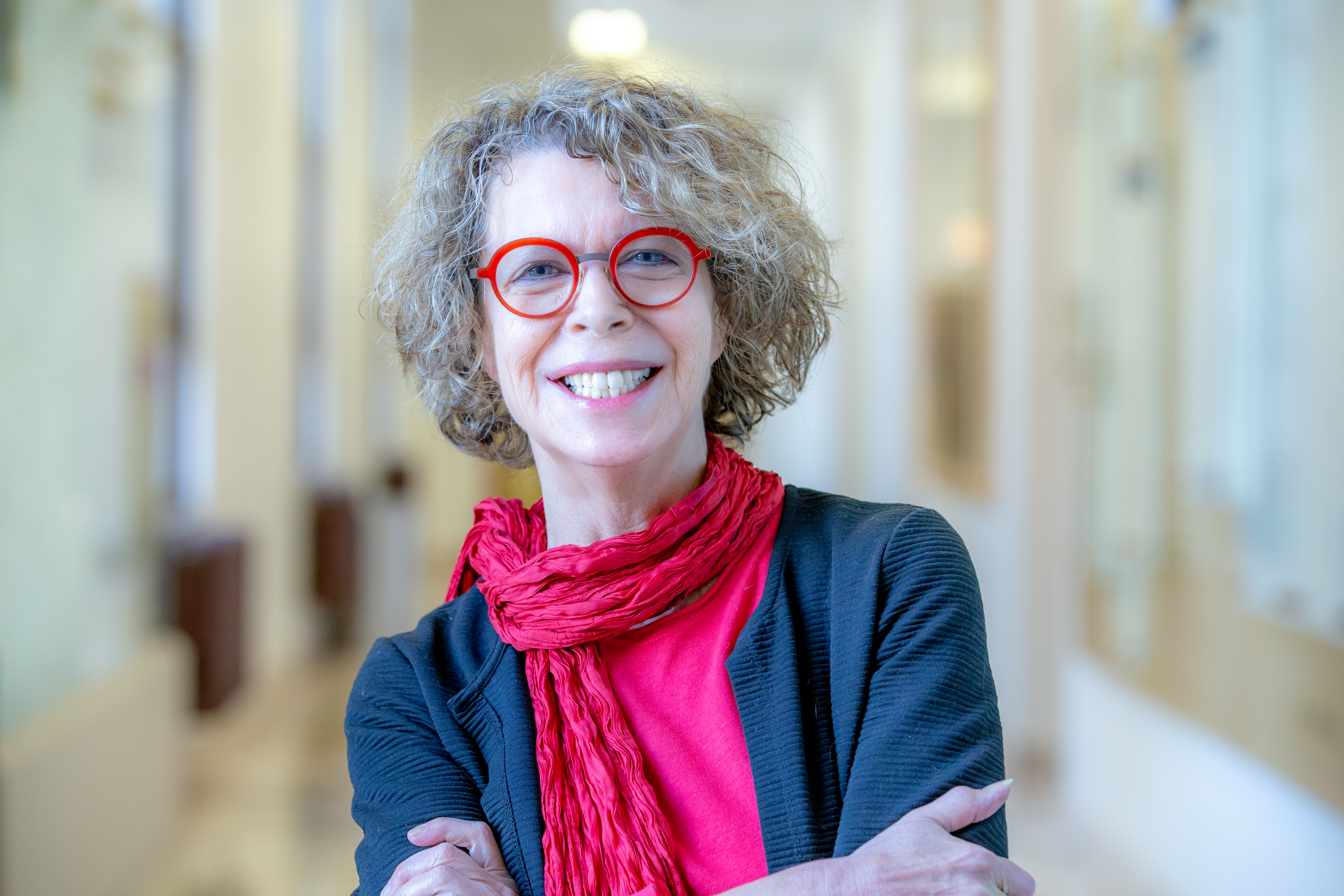

Academic background
- Education: PhD, Université libre de Bruxelles

Isabelle Peretz CM OQ FRSC (born 1956) is a professor of psychology at the University of Montreal, holding a Canada Research Chair and Casavant Chair in neurocognition of music. She specializes in music cognition, focusing on congenital and acquired musical disorders (amusia) and on the cognitive and biological foundations of music processing in general.

== Education ==
Peretz was educated in Brussels, Belgium, and she earned her Ph.D. in experimental psychology at the Université libre de Bruxelles in 1984, after which she accepted a faculty position at the University of Montreal.

== Career ==
In 2005, Peretz became the founding co-director of the international laboratory for Brain, Music, and Sound research (BRAMS), a multi-university consortium that is jointly affiliated with McGill University and the Université de Montréal. She is also a chief editor of the journal section Frontiers in Auditory Cognitive Neuroscience.

Peretz was elected a fellow of the Royal Society of Canada in 2008. In 2018, she was appointed an Officer of the Order of Quebec. The following year, she was the appointed a member of the Order of Canada.

== Selected works ==
- Peretz, Isabelle; Zatorre, Robert J., eds. (2003). The Cognitive Neuroscience of Music. Oxford: Oxford University Press. ISBN 978-0-19-852519-6.
