= Isabelle Wéry =

Belgian actress and writer

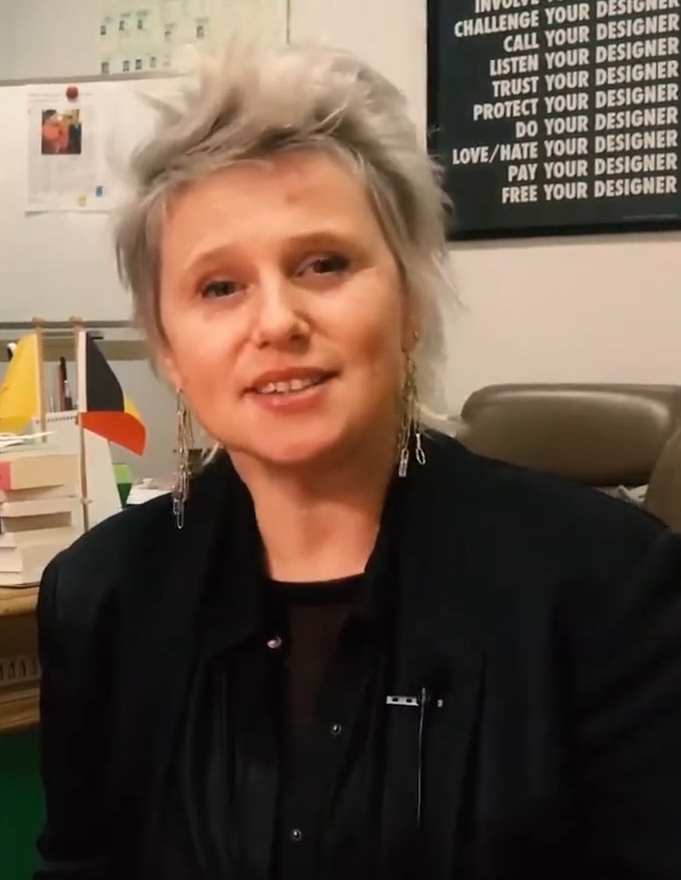
Isabelle Wéry in 2018

Isabelle Wéry is a Belgian actress and award-winning writer.

Wéry was born in Liège. She studied theatre in INSAS, where she was graduated in 1991. René Hainaux was her teacher. She has performed in several theatres from France, Belgium, Italy and the UK. Her monologues in Les Monologues du vagin by Eve Ensler were very successful. She was nominated two following years to the Prix du Théâtre in the category Seul en scène (1998 and 1999). She has appeared in both musical and film media.

In 2013, she won the European Union Prize for Literature (Belgium) for her work Marilyn Désossée.
