= Isabella Belfer =

Israeli kidnapper

Isabella Belfer (Hebrew: איזבלה בלפר) is a sixty-nine-year-old Russian-born Israeli woman convicted of kidnapping in Israel and was the oldest person incarcerated in Israel, until she was granted a pardon in 2010. Her case was made famous through RT, an English language Russian news service, while the Israeli media paid little attention to the case.

== Capture ==
Belfer returned to Israel in 2006 to assist her ailing mother. Rottem located her and pressed kidnapping charges. Belfer was arrested and put on trial for kidnapping.

== Trial ==
Before her trial, Belfer suffered a mild heart attack and had to undergo surgery. Belfer's defense claimed that she was too old to survive prison conditions and would die even if sentenced to one day. She herself expressed worry about going to prison. She had stated that she wondered how long she could survive in prison. Despite claims that she was too old, she was found guilty of kidnapping on January 27, 2008 and sentenced to six years in prison by Judge Oded Mudric, who in the sentencing, stated that Belfer was guilty of "causing fatal [emotional] injuries by not allowing [Yaron Rottem] to be a parent". Michael Yarnin, her lawyer, attempted to overturn the sentence by appealing to the Supreme Court of Israel, but this proved unsuccessful. Her lawyer began trying to obtain a pardon from Israeli president Shimon Peres. After serving her first six months, an Israeli court reduced Belfer's term to three years in prison. After the trial concluded, Belfer was deeply distressed and stated that she felt weak both morally and physically.
