= Isabel Zapata =

Mexican writer (born 1984)

- Born: Isabel Zapata Morales; 1984 (age 41–42); Mexico City, Mexico
- Education: Autonomous Technological Institute of Mexico; New School for Social Research
- Occupations: Writer, editor, and translator

Isabel Zapata (born 1984) is a Mexican writer, editor, poet, and translator. She is the author of Ventanas adentro, Las noches son así, Una ballena es un país, Alberca vacía, In vitro, Tres animales que caben en el agua, and Troika. She has also published in literary magazines such as Periódico de Poesía, Letras Libres, and Este País. In 2015, she co-founded the publishing house Ediciones Antílope.

== Background and career ==
Born in Mexico City, Isabel Zapata is the daughter of the former governor of San Luis Potosí, Fausto Zapata. She spoke on behalf of her family when they donated her father's book collection to the Autonomous University of San Luis Potosí in 2016. She earned a bachelor's degree in political science from the Autonomous Technological Institute of Mexico and a master's degree in philosophy from the New School for Social Research in New York.

From 2013 to 2015, she was the cultural programs coordinator for the Mexican Cultural Institute in New York. In 2015, she co-founded Ediciones Antílope with Marina Azahua, Jazmina Barrera, Astrid López Méndez, and César Tejeda; Dora Navarrete is also currently part of the team. After returning to Mexico, she has been involved in film festivals, such as the Ambulante Film Festival and the Morelia International Film Festival.

== Selected works ==
=== Una ballena es un país ===
In 2019, she published Una ballena es un país (A Whale is a Country), a collection of poems. The poems reflect her views regarding animals. Zapata writes about her empathy for other living beings and writes that she considers animals "for what they are and not for what they are and not for their usefulness" to humans.

=== In vitro ===
In 2021, she published In Vitro, a novelistic essay in which she reflects on motherhood and pregnancy. This work includes autobiographical accounts of her own experience with the reproduction process.

=== Troika ===
In 2024, she published Troika, her first novel, which is 200 pages long. The synopsis of the novel mentions that it is an "exploration of the affections and bonds we create to secure our passage through the world".

== List of works ==
Year	Title	Publisher	Location	Genre	ISBN	Notes
2002	Ventanas adentro	Urdimbre	Mexico	Poetry	ISBN 978-968-5601-02-3	
2018	Las noches son así	Broken English		Poetry		Digital Book
2019	Alberca vacía / Empty Pool	Argonautica	Mexico	Essay	ISBN 978-607-97572-8-1	Bilingual Edition
2019	Una ballena es un país	Almadía	Mexico	Poetry	ISBN 978-607-8667-05-5	
2021	In vitro	Almadía	Mexico	Essay	ISBN 978-607-8764-63-1	
2022	Maneras de desaparecer	Excursiones	Mexico	Essay	ISBN 978-987-47626-2-7	
2023	Tres animales que caben en el agua	Almadía	Mexico	Children's	ISBN 978-607-8764-03-7	
2024	Troika	Almadía	Mexico	Novel	ISBN 978-84-126900-5-7	

== Translations ==
=== Into Spanish ===
- Julia de Burgos: La creación de un ícono puertorriqueño (Becoming Julia de Burgos: The Making of a Puerto Rican Icon). University of Illinois Press, 2022. ISBN 978-0-252-08619-9.
- Los peces no existen: Una fábula contemporánea sobre cómo vivir sin etiquetas (Why Fish Don’t Exist: A Story of Loss, Love, and the Hidden Order of Life). Seix Barral, 2024. ISBN 978-84-322-4333-2.
