= Isabel Ingoldisthorpe =

English noblewoman (1441–1476)

- Countess of Northumberland; Marchioness of Montagu; Lady Norreys
- Born: 1441
- Died: 20 May 1476 (aged 34–35)
- Buried: Bisham Abbey
- Spouses: John Neville, 1st Marquess of Montagu (m. 1457; died 1471) Sir William Norreys (m. 1472)
- Issue: George Neville, Duke of Bedford; Anne Neville; Elizabeth Neville; Margaret Neville; Lucy Neville; Isabel Neville

Isabel Ingoldisthorpe (1441 – 20 May 1476) was an English noblewoman and heiress, who by her marriage to John Neville, 1st Marquess of Montagu was Countess of Northumberland and Marchioness of Montague.

== Early life ==
Isabel Ingoldisthorpe was born in 1441 and was the daughter of Joan (Note: Some sources refer to her mother as Jane) Tiptoft and Sir Edmund Ingoldesthorpe (1420–1457). Her mother Joan was the sister and eventual heir of John Tiptoft, 1st Earl of Worcester. When her father died in 1456, she was his sole heir and inherited his fortune and various properties around the country. Queen Margaret of Anjou then took custody of Ingoldisthorpe and control of her properties and wealth.

== First marriage ==
On 24 April 1457, Ingoldisthorpe married 27-year-old John Neville, a younger son of Richard Neville, 5th Earl of Salisbury, at Canterbury Cathedral, with their marriage later celebrated by the Archbishop of Canterbury. As Margaret of Anjou was her legal guardian, she had to give permission before any marriage could occur. The queen insisted that the ceremony be fully paid for before permission was granted. The couple later petitioned Parliament in 1460 to receive control of Ingoldisthorpe's properties. Together, they had five daughters and one son.

Her husband was made Earl of Northumberland on 27 May 1464, making Ingoldisthorpe the Countess of Northumberland. Six years later, she became the Marchioness of Montagu when her husband was granted the title Marquess of Montagu on 25 March 1470.

On 14 April 1471, John Neville and his brother Richard Neville, 16th Earl of Warwick, were killed in battle at the Battle of Barnet. In the aftermath of the battle, their bodies were taken and displayed at St Paul's Cathedral.

== Second marriage ==
After she was widowed, King Edward IV made provisions for her, allowing her to own her own and her husband's property, as well as giving her wardship of her son George. The king also arranged for her to marry one of his body squires, William Norreys, whom she married on the first anniversary of John Neville's death on 14 April 1472. She and Norreys soon faced financial difficulties despite their wealth. They had to ask Ingoldisthorpe's mother, Joan, for assistance. To help them pay their £1,000 debt to the tailor William Parker, she agreed to sign over several of her properties to him until the debt was cleared.

== Death ==
Four years after her remarriage, Ingoldisthorpe died on 20 May 1476. She was buried with her first husband at Bisham Abbey. Her daughter Elizabeth later commissioned a tomb to be built over their grave.

== Sources ==
- Clark, K. L. (7 September 2016). The Nevills of Middleham. History Press. ISBN 9780750969550.
