= Isobel Loutit =

Canadian mathematician, educator, inventor

Isobel St. Clair Loutit (July 18, 1909 – April 19, 2009) was a Canadian mathematician, educator, inventor, and statistician. She was "one of the first women, if not the first, to work professionally as a statistician in Canada", and she was recognized as an honorary member of the Statistical Society of Canada.

== Early life and education ==
Loutit was born in Selkirk, Manitoba, one of seven children. Her father, Peter Robert Loutit (1878–1961), was a school teacher and principal, of Scottish descent. She earned a bachelor's degree in mathematics in 1929 from the University of Manitoba, with a minor in French, one of four women to earn a mathematics degree that year. One of her professors there, Lloyd A. H. Warren, taught her statistics. She also studied probability, numerical analysis, least squares, and actuarial science.

== Career ==
Faced with a choice between becoming a teacher, nurse, or secretary, the only career alternatives available at that time to women, Loutit chose to be a teacher. The male teachers at the schools she taught at were given priority for the mathematics classes, so she ended up teaching French, with occasional roles as a substitute mathematics teacher. She remained a school teacher from 1929 to 1942.

After learning of the deaths of several of her former students in World War II, Loutit signed up for an engineering job advertised to women with technical degrees, to replace the men who had gone abroad as soldiers. Although officially employed by the government, she began working with Vernon Oswald Marquez at Northern Electric, to help develop an anti-aircraft targeting device. Marquez requested that she be transferred to Northern Electric more permanently, and she became an employee in 1943, appointed as an engineer despite her lack of engineering training in order to allow her to be paid beyond the women's salary scale.

After the war, Loutit worked as a statistician for Northern Electric, at first in the telephone division and later in the wire and cable division, specializing in data analysis and quality control. She was promoted to Department Chief in 1966, becoming the first woman to take a management position in the company.

== Other activities ==
While working at Northern Electric, Loutit became involved in the Montréal Section of the American Society for Quality Control, including chairing a one-day meeting on quality control in 1961 and the first Canadian Regional Conference of the society in 1966. At the 1961 meeting, she gave a lunchtime speech in French, "the first official use of French by this professional society". She was elected chair of the section in 1969.

In her retirement, Loutit wrote several pieces on the local history of Montreal and Compton County, Quebec before returning to Winnipeg in 1989.

== Recognition ==
Loutit became an honorary member of the Statistical Society of Canada in 2009. The Business and Industrial Statistics Section of the Society also offers an annual lecture, the Isobel Loutit Invited Address, in her memory.
