= Joan Hore =

Australian politician (1890–1955)

- Born: Joan Mary Hore; 12 August 1890; Bedford, United Kingdom
- Died: 20 July 1955 (aged 64); Devonport, Tasmania

Ecclesiastical career
- Religion: Congregationalist
- Church: Congregational Union of Australia
- Ordained: 28 May 1931

Joan Mary Hore (1890–1955) was the first ordained woman minister in New South Wales. She was ordained at the Bethany Congregational Church in Speers Point on 28 July 1931 to the Congregational Union of Australia (now part of the Uniting Church in Australia). Rev. Hore became the second ordained woman in Australia.

On 21 October, 1931, The Sydney Morning Herald reported "The Rev. Joan Hore, who was received at the session of the Congregational Union yesterday, is probably the first woman preacher of any denomination ordained in New South Wales. She preaches at Speer's Point, Islington, and Beresfield, three widely separated churches in the Newcastle district."

== Personal life ==
Joan Mary Hore was born in Bedford, England, on 12 August 1890, to Edward Coode Hore who was a missionary, explorer, mariner and shipbuilder and his wife Annie née Boyle. Both were associated with the London Missionary Society (LMS). Joan had one sibling, Jack (b. 1882) who was the first white child to visit Lake Tanganyika. Jack fell ill and he died in London (April 1889).

The family moved to Tasmania (1890) when Joan was 10 years of age, where she was home schooled in her primary years and in her secondary years at Leslie House School, now known as The Friends' School, Hobart. In 1908, Joan completed her schooling with honours and won a scholarship to the University of Tasmania.

At the University of Tasmania (1911–1914) Joan studied mathematics, Latin, English and History. While an undergraduate she was Secretary of the Women's University Union in 1913. From the history of the Tasmania University Union 1899 -1999: "A Law Students' Association had been formed; debating flourished, with Joan Hore described as 'the finest lady debater ever'." She graduated on 30 March 1914, Joan had set her eyes upon teaching.

Records show that Joan taught in Sydney at Redlands' Girls College, Cremorne, NSW and, during the 1920s, she had two short missionary placements, one in India and the second in Fiji. In both instances her service was shortened by illness.

After her teaching and missionary service, Joan Hore set her sights on becoming an ordained Christian Minister. It wasn't a straightforward path as, in Australia, the Congregational Union was the only Protestant church to provide a pathway for women into the ministry. Winifred Kiek was ordained on 13 June 1927 as minister of Colonel Light Gardens Congregational Church in Adelaide, South Australia. Rev. Kiek, was a pioneer, as the "first woman minister in a Christian church and in a dominion of the British Empire."

Rev. Hore's ministry in the Newcastle, NSW area coincided with The Great Depression and she was well known in the district for her work with the unemployed. She visited shanty camps, taking donated food and groceries, clothing, reading matter, and gifts and cake on Christmas Day. Joan also publicly spoke out in support of the rights of the unemployed and was much admired by them.

Her advocacy for the unemployed led to problems with her church committees at both Islington and Beresfield. After leaving Newcastle N.S.W. area Rev. Hore served the Congregational Church at West Epping (a western suburb of Sydney) and back in Tasmania at Devonport Congregational Church (1942 - 46) and then with Devonport Methodist Church (1947 - 54).

Julia Pitman outlines the history of involvement of women in the Congregational Church in Australia and she profiles the thirteen women ordained in the period 1927 – 1977, including Rev Joan Hore, in 'Our principle of sex equality': the ordination of women in the Congregational church in Australia 1927–1977, ISBN 978-1-925333-52-7

Joan died of heart disease at Devonport on 20 July 1955.
