= Isabel McCorkindale =

Australian temperance worker and women's activist (1885–1971)

Isabel McCorkindale MBE
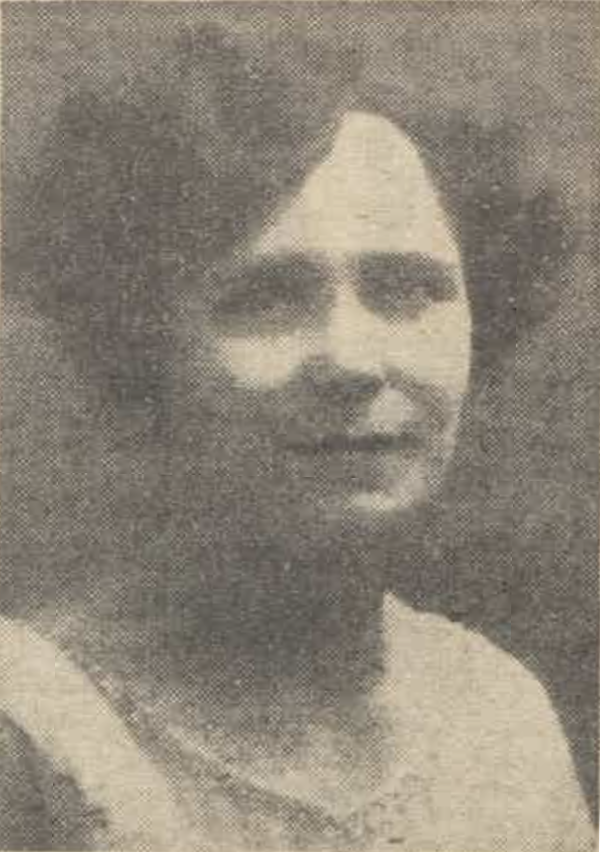
- McCorkindale in 1934
- Born: 5 January 1885; Rutherglen, Lanarkshire, Scotland
- Died: 24 February 1971 (aged 86); Brisbane, Queensland, Australia
- Other names: Isabel McCorkindale
- Occupation: Temperance advocate
- Years active: 1920s-1960s
- Known for: Leader in Women's Christian Temperance Union in Australia and globally
- Notable work: The Frances Willard Centenary Book

Isabella McCorkindale MBE (1885–1971), known as Isabel McCorkindale, was a Scottish-born Australian temperance, women's suffrage and women's rights activist. She was a leader in both the Women's Christian Temperance Union of Australasia (WCTUA) and the World Women's Christian Temperance Union (WWCTU). As director of scientific temperance education for the WCTUA, she spent more than 40 years working to educate young people about the health and social consequences of alcohol abuse. She was international president of WWCTU from 1959 to 1962, after serving as vice-president from 1947 to 1959. She then served as national president for the Australian WCTU from 1963 to 1966. In 1961, she was appointed a Member of the Order of the British Empire for her work.

== Early life and education ==
Isabella McCorkindale was born on 5 January 1885 in Rutherglen, a town located three miles south-east of Glasgow in Scotland. Her parents were Archibald and Barbara McCorkindale; she was the couple's first child. When Isabella was only one year old, her parents emigrated to Brisbane, Queensland, Australia. It was here that Isbella spent her childhood and early adulthood. She was a life-long member of the Methodist Church.

She attended the Junction Park State School, located in the Brisbane suburb of Annerley, which is part of the traditional lands of the Turrbal and Jagera people. After completing her secondary education, she attended a business college.

Between 1924 and 1927, she studied at the University of Edmonton, during a tour abroad.

== Career ==
McCorkindale was active in the Women's Christian Temperance Union, an international organization of temperance advocates, who also addressed other related social concerns of women. Originally founded in the US in 1874, under the leadership of its second president, Frances Willard, the WCTU grew to become the largest women's organisation and most influential politically in the United States.

In 1883, an international organisation was established, the World's Woman's Christian Temperance Union. Influential in Britain, and later in many Commonwealth countries, the WWCTU served as a clearinghouse for information on temperance and related issues, and served as a network connecting women temperance advocates from countries around the globe.

The first WCTU branch in Australia was established in Sydney, New South Wales, in 1882. Additional branches were founded in other states in 1885, due to the influence of Mary Greenleaf Clement Leavitt, an American temperance advocate and WCTU leader who toured Australia that year. A national federation of Australia's many regional unions was established in 1891, and named the Woman's Christian Temperance Union of Australasia or WCTUA.

A main priority of the W.C.T.U was temperance, which was a movement to oppose the sale and use of alcohol because of its deleterious effects on individuals, the family and society. However, the organization also addressed itself to related issues that its women leaders felt were important to address for the improvement of society. These included support for women's suffrage, labor laws protecting women workers, and public health initiatives.

By the time of McCorkindale's involvement in the organization, women had won suffrage at the state and national level. The organization continued to push for laws limiting the sale of alcohol, reducing hours of pubs, and advocating against the use of alcohol as well as drugs on a personal level.

McCorkindale began her participation in the Australian WCTU in the Queensland branch in 1911, at age 26. She first took a leadership role on their anti-gambling committee, serving as an associate, and then took on the role of the main WCTU organizer for Queensland, which meant she travelled across the state to help the organization grow. By 1917, she was the organizing secretary for the Queensland branch.

Her leadership skills were valued by others outside the WCTU, and from 1920 to 1924, she volunteered with the regional alliance of temperance organizations, the Queensland Temperance Alliance, becoming the director of their women's section.

From 1924 to 1927, McCorkindale left Australia to travel abroad. She spent much of her time in England, Canada and the United States. She was a well-respected lecturer, and spent time on the lecture circuit with both the British Women's Temperance Association, in 1925, and the Canadian Temperance Federation, in 1926. She later mentioned that this time away helped deepen her own identity as an Australian.

Upon her return to Australia, McCorkindale became the director for scientific temperance education for the national Australian WCTU, a position she held from 1927 to 1956. She was dedicated to promoting scientific education about the effects of alcoholism, with a specific focus on reaching young adults. She travelled extensively during these years. She spent six months in New Zealand in 1929 to lead an educational campaign aimed at attracting young adults to the temperance movement.

She then returned to Australia where she toured widely in the 1930s, again focusing on attracting youth to the movement. She continued to focus on the discussion of science and public health, and spoke widely to gatherings of both men and women. In 1934, she was a delegate to the WWCTU conference held in Sweden, traveling with her colleague and fellow delegate Ada Bromham.

In addition to being a speaker and organizer, McCorkindale was a writer and editor. For the centenary of Frances Willard's birth, in 1939, she authored a biography of Willard, entitled The Frances Willard Centenary Book. She also edited a collection of essays about the history of the WCTU, published in 1948 as Pioneer Pathways. That same year, McCorkindale also became the editor of the Australian WCTU's newspaper, known as the White Ribbon Signal. In 1949, she edited a third book of WCTU history, entitled the Torch Bearers: The Women's Christian Temperance Union of South Australia 1886-1948.

In 1947, McCorkindale was elected vice-president of the World Women's Christian Temperance Union. She served in this position for eleven years, until 1959, when she became the international president. She served as international president for four years. Following this, she served as the national president of the Australia WCTU from 1963 to 1966.

== Views on temperance ==
McCorkindale was known for approaching the issue of temperance from a scientific and rational approach, and in her speaking she highlighted the health consequences of alcoholism and alcohol consumption, rather than using moral arguments. She believed that educating young adults about the problems associated with alcohol use and abuse would be a more effective way to garner support for the temperance cause than moralizing. In 1948, for example, she published a paper entitled "Teaching Scientific Temperance". In taking this approach, she was part of a wider movement within temperance circles, known as Scientific Temperance.

McCorkindale travelled extensively in her temperance activities, focusing especially on developing educational programs and lecturing to youth. She was described in a newspaper article as "lucid in the presentation of facts, and aims at imparting the latest scientific truths concerning alcohol."

Believing that young adults should make up their own minds about alcohol, she established discussion groups and reading circles, where young adults could read and discuss literature about the issue. As an example of her dedication to the cause and her rigorous travel schedule, she spent six months in New Zealand establishing an educational program aimed at youth and young adults. Similarly, she set up programs in Australia, as when she traveled to Queensland for a three-month tour in 1933, visiting dozens of towns.

While McCorkindale focused on temperance in her work, she also addressed topics such as gambling, women's role in politics, peace and international relations. She saw all these issues as interconnected. In Toowoomba, she presented an address entitled "The Citizenship Challenge of the 20th Century to Youth", which touched on the need of youth to look to the future and to be physically and mentally fit to be leaders.

She was a supporter of the "Rainbow Campaign" of the Australian WCTU, which encompassed issues such as health, social justice, peace, temperance, citizenship, and aboriginal rights.

== Women's rights ==
In addition to being active in the temperance movement, McCorkindale was a staunch supporter of women's rights. In 1946, McCorkindale participated in advocacy efforts that led to the Australian Women's Charter. In 1950, she attended the gathering of the United Nations Commission on the Status of Women, held in New York, as one of the Australian delegates.

== Aboriginal Australian rights ==
During McCorkindale's time with the organisation, the WCTU in Australia made efforts to advocate for the rights of Aboriginal Australian and Torres Strait Islanders. These efforts have been criticised for being too patronising, and not dedicated enough to true equality. It is clear from her speeches that McCorkindale held biased racial views typical of her day. She is summarised in one paper as asserting that white Australians should lead by example so that other races would be encouraged to follow in the path of temperance. Like many white members of the WCTU, she spoke about Aboriginal Australians and people from other parts of the world with paternalism and expressed a sense of racial superiority, even as she was participating in efforts to advocate for basic rights for Aboriginal Australians as part of the WCTU platform.

== Honours ==
At the 1961 Queen's Birthday Honours, announced in June 1961, McCorkindale was appointed a Member of the Order of the British Empire. The citation, as announced in The London Gazette, read "[f]or services rendered in connection with temperance and women's organizations".

== Death ==
McCorkindale died at home in Queensland on 24 February 1971.

== Works ==
- McCorkindale, Isabel. The Frances Willard Centenary Book (1939).
- McCorkindale, Isabel, ed. Pioneer Pathways: Sixty years of citizenship (1948).
- McCorkindale, Isabel, ed. Torch Bearers: The Women's Christian Temperance Union of South Australia 1886-1948 (1949).
