= Isabelle Kridluar =

Inuk artist (1954–2018)

- Born: May 22, 1954
- Died: May 8, 2018 (aged 63)

Isabelle Kridluar (born 22 May 1954 – 8 May 2018) was an Inuk artist who lived by Repulse Bay, Nunavut, Canada.

Her work is included in the collections of the National Gallery of Canada and the Musée national des beaux-arts du Québec.

== Selected works ==
- Man and Woman Fishing, 1982
