= Isobelle =

Isobelle is a feminine given name. Notable people with the name include:

- Isobelle Carmody (born 1958), Australian writer
- Isobelle Ann Dods-Withers (1876–1939), Scottish artist
- Isobelle Mary Ferguson (1926–2019), Aboriginal Australian nurse and activist
- Isobelle Jones (born 2007), British runner
- Isobelle Molloy, English actress
