= Isabelle Lendl =

American golfer

Personal information
- Nationality: United States
- Born: July 29, 1991 (age 35) Greenwich, Connecticut, U.S.

Career
- Sport: Golf
- College: University of Florida
- Status: Amateur

Best results in LPGA major championships
- Chevron Championship: CUT: 2013
- Women's PGA C'ship: DNP
- U.S. Women's Open: DNP
- Women's British Open: DNP
- Evian Championship: DNP

Isabelle Lendl (born July 29, 1991) is an American amateur golfer. She finished second in the 2006 American Junior Golf Association girls standings. She ranked first in the Top Fives and was named a first team Rolex Junior All-American. Her father is Ivan Lendl, a member of the International Tennis Hall of Fame. She speaks two languages - Czech and English.

She was the youngest player to qualify for the 2004 U.S. Women's Amateur at the age of 12. She earned three AJGA tournament victories in 2006; the MCI Junior Heritage, Scott Robertson Memorial, and the Thunderbird International Junior. She was a member of the United States team in the 2006 Junior Ryder Cup, where she went 2–0 to help the U.S. earn a 6–6 tie. She won the 2009 and 2012 Women's Eastern Amateurs.

Isabelle and her older sister Marika played on the varsity golf team for their college, the University of Florida.

== Personal life ==
Isabelle is the daughter of former professional tennis star Ivan Lendl and his wife Samantha Frankel. Isabelle has four sisters and is a twin.

== Team appearances ==
Amateur

- Junior Ryder Cup (representing the United States): 2006
- Junior Solheim Cup (representing the United States): 2007
