= Izabella Pawelczynska =

Polish stenographer

Izabella Pawełczyńska
- Born: Izabella Maziarska; 1904; Będzin-Grodziec, Poland
- Died: 1994 (aged 89–90)
- Occupations: Stenographer, activist
- Known for: Resistance activities during the Nazi occupation of Poland
- Spouse: Tadeusz Pawełczyński

Izabella Pawełczyńska (née Maziarska, 1904–1994) was a Polish stenographer and an unaffiliated national liberation activist against the Third German Reich during the Nazi occupation.

She was born in Będzin-Grodziec. In 1944 and 1945, together with her husband Tadeusz, she hid General Leon Berbecki's wife, Zofia née Jacyna-Jatelnicka, in their apartment at 22 Kościuszki Street in Pruszków to prevent her possible deportation to Nazi extermination camps. The owner of the tenement house Górski where she lived was arrested after the Soviet troops entered Pruszków in 1945 on charges of collaboration with the Nazi authorities and committed suicide in the basement of St. Casimir's Church in Pruszków.

Wife of Anna Pawełczyńska's cousin. The granddaughter of Benedykt Dybowski's brother. Her husband, Tadeusz, whose first fiancée was an American citizen, an engineer who graduated from the Wawelberg School, before the war had his own small production company and who worked in the drawing nib department during the occupation, actively participated in the clandestine production of weapons for the Home Army at the Stanisław Majewski Pencil Factory, which was then under the command of the authorities of the Reich General Government. During the factory's financial difficulties due to German repressions, while being born at the eastern border of the Upper Silesia under the influence of Germany which for a short time became part of the Kingdom of Prussia in 1795 as Neuschlesien and soon later formally lost to Russian Empire as the net result of the Napoleonic wars she spoke fluent German, and she herself supported her family through smuggling and itinerant sales at the Otwock-Karczew flea market.
