= Isabelle (sculpture) =

2018 artwork by Julian Voss-Andreae

- The sculpture in 2024
- Artist: Julian Voss-Andreae
- Year: 2018
- Medium: Stainless steel sculpture
- Location: Palm Springs, California, U.S.
- 33.82367°N 116.5475°W

Isabelle is a sculpture by German artist Julian Voss-Andreae, installed in Palm Springs, California. The stainless steel sculpture of a woman was unveiled in front of the Rowan Hotel on March 29, 2018. It is 12 feet by 12 feet x 10 feet with internal LED lighting. The Los Angeles Times has described the artwork as a "marvel only visible from certain angles". According to Arizona Foothills Magazine, the sculpture has "surprising views from every angle".
