= Izabela Zubko =

Polish poet

- Izabela Zubko
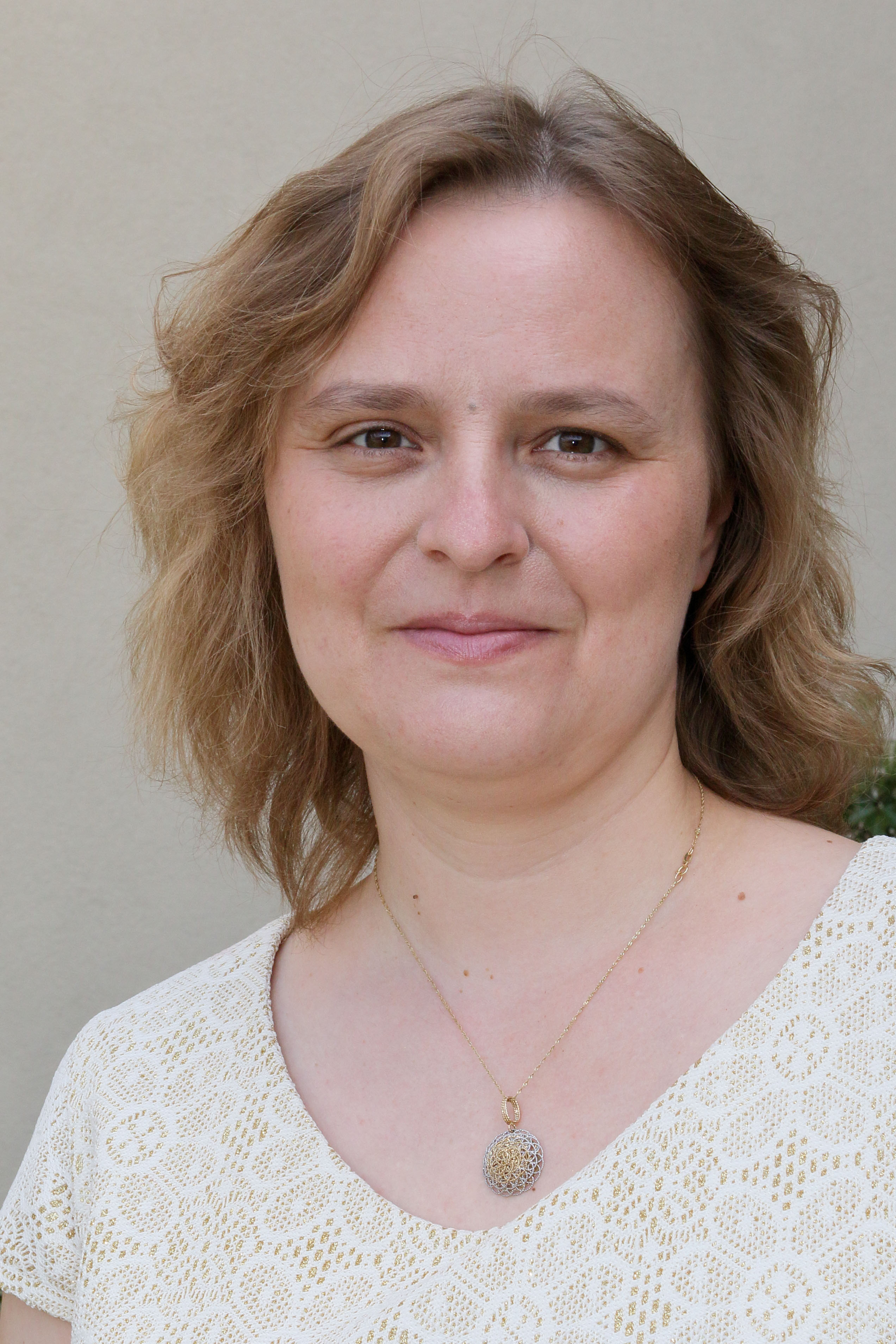
- Izabela Zubko (2017)
- Born: 2 June 1974 (age 52); Warsaw, Poland
- Writing career
- Genre: Poet
- Notable awards: Bronze Cross of Merit; Silver Cross of Merit; Decoration of Honor Meritorious for Polish Culture; Bronze Medal for Merit to Culture – Gloria Artis

Izabela Zubko (born 2 June 1974) is a Polish poet.

== Life and career ==
She was born in Warsaw, raised in Dęblin, Poland. She graduated from Literary-Artistic studies at the Faculty of Polish Studies at Jagiellonian University in Cracow. She is a member of the Polish Writers’ Union (Związek Literatów Polskich), the Polish Authors’ Association of the 2nd Warsaw Branch (Stowarzyszenie Autorów Polskich), a literary-musical group “Terra Poetica”, and the Association of Culture Originators in Warsaw (Warszawskie Stowarzyszenie Twórców Kultury).

Her poems were translated into languages: Ukrainian, Lithuanian, Russian, English, French, Telugu, Hungarian. Her works are present in many anthologies, including international collections, among others: Poeci naszych czasów (The Poets of our Times) and Anthology of Slavic Poetry. Her name can be found in Mini-słownik biograficzny polskich współczesnych poetów religijnych (Biographical Mini-Dictionary of the Polish Modern Religious Authors).

A musical composition inspired by her poem Romantyka (Romanticism) became a musical showpiece of “Neoclassic” duet. In 2007 Aleksander Chodakowski, the composer, and Natalia Miżygórska, the singer, were awarded the prize of the Polish Ambassador in Ukraine for this musical piece. They represented Ukraine with this song during the International Poetry Festival named after Maria Konopnicka in Przedbórz. Izabela Zubko's poems arranged by Michał Pastuszak are being sung by the participants of vocal workshops in the Culture Center in Dęblin and by singer Alina Małachowska.

During the years of 2007–2017 Izabela Zubko was a member of the editorial team of Myśl Literacka (Literary Thought), the supplement in weekly magazine Myśl Polska (Polish Thought). In 2017 she started working in Metafora Współczesności (The Metaphor of Contemporariness), the periodical of the international literary group Kwadrat (The Square). She is actively cooperating with a social-cultural magazine Własnym Głosem (With my own Voice) published by the Workers’ Association of Culture Originators (Robotnicze Stowarzyszenie Twórców Kultury).

== Works ==
=== Poetry ===
- Gołębie (1993) [Doves]
- Stratus (1995) [Stratus]
- Niebieski domek (1996) [A Little Blue House]
- Nocą budzi się sen (2004) [At Night the Dream Awakes]
- Obraz w wierszu wiersz w obrazie (2006) [The Image in the Poem the Poem in the Image]
- Łącząc brzegi przepaści (2010) [Connecting the Edges of the Abyss]
- Świat wygasłych lamp (2017) [The World of Extinct Lamps]
- Wierszariusz słowiański (2020) [Slavic Poems]
- Gdy Anioł przychodzi (2022) [When the Angel Comes]
- Kontury myśli (2022) [Contours of Thoughts]

=== Religious Triptych ===
- W imię Ojca... (2008) [In the name of the Father...]
- W imię Syna… (2015) [In the name of the Son...]
- W imię Ducha… (2018) [In the name of the Spirit...]

=== Marian Diptych ===
- Kwiaty z Niebieskiego Ogrodu (2021) [The Flowers from the Heaven's Garden]
- Maryjne zakątki (2022) [Marian Nooks]

=== Prose ===
- Mały pisarczyk z Małoszyc (2017), album artysty / Stanisław Stanik, Izabela Zubko [A Litte Writer from Małoszyce, the artist's album]
- Dotykam słów (2023), recenzje, wstępy, posłowia [I touch the words (2023), reviews, prefaces, epilogues]

== Awards ==
- Silver Badge of the Workers’ Association of Culture Originators (2010)
- Golden Badge of the Workers’ Association of Culture Originators (2015)
- Statuette named after Stanisław Moniuszko (2016, Lithuania)
- Decoration of Honor Meritorious for Polish Culture (2017)
- Bronze Cross of Merit (2018)
- Commemorative medal „Pro Masovia” (2020)
- International Literary Award „Rusy Golden Pen” (2021)
- Stefan Żeromski Literary Award (2021)
- Bronze „Medal for Merit to Culture – Gloria Artis” (2022)
- Silver Cross of Merit (2024)
