= Isabel Jean Jones =

English-born South African consumer journalist

- Born: Jones; London
- Died: 11 March 2008
- Citizenship: England, South Africa
- Occupation: journalist
- Notable work: Fair Deal
- Awards: dti Award for Consumer Champions

Isabel Jean Jones was an English-born South African consumer journalist, best known for her consumer rights programme Fair Deal.

== Biography ==
Jones was born in London, but she lived in South Africa for 20 years.

In 2007, she won the dti Award for Consumer Champions.

== Death ==
Jones died in Johannesburg on 11 March 2008, after being admitted to the hospital on 7 March 2008. She had previously been admitted to hospital in December 2007, where she had undergone open heart surgery. Her funeral was held on International Consumer Day, on 15 March 2008.

== Other references ==
- https://web.archive.org/web/20071014205447/http://www.famousfaces.co.za/masterfile/i_jones.html
