= Princess Isabelle of Orléans =

Isabelle of Orléans or Isabelle d'Orléans may refer to:

- Élisabeth Marguerite d'Orléans (1646-1696), Duchess of Alençon and Angoulême
- Princess Marie Isabelle of Orléans (1848–1919), Spanish infanta and French princess
- Princess Isabelle of Orléans (1878–1961), member of the French Orleanist royal family and by marriage Duchess of Guise
- Princess Isabelle of Orléans (1900–1983), member of the House of Orléans and by marriage Countess of Harcourt
- Princess Isabelle of Orléans-Braganza (1911–2003), historical author and consort of the Orleanist pretender, Henri, Count of Paris
