= Isabella =

Isabella may refer to:

== People and fictional characters ==
- Isabella (given name), including a list of people and fictional characters
- Isabella (surname), including a list of people

== Places ==
=== United States ===
- Isabella, Alabama, an unincorporated community
- Isabella, California, a former settlement
- Lake Isabella, California, a man-made reservoir
- Isabella, Georgia, an unincorporated community
- Isabella County, Michigan
- Isabella, an unincorporated community in Isabella Township, Michigan
- Isabella, Minnesota, an unincorporated community
- Isabella, Missouri, an unincorporated community
- Isabella River (Minnesota)
- Isabella, Oklahoma, a census-designated place and unincorporated community
- Isabella, Pennsylvania (disambiguation)
- Isabella Furnace, a cold-blast charcoal iron furnace, Pennsylvania

=== Elsewhere ===
- Isabella River (New South Wales), Australia
- Isabella Island, Tasmania, Australia
- Isabela Island (Galápagos)
- Isabella, Manitoba, Canada, a settlement
- Isabella Lake (Alberta), Canada
- Isabella, Estonia, a village
- Isabella Plantation, an ornamental area in Richmond Park in London, United Kingdom
- Isabella (crater), on Venus
- 210 Isabella, an asteroid

== Arts and entertainment ==
- Isabella, or the Pot of Basil, an 1818 narrative poem by John Keats adapted from a story in Boccaccio's Decameron
- Isabella (Millais painting), an 1849 painting by John Everett Millais, also known as Lorenzo and Isabella
- Isabella and the Pot of Basil, an 1868 painting by William Holman Hunt
- Isabella (Maris painting), a 1906 painting by Simon Maris
- Isabella, Duchess of the Devils, a 1969 film from Italy/West-Germany
- Isabella (novel), a 1988 novel by Finnish author Kaari Utrio
- Isabella (1988 film), a 1988 film from India
- "Isabella" (The Sopranos) (1999), the twelfth episode of the TV show
- Isabella (album), a 2002 album by German Schlager group Die Flippers
- Isabella (2006 film), a 2006 film from Hong Kong
- "Isabella", a 2024 song by ¥$ from Vultures 2

== Species ==
- Agathodes isabella, a moth species
- Alara isabella, a bug species
- Antispila isabella, a moth species
- Araneus isabella, a spider species
- Cancilla isabella, a sea snail species
- Chesias isabella, a moth species
- Damias isabella, a moth species
- Eois isabella, a moth species
- Eschata isabella, a moth species
- Funisciurus isabella or Lady Burton's rope squirrel, a rodent species
- Inquisitor isabella, a sea snail species
- Luria isabella, a sea snail species
- Platygraphis isabella, the only species in the moth genus Platygraphis
- Pyrrharctia isabella, a moth species
- Stiltia isabella or Australian pratincole, a bird species
- Strioterebrum isabella, a sea snail species

== Transportation ==
- Isabella (ship), various ships
- Borgward Isabella, an automobile manufactured by Carl F. W. Borgward GmbH from 1954 to 1962
- Isabella station, a former station on the Chicago Transit Authority's Evanston Line

== Other uses ==
- Isabella (grape), an American hybrid grape variety
- Isabella High School, Alabama, United States
- Isabella piercing, a female genital piercing
- Isabella quarter, an American commemorative coin struck in 1893
- Isabelline (colour) or Isabella, a greyish-yellow or light buff colour
- Operation Isabella, a German World War II plan that was never implemented

== See also ==
- Isabel (disambiguation)
- Isabela (disambiguation)
- Isabelle (disambiguation)
- Isabella River (disambiguation)
