= Lake Isabella (disambiguation) =

Lake Isabella is a large man-made reservoir in Kern County, California.

Lake Isabella may also refer to:

- Lake Isabella, California, a community in Kern County
- Lake Isabella, Michigan, a village
- Lake Isabella Historic Residential District, Florida
- Lake Isabella State Forest, Minnesota

== See also ==
- Isabella Lake (Alberta), a lake in Canada
- Lake Isabelle, a lake in Dakota County, Minnesota
- Lake Isabel (disambiguation)
