= Izabela =

Izabela could refer to:

- Izabela, Kuyavian-Pomeranian Voivodeship, a village in Kuyavian-Pomeranian Voivodeship, Poland
- Izabela, Masovian Voivodeship, in Masovian Voivodeship, Poland
- Izabela (name), a feminine given name

== See also ==
- Isabela (disambiguation)
- Isabella (disambiguation)
