= Isabella River =

Isabella River may refer to:

- Isabella River (Minnesota), USA, a tributary of South Kawishiwi River
- Isabella River (New South Wales), Australia, a tributary of Abercrombie River

== See also ==
- Isabella (disambiguation)
- Little Isabella River
