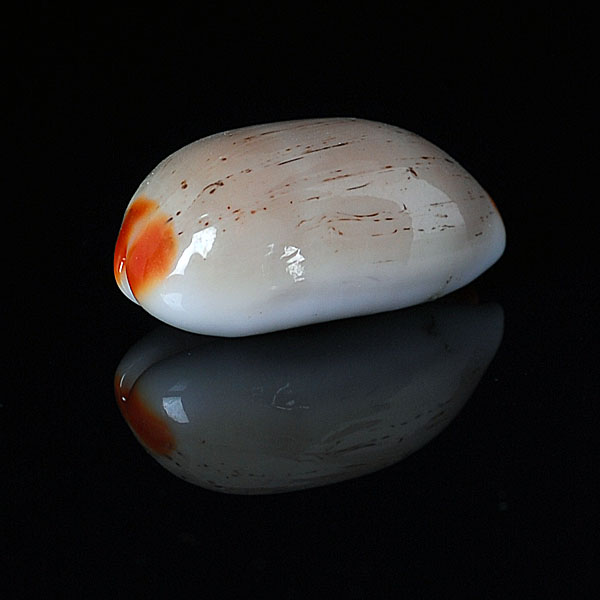
- A lateral view of a shell of Luria isabella gilvella, anterior end towards the right

Scientific classification
- Kingdom: Animalia
- Phylum: Mollusca
- Class: Gastropoda
- Subclass: Caenogastropoda
- Order: Littorinimorpha
- Family: Cypraeidae
- Genus: Luria
- Species: L. isabella
- Subspecies: L. i. gilvella

Trinomial name
- Luria isabella gilvella Lorenz, 2002

= Luria isabella gilvella =

Species of gastropod

Luria isabella gilvella is a subspecies of sea snail, a cowry, a marine gastropod mollusk in the family Cypraeidae, the cowries.
