= Isabella of Jerusalem (disambiguation) =

Isabella of Jerusalem refers to Isabella I of Jerusalem (1172–1205), queen regnant of the Kingdom of Jerusalem.

Isabella of Jerusalem may also refer to:

- Isabella II of Jerusalem (1212–1228), queen regnant of the Kingdom of Jerusalem
- Isabella of Cyprus (died 1265), regent to the Kingdom of Jerusalem

== See also ==
- Sibylla, Queen of Jerusalem (1159–1190), queen of Jerusalem
- Isabella (disambiguation)
