= Lake Isabel =

Lake Isabel main refer to:

- Lake Isabel (Colorado)
- Lake Isabel (Flathead County, Montana), a lake in Glacier National Park, Montana
- Lake Isabelle, also called Lake Isabel, a lake in Dakota County, Minnesota

== See also ==
- Lake Isabella (disambiguation)
