= Damias insignis =

Scientific classification
- Domain: Eukaryota
- Kingdom: Animalia
- Phylum: Arthropoda
- Class: Insecta
- Order: Lepidoptera
- Superfamily: Noctuoidea
- Family: Erebidae
- Subfamily: Arctiinae
- Genus: Damias
- Species: D. insignis

Binomial name
- Damias insignis (Rothschild, 1912)

Synonyms
- Caprimima insignis Rothschild, 1912

Species of moth

Damias insignis is a moth of the family Erebidae. It is found on the Solomon Islands.
