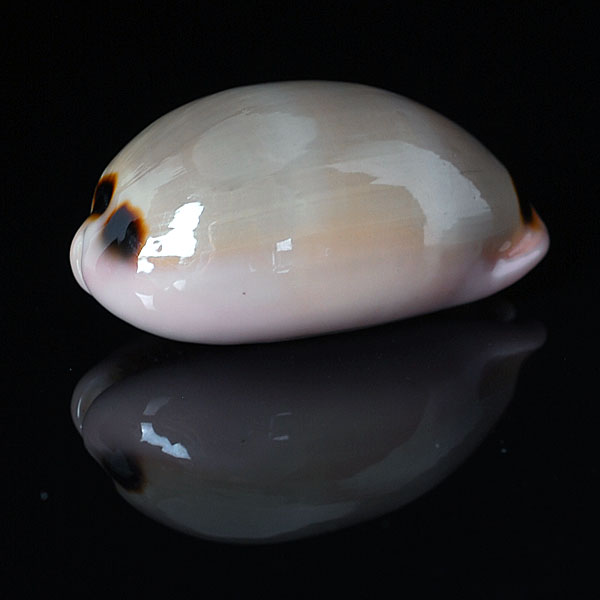
- A lateral view of a shell of Luria pulchra, anterior end towards the right

Scientific classification
- Kingdom: Animalia
- Phylum: Mollusca
- Class: Gastropoda
- Subclass: Caenogastropoda
- Order: Littorinimorpha
- Family: Cypraeidae
- Genus: Luria
- Species: L. pulchra

Binomial name
- Luria pulchra (Gray, 1824)

Synonyms
- Cypraea pulchra Gray, 1824 (basionym)

= Luria pulchra =

Species of gastropod

Luria pulchra is a species of sea snail, a cowry, a marine gastropod mollusk in the family Cypraeidae, the cowries.

== Subspecies ==
The following subspecies are recognized :

- Luria pulchra akabensis
- Luria pulchra pulchra (Gray, J.E., 1824) (synonyms : Cypraea pulchella Gray, J.E., 1824; Cypraea viridacea Sulliotti, G.R., 1924)
- Luria pulchra sinaiensis Heiman & Mienis, 2000

== Description ==
L. pulchra is superficially similar to L. lurida. L.pulchra is less swollen, smoother, glossier, and lighter in color.

== Distribution ==
This species is distributed in the Red Sea, the Gulf of Aqaba, the Gulf of Oman, the Persian Gulf and along Eritrea.
