= Damias monoleuca =

Scientific classification
- Kingdom: Animalia
- Phylum: Arthropoda
- Class: Insecta
- Order: Lepidoptera
- Superfamily: Noctuoidea
- Family: Erebidae
- Subfamily: Arctiinae
- Genus: Damias
- Species: D. monoleuca

Binomial name
- Damias monoleuca (Hampson, 1914)

Synonyms
- Caprimima monoleuca Hampson, 1914

Species of moth

Damias monoleuca is a moth of the family Erebidae. It is found on Goodenough Island.
