= Damias calida =

Scientific classification
- Kingdom: Animalia
- Phylum: Arthropoda
- Class: Insecta
- Order: Lepidoptera
- Superfamily: Noctuoidea
- Family: Erebidae
- Subfamily: Arctiinae
- Genus: Damias
- Species: D. calida

Binomial name
- Damias calida (Walker, [1865])

Synonyms
- Scaptesyle calida Walker, [1865]; Hypocrita flavicollis Snellen, 1879; Caprimima tenuis Rothschild & Jordan, 1901; Damias reducta Draudt, 1914; Damias milnensis Strand, 1922; Neoscaptia calida (Walker, [1865])

Species of moth

Damias calida is a moth of the family Erebidae first described by Francis Walker in 1865. It is found on Sulawesi, Seram and in New Guinea.
