= Simon Maris =

Dutch painter

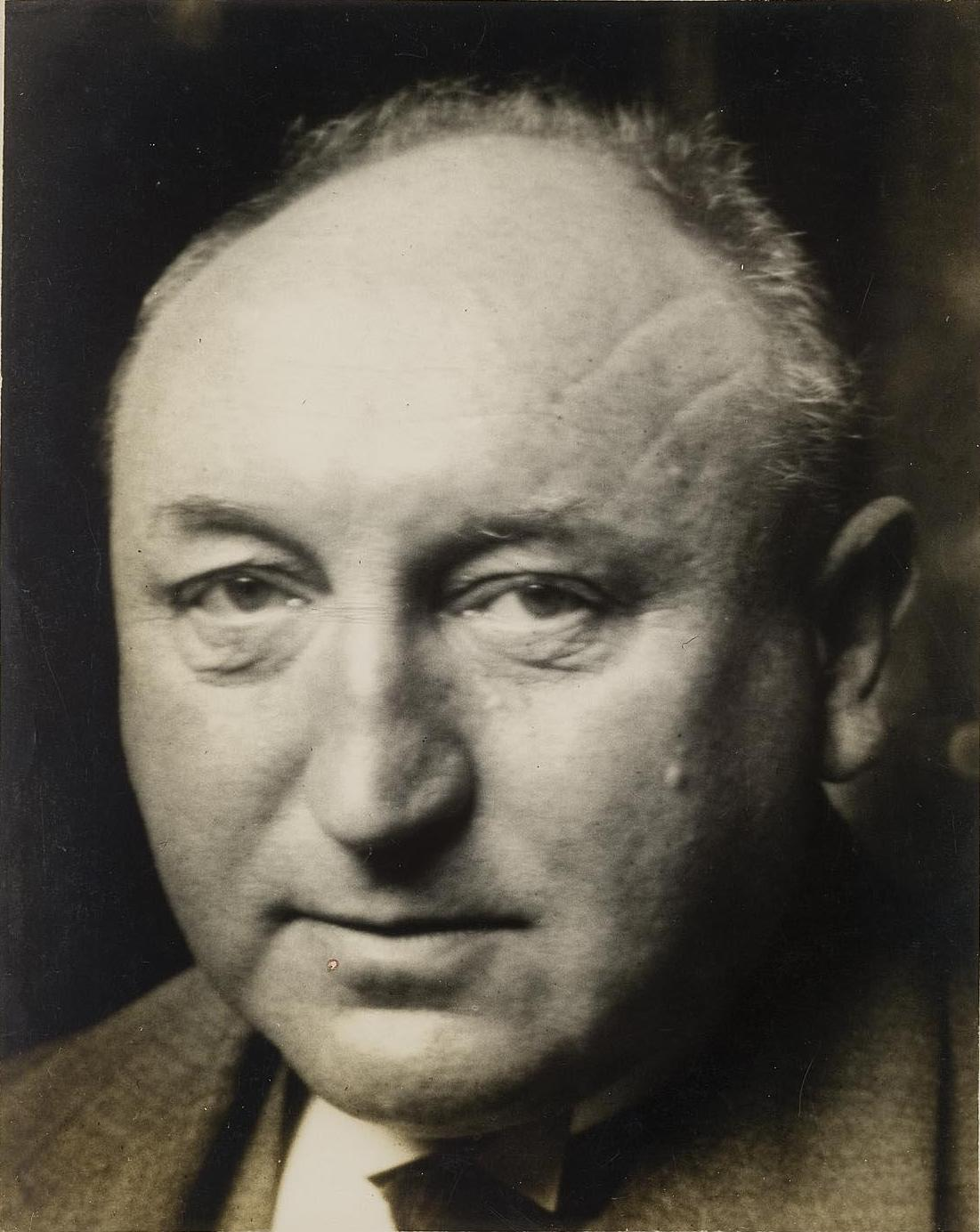
Portrait of Simon Maris by Willem Witsen

Simon Willem Maris (May 21, 1873 – January 22, 1935) was a Dutch painter best known as a portrait artist. He was the son of Dutch landscape painter Willem Maris of the Hague School.

== Life and work ==
He was born in The Hague. Simon Maris was a student of his father Willem Maris and subsequently studied at the Royal Academy of Fine Arts in The Hague and at the Royal Academy of Fine Arts Arts of Antwerp. He then spent some time in Brussels and made study trips to Paris and Italy. In 1900 he settled in Amsterdam. In 1903 he traveled with his friend Piet Mondriaan for a few months to Spain. Together with Mondrian and Arnold Marc Gorter he would regularly paint in the following years on the Gein River, where he also drew Mondrian's portrait in 1906. After his marriage to Cornelia den Breejen in 1908, he worked in Zandvoort during the summers.

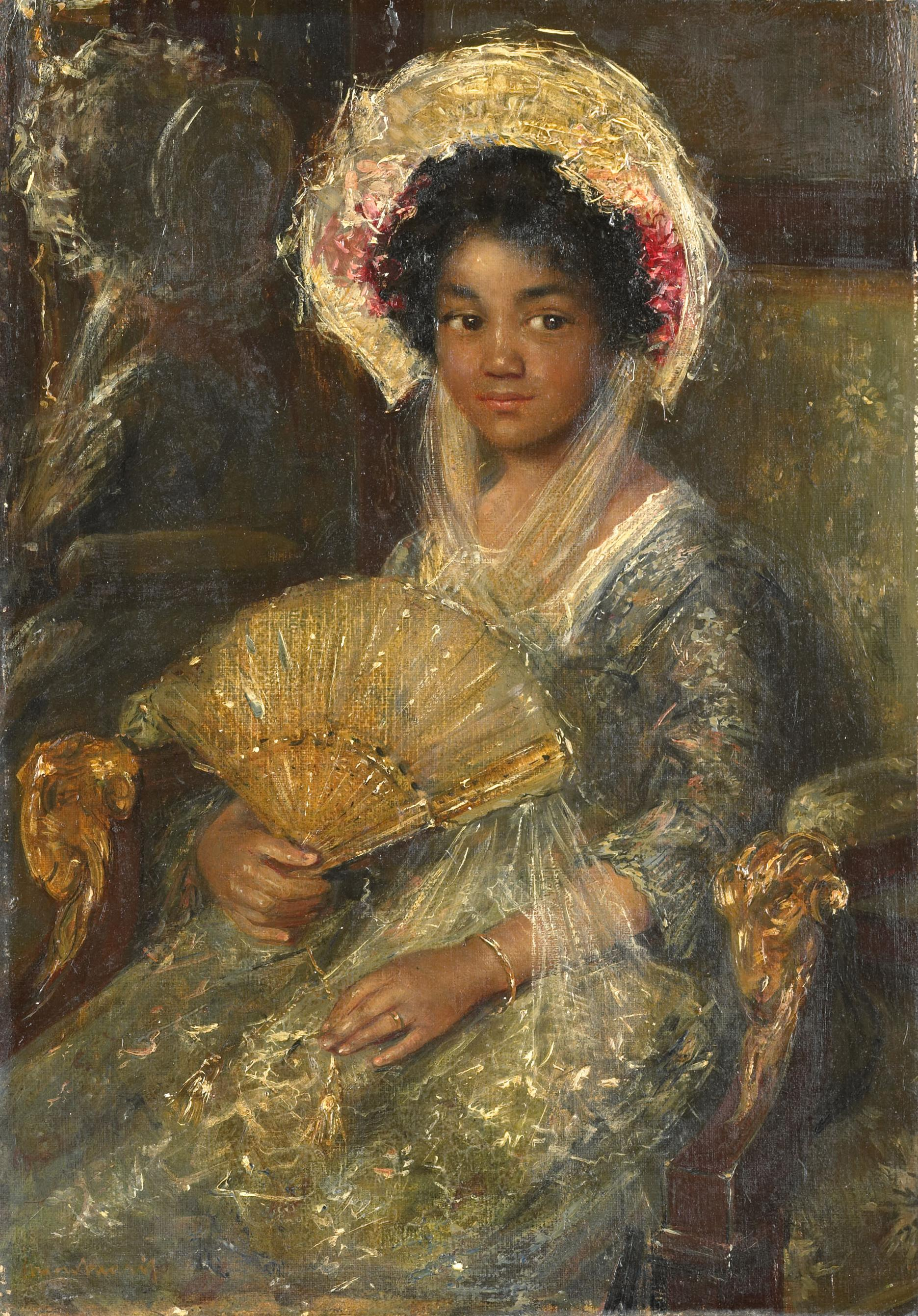
Isabella, 1906. Oil on canvas. 41 × 29 cm (16.1 × 11.4 ″). Amsterdam, Rijksmuseum

Maris became especially famous as a portrait artist, mostly of worldly women, often commissioned. He also made more informal portraits of mothers with children or women reading, using his wife and children as models. He also painted cityscapes, beach scenes, landscapes and still lifes. He worked in both a realistic and impressionistic style, with close attention to how sunlight works. His work has a striking relationship with that of Albert Roelofs, also the son of a well-known Hague artist—Willem Roelofs.

Maris was a well-known figure in Amsterdam artist circles around 1900. He died in 1935 at the age of 61 in Amsterdam. His work, along with his most famous painting Isabella, is among the collections of the Rijksmuseum Amsterdam, the Dordrechts Museum, the Drents Museum in Assen, the Groninger Museum, the Municipal Museum of The Hague and the Museum Arnhem.
