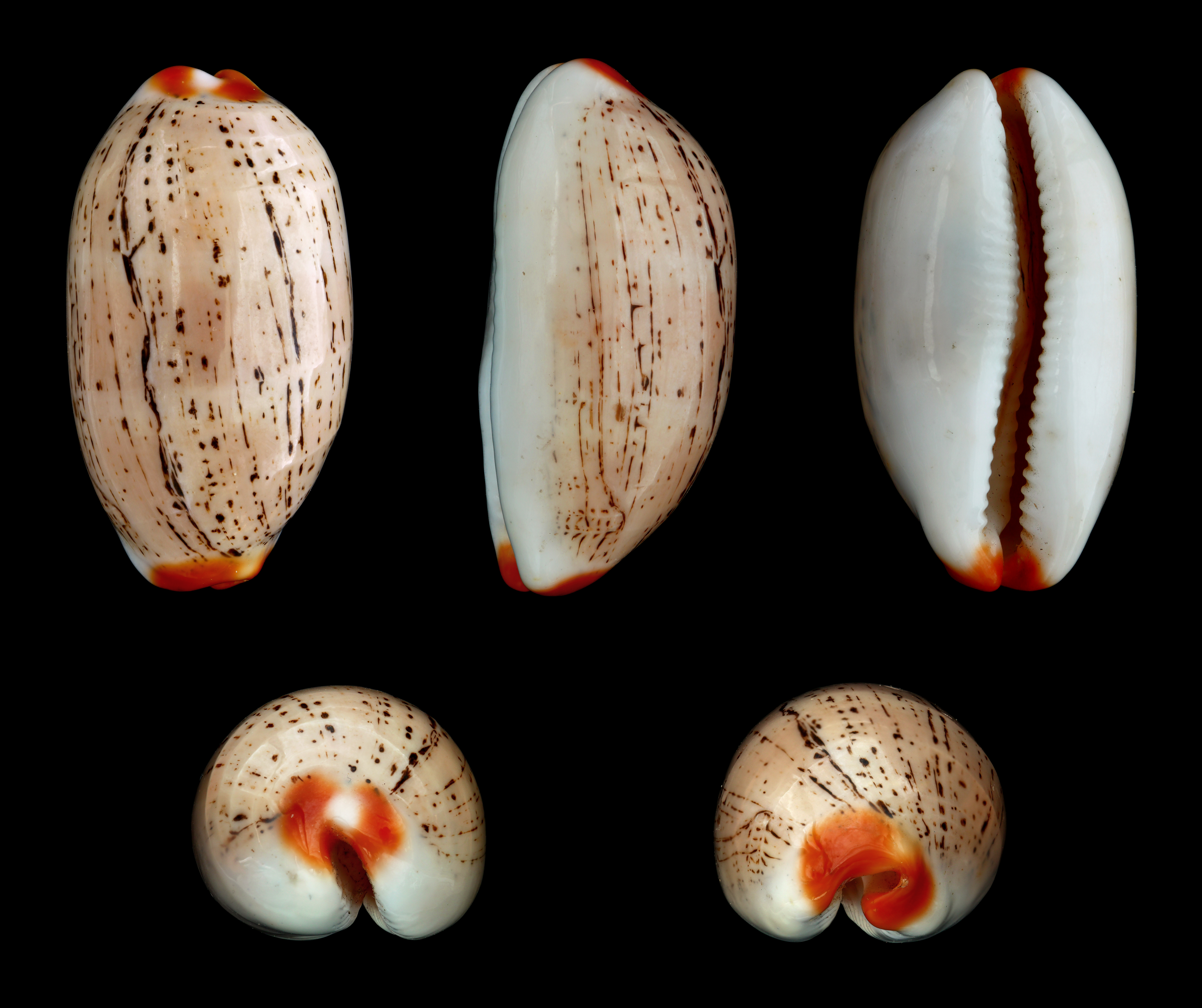
- Five views of a shell of Luria isabella
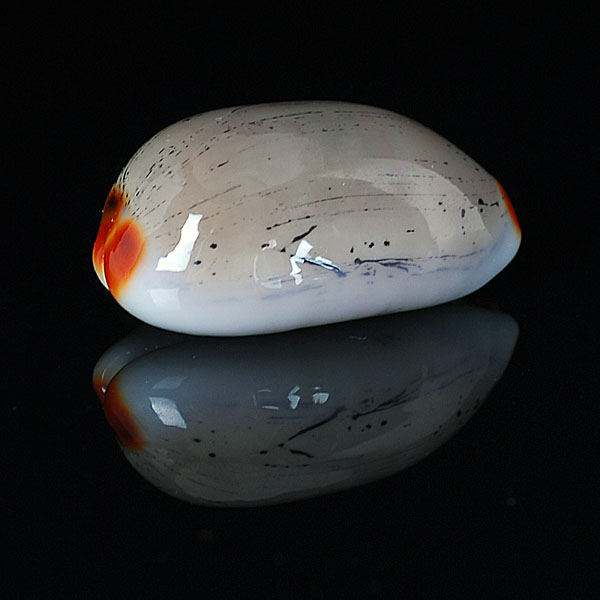
- A lateral view of a shell of Luria isabella, anterior end towards the right

Scientific classification
- Kingdom: Animalia
- Phylum: Mollusca
- Class: Gastropoda
- Subclass: Caenogastropoda
- Order: Littorinimorpha
- Family: Cypraeidae
- Genus: Luria
- Species: L. isabella

Binomial name
- Luria isabella (Linnaeus, 1758)
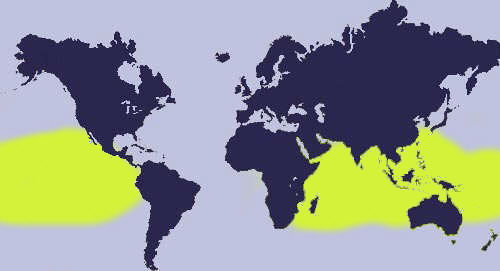

Synonyms
- Cypraea isabella Linnaeus, 1758; Cypraea literata Time, 1822; Cypraea clara Gaskoin, J.S., 1851; Cypraea isabelloides Schilder, F.A., 1924; Cypraea cavia Steadman, W.R. & B.C. Cotton, 1946; Cypraea lemuriana Steadman, W.R. & B.C. Cotton, 1946; Cypraea cylindroides Coen, G.S., 1949

= Luria isabella =

Species of gastropod

Luria isabella, common names Isabel's cowry, Isabella cowry or fawn-coloured cowry, is a species of sea snail, a cowry, a marine gastropod mollusk in the family Cypraeidae, the cowries.

== Description ==
The shells of these very common cowries reach on average 25–35 millimetres (0.98–1.38 in) of length, with a minimum size of 8 millimetres (0.31 in) and a maximum size of 54 millimetres (2.1 in). The basic color of these cylindrical-shaped shells is light beige or fawn or pale reddish-brown, the dorsum surface is crossed by thin discontinuous longitudinal markings and the extremities show orange-red terminal spots. The base is mainly white and the long and narrow aperture has several short teeth. In the living cowries the well developed mantle is black matt and almost velvety, with external short antennae.

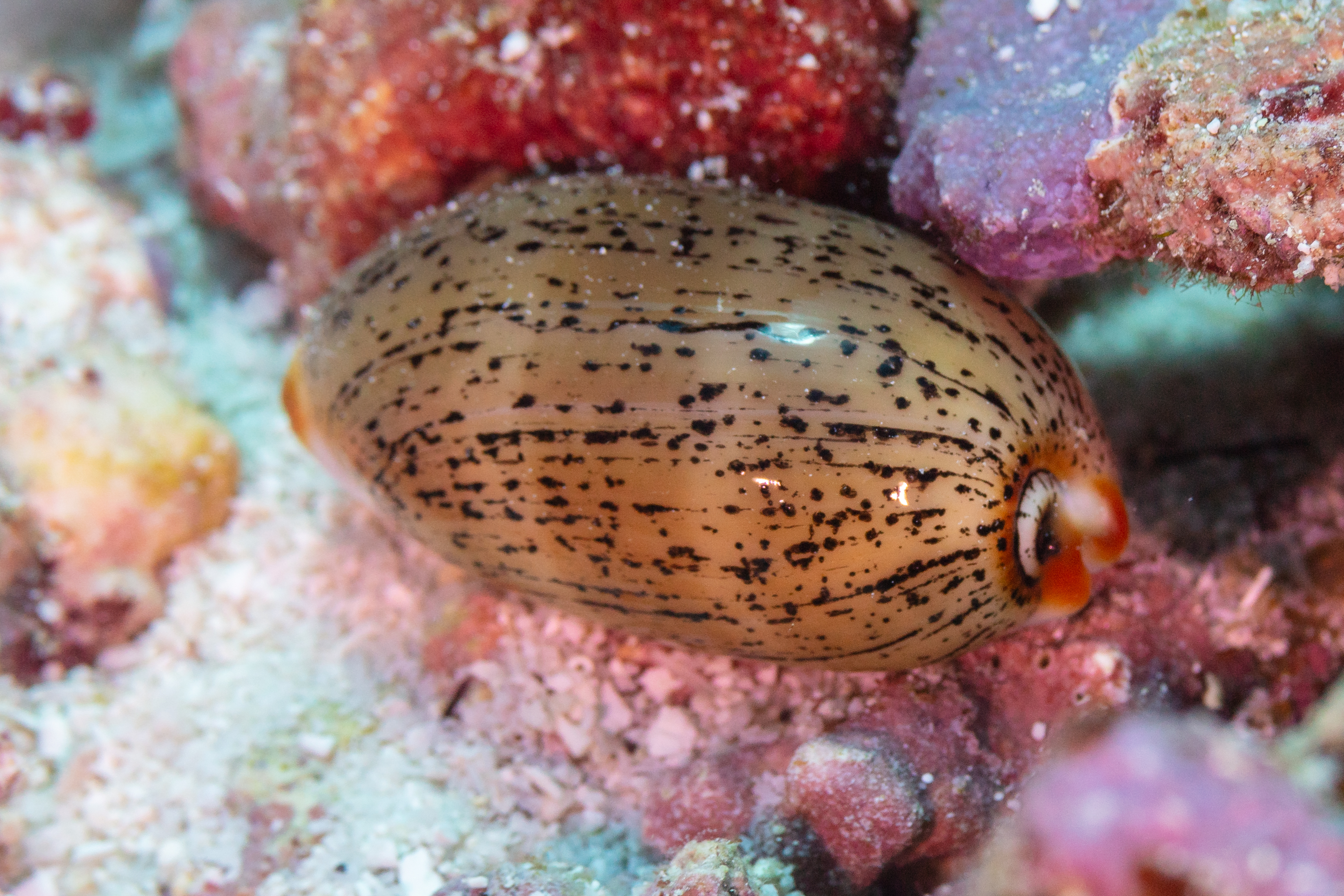
Shell of an alive exemplar of Luria isabella in Zanzibar, Tanzania

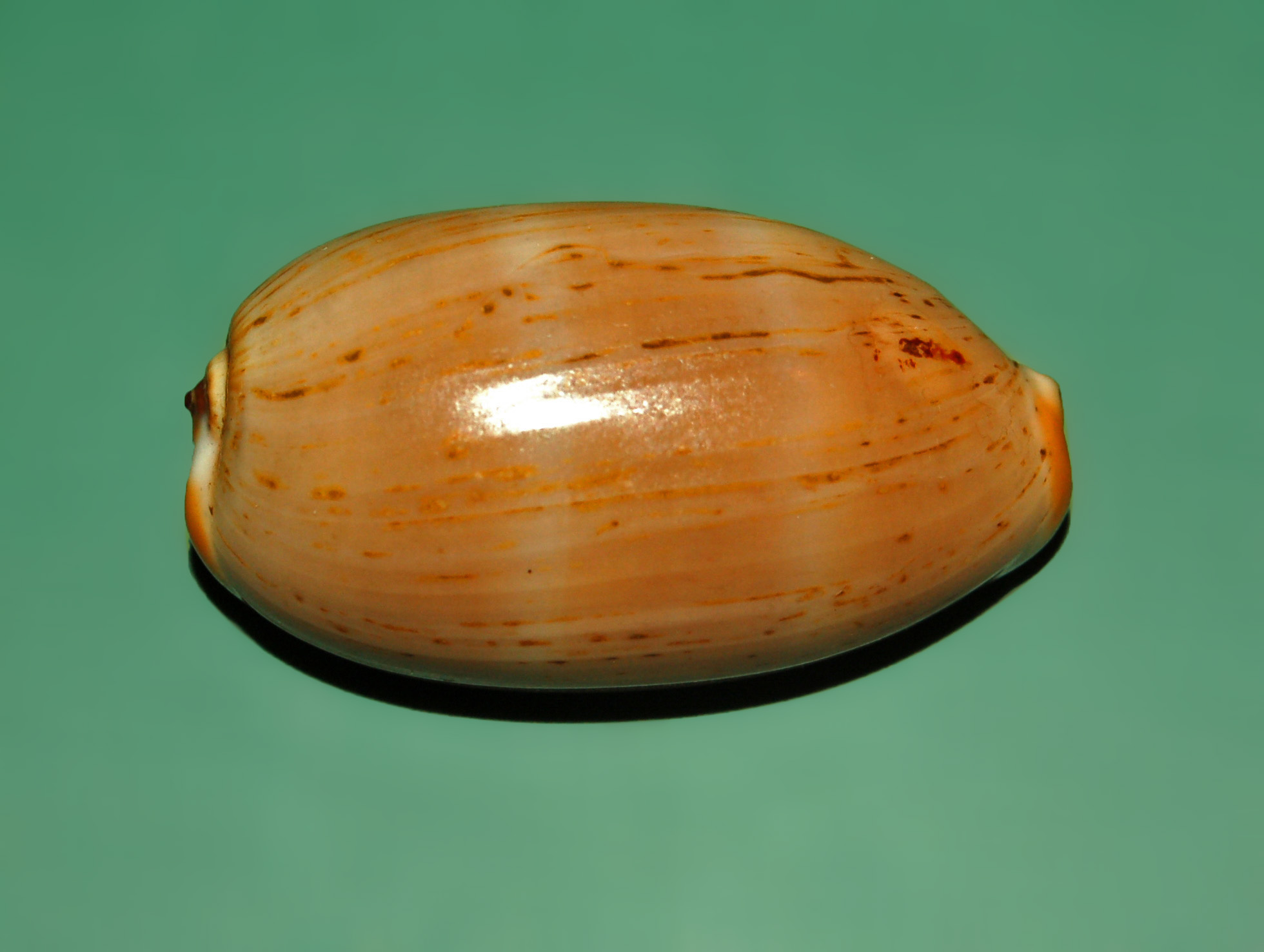
Shell of Luria isabella from Philippines

== Distribution ==
This species lives in the Red Sea, along the East African coast, the Mascarene Basin and in the Indo-West Pacific Ocean (Malaysia, Indonesia, Australia, Melanesia, Philippines, Southern Japan, Taiwan) up to Hawaii.

Fossils have been found in Holocene strata on the Eniwetok Atol, Marshall Islands and in Pliocene or Pleistocene strata on Guam.

== Habitat ==
Living cowries of this species can be encountered in a wide range of habitats, in shallow and in intertidal waters up to about 35 metres (115 ft) of depth. During the day they usually stay under rocks and stones or in small holes or coral caves. At dawn or dusk they start feeding on sponges, algae or coral polyps.

== Subspecies ==
There have been a great many subspecies named, but most names are very dubious. However the following are generally accepted as valid names:

- Luria isabella isabella (Linnaeus, 1758)
- Luria isabella controversa (Gray, 1824) (sometimes accepted as Luria controversa)
- Luria isabella gilvella Lorenz, 1999
- Luria isabella lekalekana Ladd, 1934
- Luria isabella mexicana Stearns, 1893
