= Damias catarrhoa =

Scientific classification
- Kingdom: Animalia
- Phylum: Arthropoda
- Class: Insecta
- Order: Lepidoptera
- Superfamily: Noctuoidea
- Family: Erebidae
- Subfamily: Arctiinae
- Genus: Damias
- Species: D. catarrhoa

Binomial name
- Damias catarrhoa (Meyrick, 1886)

Synonyms
- Chiriphe catarrhoa Meyrick, 1886

Species of moth

Damias catarrhoa is a moth of the family Erebidae first described by Edward Meyrick in 1886. It is found in western Australia.
