= Damias aurantiomarginata =

Scientific classification
- Domain: Eukaryota
- Kingdom: Animalia
- Phylum: Arthropoda
- Class: Insecta
- Order: Lepidoptera
- Superfamily: Noctuoidea
- Family: Erebidae
- Subfamily: Arctiinae
- Genus: Damias
- Species: D. aurantiomarginata

Binomial name
- Damias aurantiomarginata (Rothschild, 1912)

Synonyms
- Caprimima aurantiomarginata Rothschild, 1912

Species of moth

Damias aurantiomarginata is a moth of the family Erebidae. It is found on the Solomon Islands.
