= Damias biakensis =

Scientific classification
- Kingdom: Animalia
- Phylum: Arthropoda
- Class: Insecta
- Order: Lepidoptera
- Superfamily: Noctuoidea
- Family: Erebidae
- Subfamily: Arctiinae
- Genus: Damias
- Species: D. biakensis

Binomial name
- Damias biakensis De Vos & Hyvärinen, 2009

Species of moth

Damias biakensis is a moth of the family Erebidae. It is found in Papua New Guinea (Pulau Biak).
