= Eschata xanthocera =

Scientific classification
- Kingdom: Animalia
- Phylum: Arthropoda
- Clade: Pancrustacea
- Class: Insecta
- Order: Lepidoptera
- Family: Crambidae
- Subfamily: Crambinae
- Tribe: Chiloini
- Genus: Eschata
- Species: E. xanthocera

Binomial name
- Eschata xanthocera Hampson, 1896

Species of moth

Eschata xanthocera is a moth in the family Crambidae. It was described by George Hampson in 1896. It is found in Sri Lanka.

== Description ==
Its wingspan is about 38 mm. Forewings with somewhat produced and acute apex. In the male, the antennae is orange. Legs orange and fringed with whitish hair. Forewings with postmedial and submarginal lines almost obsolete. Cilia white with golden tips throughout.
