= Damias coeruleomarginata =

Scientific classification
- Domain: Eukaryota
- Kingdom: Animalia
- Phylum: Arthropoda
- Class: Insecta
- Order: Lepidoptera
- Superfamily: Noctuoidea
- Family: Erebidae
- Subfamily: Arctiinae
- Genus: Damias
- Species: D. coeruleomarginata

Binomial name
- Damias coeruleomarginata (Rothschild, 1912)

Synonyms
- Caprimima coeruleomarginata Rothschild, 1912; Damias imitatrix Rothschild, 1912; Damias perimitatrix Rothschild, 1912; Damias peramitatrix

Species of moth

Damias coeruleomarginata is a moth of the family Erebidae first described by Walter Rothschild in 1912. It is found in New Guinea.

== Subspecies ==
- Damias coeruleomarginata coeruleomarginata
- Damias coeruleomarginata insularis (Rothschild, 1936) (Goodenough Island)
