= Damias shawmayeri =

Scientific classification
- Domain: Eukaryota
- Kingdom: Animalia
- Phylum: Arthropoda
- Class: Insecta
- Order: Lepidoptera
- Superfamily: Noctuoidea
- Family: Erebidae
- Subfamily: Arctiinae
- Genus: Damias
- Species: D. shawmayeri

Binomial name
- Damias shawmayeri (Rothschild, 1936)

Synonyms
- Caprimima shawmayeri Rothschild, 1936

Species of moth

Damias shawmayeri is a moth of the family Erebidae. It is found in New Guinea.
