= Eschata rembrandti =

Scientific classification
- Kingdom: Animalia
- Phylum: Arthropoda
- Clade: Pancrustacea
- Class: Insecta
- Order: Lepidoptera
- Family: Crambidae
- Subfamily: Crambinae
- Tribe: Chiloini
- Genus: Eschata
- Species: E. rembrandti

Binomial name
- Eschata rembrandti Błeszyński, 1970

Species of moth

Eschata rembrandti is a moth in the family Crambidae. It was described by Stanisław Błeszyński in 1970. It is found in India (Nilgiris).
