= Eschata irrorata =

Scientific classification
- Kingdom: Animalia
- Phylum: Arthropoda
- Clade: Pancrustacea
- Class: Insecta
- Order: Lepidoptera
- Family: Crambidae
- Subfamily: Crambinae
- Tribe: Chiloini
- Genus: Eschata
- Species: E. irrorata

Binomial name
- Eschata irrorata Hampson, 1919

Species of moth

Eschata irrorata is a moth in the family Crambidae. It was described by George Hampson in 1919. It is found in Assam, India.
