= Damias rotunda =

Scientific classification
- Kingdom: Animalia
- Phylum: Arthropoda
- Class: Insecta
- Order: Lepidoptera
- Superfamily: Noctuoidea
- Family: Erebidae
- Subfamily: Arctiinae
- Genus: Damias
- Species: D. rotunda

Binomial name
- Damias rotunda (Hampson, 1900)

Synonyms
- Caprimima rotunda Hampson, 1900

Species of moth

Damias rotunda is a moth of the family Erebidae first described by George Hampson in 1900. It is found on the Louisiade Archipelago in Papua New Guinea.
