= Eschata rococo =

Scientific classification
- Kingdom: Animalia
- Phylum: Arthropoda
- Clade: Pancrustacea
- Class: Insecta
- Order: Lepidoptera
- Family: Crambidae
- Subfamily: Crambinae
- Tribe: Chiloini
- Genus: Eschata
- Species: E. rococo

Binomial name
- Eschata rococo Błeszyński, 1970

Species of moth

Eschata rococo is a moth in the family Crambidae. It was described by Stanisław Błeszyński in 1970. It is found in Khasis, India.
