= Eschata radiata =

Scientific classification
- Kingdom: Animalia
- Phylum: Arthropoda
- Clade: Pancrustacea
- Class: Insecta
- Order: Lepidoptera
- Family: Crambidae
- Subfamily: Crambinae
- Tribe: Chiloini
- Genus: Eschata
- Species: E. radiata

Binomial name
- Eschata radiata C. Swinhoe, 1906

Species of moth

Eschata radiata is a moth in the family Crambidae. It was described by Charles Swinhoe in 1906. It is found in Indonesia, where it has been recorded from the Moluccas.
