= Damias biguttata =

Scientific classification
- Domain: Eukaryota
- Kingdom: Animalia
- Phylum: Arthropoda
- Class: Insecta
- Order: Lepidoptera
- Superfamily: Noctuoidea
- Family: Erebidae
- Subfamily: Arctiinae
- Genus: Damias
- Species: D. biguttata

Binomial name
- Damias biguttata (Rothschild & Jordan, 1901)

Synonyms
- Caprimima biguttata Rothschild & Jordan, 1901; Caprimima buruana van Eecke, 1929; Caprimima reducta Rothschild & Jordan, 1901; Caprimima bipuncta Rothschild, 1912

Species of moth

Damias biguttata is a moth of the family Erebidae first described by Rothschild and Jordan in 1901. It is found in New Guinea and on Buru.

== Subspecies ==
- Damias biguttata biguttata
- Damias biguttata buruana (van Eecke, 1929) (Buru)
