= Eschata tricornia =

Scientific classification
- Kingdom: Animalia
- Phylum: Arthropoda
- Clade: Pancrustacea
- Class: Insecta
- Order: Lepidoptera
- Family: Crambidae
- Subfamily: Crambinae
- Tribe: Chiloini
- Genus: Eschata
- Species: E. tricornia

Binomial name
- Eschata tricornia Song & Chen in Chen, Song & Yuan, 2003

Species of moth

Eschata tricornia is a moth in the family Crambidae. It was described by Shi-Mei Song and Tie-Mei Chen in 2003. It is found in Yunnan, China.
