= Damias caerulescens =

Scientific classification
- Domain: Eukaryota
- Kingdom: Animalia
- Phylum: Arthropoda
- Class: Insecta
- Order: Lepidoptera
- Superfamily: Noctuoidea
- Family: Erebidae
- Subfamily: Arctiinae
- Genus: Damias
- Species: D. caerulescens

Binomial name
- Damias caerulescens (Butler, 1889)

Synonyms
- Scaptesyle caerulescens Butler, 1889; Caprimima caerulescens bougainvillei Rothschild, 1905; Damias caerulescens ab. binomica Strand, 1922; Damias mononis Jordan, 1904; Damias occidentalis Rothschild, 1912 (preocc. Rothschild & Jordan, 1901); Atopomima philocosma Meyrick, 1936

Species of moth

Damias caerulescens is a moth of the family Erebidae first described by Arthur Gardiner Butler in 1889. It is found on the Solomon Islands.
