= Eschata conspurcata =

Scientific classification
- Kingdom: Animalia
- Phylum: Arthropoda
- Clade: Pancrustacea
- Class: Insecta
- Order: Lepidoptera
- Family: Crambidae
- Subfamily: Crambinae
- Tribe: Chiloini
- Genus: Eschata
- Species: E. conspurcata

Binomial name
- Eschata conspurcata Moore, 1888

Species of moth

Eschata conspurcata is a moth in the family Crambidae. It was described by Frederic Moore in 1888. It is found in Darjeeling and Sikkim in India.
