= Eschata =

Scientific classification
- Kingdom: Animalia
- Phylum: Arthropoda
- Clade: Pancrustacea
- Class: Insecta
- Order: Lepidoptera
- Family: Crambidae
- Subfamily: Crambinae
- Tribe: Chiloini
- Genus: Eschata; Walker, 1856

Synonyms
- Chaerecla Walker, 1865

Genus of moths

Eschata is a genus of moths of the family Crambidae.

== Description ==
Palpi porrect (extending forward), reaching slightly beyond the frons and thickly scaled. Maxillary palp dilated with scales and nearly as long as labial. Frons produced to an acute corneous point. Antennae of male thickened and flattened. Tibial and tarsal joints fringed with long hairs. Forewings with vein 3 from before the angle of cell. Vein 7 from cell, anastomosing (fusing) or stalked with veins 8 and 9. Vein 10 free, whereas vein 11 curved and running along the vein 12. Hindwings with veins 3, 4 and 5 from angle of cell and veins 6 and 7 from upper angle.

== Species ==
- Eschata aida Błeszyński, 1970
- Eschata argentata Moore, 1888
- Eschata chrysargyria (Walker, 1865)
- Eschata conspurcata Moore, 1888
- Eschata gelida Walker, 1856
- Eschata hainanensis Wang & Sung, 1981
- Eschata himalaica Błeszyński, 1965
- Eschata horrida Wang & Sung, 1981
- Eschata irrorata Hampson, 1919
- Eschata isabella Błeszyński, 1965
- Eschata melanocera Hampson, 1896
- Eschata minuta Wang & Sung, 1981
- Eschata miranda Błeszyński, 1965
- Eschata ochreipes Hampson, 1891
- Eschata percandida Swinhoe, 1890
- Eschata quadrispinea W. Li & Liu, 2012
- Eschata radiata Swinhoe, 1906
- Eschata rembrandti Błeszyński, 1970
- Eschata rififi Błeszyński, 1965
- Eschata rococo Błeszyński, 1970
- Eschata shafferella Błeszyński, 1965
- Eschata shanghaiensis Wang & Sung, 1981
- Eschata smithi Błeszyński, 1970
- Eschata tricornia Song & Chen in Chen, Song & Yuan, 2003
- Eschata truncata Song & Chen in Chen, Song & Yuan, 2003
- Eschata xanthocera Hampson, 1896
- Eschata xanthorhyncha Hampson, 1896
