= Eschata rififi =

Scientific classification
- Kingdom: Animalia
- Phylum: Arthropoda
- Clade: Pancrustacea
- Class: Insecta
- Order: Lepidoptera
- Family: Crambidae
- Subfamily: Crambinae
- Tribe: Chiloini
- Genus: Eschata
- Species: E. rififi

Binomial name
- Eschata rififi Błeszyński, 1965

Synonyms
- Eschata fififi Hua, 2005

Species of moth

Eschata rififi is a moth in the family Crambidae. It was described by Stanisław Błeszyński in 1965. It is found in Darjeeling, India.
