= Damias quadripuncta =

Scientific classification
- Domain: Eukaryota
- Kingdom: Animalia
- Phylum: Arthropoda
- Class: Insecta
- Order: Lepidoptera
- Superfamily: Noctuoidea
- Family: Erebidae
- Subfamily: Arctiinae
- Genus: Damias
- Species: D. quadripuncta

Binomial name
- Damias quadripuncta (Rothschild, 1915)

Synonyms
- Caprimima quadripuncta Rothschild, 1915

Species of moth

Damias quadripuncta is a moth of the family Erebidae first described by Walter Rothschild in 1915. It is found on Seram.
