= Damias biagi =

Scientific classification
- Domain: Eukaryota
- Kingdom: Animalia
- Phylum: Arthropoda
- Class: Insecta
- Order: Lepidoptera
- Superfamily: Noctuoidea
- Family: Erebidae
- Subfamily: Arctiinae
- Genus: Damias
- Species: D. biagi

Binomial name
- Damias biagi (Bethune-Baker, 1908)

Synonyms
- Chionaema biagi Bethune-Baker, 1908; Chionaema plagosus Rothschild, 1913

Species of moth

Damias biagi is a moth of the family Erebidae. It is found in New Guinea.
