= Damias scripta =

Scientific classification
- Domain: Eukaryota
- Kingdom: Animalia
- Phylum: Arthropoda
- Class: Insecta
- Order: Lepidoptera
- Superfamily: Noctuoidea
- Family: Erebidae
- Subfamily: Arctiinae
- Genus: Damias
- Species: D. scripta

Binomial name
- Damias scripta (Lower, 1902)

Synonyms
- Caprimima scripta Lower, 1902

Species of moth

Damias scripta is a moth of the family Erebidae first described by Oswald Bertram Lower in 1902. It is found in Australia.
