= Damias postnigra =

Scientific classification
- Domain: Eukaryota
- Kingdom: Animalia
- Phylum: Arthropoda
- Class: Insecta
- Order: Lepidoptera
- Superfamily: Noctuoidea
- Family: Erebidae
- Subfamily: Arctiinae
- Genus: Damias
- Species: D. postnigra

Binomial name
- Damias postnigra Rothschild, 1912

Synonyms
- Scaptesyle postnigra (Rothschild, 1912); Caprimima postnigra Rothschild, 1912

Species of moth

Damias postnigra is a moth of the family Erebidae first described by Walter Rothschild in 1912. It is found in New Guinea.
