= Eschata chrysargyria =

Scientific classification
- Kingdom: Animalia
- Phylum: Arthropoda
- Clade: Pancrustacea
- Class: Insecta
- Order: Lepidoptera
- Family: Crambidae
- Subfamily: Crambinae
- Tribe: Chiloini
- Genus: Eschata
- Species: E. chrysargyria

Binomial name
- Eschata chrysargyria (Walker, 1865)

Synonyms
- Chaerecla chrysargyria Walker, 1865; Eschata chrysargyrea Caradja & Meyrick, 1935

Species of moth

Eschata chrysargyria is a moth in the family Crambidae. It was described by Francis Walker in 1865. It is found in Indonesia, where it has been recorded from Seram.
