= Eschata quadrispinea =

Scientific classification
- Kingdom: Animalia
- Phylum: Arthropoda
- Clade: Pancrustacea
- Class: Insecta
- Order: Lepidoptera
- Family: Crambidae
- Subfamily: Crambinae
- Tribe: Chiloini
- Genus: Eschata
- Species: E. quadrispinea

Binomial name
- Eschata quadrispinea Li in Li & Liu, 2012

Species of moth

Eschata quadrispinea is a moth in the family Crambidae. It was described by Wei-Chun Li in 2012. It has been found in the Jiangxi province of China.
