= Damias marginipuncta =

Scientific classification
- Domain: Eukaryota
- Kingdom: Animalia
- Phylum: Arthropoda
- Class: Insecta
- Order: Lepidoptera
- Superfamily: Noctuoidea
- Family: Erebidae
- Subfamily: Arctiinae
- Genus: Damias
- Species: D. marginipuncta

Binomial name
- Damias marginipuncta (Rothschild, 1912)

Synonyms
- Caprimima marginipuncta Rothschild, 1912

Species of moth

Damias marginipuncta is a moth of the family Erebidae. It is found in New Guinea.
