= Damias bipars =

Scientific classification
- Kingdom: Animalia
- Phylum: Arthropoda
- Class: Insecta
- Order: Lepidoptera
- Superfamily: Noctuoidea
- Family: Erebidae
- Subfamily: Arctiinae
- Genus: Damias
- Species: D. bipars

Binomial name
- Damias bipars (Hampson, 1900)

Synonyms
- Caprimima bipars Hampson, 1900

Species of moth

Damias bipars is a moth of the family Erebidae first described by George Hampson in 1900. It is found on the Solomon Islands.
