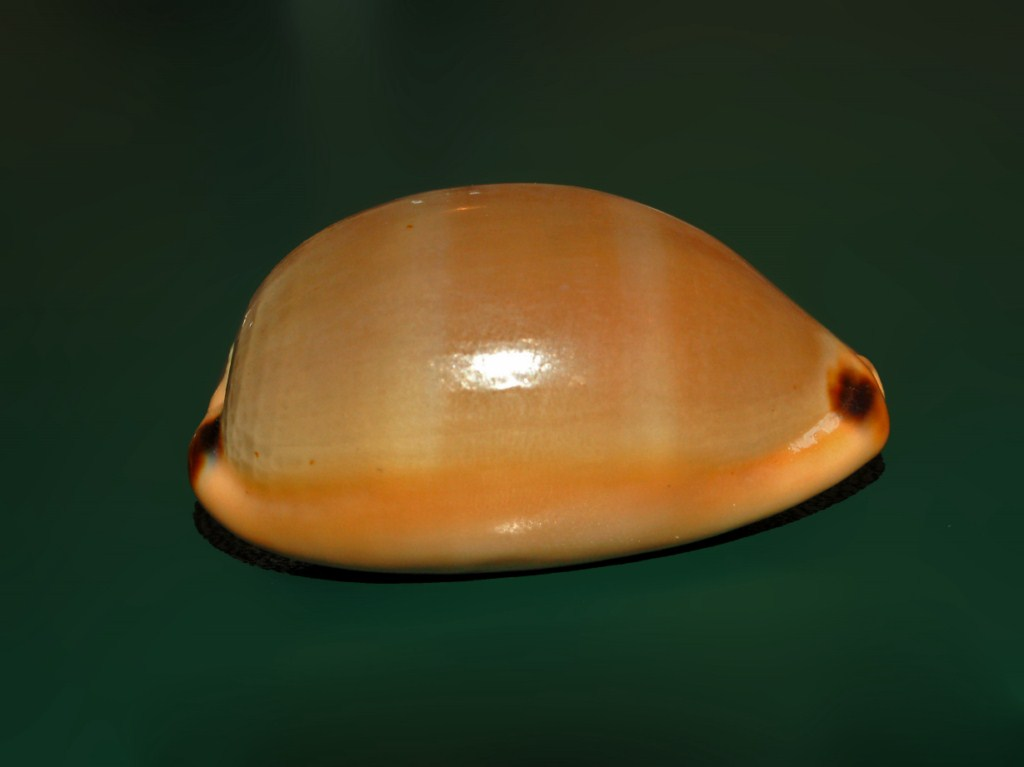

Scientific classification
- Kingdom: Animalia
- Phylum: Mollusca
- Class: Gastropoda
- Subclass: Caenogastropoda
- Order: Littorinimorpha
- Family: Cypraeidae
- Genus: Luria
- Species: L. lurida

Binomial name
- Luria lurida (Linnaeus, 1758)

Synonyms
- See list

= Luria lurida =

Species of gastropod

Luria lurida is a species of sea snail, a cowry, a marine gastropod mollusk in the family Cypraeidae, the cowries.

== Description ==
The shells of Luria lurida reach on average 40–48 millimetres (1.6–1.9 in)of length, with a minimum size of 14 millimetres (0.55 in) and a maximum size of 66 millimetres (2.6 in). The dorsum surface of these elongated, smooth and shiny shells is mainly pale brown or reddish, with three transversal darker bands alternating with narrower clearer bands. At the extremities of the shell there are two separate dark brown spots. The aperture is wide, with several teeth. In the living cowries the mantle is dark brown and may cover the entire shell. The male is usually smaller and elongated than the female.

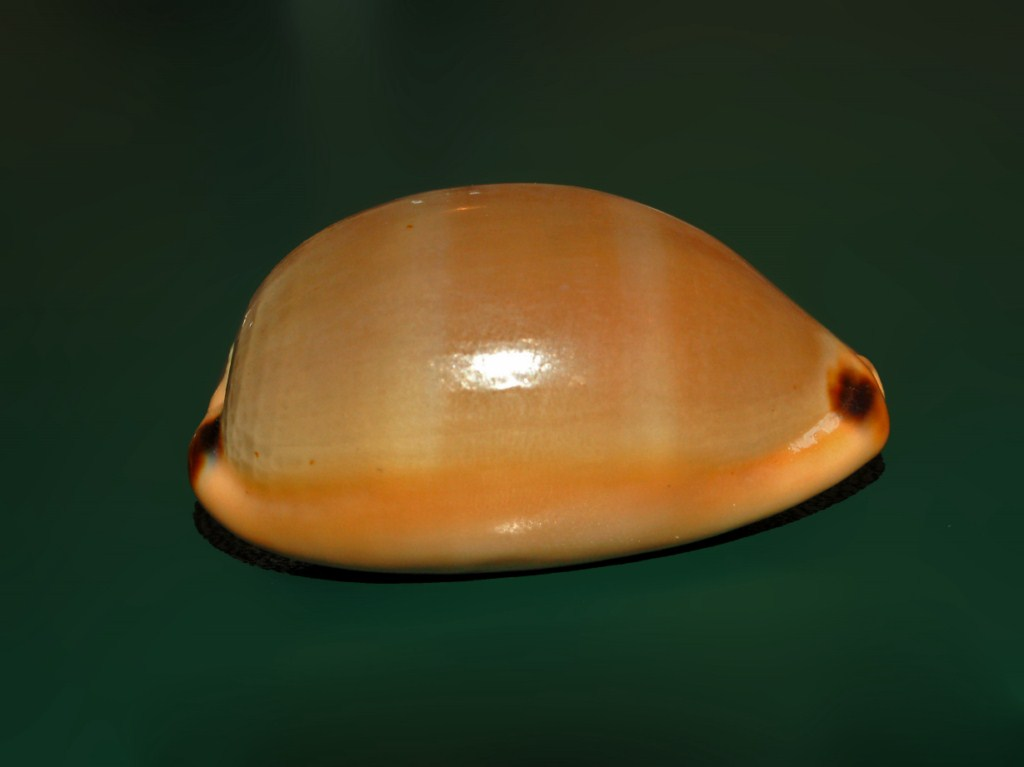
A shell of Luria lurida from Sicily, lateral view, anterior end towards the right

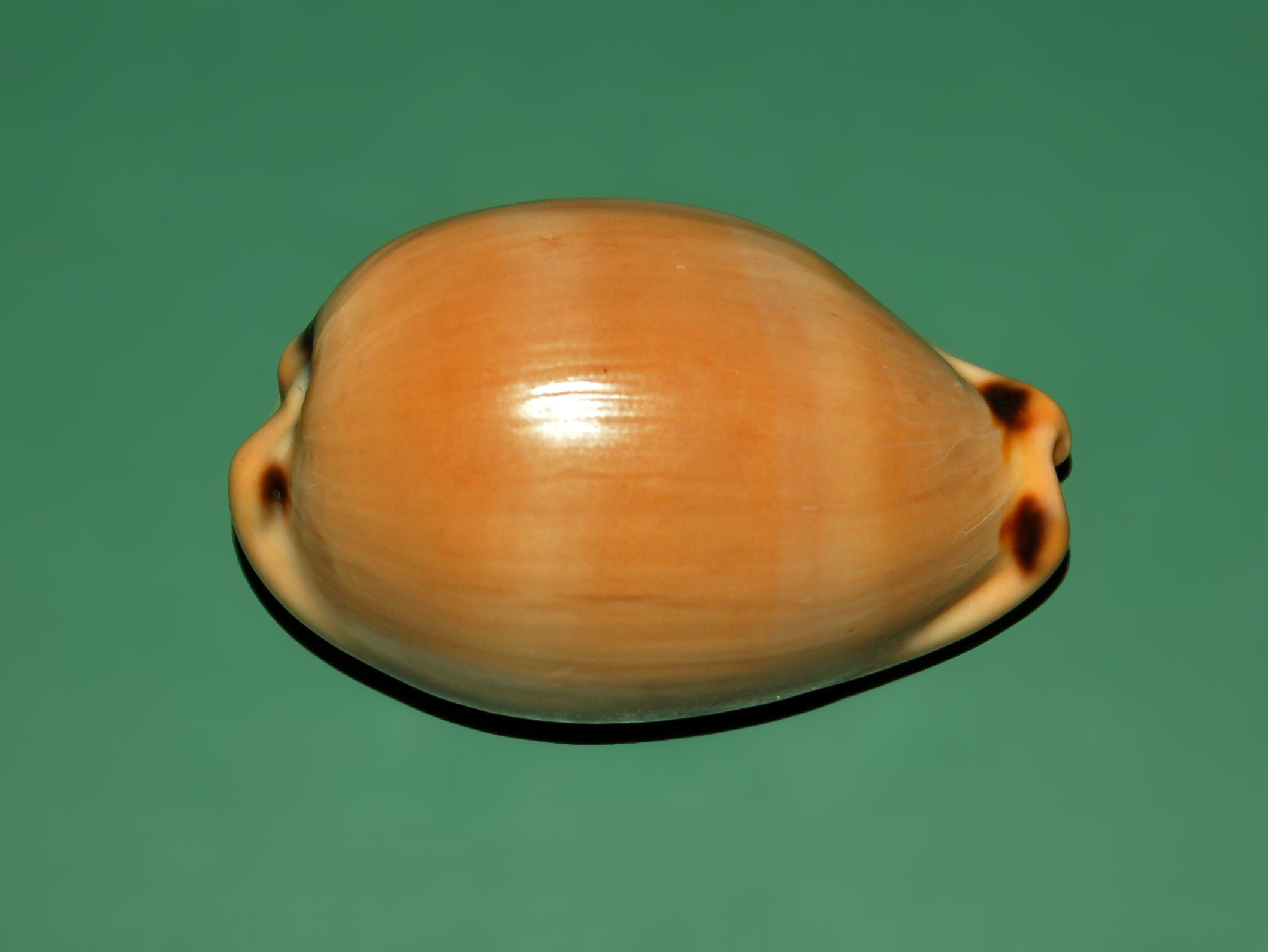
Dorsal view of a shell of Luria lurida from Sicily, dorsal view, anterior end towards the right

== Distribution ==
This common species is distributed in the Mediterranean Sea and in the Atlantic Ocean along Macaronesia and West Africa, mainly in Senegal and Angola.

== Habitat ==
As they fear the light, during the day usually they hide themselves in small caves, crevices or under rocks up to about 40 metres (130 ft) of depth. They live on rocky seabed and corals, feeding during the night mainly on sponges of Verongia aerophoba, Aiplysina aerophoba, Chondrilla nucula and Tethya aurantium.

== Subspecies ==
Three subspecies have been recognized :

- Luria lurida lurida (Linnaeus, 1758)
- Luria lurida minima (Dunker, 1853) (taxon inquirendum)
- Luria lurida oceanica (Schilder, 1930)
- Luria lurida pulchroides Alvardo & Alvarez, 1964 (taxon inquirendum)

== Synonyms ==
- Cypraea amethistina Costa O.G., 1830
- Cypraea aurora Monterosato, 1897
- Cypraea kunthii Audouin, 1826
- Cypraea leucogaster Gmelin, 1791
- Cypraea lurida Linnaeus, 1758 (original combination)
- Cypraea lurida congiunta Settepassi, 1977 (not available, published in a work which does not consistently use binomial nomenclature (ICZN art. 11.4))
- Cypraea lurida elongata Settepassi, 1977 (not available, published in a work which does not consistently use binomial nomenclature (ICZN art. 11.4))
- Cypraea lurida immaculata Settepassi, 1977 (not available, published in a work which does not consistently use binomial nomenclature (ICZN art. 11.4))
- Cypraea lurida oceanica Schilder, 1930
- Cypraea lurida var. albida Costa O.G., 1829
- Cypraea lurida var. brunnea Monterosato, 1897
- Cypraea lurida var. caerulescens Mollerat, 1890
- Cypraea lurida var. cinerea Monterosato, 1897
- Cypraea lurida var. concolor Kobelt, 1906
- Cypraea lurida var. curta Mollerat, 1890
- Cypraea lurida var. cylindrica Mollerat, 1890
- Cypraea lurida var. fasciata Monterosato, 1897
- Cypraea lurida var. fulva Mollerat, 1890
- Cypraea lurida var. major Pallary, 1900
- Cypraea lurida var. maxima Monterosato, 1897
- Cypraea lurida var. media Monterosato, 1897
- Cypraea lurida var. minima Dunker, 1853
- Cypraea lurida var. monochroa Mollerat, 1890
- Cypraea lurida var. monstrosa Gray J.E., 1828
- Cypraea lurida var. nebulosa Monterosato, 1897
- Cypraea lurida var. normalis Monterosato, 1897
- Cypraea lurida var. pubescens Monterosato, 1897
- Cypraea lurida var. rufescens Costa O.G., 1829
- Cypraea lurida var. rufofulva Kobelt, 1906
- Cypraea lurida var. turdicula Monterosato, 1897
- Cypraea lurida var. ventricosa Mollerat, 1890
- Cypraea lurida var. virescens Costa O.G., 1829
- Cypraea lurida var. zonata Mollerat, 1890
- Luria lurida lurida (Linnaeus, 1758)· accepted, alternate representation
- Luria lurida var. badia Coen, 1949
- Luria lurida var. incrassata Coen, 1933
- Luria lurida var. liburnica Coen, 1933
- Luria lurida var. obstructa Coen, 1933
- Luria lurida var. onycina Coen, 1933
- Lurida lurida (Linnaeus, 1758) (misspelling)
- Voluta pumilio Brusina, 1865

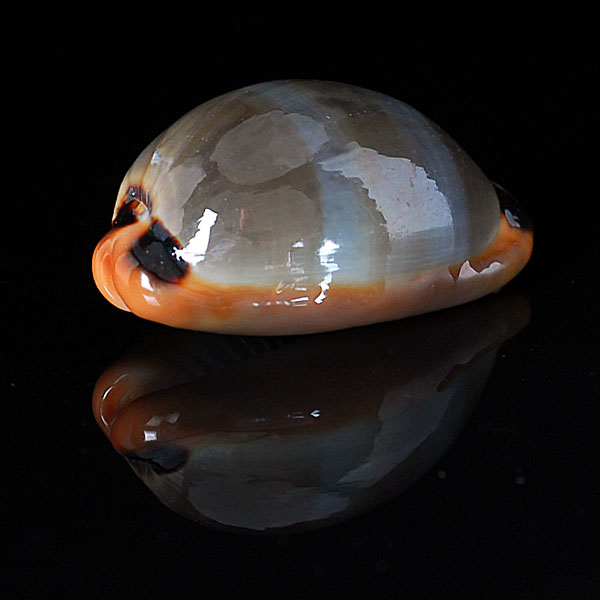
Lateral view of a shell of Luria lurida pulchroides, anterior end to the right

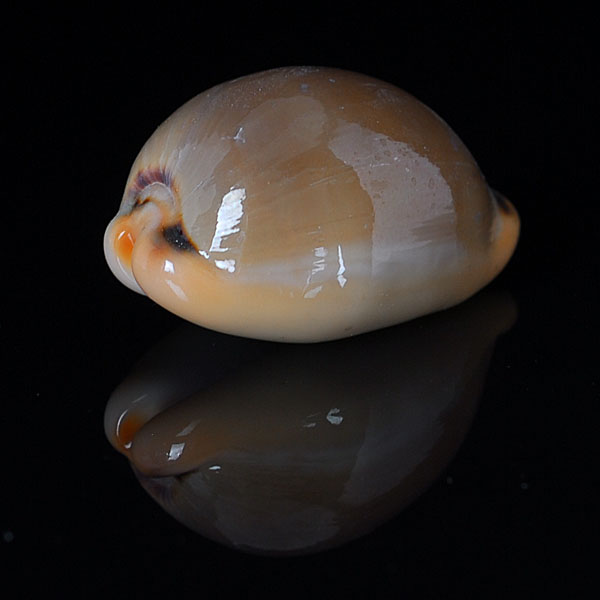
Lateral view of a shell of Luria lurida lurida, anterior end to the right
