= Damias =

Scientific classification
- Domain: Eukaryota
- Kingdom: Animalia
- Phylum: Arthropoda
- Class: Insecta
- Order: Lepidoptera
- Superfamily: Noctuoidea
- Family: Erebidae
- Subfamily: Arctiinae
- Subtribe: Cisthenina
- Genus: Damias; Boisduval, 1832

Synonyms
- Atopomima Meyrick, 1936; Caprimima Hampson, 1900

Genus of moths

Damias is a genus of moths in the family Erebidae. The genus was erected by Jean Baptiste Boisduval in 1832.

== Species ==
- Damias aenea
- Damias albata
- Damias androconiata
- Damias aurantiomarginata
- Damias biagi
- Damias biakensis
- Damias biguttata
- Damias bimaculata
- Damias bipars
- Damias caerulescens
- Damias calida
- Damias catarrhoa
- Damias choiseuli
- Damias coeruleomarginata
- Damias cupreonitens
- Damias elegans
- Damias esthla
- Damias fuliginosa
- Damias germana
- Damias insignis
- Damias isabella
- Damias leptosema
- Damias marginipuncta
- Damias metallica
- Damias mixta
- Damias monoleuca
- Damias obliqua
- Damias occidentalis
- Damias peculiaris
- Damias pelochroa
- Damias peraffinis
- Damias postexpansa
- Damias postnigra
- Damias postvitrea
- Damias procrena
- Damias pseudaffinis
- Damias pseudogelida
- Damias punctata
- Damias quadripuncta
- Damias rotunda
- Damias rufobasalis
- Damias scripta
- Damias shawmayeri
- Damias sicciodes
- Damias simillima
- Damias szetschwana
