= Eschata minuta =

Scientific classification
- Kingdom: Animalia
- Phylum: Arthropoda
- Clade: Pancrustacea
- Class: Insecta
- Order: Lepidoptera
- Family: Crambidae
- Subfamily: Crambinae
- Tribe: Chiloini
- Genus: Eschata
- Species: E. minuta

Binomial name
- Eschata minuta Wang & Sung, 1981

Species of moth

Eschata minuta is a moth in the family Crambidae. It was described by Wang and Sung in 1981. It is found in China.
