= Eschata ochreipes =

Scientific classification
- Kingdom: Animalia
- Phylum: Arthropoda
- Clade: Pancrustacea
- Class: Insecta
- Order: Lepidoptera
- Family: Crambidae
- Subfamily: Crambinae
- Tribe: Chiloini
- Genus: Eschata
- Species: E. ochreipes

Binomial name
- Eschata ochreipes Hampson, 1891

Synonyms
- Eschata ochripes Hampson, 1896

Species of moth

Eschata ochreipes is a moth in the family Crambidae. It was described by George Hampson in 1891. It is found in India.
