= Damias esthla =

Scientific classification
- Kingdom: Animalia
- Phylum: Arthropoda
- Clade: Pancrustacea
- Class: Insecta
- Order: Lepidoptera
- Superfamily: Noctuoidea
- Family: Erebidae
- Subfamily: Arctiinae
- Genus: Damias
- Species: D. esthla

Binomial name
- Damias esthla Prout, 1918

Species of moth

Damias esthla is a moth of the family Erebidae.
