= Damias szetschwana =

Scientific classification
- Domain: Eukaryota
- Kingdom: Animalia
- Phylum: Arthropoda
- Class: Insecta
- Order: Lepidoptera
- Superfamily: Noctuoidea
- Family: Erebidae
- Subfamily: Arctiinae
- Genus: Damias
- Species: D. szetschwana

Binomial name
- Damias szetschwana (Draeseke, 1926)

Synonyms
- Scaptesyle szetschwana Draeseke, 1926

Species of moth

Damias szetschwana is a moth of the family Erebidae. It is found in the province of Sichuan, China.
