= Damias punctata =

Scientific classification
- Domain: Eukaryota
- Kingdom: Animalia
- Phylum: Arthropoda
- Class: Insecta
- Order: Lepidoptera
- Superfamily: Noctuoidea
- Family: Erebidae
- Subfamily: Arctiinae
- Genus: Damias
- Species: D. punctata

Binomial name
- Damias punctata (Rothschild, 1936)

Synonyms
- Caprimima punctata Rothschild, 1936

Species of moth

Damias punctata is a moth of the family Erebidae first described by Walter Rothschild in 1936. It is found in New Guinea.
