= Damias elegans =

Scientific classification
- Domain: Eukaryota
- Kingdom: Animalia
- Phylum: Arthropoda
- Class: Insecta
- Order: Lepidoptera
- Superfamily: Noctuoidea
- Family: Erebidae
- Subfamily: Arctiinae
- Genus: Damias
- Species: D. elegans

Binomial name
- Damias elegans Boisduval, 1832

Synonyms
- Damias elegans Boisduval, 1832; Hypocrita albicollis Pagenstecher, 1886; Caprimima mendax Rothschild & Jordan, 1901; Caprima gelida Hampson, 1900

Species of insect

Damias elegans is a moth of the family Erebidae first described by Jean Baptiste Boisduval in 1832. It is found in Australia (Queensland), New Guinea and on Waigiou, Aru and the Trobriand Islands.
