= Damias obliqua =

Scientific classification
- Domain: Eukaryota
- Kingdom: Animalia
- Phylum: Arthropoda
- Class: Insecta
- Order: Lepidoptera
- Superfamily: Noctuoidea
- Family: Erebidae
- Subfamily: Arctiinae
- Genus: Damias
- Species: D. obliqua

Binomial name
- Damias obliqua (Rothschild & Jordan, 1901)

Synonyms
- Caprimima obliqua Rothschild & Jordan, 1901

Species of moth

Damias obliqua is a moth of the family Erebidae first described by Rothschild and Jordan in 1901. It is found in New Guinea.
