= Damias choiseuli =

Scientific classification
- Domain: Eukaryota
- Kingdom: Animalia
- Phylum: Arthropoda
- Class: Insecta
- Order: Lepidoptera
- Superfamily: Noctuoidea
- Family: Erebidae
- Subfamily: Arctiinae
- Genus: Damias
- Species: D. choiseuli

Binomial name
- Damias choiseuli (Jordan, 1904)

Synonyms
- Caprimima choiseuli Jordan, 1904

Species of moth

Damias choiseuli is a moth of the family Erebidae. It is found on the Solomon Islands.
