= Eschata xanthorhyncha =

Scientific classification
- Kingdom: Animalia
- Phylum: Arthropoda
- Clade: Pancrustacea
- Class: Insecta
- Order: Lepidoptera
- Family: Crambidae
- Subfamily: Crambinae
- Tribe: Chiloini
- Genus: Eschata
- Species: E. xanthorhyncha

Binomial name
- Eschata xanthorhyncha Hampson, 1896

Species of moth

Eschata xanthorhyncha is a moth in the family Crambidae. It was described by George Hampson in 1896. It is found in Sri Lanka.

== Description ==
Its wingspan is about 32 mm. The forewings have a somewhat produced and acute apex. In the male, the head and thorax are whitish. Palpi orange, banded with white. Forelegs orange fringed with white. Tarsi banded with orange. Forewings with area between the postmedial and submarginal lines evenly irrorated (sprinkled) with black scales. Hindwings fuscous black. Cilia whitish. Ventral side with basal two-thirds of wings suffused with fuscous black.
