= Eschata melanocera =

Scientific classification
- Kingdom: Animalia
- Phylum: Arthropoda
- Clade: Pancrustacea
- Class: Insecta
- Order: Lepidoptera
- Family: Crambidae
- Subfamily: Crambinae
- Tribe: Chiloini
- Genus: Eschata
- Species: E. melanocera

Binomial name
- Eschata melanocera Hampson, 1896

Species of moth

Eschata melanocera is a moth in the family Crambidae. It was described by George Hampson in 1896. It is found in India.
