= Damias mixta =

Scientific classification
- Kingdom: Animalia
- Phylum: Arthropoda
- Class: Insecta
- Order: Lepidoptera
- Superfamily: Noctuoidea
- Family: Erebidae
- Subfamily: Arctiinae
- Genus: Damias
- Species: D. mixta

Binomial name
- Damias mixta (Hampson, 1900)

Synonyms
- Caprimima mixta Hampson, 1900; Scaptesyle callida Swinhoe, 1892 (preocc. Walker, 1865)

Species of moth

Damias mixta is a moth of the family Erebidae first described by George Hampson in 1900. It is found on Misool and in New Guinea.
