= Damias albata =

Scientific classification
- Domain: Eukaryota
- Kingdom: Animalia
- Phylum: Arthropoda
- Class: Insecta
- Order: Lepidoptera
- Superfamily: Noctuoidea
- Family: Erebidae
- Subfamily: Arctiinae
- Genus: Damias
- Species: D. albata

Binomial name
- Damias albata (Jordan, 1905)

Synonyms
- Neoscaptia albata Jordan, 1905

Species of moth

Damias albata is a moth of the family Erebidae first described by Karl Jordan in 1905. It is found in New Guinea.
