= Eschata gelida =

Scientific classification
- Kingdom: Animalia
- Phylum: Arthropoda
- Clade: Pancrustacea
- Class: Insecta
- Order: Lepidoptera
- Family: Crambidae
- Subfamily: Crambinae
- Tribe: Chiloini
- Genus: Eschata
- Species: E. gelida

Binomial name
- Eschata gelida Walker, 1856

Species of moth

Eschata gelida is a moth in the family Crambidae. It was described by Francis Walker in 1856. It is found in Sikkim and Darjeeling in India.
