= Damias leptosema =

Scientific classification
- Domain: Eukaryota
- Kingdom: Animalia
- Phylum: Arthropoda
- Class: Insecta
- Order: Lepidoptera
- Superfamily: Noctuoidea
- Family: Erebidae
- Subfamily: Arctiinae
- Genus: Damias
- Species: D. leptosema

Binomial name
- Damias leptosema (Turner, 1940)

Synonyms
- Caprimima leptosema Turner, 1940

Species of moth

Damias leptosema is a moth of the family Erebidae first described by Alfred Jefferis Turner in 1940. It is found in Australia.
