= Damias procrena =

Scientific classification
- Kingdom: Animalia
- Phylum: Arthropoda
- Class: Insecta
- Order: Lepidoptera
- Superfamily: Noctuoidea
- Family: Erebidae
- Subfamily: Arctiinae
- Genus: Damias
- Species: D. procrena

Binomial name
- Damias procrena (Meyrick, 1886)

Synonyms
- Chiriphe procrena Meyrick, 1886

Species of moth

Damias procrena, the procrena footman, is a moth of the family Erebidae. The species was first described by Edward Meyrick in 1886. It is found in the Australian states of Victoria and Tasmania.
