= Damias germana =

Scientific classification
- Domain: Eukaryota
- Kingdom: Animalia
- Phylum: Arthropoda
- Class: Insecta
- Order: Lepidoptera
- Superfamily: Noctuoidea
- Family: Erebidae
- Subfamily: Arctiinae
- Genus: Damias
- Species: D. germana

Binomial name
- Damias germana (Rothschild, 1912)

Synonyms
- Caprimima germana Rothschild, 1912

Species of moth

Damias germana is a moth of the family Erebidae first described by Walter Rothschild in 1912. It is found in New Guinea.
