= Damias pelochroa =

Scientific classification
- Kingdom: Animalia
- Phylum: Arthropoda
- Class: Insecta
- Order: Lepidoptera
- Superfamily: Noctuoidea
- Family: Erebidae
- Subfamily: Arctiinae
- Genus: Damias
- Species: D. pelochroa

Binomial name
- Damias pelochroa (Hampson, 1914)

Synonyms
- Caprimima pelochroa Hampson, 1914

Species of moth

Damias pelochroa is a moth of the family Erebidae first described by George Hampson in 1914. It is found in Australia.
