= Damias aenea =

Scientific classification
- Domain: Eukaryota
- Kingdom: Animalia
- Phylum: Arthropoda
- Class: Insecta
- Order: Lepidoptera
- Superfamily: Noctuoidea
- Family: Erebidae
- Subfamily: Arctiinae
- Genus: Damias
- Species: D. aenea

Binomial name
- Damias aenea (Jordan, 1905)

Synonyms
- Caprimima aenea Jordan, 1905

Species of moth

Damias aenea is a moth of the family Erebidae. It is found in New Guinea.
