= Eschata smithi =

Scientific classification
- Kingdom: Animalia
- Phylum: Arthropoda
- Clade: Pancrustacea
- Class: Insecta
- Order: Lepidoptera
- Family: Crambidae
- Subfamily: Crambinae
- Tribe: Chiloini
- Genus: Eschata
- Species: E. smithi

Binomial name
- Eschata smithi Błeszyński, 1970

Species of moth

Eschata smithi is a moth in the family Crambidae. It was described by Stanisław Błeszyński in 1970. It is found in Thailand.
