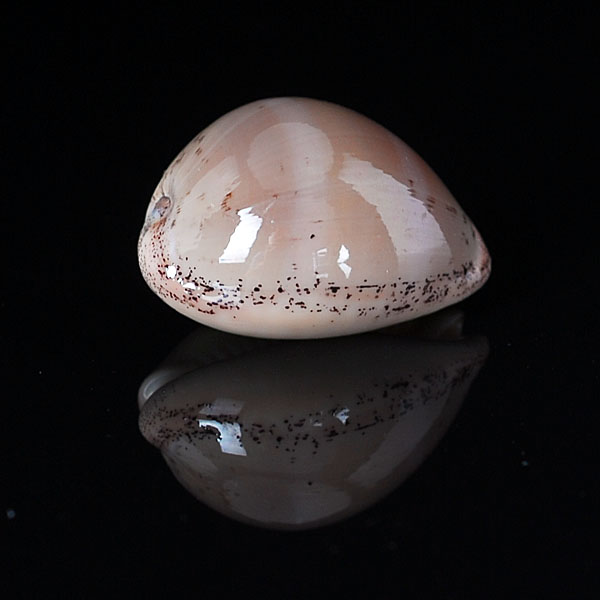
- A dorso-lateral view of a shell of Luria cinerea, anterior end towards the right

Scientific classification
- Kingdom: Animalia
- Phylum: Mollusca
- Class: Gastropoda
- Subclass: Caenogastropoda
- Order: Littorinimorpha
- Family: Cypraeidae
- Genus: Luria
- Species: L. cinerea

Binomial name
- Luria cinerea (Gmelin, 1791)

Synonyms
- Cypraea cinerea Gmelin, 1791 (Basionym); Cypraea cinerea cinerea Gmelin, 1791 (original combination); Luria cinerea cinerea (Gmelin, 1791)· accepted, alternate representation; Sinusigera cancellata d'Orbigny, 1853 (name based on a larval shell)

= Luria cinerea =

Species of gastropod

Luria cinerea, common name, the Atlantic gray cowry, is a species of sea snail, a cowry, a marine gastropod mollusk in the family Cypraeidae, the cowries.

Subspecies
Luria cinerea brasilensis Lorenz, 2002 (taxon inquirendum)

== Distribution ==
N Carolina, USA - Colombia - E Brazil

== Description ==
The maximum recorded shell length is 45 mm.

== Habitat ==
Minimum recorded depth is 0 m. Maximum recorded depth is 1472 m.
