= Eschata percandida =

Scientific classification
- Kingdom: Animalia
- Phylum: Arthropoda
- Clade: Pancrustacea
- Class: Insecta
- Order: Lepidoptera
- Family: Crambidae
- Subfamily: Crambinae
- Tribe: Chiloini
- Genus: Eschata
- Species: E. percandida

Binomial name
- Eschata percandida C. Swinhoe, 1890

Species of moth

Eschata percandida is a moth in the family Crambidae. It was described by Charles Swinhoe in 1890. It is found in India.
