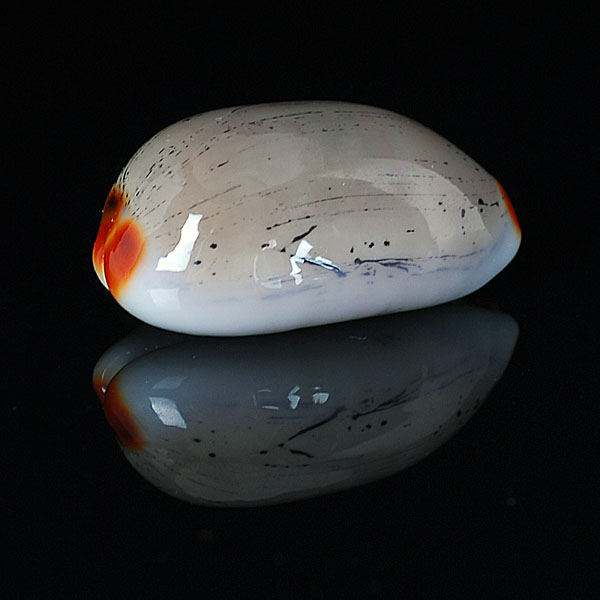
- A lateral view of the shell of Luria isabella, anterior end towards the right

Scientific classification
- Kingdom: Animalia
- Phylum: Mollusca
- Class: Gastropoda
- Subclass: Caenogastropoda
- Order: Littorinimorpha
- Superfamily: Cypraeoidea
- Family: Cypraeidae
- Genus: Luria; Jousseaume, 1884

Type species
- Cypraea lurida Linnaeus, 1758

Synonyms
- Basilitrona Iredale, 1930; Luria (Basilitrona) Iredale, 1930; Luria (Luria) Jousseaume, 1884· accepted, alternate representation; Luria (Tessellata) Jousseaume, 1884· accepted, alternate representation; Tessellata Jousseaume, 1884

= Luria (gastropod) =

Genus of gastropods

Luria is a genus of sea snails, marine gastropod molluscs in the subfamily Luriinae of the family Cypraeidae, the cowries.

== Species ==
Species within the genus Luria include:

- Luria cahuzaci Dolin & Lozouet, 2004 †
- Luria castinea Dolin & Lozouet, 2004 †
- Luria chattica Dolin & Lozouet, 2004 †
- Luria cinerea Gmelin, 1791)
- Luria controversa Gray, 1824
- Luria diluviana (Gray, 1824) †
- Luria dockeryi Dolin & Lozouet, 2004 †
- Luria fossula (Ingram, 1947) †
- Luria grateloupi (d'Orbigny, 1852) †
- Luria hieroglyphica (Schilder, 1923) †
- Luria isabella (Linnaeus, 1758)
- Luria isabellamexicana (Stearns, 1893)
- Luria lurida (Linnaeus, 1758)
- Luria pelouaensis Dolin & Lozouet, 2004 †
- Luria pseudotalpa Dolin & Lozouet, 2004 †
- Luria pulchra (Gray, 1824)
- Luria taurorotunda (Sacco, 1894) †
- Luria tessellata (Swainson, 1822)

Species brought into synonymy

- Luria gilvella Lorenz, 2002: synonym of Luria isabella (Linnaeus, 1758)
