= Isabella (Maris painting) =

1906 painting by Simon Maris

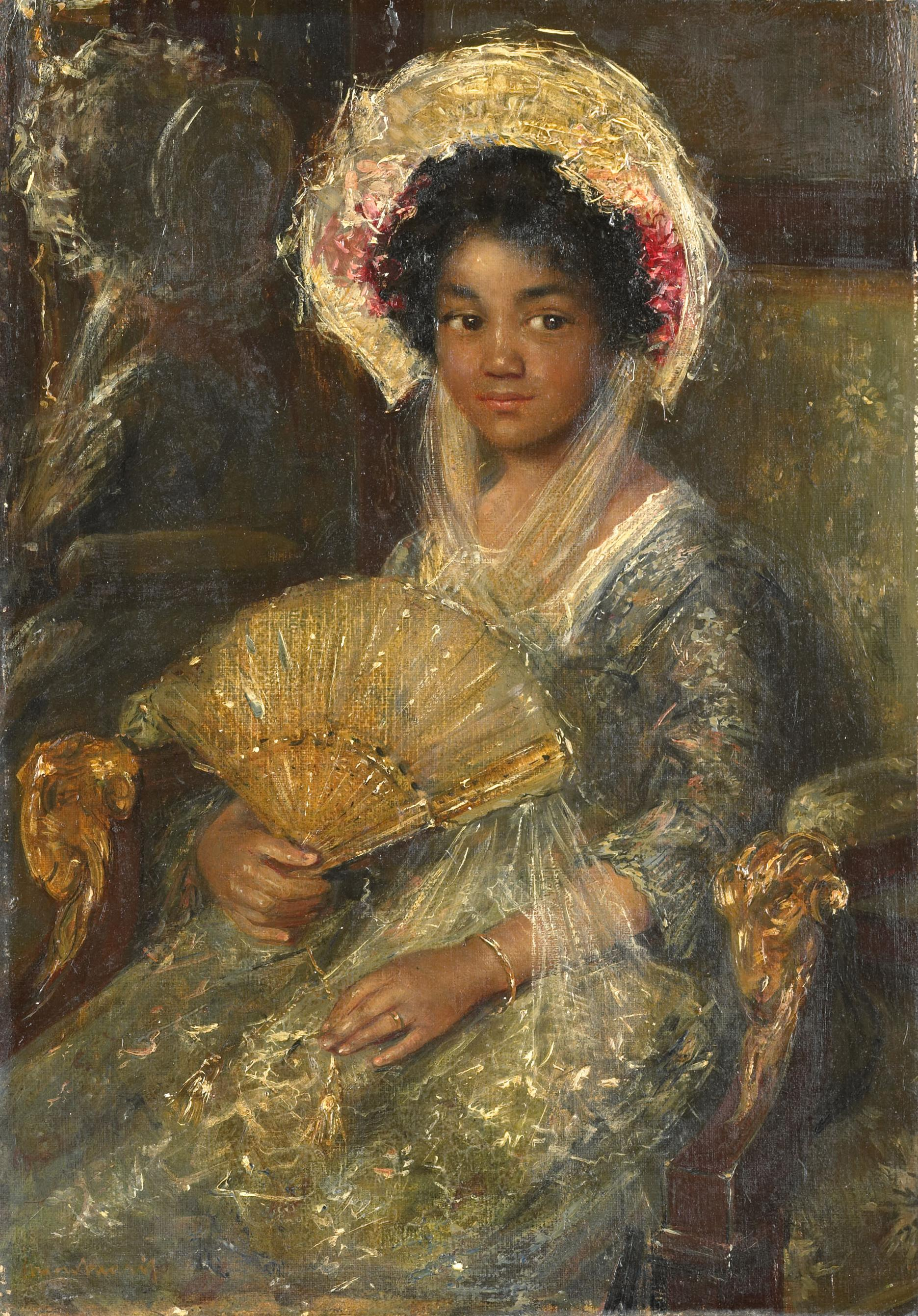
- Artist: Simon Willem Maris
- Year: 1906
- Medium: Oil on canvas
- Subject: Isabella
- Dimensions: 41 cm × 29 cm × 11 cm (16 in × 11 in × 4.3 in)
- Location: Rijksmuseum, Amsterdam
- Accession: SK-A-2931

Isabella, also known as Young Woman with a Fan, is a 1906 painting by Simon Maris. It is currently in the collection of the Rijksmuseum in Amsterdam, Netherlands.

== Description ==
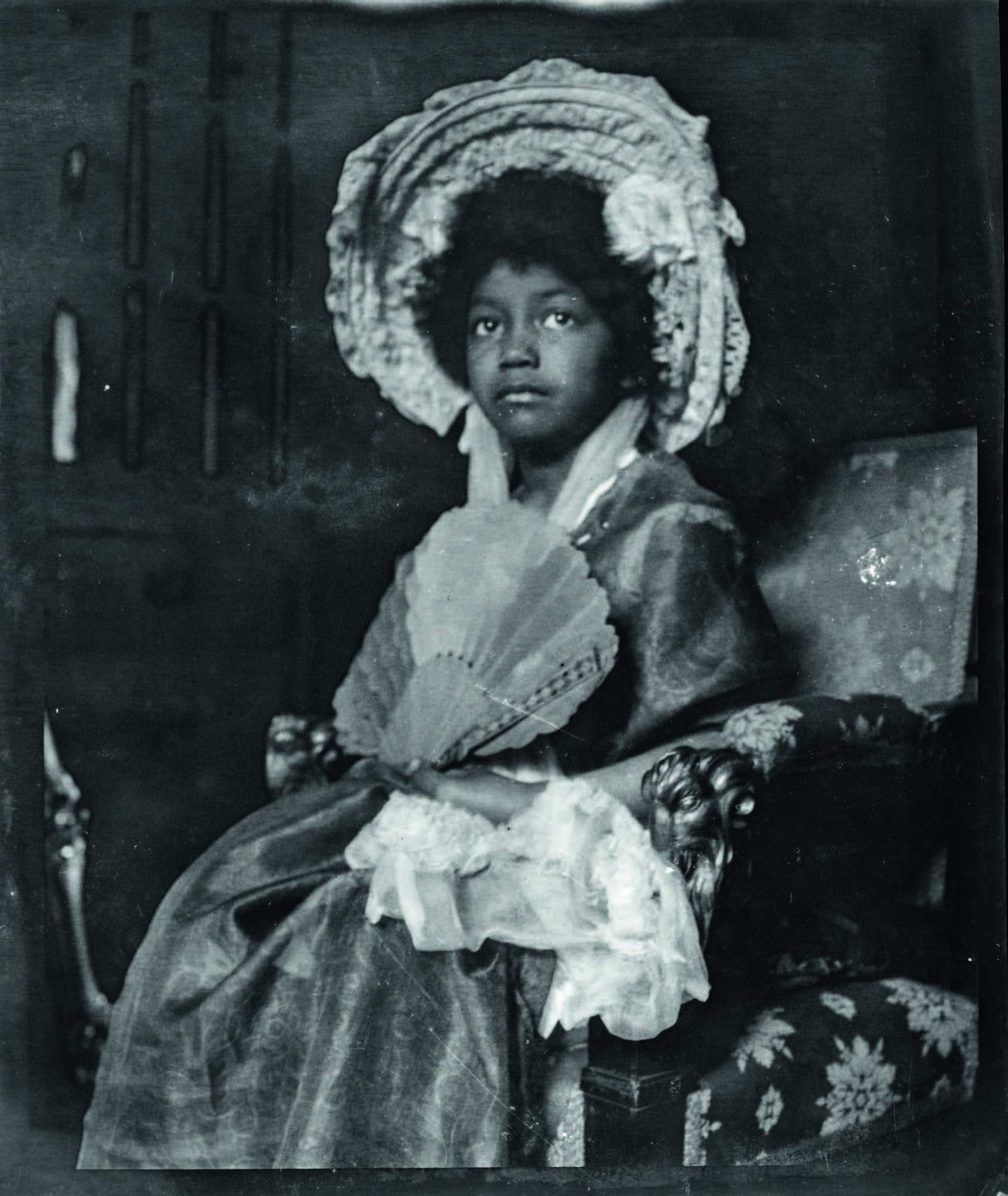
Photograph of Isabella in Simon Maris' studio, 1906, Negative, 124 x 101 mm. The Hague, Simon Maris and Family Archives.

The artwork measures 41 by 29 cm, and is composed of oil paint on canvas. The portrait shows a twelve-year-old girl known only as Isabella, posing in Maris' studio at 498 Keizersgracht, Amsterdam. She is sitting in a wooden cushioned armchair, with goat heads carved into the armrests. The subject is holding a fan in her right hand, and her left hand is touching the fan's golden tassel. Her left arm is jewelled with a golden bracelet and her ring finger displays a golden ring. She is wearing a "sumptuous" blue and green dress, and a white and red bonnet on her head. In the background, a mirror can be seen baring her reflection, showcasing the rear of the bonnet and dress.

== Other versions ==
There are multiple renditions of Isabella, also painted by Simon Maris in 1906. The first, titled Portrait of Mrs Allwood with a Fan, is currently held by a private collector and was originally acquired by the De Visscher family of Zeist in the 1920s. Another version, also titled Isabella, is in the possession of Sally Schuman after her grandmother, Anna Maria Lagaay, received the painting from Maris around 1906. Its current location is unknown.

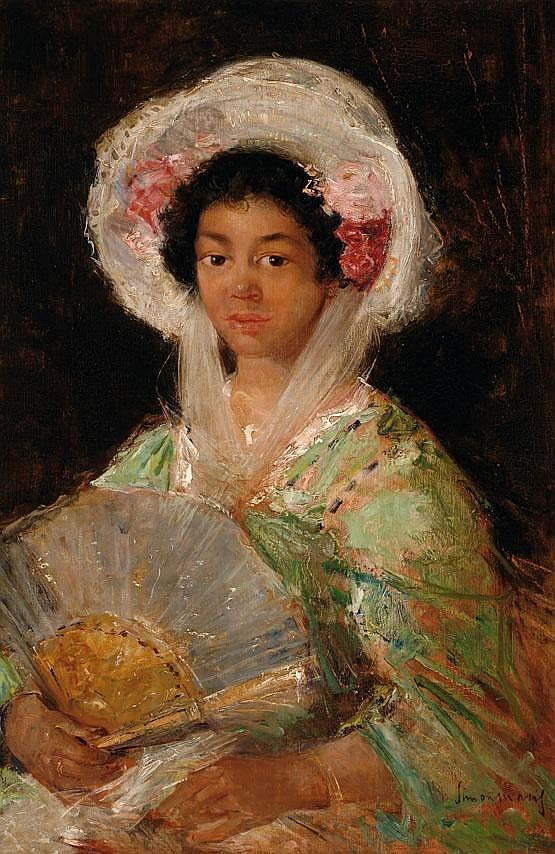
Simon Maris, 1906, Mrs Allwood with a Fan, oil on canvas, 86.5 x 57.5 cm, Private collection.

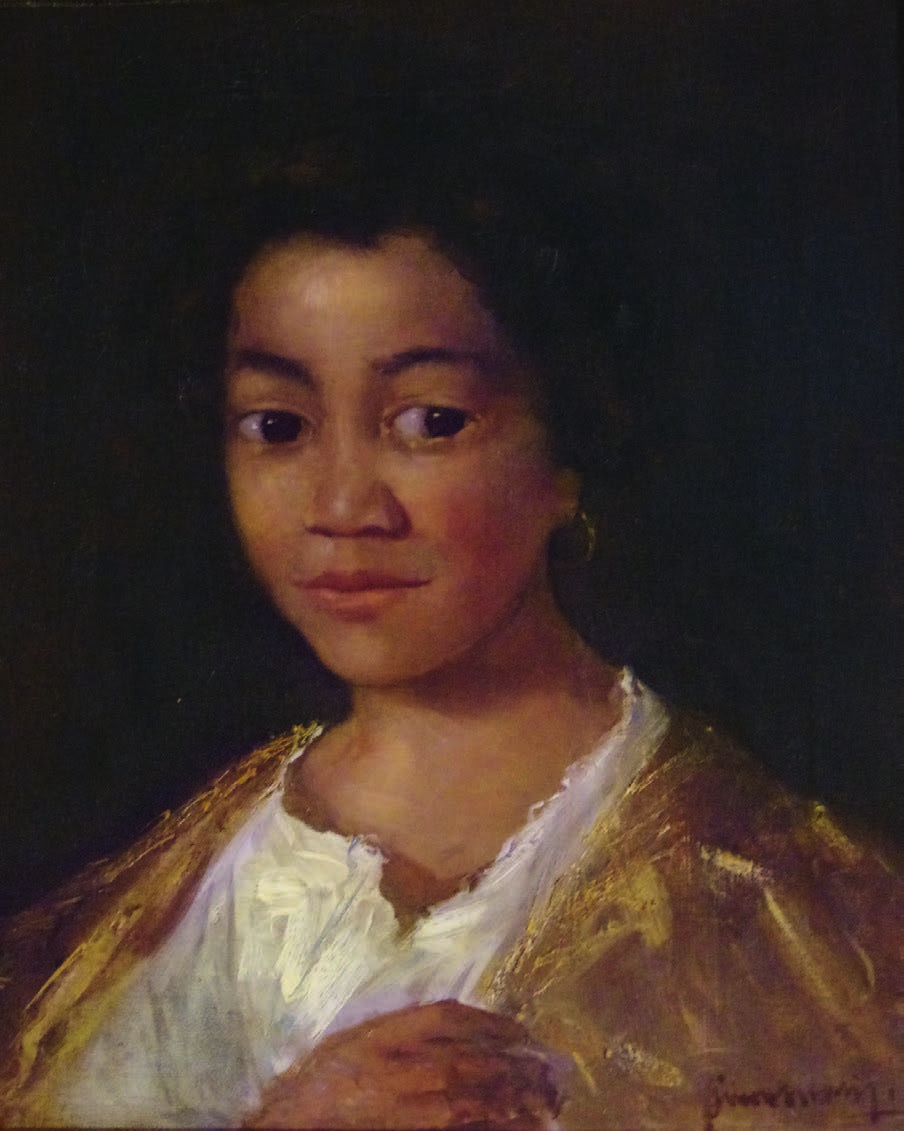
Simon Maris, 1906, Isabella, oil on canvas, 61 x 43.2 cm, Sally Schuman private collection.

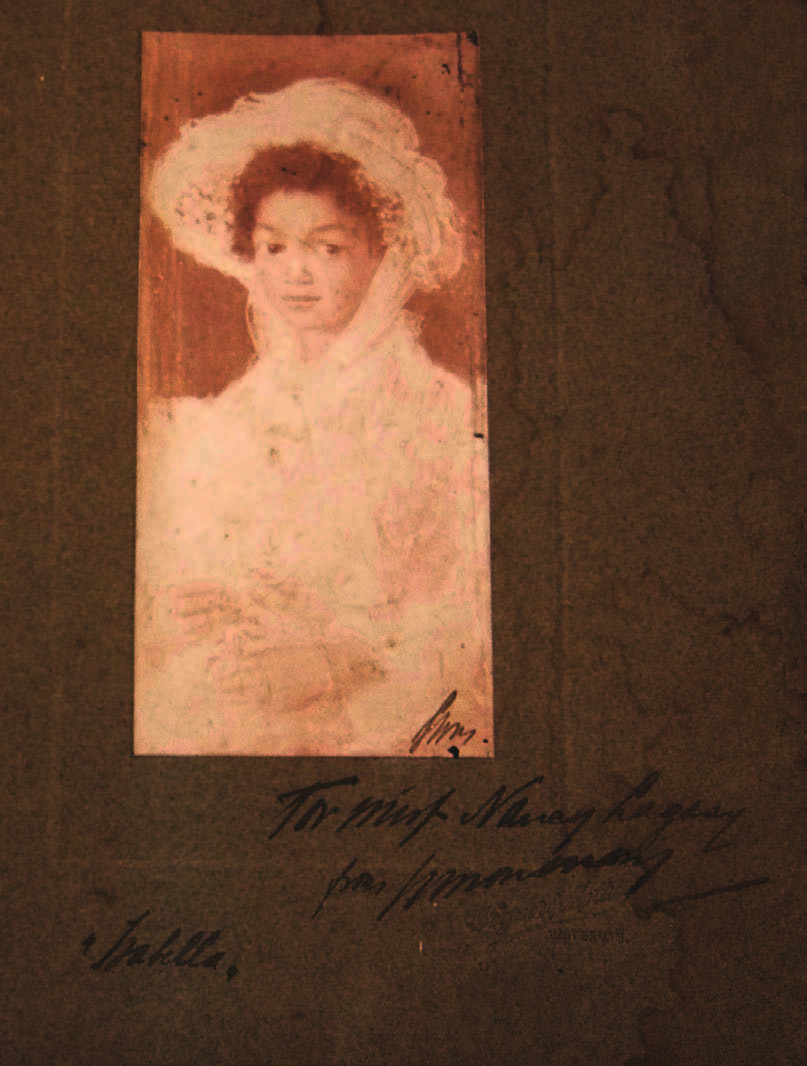
A card featuring a reproduction of Isabella, sent in a 1907 letter by Simon Maris.

== Dispute over naming of artwork ==
In 2015, the Rijksmuseum announced it would be changing the titles of a number of paintings in its collection, citing racial sensitivity. Among these works was a portrait of a young black woman by Simon Maris, titled "Young Negro-Girl", which was retrospectively changed to "Young Woman with a Fan". The project, which expected to change the descriptions or titles of over 220,000 artworks, was the subject of a debate over the importance of preserving historical context versus maximising cultural sensitivity.

The subject in the painting had previously been described by the art dealer Jan C. Schuller as "little negress" during an exhibition in 1908. A newspaper at the time described the portrait as "the superbly painted 'Little Negress' of very distinguished colouring and conception and with fine painting of the fabric of the clothes and of the fan."

The name of the painting intended by Maris himself was revealed in a 1907 letter, where he labeled the piece "Isabella (negress)", along with an inscription on an early version of the artwork that titles it as simply "Isabella". Due to this discovery, the Rijksmuseum once again renamed the portrait in 2020, from the revised title of "Young Woman with a Fan" to its current name "Isabella".
