= Isabella, Pennsylvania =

Isabella, Pennsylvania may refer to the following populated places:

- Isabella, Chester County, Pennsylvania
- Isabella, Fayette County, Pennsylvania
