= Platygraphis =

Scientific classification
- Domain: Eukaryota
- Kingdom: Animalia
- Phylum: Arthropoda
- Class: Insecta
- Order: Lepidoptera
- Family: Crambidae
- Subfamily: Spilomelinae
- Genus: Platygraphis; Dyar, 1918
- Species: P. isabella

Binomial name
- Platygraphis isabella Dyar, 1918

Genus of moths

Platygraphis is a monotypic moth genus of the family Crambidae described by Harrison Gray Dyar Jr. in 1918. Its only species, Platygraphis isabella, described in the same paper, is found in Mexico.

The wingspan is about 16 mm. The forewings are white, with a brown subbasal line and an inner oblique line in the reverse direction. There is an orbicular of two brown bars, filled with fulvous. The reniform consists of two opposed arcs between the subcostal and median veins, filled with fulvous, which colour also occupies the costa, the terminal area and the tornal region. The hindwings are white, with a median line which is forked on the cell and filled with fulvous. The subterminal and marginal lines run parallel to the margin and are filled with fulvous.
