= Isabella (surname) =

Isabella is a surname. Notable people with the surname include:

- Andy Isabella (born 1996), American football player
- Fred Isabella (1917–2007), American dentist and politician
- Kira Isabella (born 1993), Canadian country music singer-songwriter
- Mia Isabella (fl. 2005–2014), American pornographic actress
- Tony Isabella (born 1951), American comic book writer, editor, artist and critic
