= Damias isabella =

Scientific classification
- Domain: Eukaryota
- Kingdom: Animalia
- Phylum: Arthropoda
- Class: Insecta
- Order: Lepidoptera
- Superfamily: Noctuoidea
- Family: Erebidae
- Subfamily: Arctiinae
- Genus: Damias
- Species: D. isabella

Binomial name
- Damias isabella (Rothschild & Jordan, 1901)

Synonyms
- Caprimima isabella Rothschild & Jordan, 1901

Species of moth

Damias isabella is a moth of the family Erebidae. It is found on the Solomon Islands.
