= Eschata isabella =

Scientific classification
- Kingdom: Animalia
- Phylum: Arthropoda
- Clade: Pancrustacea
- Class: Insecta
- Order: Lepidoptera
- Family: Crambidae
- Subfamily: Crambinae
- Tribe: Chiloini
- Genus: Eschata
- Species: E. isabella

Binomial name
- Eschata isabella Błeszyński, 1965

Species of moth

Eschata isabella is a moth in the family Crambidae. It was described by Stanisław Błeszyński in 1965. It is found in Sichuan, China.Savela, Markku. "Eschata Walker, 1856". Lepidoptera and Some Other Life Forms.
