= Isabela =

Isabela may refer to:

== People with the given name ==
- Isabela Boscov, Brazilian film critic
- Isabela Corona (1913–1993), Mexican actress
- Isabela Garcia (born 1967), Brazilian actress
- Isabela Moraes (born 1980), Brazilian synchronized swimmer
- Isabela de Rosis (1842–1911), Italian noblewoman
- Isabela Merced (born 2001), American actress

== Places ==
=== Dominican Republic ===
- Isabela River, a river
- La Isabela, a town in Puerto Plata province;, first European settlement in the New World
- La Isabela International Airport, an airport in the Santo Domingo province
- Villa Isabela, a town in the Puerto Plata province

=== Philippines ===
- Isabela (province), a province in the Cagayan Valley Region, Luzon
  - Isabela State University, an educational institution in the province
- Isabela, Basilan, a city in the Basilan province
- Isabela, Negros Occidental, a municipality in the Negros Occidental province

=== Elsewhere ===
- Isabela de Sagua (or Isabela), a seaside village in Villa Clara Province, Cuba
- Isabela Island (Galápagos), an island in the Galápagos, Ecuador
- Isabela, Puerto Rico, a municipality in Puerto Rico

== Other uses ==
- Isabela oriole, a bird found on Luzon, Philippines
- Isabela (Dragon Age), a character in the Dragon Age media franchise
- Isabela Madrigal, fictional character from the film Encanto

== See also ==
- Isabel (disambiguation)
- Isabella (disambiguation)
- Isabelle (disambiguation)
