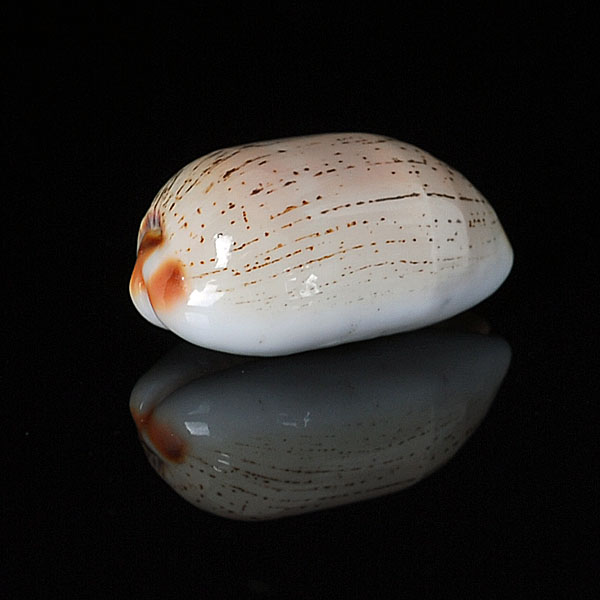

Scientific classification
- Kingdom: Animalia
- Phylum: Mollusca
- Class: Gastropoda
- Subclass: Caenogastropoda
- Order: Littorinimorpha
- Family: Cypraeidae
- Genus: Luria
- Species: L. controversa

Binomial name
- Luria controversa Gray, 1824

Synonyms
- Luria isabella controversa; Cypraea controversa Menke K.T., 1829

= Luria controversa =

Species of gastropod

Luria controversa, the 'Controversial Isabella', is a species of cowry, a sea snail, a marine gastropod mollusk in the family Cypraeidae, the cowries.

Some specialists consider Luria controversa a valid species (F. A. Schilder), while other authors (Felix Lorenz) regard this cowry as just a subspecies of Luria isabella (Luria isabella var. controversa).

== Description ==
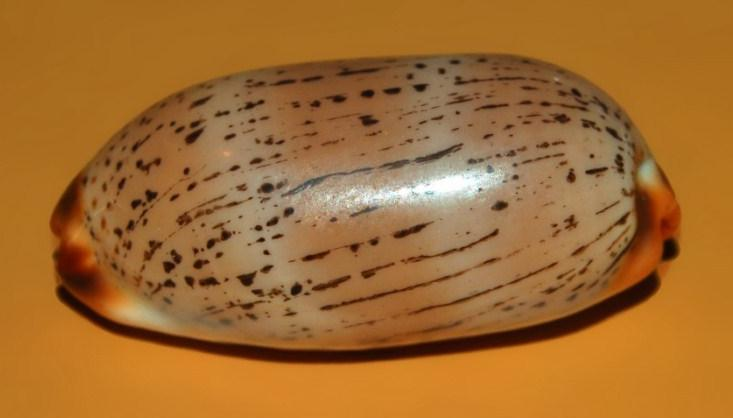
Luria controversa, side view

The shells of this species reach 10–50 millimetres (0.39–1.97 in) of length. They are smooth and elongate, the dorsum is pale brown, with slight longitudinal markings, dark brown or black terminals, and a flat white base.

== Distribution and habitat ==
This species is found throughout the tropical West Pacific Ocean, in seas along Oceania, Polynesia, Hawaii, Midway, Society Islands and Easter Island, in intertidal shallow waters at 10–20 metres (33–66 ft) of depth. The 'Controversial Isabella' frequently occurs in the lagoon of islands and it is active at night, while during day it hides under plates of dead coral or under rocks in cracks and crevices.
