= Lake Isabella Historic Residential District =

Historic district in Florida, United States

- U.S. National Register of Historic Places
- U.S. Historic district
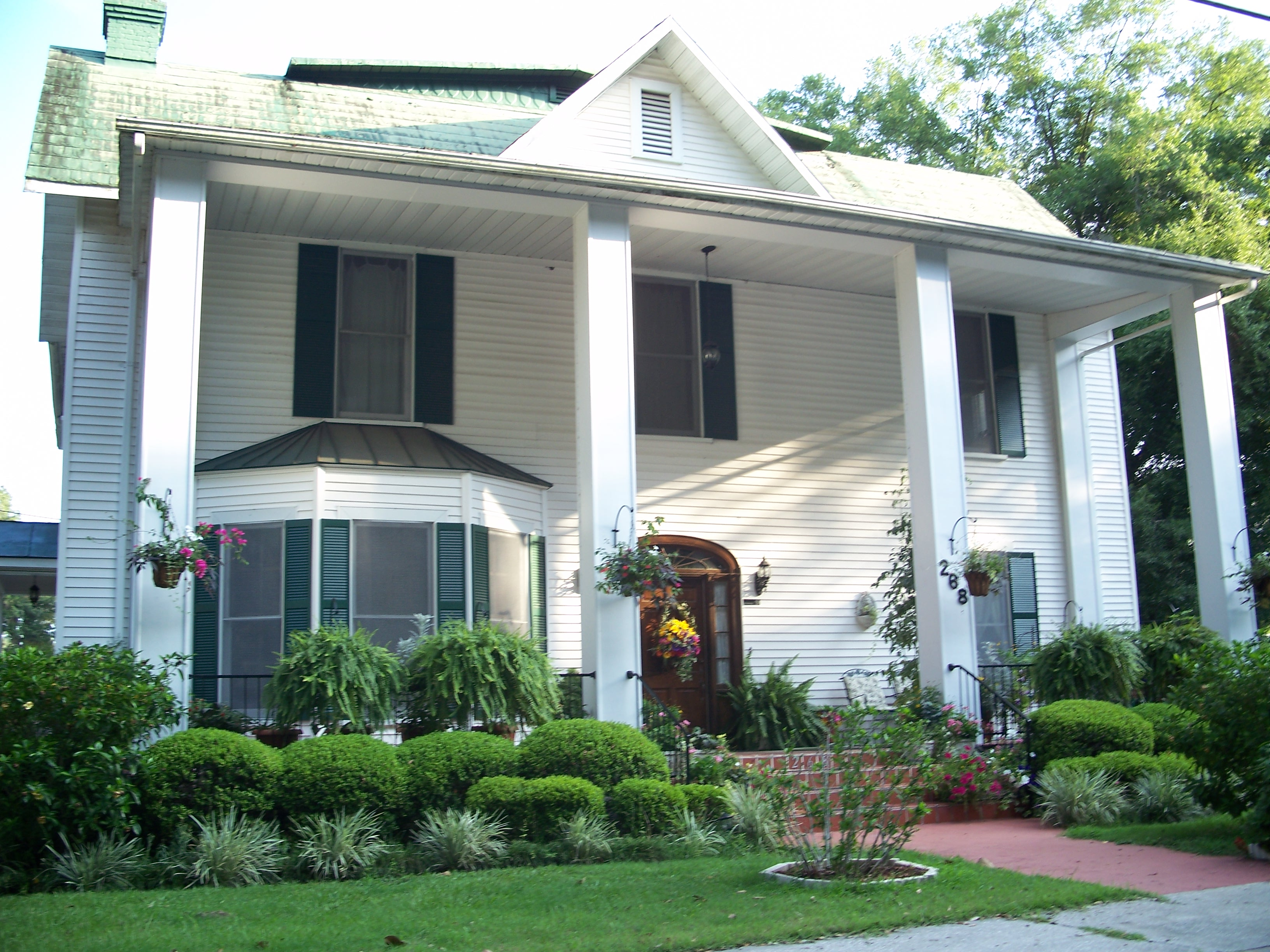
- Peterson Hall, a contributing element of the district, was originally built for William and Gertrude Peterson in 1906. The Peterson family occupied the home for nearly 100 years. Presently the home is owned by the Lydick family.

- Location within Florida Location within the United States
- Location: Lake City, Florida
- Coordinates: 30°11′9″N 82°38′4″W
- Area: 40 acres (160,000 m^{2})
- MPS: Lake City MPS
- NRHP reference No.: 93001156
- Added to NRHP: November 15, 1993

The Lake Isabella Historic Residential District is a U.S. historic district (designated as such on November 15, 1993) located in Lake City, Florida. The district is bounded by East, Duval and Columbia Streets, Baya Avenue, Church Street and Lake Isabella. It contains 145 historic buildings.
