= Isabella River (New South Wales) =

River in New South Wales, Australia

Coordinates: 34°00′S 149°39′E

Isabella

Location
- Country: Australia
- State: New South Wales
- IBRA: South Eastern Highlands
- District: Central West
- Municipality: Oberon

Physical characteristics
- Source: Great Dividing Range
  - location: between Isabella and Burraga
  - elevation: 1,150 m (3,770 ft)
- Mouth: Abercrombie River
  - location: east of Tuena
  - elevation: 479 m (1,572 ft)
- Length: 51 km (32 mi)

Basin features
- River system: Lachlan catchment, Murray–Darling basin

Isabella River, a perennial stream that is part of the Lachlan catchment within the Murray–Darling basin, is located in the central–western region of New South Wales, Australia.

The river rises on the western slopes of the Great Dividing Range, between Isabella and Burraga, and flows generally south, south-west, north-west and west, before reaching its confluence with the Abercrombie River east of Tuena; descending 671 metres (2,201 ft) over its 51-kilometre (32 mi) course.

== See also ==
- List of rivers of New South Wales (A–K)
- List of rivers of Australia
