= Lake Isabelle =

Lake in the state of Minnesota, United States

- Lake Isabelle, Lake Isabell
- Location within Minnesota
- Location: Dakota County, Minnesota
- Coordinates: 44°44.5′N 92°50.5′W
- Type: lake

Lake Isabel (also rendered Lake Isabelle and Lake Isabell) is a lake in Dakota County, in the U.S. state of Minnesota.

Lake Isabel was named for a daughter of the founder of Hastings.

== See also ==
- List of lakes in Minnesota
