= Isabella Lake (Alberta) =

- Location within Alberta
- Location: Alberta, Canada
- Coordinates: 51.7972222°N 116.4227778°W
- Type: Lake

Isabella Lake is a lake in Alberta, Canada.

Isabella Lake has the name of the sister of C. S. Thompson.

== See also ==
- List of lakes of Alberta
