= Izi =

Izi may refer to:

== People ==
- Izzi people, an ethnic group of Nigeria
- Izi (Ancient Egyptian official), Fourth Dynasty official
- Izi (overseer of the treasury), Sixth Dynasty royal court official
- Izi (nomarch) (fl. 2400 BC), ancient Egyptian governor
- Izi Castro Marques (born 1982), Brazilian basketball player
- Izi Dorot (1916–1980), Israeli military official
- Izi (rapper) (born 1995), Italian rapper and actor
- Igor Ivanov Izi (born 1973), Macedonian film director

== Places ==
- Izi, North Khorasan, Iran
- Izi, Razavi Khorasan, Iran

== Other uses ==
- Izi mobil (Bosnia and Herzegovina), a mobile communications brand
- Izi language, an Igbo language of Nigeria
- izi, ISO 939-3 language code of the Igboid languages

== See also ==
- Izzi (disambiguation)
- Easy (disambiguation)
- IZY, a train service between Brussels and Paris
