= ISI =

ISI or Isi may refer to:

== Organizations ==
- Intercollegiate Studies Institute, a classical conservative organization focusing on college students
- Ice Skating Institute, a trade association for ice rinks
- Indian Standards Institute, former name of the national standards body of India, the Bureau of Indian Standards
  - ISI mark, a product certification mark in India
- Institute for Scientific Information, part of Clarivate Analytics (formerly the Healthcare & Science business of the Thomson Reuters Corporation)
- Institute for Scientific Interchange, a theoretical scientific research centre based in Turin, Italy
- Inter-Services Intelligence, an intelligence agency of Pakistan
- International Statistical Institute, a professional association of statisticians
- International Systems Institute, a scientific and educational corporation founded by Béla H. Bánáthy
- Iron and Steel Institute, precedent organization to the Institute of Materials, Minerals and Mining
- Islamic State of Iraq, an umbrella organization of a number of Iraqi insurgency groups
- Integral Satcom Initiative, the European Technology Platform on Satellite Communications
- Independent Schools Inspectorate, responsible for the inspection of independent schools and private further education colleges in England
- Integrated Systems, Inc., a former developer of real-time operating systems
- Image Space Incorporated, an independent video game developer
- ImageSat International, an Israeli satellite imagery company

=== Schools and educational institutions ===
- Indian Statistical Institute, a public research institute and university in Baranagar, Kolkata, India
- Indonesian Institute of the Arts, a collective name of arts university in Indonesia:
  - Indonesian Institute of the Arts, Denpasar
  - Indonesian Institute of the Arts, Surakarta
  - Indonesian Institute of the Arts, Yogyakarta
- Information Sciences Institute, a research and development unit of the University of Southern California's Viterbi School of Engineering
- Institute of Scientific Instrumentation, a subsidiary of the Bangladesh University Grants Commission
- Intercollegiate Studies Institute, a non-profit educational organization
- International School Ibadan, a school located on the Campus of the University of Ibadan
- International School of Iceland, a school located in Garðabær, Iceland, a suburb of the capital city of Reykjavík
- Islamic School of Irving, in the Dallas-Fort Worth area

== Science and technology ==
- Information Sharing Index, former name of ContactPoint, a government database that held information on all children in England
- Infrared Spatial Interferometer, an astronomical interferometer array of three telescopes
- International Sensitivity Index, an index value used to standardize different thromboplastins for use in blood coagulation testing
- Interstimulus interval, the temporal interval between the offset of one stimulus to the onset of another
- Intersymbol interference, a form of distortion of a signal in which one symbol interferes with subsequent symbols
- Instruction Storage Interrupt, segmentation fault of a PowerPC

== Other uses ==
- Isi (name), personal name, sometimes an abbreviation of various other names
- "Isi" (song), 1975 track by Neu! from the album Neu! '75
- İsi, a village and municipality in Azerbaijan
- Import substitution industrialization, a trade and economic policy

== See also ==
- Isis (disambiguation)
- IS1 (disambiguation)
