= Izzy =

- Pronunciation: /ˈɪzi/ I-zee
- Gender: Unisex (but usually female)

Origin
- Meaning: Short for every name with the sound "Iz"

Izzy is a common nickname for the given names Israel, Isaac, Isidor, Isidore, Isadore, Isidora, Isabel, Isobel, Isabella, Isaiah, Issam, Isabelle, etc.

Izzy, Izzie, Issie, Issy, Isy or Izy may refer to:

== People ==
=== Izzy ===
- Israel Izzy Abraham (born 1980), American football coach
- Israel Adesanya (born 1989), Nigerian-born New Zealand mixed martial artist, kickboxer and boxer
- Israel Izzy Alcántara (born 1971), former baseball player from the Dominican Republic
- Israel Izzy Asper (1932–2003), Canadian tax lawyer and media magnate
- Isabelle Beisiegel (born 1979), Canadian golfer
- Isaiah Brown (born 1997), English footballer
- John Izzy Canillo (born 2004), Filipino child actor
- Isabel Izzy Daniel (born 2001), American ice hockey player
- Isidor/Isadore Izzy Einstein (c. 1880–1938), American federal police officer during the early Prohibition era
- Isidore Izzy Goldstein (1909–1993), Major League Baseball pitcher
- Isadore Izzy Gomez (restaurateur) (1875 or 1876–1944), Portuguese-born San Francisco restaurateur
- Isadore Elliot Handler (1916–2011), American inventor, business magnate, co-founder of Mattel and co-inventor, with his wife Ruth, of Barbie, Chatty Cathy and Hot Wheels
- Ezomo Izzy Iriekpen (born 1982), English former footballer
- Jason Isringhausen (born 1972), American former Major League Baseball pitcher and coach
- Israel Izzy Katzman (1917–2007), American sportswriter
- Israel Izzy Lang (born 1942), American former National Football League running back
- Isidoro Izzy León (1911–2002), Major League Baseball pitcher from Cuba
- Israel George Levene (1885–1930), American collegiate football player and head coach
- Israel Izzy Martinez (born 1982), American wrestling coach
- Isadore Schwartz (1900–1988), American boxer, world flyweight champion from 1927 to 1929
- Isadore Sparber (1906–1958), American storyboard artist, writer, director and producer of animated films
- Isidor I. F. Stone (1907–1989), American investigative journalist, also the "Izzy Awards," a journalism prize named for him bestowed by Roy H. Park School of Communications at Ithaca College
- Isabelle Izzy Westbury (born 1990), English cricketer
- Julius Izzy Yablok (1907–1983), American football player
- Israel Izzy Young (1928-2019), American folk music store owner

=== Issie, Issy or Isy ===
- Isabella Blow (1958–2007), English magazine editor
- Isadore Coop (1926–2003), Canadian architect
- Isadore Sharp (born 1931), Canadian hotelier and writer, founder and chairman of Four Seasons Hotels and Resorts
- Isobel Isy Suttie (born 1978), English musical comedian, actress and writer

=== Stage name ===
- Izzy Bizu, singer songwriter Isobel Beardshaw (born 1994)
- Issy Bonn, British Jewish actor, singer and comedian born Benjamin Levin (1903–1977)
- Isobel Cooper (born 1975), English operatic pop soprano known professionally as Izzy
- Izzy Stradlin, former Guns N' Roses guitarist and co-founder Jeffrey Dean Isbell (born 1962)
- Izzy (singer), Brazilian singer and songwriter (born 1990)

== Fictional characters ==
- Izzy Armstrong, on the British soap opera Coronation Street
- Izzy Daniels, the main character in the Disney Channel television film Jump In!, portrayed by Corbin Bleu
- Izzy Davies, on the British soap opera Hollyoaks
- Izzy Edwards, a 7-year old pirate girl from the 2011-2016 Disney Junior TV series Jake and the Never Land Pirates.
- Isabella "Izzy" Garcia, one the main characters in Power Rangers Dino Fury and Power Rangers Cosmic Fury
- Izzy Gomez, in the television series TUGS
- Izzy Hands, a character in the HBO show "Our Flag Means Death" based on the historical pirate Israel Hands
- Izzy Hawthorne, one of the main characters from the 2022 3D-animated film Lightyear
- Isabelle Hoyland, on the Australian soap opera Neighbours
- Isabelle "Izzy" Huffstodt, on the American television series Huff
- Izzy Izumi, in the Digimon series
- Izzy Mandelbaum, recurring character on the American television series Seinfeld, portrayed by Lloyd Bridges
- Izzy Moonbow, a lilac purple female unicorn from the 2021 film My Little Pony: A New Generation and later appears in the Netflix TV show My Little Pony: Make Your Mark.
- Izzy Moreno, the informant for Sonny and Rico in the American television series Miami Vice, portrayed by Martin Ferrero
- Ismael Ortega, a Marvel Comics character
- Isabel "Izzy" Reubens, in Love and Rockets
- Isabelle "Izzy" Silva, one of the main characters on the TV show You Me Her
- Izzy Sinclair, in the Doctor Who comic strip
- Izzy Sparks, a video game character
- Izzy the Guinea Pig, a punky leader character in Wonder Pets: In The City
- Izzie Stevens, in the series Grey's Anatomy
- Izzie, from SciGirls
- Izzy, one of the titular characters of Ben & Izzy, a Jordanian animated television series
- Izzy, from the Canadian animated television series Total Drama
- Irreverent Izzy, a non-playable character mentioned in the PlayStation 4 exclusive video game, "Bloodborne"
- Izzy Bohen, a character from Jeepers Creepers 2
- Izzy Buttons, a character in the 2001 film The Mummy Returns
- Izzy, a character in the 2022 film Hocus Pocus 2

== Legendary creatures ==
- Issie, a Japanese lake monster

== Mascots ==
- Izzy (mascot), the 1996 Summer Olympics mascot
- Izzy the Islander, mascot of Texas A&M University–Corpus Christi

== See also ==
- Isi (name)
- Izzi (disambiguation)
