= Izzy Gomez =

Izzy Gomez may refer to:

- Izzy Gomez (restaurateur), Portuguese-American restaurateur from San Francisco, California
- Izzy Gomez, fictional character from the British children's TV series TUGS
