= Eazy =

Eazy may refer to:

- "Eazy" (song), by Kanye West and the Game, 2022
- "Eazy", a song by G-Eazy from The Beautiful & Damned, 2017
- "Eazy", a song by Nasty C, 2020
- Eazy-E (1964–1995), American rapper
- G-Eazy (born 1989), American rapper

== See also ==
- Easy (disambiguation)
- EZ (disambiguation)
