= Izze =

Izze may refer to:

- Izze-kloth, a sacred cord worn by Apache medicine men
- Izze (drink), a sparkling juice brand

== See also ==
- Izzi (disambiguation)
- Izzy, a nickname
