= Easy =

Easy is an adjective describing something that is not difficult to do. It may also refer to:

== Arts and entertainment ==
=== Film and television ===
- Easy (2003 film), an American romantic comedy film
- Easy (2017 film), a comedy-drama film
- Easy!, or Scialla!, a 2011 Italian comedy film
- Easy (TV series), a 2016–2019 American comedy-drama anthology series

=== Music ===
==== Albums ====
- Easy (Easybeats album), 1965
- Easy (Grant Green album), 1978
- Easy (Grinspoon album), 1999
- Easy (Kelly Willis album) or the title song, 2002
- Easy (Marvin Gaye and Tammi Terrell album), 1969
- Easy (Nancy Wilson album), 1968
- Easy (Ralph McTell album), 1974
- Easy, by Cowboy Mouth, 2000

==== EPs ====
- Easy (EP), by Le Sserafim, 2024

==== Songs ====
- "Easy" (Commodores song), 1977; covered by Faith No More, 1992
- "Easy" (Camila Cabello song), 2019
- "Easy" (Cro song), 2012
- "Easy" (DaniLeigh song), 2019
- "Easy" (Dragonette song), 2010
- "Easy" (Ice MC song), 1989
- "Easy" (Jvke song), 2025
- "Easy" (KSI, Bugzy Malone and R3hab song), 2023
- "Easy" (Le Sserafim song), 2024
- "Easy" (Mat Zo and Porter Robinson song), 2013
- "Easy" (Pale Waves song), 2021
- "Easy" (Paula DeAnda song), 2007
- "Easy" (Rascal Flatts song), featuring Natasha Bedingfield, 2011
- “Easy” (Sheryl Crow song), 2013
- "Easy" (Sugababes song), 2006
- "Easy" (Troye Sivan song), 2020
- "Easy" (Hazbin Hotel song), 2025
- "Easy", by Barenaked Ladies from Barenaked Ladies Are Me, 2006
- "Easy", by Bonnie McKee from Bombastic, 2015
- "Easy", by Busted from Night Driver, 2016
- “Easy”, by Curved Air from Air Cut, 1973
- "Easy", by the Dandy Warhols from Odditorium or Warlords of Mars, 2005
- "Easy", by Deer Tick from Born on Flag Day, 2009
- "Easy", by Demi Lovato from Dancing with the Devil... the Art of Starting Over, 2021
- "Easy", by Ella Mai from Ella Mai, 2018
- "Easy", by Emilíana Torrini from Love in the Time of Science, in 1999
- "Easy", by Groove Armada from Lovebox, 2002
- "Easy", by Imagine Dragons from the release of Hell and Silence EP, 2021
- "Easy", by Jess Glynne from the album Jess, 2024
- "Easy", by Joanna Newsom from Have One on Me, 2010
- "Easy", by John Newman from Tribute, 2013
- "Easy", by Matthew Sweet from Earth, 1989
- "Easy", by Nicki Minaj, Gucci Mane and Rocko from Beam Me Up Scotty, 2009
- "Easy", by Nik Kershaw from The Riddle, 1984
- "Easy", by No Doubt from Push and Shove, 2012
- "Easy", by Rich the Kid from Boss Man, 2020
- "Easy", by Son Lux from Lanterns, 2013
- "Easy", by Stray Kids from Go Live, 2020
- "Easy", by Terrorvision from Regular Urban Survivors, 1996
- "Easy", by Tokio Hotel from Dream Machine, 2017
- "Easy", by Tycho from Weather, 2019
- "Easy", by Violent Soho from Everything Is A-OK, 2020
- "Easy Easy", by the Scotland national football team, 1974
- "Easy Easy", by King Krule from 6 Feet Beneath the Moon, 2013
- "Easy", by Nick Carter and Jimmie Allen, 2022

==== Bands ====
- Easy (band), a pop band from Finland

=== Radio and television stations ===
- Easy FM, in Beijing, China
- Easy FM (Kenya)
- Easy FM (New Zealand)
- Easy Rock, a Philippine radio network owned by MBC Media Group
  - 96.3 Easy Rock, its flagship station
- Easy TV, in Ireland
- Easy TV (Philippines), a former ISDB-T digital television receiver box in the Philippines

== Businesses and organisations ==
- easyGroup, the holding company controlling the "easy" family of brands
  - easyJet, a British multinational low-cost airline group
- Easy (store), a South American chain of home centers
- Easy Card, a series of linked contactless smartcard systems in Florida, U.S.

== Other uses ==
- EASY programme, an application procedure for seeking asylum in Germany
- Enhanced avionics system (EASy), an avionics suite used on Dassault Falcon business jets
- Operation Easy, a 1948 Indian military operation during the Indo-Pakistani war of 1947–1948
- Easy Anti-Cheat, a video game software

== See also ==
- Ease (disambiguation)
- EASSy (Eastern Africa Submarine Cable System), a submarine fibre optic cable system
- Easy Come Easy Go (disambiguation)
- Easy for You to Say (disambiguation)
- Eazy (disambiguation)
- EZ (disambiguation)
- Hurricane Easy (disambiguation)
- Izi (disambiguation)
- Simple (disambiguation)
- Take It Easy (disambiguation)
- The Big Easy (disambiguation)
- "Eez-eh", a song by Kasabian
