= Rated R&B =

Online music magazine

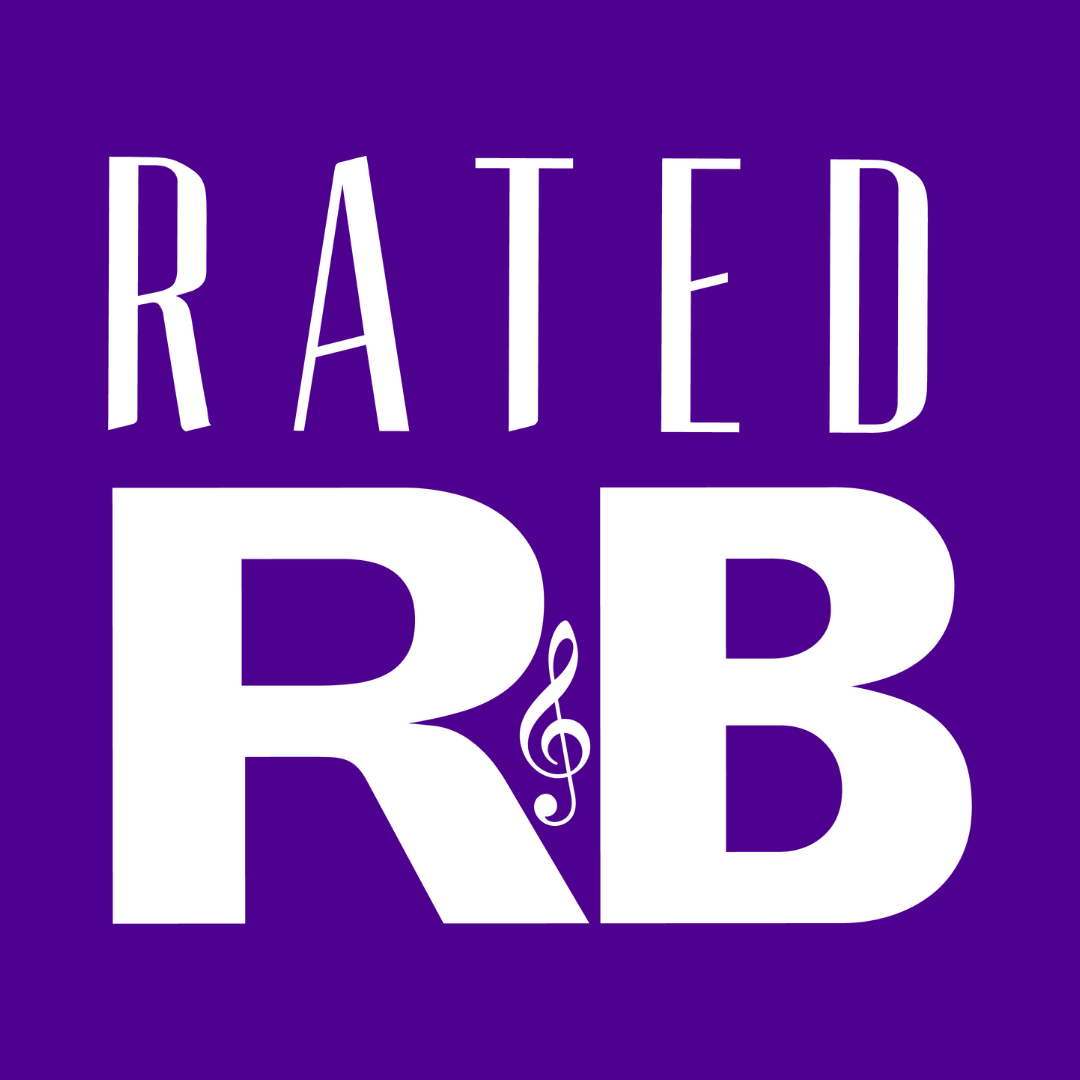
- Website type: Online magazine
- Available in: English
- Owners: Rated R&B, LLC
- Editor: Keithan Samuels
- Website: www.ratedrnb.com
- Launched: 2011; 15 years ago
- Current status: Active

Rated R&B is an independent online magazine based in the United States, which is dedicated and devoted to news, topics and almost all things related to rhythm and blues (R&B) and soul music. It publishes independent music reviews, features, interview, and media. Founded and currently edited by Keithan Samuels in August 2011, the webzine has become a leading online source for R&B and soul music news according to Samuels himself and also openly promotes underrated/unnoticed artists of that genre.

Reviews by Rated R&B have been mentioned in publications such as BBC,VIBE, Dazed, Essence, Forbes, The Huffington Post, Yahoo! and Vogue. Rated R&B also publishes music premieres, exclusive live performances and playlists.

== History ==
During an interview with Shannon Ramsey, the host of Incisive Entertainment's Let's Talk web series, Samuels, who first began writing articles about music in 2009, revealed the backstory and inspiration behind him launching the webzine, saying:

Before I got to Rated R&B, I was doing some entertainment writing on [an]other blog that I had for a couple years and... it was okay but [um] I felt like at a certain point I just started losing passion for it. Just... whatever I was writing about wasn't really sticking to me so I took a break and during that break I had a time to just relax and observe a lot and one thing that I observed is there were a lot of R&B artists who were putting out music and it wasn't being heard and when they were getting the media placements it wasn't [um] always positive, it was a lot of negativity and gossip so... I think that's what kind of drove me into creating Rated R&B, having a positive platform that R&B artists can lead to on a day-to day basis.

In 2020, eZ Toolset listed Rated R&B at number two on their 15 Top R&B Music RSS Feeds To Follow list and Feedspost also listed the webzine at number four on their Top 40 R&B Music Blogs list.

== Rated R&B Music Awards ==
The Rated R&B Music Awards was an online awards program associated with Rated R&B that recognized achievements in rhythm and blues music. Its inaugural ceremony was held on December 18, 2013. On December 27, 2015, the second ceremony was held, with the awards program now known as the Best of R&B Awards. The third ceremony was held on December 29, 2016.
