= IMinds =

Flemish research non-profit

iMinds (formerly IBBT) was a Flemish non-profit organization, founded by the Flemish Government. It was founded as a research institute, with a focus on information & communication technology (ICT) in general, and applications of broadband technology in particular. iMinds offers companies and organizations active support in research and development. It brings together companies, authorities, and non-profit organizations to join forces on research projects.

In September 2016, iMinds merged with international research and development center IMEC.

== Organization ==
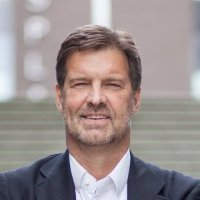
Wim de Waele

The central staff of iMinds consists of 29 full-time employees. They are responsible for operational support and external communication. Wim De Waele is Director of iMinds.

iMinds has an extended network of partners. Some of these partners are actively involved in determining the long-term vision and strategy of iMinds.

iMinds unites more than 1000 researchers from 5 research departments specialized in one or more of the basic competencies of iMinds. The composition of the research groups is flexible and aligned to the evolving needs of companies and organizations.

The Board of Directors is made up of representatives from both the private and public sector. The 16 members ensure that all research programs meet existing needs.

== European Alliance for Innovation ==
iMinds is a member of the European Alliance For Innovation (EAI) since May 2011. EAI is a grassroots organization initiated through cooperation between public, private and government organisations. EAI bridges the gaps between the market, research, and regulation, bringing together key players from every discipline within the ICT innovation cycle.

== Research domains ==
iMinds stimulates research that addresses current social and economic issues.

- Culture & Media
- Healthy Society
- ICT and Energy
- Sustainable Mobility
- Social & Secure ICT

iMinds has carried out over 250 research projects within these themes already.

== See also ==
- Agoria
- Communications in Belgium
- Performance Analysis of Telecommunication Systems
- Flemish institute for technological research (VITO)
- Networked and Electronic Media (NEM)
- Integral Satcom Initiative (EU)
- Science and technology in Flanders
