= IS1 =

IS1, IS-1, or variation, may refer to:

== IS1 ==
IS1 may refer to:

- HMG Infosec Standard No.1, a computer security standard used in the UK
- The IBM IS1, an early relational database system

== IS-1 ==
IS-1 may stand for:

- The Soviet tank IS-1 the first model of the Soviet Iosif Stalin tank series
- The first model of the Soviet Istrebitel Sputnikov missile; see anti-satellite weapon
- Nikitin IS-1, a retractable wing fighter aircraft

== See also ==
- ISI (disambiguation)
- IS (disambiguation)
