= Amenazzy =

Dominican singer

- Also known as: El Nene La Amenaza
- Born: José Daniel Betances; August 4, 1995 (age 31); San Isidro, Santo Domingo
- Genre: Urban music
- Occupation: Singer
- Label: Rimas

José Daniel Betances, known professionally as Amenazzy, or sometimes El Nene La Amenaza, is a Dominican urban music singer from Santiago de los Caballeros.

== Biography ==
Amenazzy was born in Santiago, Dominican Republic in 1995, and began singing at an early age. He was featured on a 2013 single by Los Mellos on the Track. After several more guest appearances, he had a solo hit single in 2015 with "La Chanty", and his self-titled album was released in 2016.

Amanazzy has been praised for his combination of reggaeton and R&B music. He has collaborated with artists such as El Alfa, Bryant Myers, G-Eazy, Farruko, Don Omar, De La Ghetto, Izzy La Reina, Myke Towers, Yandel and Nicky Jam. His song "Baby" with Nicky Jam and Farruko generated over 300 million views on YouTube.
