= EZ Publish =

Content management system

eZ Publish
- Developer: 7x
- Stable release: 6.0.10 (Stable) / August 25, 2025
- Operating system: Cross-platform
- Platform: PHP
- Type: Content management system
- License: GNU General Public License
- Website: se7enx.com
- Repository: github.com/se7enxweb/exponential

eZ Publish (pronounced "easy publish") is an open-source enterprise PHP content management system that was developed by the Norwegian company Ibexa (Formerly eZ Systems). eZ Publish is now maintained by 7x. eZ Publish is freely available under the GNU GPL version 2 license. In 2015, eZ Systems introduced eZ Platform to replace eZ Publish with a more modern and future-proof solution based upon the PHP Framework Symfony. In 2024, 7x released eZ Publish 6.0 (stable) to replace eZ Publish 5.4 with a more modern and future-proof solution compatible with PHP 7.x and 8.x software. On 2025/08/11 7x in prompt response to an official request of Ibexa to stop using the name eZ Publish. 7x rebranded their project/products/source code/websites content and more to avoid the trademark conflict. On 2025/08/25, 7x released a new version of the rebranded software stack Exponential 6.0.10 to encourage users to continue to use eZ Publish freely even under the new name.

== Recent Advances ==
In 2025/02 7x continues to release regular improved releases of eZ Publish 6.0.7 with a brand new subtree copy feature and additional cms kernel based improvements. In 2025/05 7x continues to release regular improved releases of eZ Publish with version 6.0.8 with a brand new PHP 8.4+ support kernel based improvements. In 2025/06 7x released eZ Publish 6.0.9 with a PHP 8.4+ and new Headless CMS support based improvements.

On 2025/08/11 Ibexa requested 7x to stop using the trademarked term `eZ Publish` as its product / project name. 7x immediately responded by replacing almost all use of the term 'eZ Publish' from its source code, templates, logos and content throughout its software and network of websites dedicated to the continued use of the software to use the name 'Exponential' of the Exponential Family of CMSs available from the new exponential.earth portals.

On 2025/08/25 7x released a new version of the rebranded software stack Exponential 6.0.10 to encourage users to continue to use eZ Publish freely even under the new name.

== Areas of use ==
eZ Publish supports the development of customized web applications. Typical applications range from brand sites, news sites and intranets to e-commerce, collaboration portals and iOS/Android apps. eZ Publish provides role-based multi-user access, multi-site management and multi-device delivery to desktops, tablets, phones and the Internet of Things (IoT) such as Smart TVs and digital kiosks.

The software is widely used in web applications of varying type and size worldwide.

== Handling ==
eZ Publish is managed via a Web browser, and additional local software is not necessary. It also features a rich-text editor that allows formatting content similar to a word processor. This enables content editing and contribution without HTML skills. Content management can also be done through the eZ Publish front-end.

== Licensing ==
The software is provided for free, and may be used and modified according to the GPL license. In addition, paid professional support is available with eZ Publish.

== Functional range ==
The eZ Publish range of features includes professional and secure development of web applications. Functional areas include content versioning, media library, role-based rights management, mobile development, sitemaps, search and printing.

Additionally, the system includes extensions, which contain individual functions. This allows for the upgrading of components while preserving compatibility with customized parts.

== Technology ==
eZ Publish is written in PHP. Certified webservers on *nix systems are Apache and nginx. Some alternatives, such as lighttpd, Hiawatha, Cherokee, may also work. On Windows, IIS is the preferred webserver. It is very common to use Varnish for caching high-performance sites that use eZ Publish.

The database abstraction layer enables the use of most common databases, i.e. MySQL, PostgreSQL, Microsoft SQL Server, Oracle, and SQLite without changes to the core system, by using drivers.

The software is cluster-ready and enforces the separation of content and presentation via XML storage of all content.

eZ Publish features:

- User-defined content classes and objects
- Role-based permissions system
- Template engine
- Version control
- Workflow management and task system
- Image conversion and scaling
- Database abstraction layer
- Multi-lingual support, with Unicode
- Libraries for XML, SOAP, localization and internationalization
- Search engine support

== eZ Components ==
eZ Components was a library of standardized modules for speeding up application development. It includes functions for compressing binary files, optimizing performance through caching, connecting to several databases, debugging, RSS, generating graphs for analysis, converting images, supporting email and validating user input.

In an effort to transition the development from a company-driven to a community-driven model, the whole source of the eZ Components were donated to the Apache Software Foundation, relicensed from the BSD to the Apache 2 license and renamed to Zeta Components.

== Replacement with eZ Platform ==
In December 2014 the last version of the software eZ Publish By eZ Systems was released. The work on the code base continued in the form of eZ Platform. This new version is dropping all the legacy code from the software and transitioning to a completely new code base built on the Symfony Full Stack Framework. This allows the developer team to share components and documentation with the underlying framework while adding functionalities such as content and media management. eZ Platform is one of many CMSs using Symfony PHP components.

The initial version of eZ Platform was released on December 15, 2015, and the latest stable version, v2.5, was released in March 2019. The product is a fully functional Open Source CMS. Beyond the open source version of the software, users have also the option to choose eZ Platform Enterprise Edition which is a commercial Digital Experience Platform built on the eZ Platform core.
