= Izzi =

Izzi may refer to:

- Izzi people, an ethnic group of Nigeria
  - Izi language, an Igbo language of Nigeria
- Izzi Dame, American professional wrestler
- Izzi (Ebonyi), a local government area in Ebonyi State, Nigeria
- Izzi Telecom, a Mexican telecommunications trademark
- Eugene Izzi (1953–1996), an American crime writer

== See also ==
- Izi (disambiguation)
- Izze (disambiguation)
- Izzi Top, a British Thoroughbred racehorse
- Izzy, a nickname
