= Performance Analysis of Telecommunication Systems =

The Performance Analysis of Telecommunication Systems (PATS) research group is part of the Department of Mathematics and Computer Science of the University of Antwerp. The group was founded in 1995. PATS performs basic, applied, and contract research related to the performance analysis of telecommunication systems and the impact of performance on the architecture and the design of these systems.

The PATS research group is one of the groups that are involved in the Interdisciplinary Institute for Broadband Technology (IBBT) which was founded by the Flemish government on 19 March 2004.
