= The Big Easy (disambiguation) =

The Big Easy is a nickname for the city of New Orleans, Louisiana, United States.

The Big Easy may also refer to:

- The Big Easy (film), a 1986 film, set and shot in New Orleans
- The Big Easy (TV series), 1996, based on the film
- Ernie Els (born 1969), a South African professional golfer known as "The Big Easy"
  - Big Easy Tour, a Southern Africa golf tour named after the golfer
- Nathaniel "Big Easy" Lofton (born 1981), an American basketball player

== See also ==
- Easy (disambiguation)
