= EZ =

EZ or Ez may refer to:

== Arts, entertainment and media ==
- E-Z Rollers, a British drum and bass group
- EZ Rock, a brand of radio stations in Canada
- Ezekiel "EZ" Reyes, a fictional character in Mayans M.C.
- E.Z. Taylor, a fictional character in Three's a Crowd
- "E.Z.", a 2017 song by Blackbear from Cybersex
- "Ez-Ez", a song by Shashwat Sachdev, Raj Ranjodh, Diljit Dosanjh and Hanumankind from the 2025 Indian film Dhurandhar

== People ==
- DJ EZ, a British DJ
- E. Z. Money (Jason Broyles, born 1973), American professional wrestler

== Transportation ==
- E-ZPass, an American electronic toll collection system
- EZ TAG, an American electronic toll collection system in Houston, Texas
- Sun-Air of Scandinavia, IATA airline code EZ
- Evergreen International Airlines, IATA airline code formerly EZ

== Other uses ==
- EZ Communications, former American corporation
- EZ Industries, former Australian company
- E–Z notation, in chemistry
- eZ Platform, open-source software system
- E-Z Sort card, an edge-notched card
- Eurozone or Euro Area, a monetary union in Europe

== See also ==
- Easy (disambiguation)
- EZ Aquarii, a triple star system
- EZ Canis Majoris, a binary star
- EZ-DOS, an OEM version of DR DOS
- EZ Word, an early word processor
- EZcode, a barcode system
- Ezhou, a city in Hubei, China
