= The Time of Your Life =

1939 play by William Saroyan

- First edition 1939
- Original language: English
- Written by: William Saroyan
- Genre: Drama
- Setting: San Francisco bar, October 1939

Premiere
- Date: October 25, 1939
- Place: Booth Theatre; New York City, New York, United States

The Time of Your Life is a 1939 five-act play by American playwright William Saroyan. The play is the first drama to win both the Pulitzer Prize for Drama and the New York Drama Critics Circle Award. The play opened on Broadway in 1939.

== Characters ==
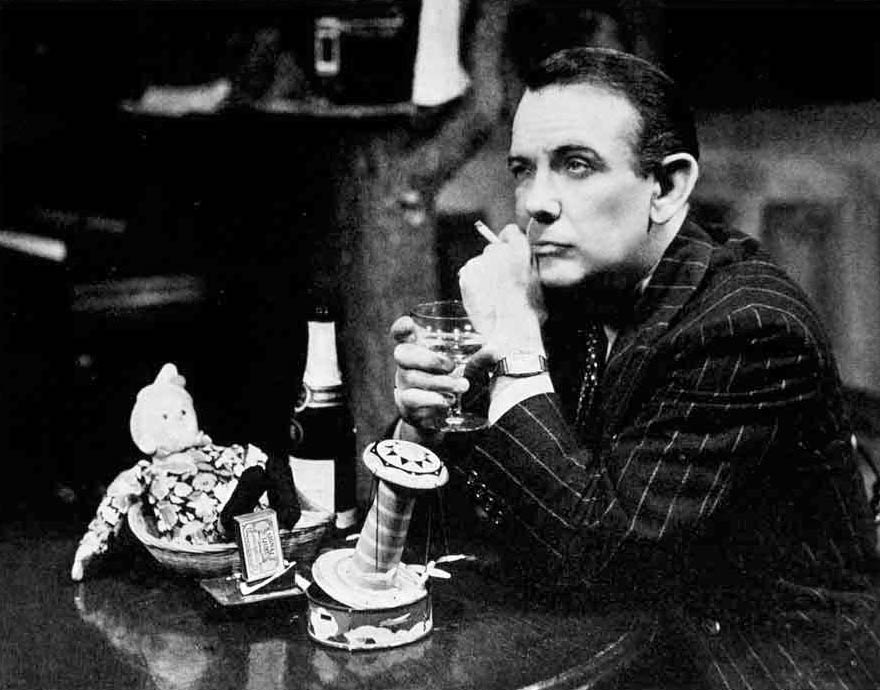
Eddie Dowling as Joe in the original Broadway production of The Time of Your Life (1939), which he also directed

Main characters

- Joe, a loafer with money and a good heart
- Tom, his admirer, disciple, errand boy, stooge and friend
- Kitty Duval, a young streetwalker who longs for a better life
- Nick, owner of Nick's Pacific Street Saloon, Restaurant and Entertainment Palace
- Arab, an Eastern philosopher and harmonica-player
- Kit Carson, a teller of tall tales who looks like an old Indian-fighter
- McCarthy, an intelligent and well-read longshoreman
- Krupp, his boyhood friend, a waterfront cop who hates his job but doesn't know what else to do instead
- Harry, a natural born hoofer who wants to make people laugh but can't
- Wesley, a young Black man who plays a mean and melancholy boogie-woogie piano
- Willie, a marble-game maniac
- Dudley, a young man in love
- Elsie, a nurse, the one he loves
- Lorene, an unattractive woman
- Mary L., an unhappy woman of quality and great beauty
- Blick, a heel

Minor characters

- A Newsboy
- A Drunkard
- Nick's Ma
- Sailor
- Killer, a streetwalker
- Killer's sidekick
- Society Gentleman
- Society Lady
- Cops

== Plot ==
The play is set in Nick's Pacific Street Saloon, Restaurant and Entertainment Palace, a run-down dive bar in San Francisco. Much of the action of the play centers around Joe, a young loafer with money who encourages each of the bar's patrons in their eccentricities. Joe helps out a would-be dancer, Harry, and sets up his flunky, Tom, with a prostitute, Kitty Duval. The bar is frequented by a number of colorful characters, including a frenetic young man in love, an old man who looks like Kit Carson, and a wealthy society couple.

Nick's saloon is based on the café operated by Izzy Gomez in San Francisco, which Saroyan frequented.

== Productions ==
The play was produced by the Theatre Guild. It premiered on Broadway at the Booth Theatre on October 25, 1939, closed on January 27, 1940, and re-opened at the Guild Theatre on January 29, 1940 to April 6, 1940 and September 23, 1940 to October 19, 1940, for 249 performances. Direction was by Eddie Dowling, who also starred as Joe, and William Saroyan. The cast featured Julie Haydon (Kitty Duval), Celeste Holm (Mary L.), Charles De Sheim (Nick), and Gene Kelly (Harry).

The Time of Your Life has been revived three times on Broadway: in 1940 with Dowling and Saroyan directing again, in 1969 directed by John Hirsch and in 1975 directed by Jack O'Brien.

The play was revived on March 17, 1972 at the Huntington Hartford Theater in Los Angeles where Henry Fonda, Richard Dreyfuss, Ron Thompson, Gloria Grahame, Strother Martin. Jane Alexander, Richard X. Slattery and Pepper Martin were among the cast with Edwin Sherin directing.

== Adaptations ==
The play was adapted for film in 1948 with H. C. Potter directing James Cagney as Joe and his sister, Jeanne Cagney as Kitty Duval. In 1958 an adaptation by A.J. Russell was presented in a live television broadcast directed by Tom Donovan with stars Jackie Gleason, Jack Klugman, and Dick York for the Playhouse 90 series.

== Awards and nominations ==
Awards

- 1940 New York Drama Critics' Circle Award for Best American Play
- 1940 Pulitzer Prize for Drama
