= Tomb of the Charuns =

Etruscan tomb in Tarquinia, Italy

Coordinates: 42°15′0.16″N 11°46′11.5″E

- Tomba dei Caronti
- Tomb of the Charons
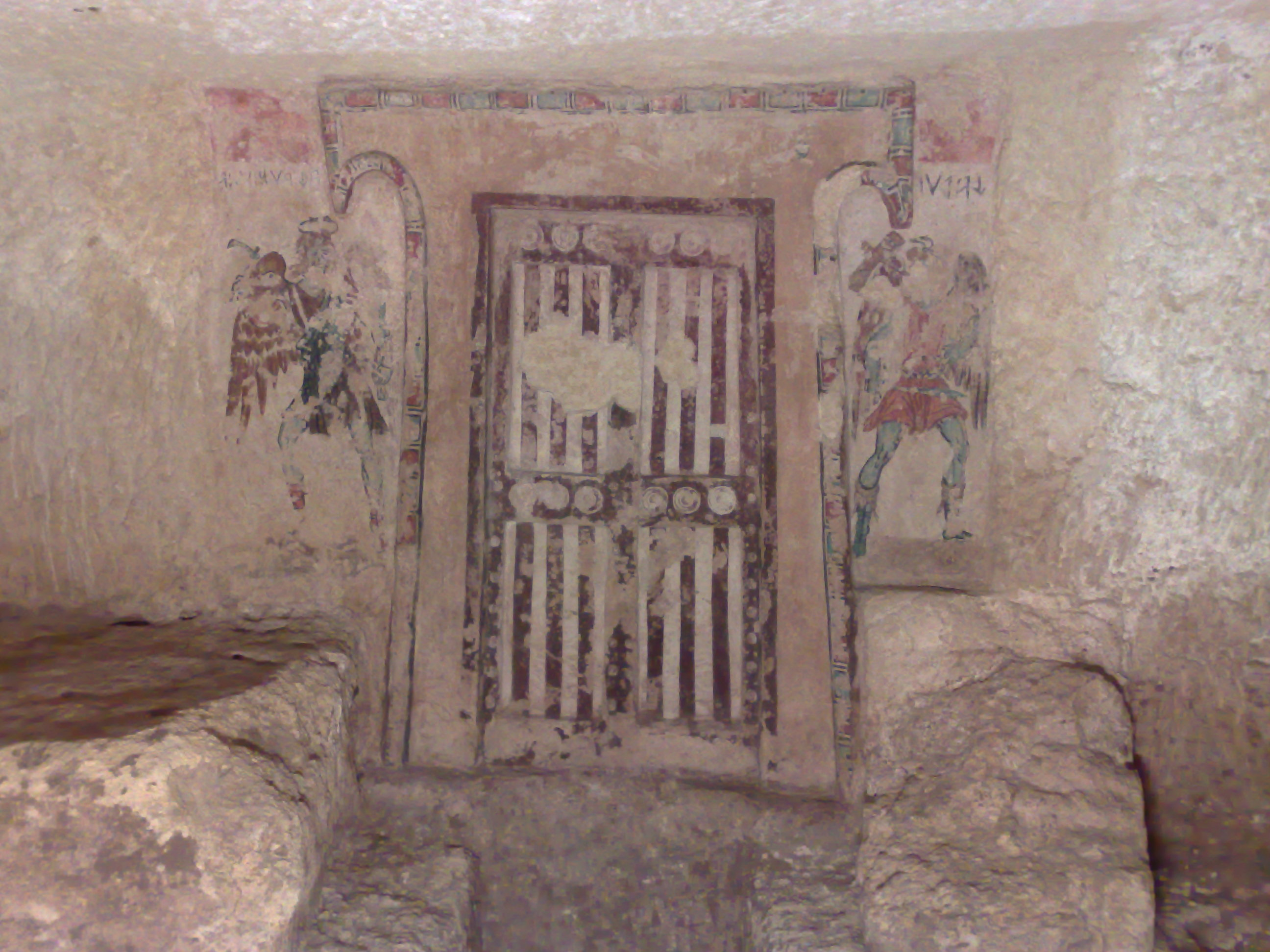
- The fresco of the Tomb of the Charuns
- Interactive map of Tomb of the Charuns
- Cultures: Etruscan
- Location: Monterozzi necropolis, Tarquinia, Lazio, Italy

Site notes
- Discovered: 1960
- Management: Superintendency for the Archaeological Heritage of Southern Etruria

The Tomb of the Charuns, also known as the Tomb of the Charons, (Italian: Tomba dei Caronti) is an Etruscan tomb, located in the Monterozzi necropolis of Tarquinia, which dates to 250–275 BC.

== Description ==
In the tomb, two stairways lead to two different burial chambers. Two large, closed doors are depicted, symbolising the passage to the afterlife. Flanking the respective doors are two Charuns, depicted in fresco. The two Charuns, demons who guard the entrance to the underworld, are depicted with blue skin, winged, holding a hammer, with horns and thick hair.

Four Charuns shown in frescos, and each appears to have sub-names. These are Charun Chunchules, the heavily blistered Charun Huths, Charun Lufe, and the fourth has crumbled away to illegibility.

The tomb is accessed via a curved dromos or passageway. In the burial chamber two raised levels can be seen, where the bodies of the deceased were laid to rest in ancient times. A stone block is placed between these two raised levels. Before the stairs, on the left of the vestibule, are benches for visitors to rest.

== See also ==
- Monterozzi necropolis

== Gallery ==
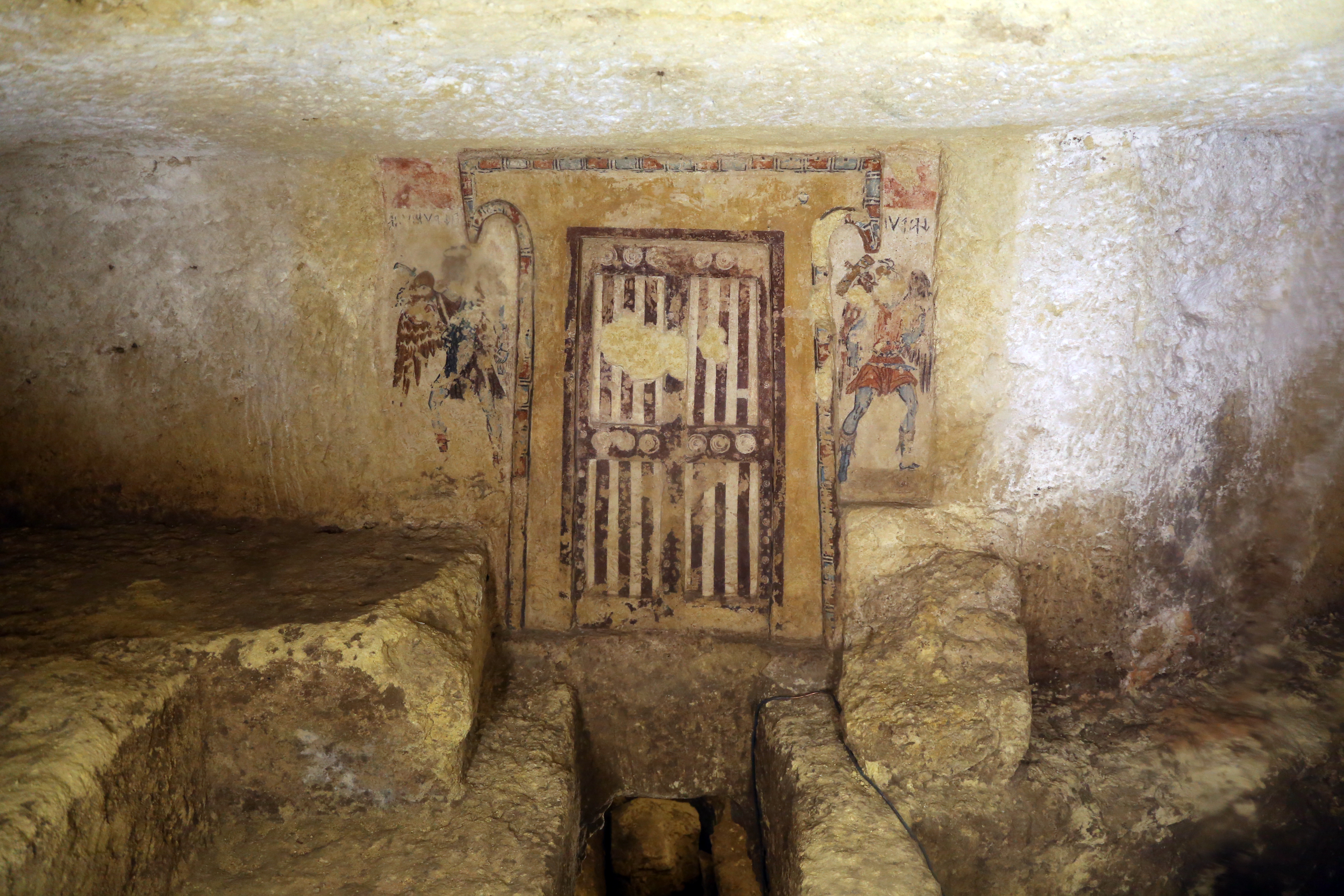
False door in the Tomb of the Charuns

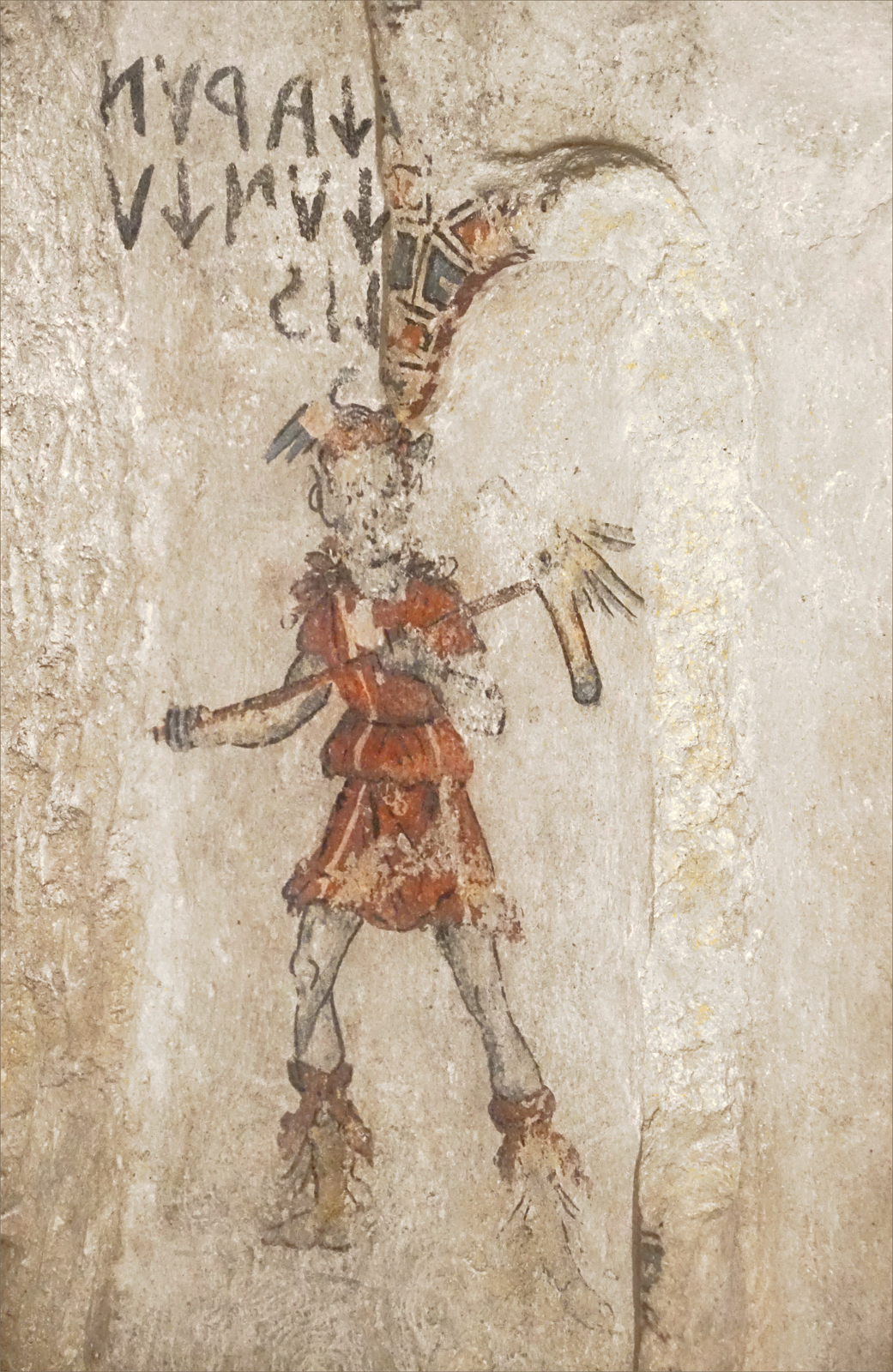
Figure of Charun
