= Ease =

Ease or EASE may refer to:

== Computing ==
- Ease (programming language)
- Enhanced Acoustic Simulator for Engineers, software for optimizing acoustics
- EASE, a satellite-monitoring software suite developed by Telespazio Germany

== Health and medicine ==
- Methylone, marketed briefly in New Zealand as Ease
- Examination of Anomalous Self-Experience, to detect self-disorder

== Other uses ==
- Ease (sewing), the amount of room a garment allows the wearer beyond the measurements of their body
- Ease, a 1985 novel by Patrick Gale
- EASE/ACCESS, a pair of 1985 space shuttle flight experiments
- European Association of Science Editors, a non-profit membership organisation

== See also ==
- Easy (disambiguation)
- At Ease
- Usability
- Ease-in and ease-out, methods of inbetweening in animation
