= Isi (name) =

Isi is a personal name; sometimes an abbreviation of Isidore, Isaac, Israel, Isabel, or Islam, or the equivalents in another language.

- Isi (footballer, born October 1995), Isaac Gómez Sánchez, a Spanish football midfielder
- Isi Gabsa (born 1995), Isabell Gabsa, a German professional golfer
- Isi Leibler (1934–2021), a Belgian-born Australian-Israeli Jewish activist
- Isi Metzstein (1928–2012), Isi Israel Metzstein, a German-born architect in Scotland
- Isi Naisarani (born 1995), Fijian–Australian rugby union player
- Isi Palazón (born 1994), Isaac Palazón Camacho, a Spanish football left winger
- Isi Ros (born 1995), Isidro Ros Ríos, a Spanish football winger
- Isi Siddiqui, Islam A. Siddiqui, American agricultural scientist and administrator
- Isi Tu'ungafasi (born 1995), Isileli J. Tu'ungafasi, Tongan–New Zealand rugby union player
- Isi Yanouka, Yitzhak Yanouka, Israeli diplomat

== See also ==
- Isi (disambiguation)
- Izzy, similar short name
- Isi & Ossi, a 2020 German romantic comedy film
- Joy Isi Bewaji, Nigerian writer
