= Izi mobil =

Mobile communications brand

Izi mobil is a brand in Bosnian mobile communications market. It was owned by Slovenian Izi mobil group.

It has its own numeration (067 XXX XXXX) and it is a prepaid product. It functions as a mobile virtual network operator (using m:tel).
