= Izi (Ancient Egyptian official) =

Izi was an important ancient Egyptian official of the Fourth Dynasty. His most important title was overseer of the treasury. Other important titles he hold are scribe of the king's document, overseer of the great house and overseer of the king's ornament.

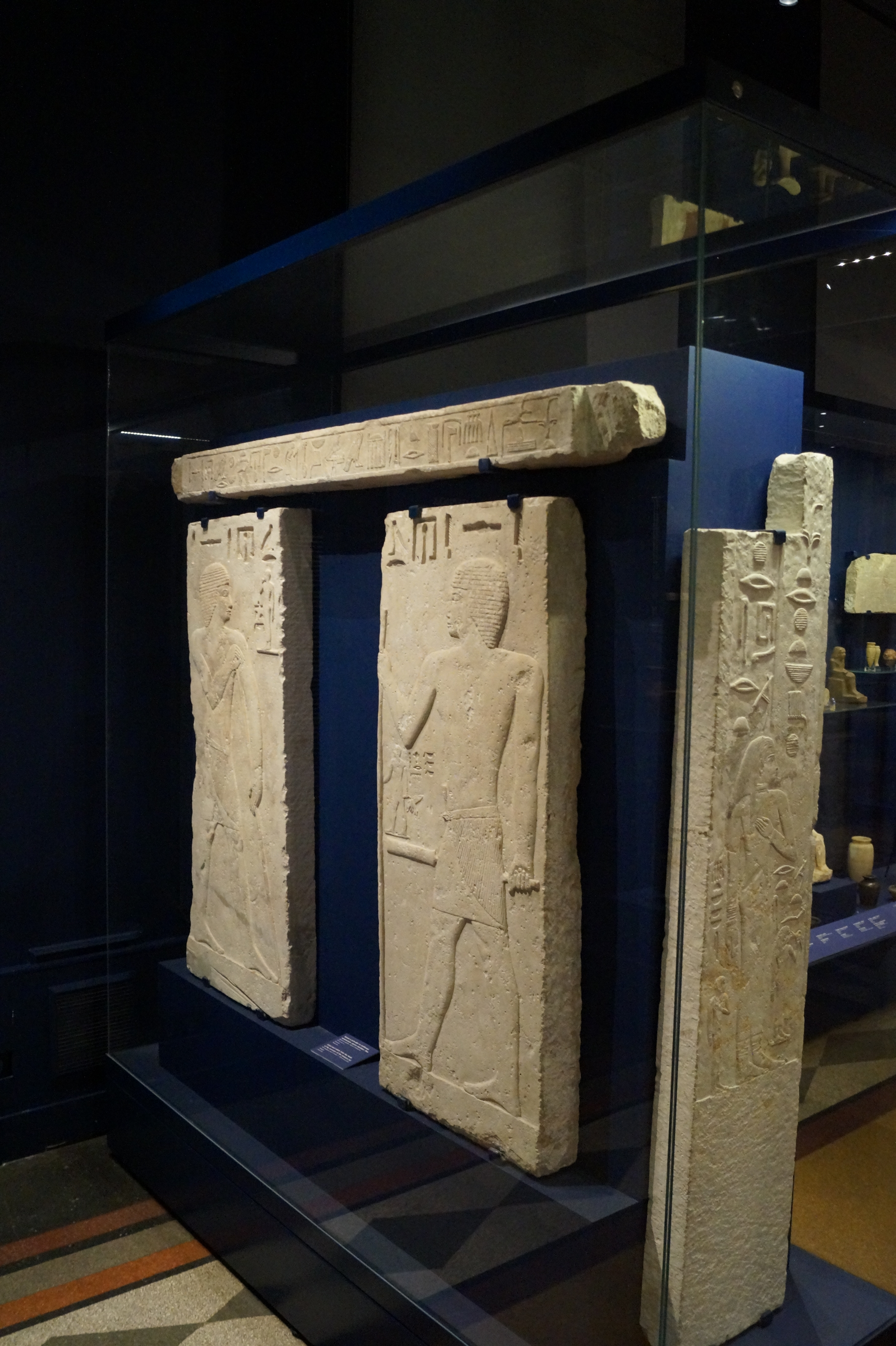
Reliefs from the mastaba of Izi (the three blocks on the left

Izi is mainly known from different relief decorated blocks of his mastaba. These blocks are now in the Egyptian Museum (Cairo), in the Pushkin Museum and in the Ny Carlsberg Glyptotek. On the latter blocks he bears different titles making it possible that they belong to a different person with the name Izi. His mastaba was discovered around 1890 at Saqqara. In the same year Vladimir Golenishchev bought eight blocks in Cairo for the Pushkin Museum. On stylistical grounds of the reliefs, Izi dates most likely to the Fourth Dynasty.

== Literature ==
- Hodjash, Svetlana; Berlev, Oleg (1982). The Egyptian Reliefs and Stelae in the Pushkin Museum of Fine Arts, Moscow. Leningrad.
- Strudwick, Nigel (1985). The Administration of Egypt in the Old Kingdom: The Highest Titles and Their Holders (PDF). Studies in Egyptology. London; Boston: Kegan Paul International. ISBN 978-0-7103-0107-9. Archived from the original (PDF) on 2014-04-03.
