= Izzy (singer) =

Brazilian singer and songwriter

- Born: Israela Silva Claro; July 15, 1990 (age 36); Rio de Janeiro, Brazil
- Occupations: Singer; songwriter
- Years active: 2012–present
- Musical career
- Genres: Pop; Latin pop; Reggaeton
- Instrument: Vocals
- Labels: TMG Records (2021 – present); Som Livre (2015)

Israela Silva Claro, known professionally as Izzy (previously by the stage name Izzy La Reina), is a Brazilian singer and songwriter based in Miami, Flórida.

Daughter of a pastor, singer and songwriter began to explore the horizons of Brazil with her father, singing with the church band and participating in Christian events. in 2013 she signed with Som Livre and released a gospel music EP entitled Sou Assim.

In 2021, the singer launched herself into pop and reggaeton music, with her debut single "Diabla". The song earned her millions of views on YouTube and reached the Dominican TOP200 on Spotify.

== Career ==
=== 2012–2015: Gospel career ===
Izzy La Reina started her career in music in 2012, as a gospel singer. The release of his first single called "Amém Amor", took place at Expo Cristã 2012 by the label Som Livre. In 2013, Israela released the single "Sou Assim", in partnership with Lito Atalaia.

In 2013, the artist was also nominated for the Troféu Promessas 2013, in the "Pra Curtir" category. In October of the same year, the artist released her debut EP called Sou Assim, on the Som Livre label, using soul, R&B and pop music styles.

=== 2021–present: pop career ===
In 2021, the artist began a new era in her career, leaving her roots in gospel and going to Latin music. Her first single "Diabla," was released in May 2021.

Also in 2021, she recorded a three-track acoustic project, recorded on a rooftoop in the Lapa neighborhood, the bohemian birthplace of Rio de Janeiro. the project features a new version of Diabla, her first single, released in August 2021. and versions of Triste com T, by singer Pabllo Vittar and Good 4 U, by pop star Olivia Rodrigo. The videos were made available on the artist's YouTube channel.

In 2022, Izzy released 5 singles, including the hit "Pa Ti", a partnership with Dominican rapper Amenazzy. The song "Pa Ti", signed by producer Light GM, reached the 9th position on the Billboard Latin Digital Song Sales chart and reached Dominican TOP50 on Spotify. In November 2022, "Pa Ti" won a Portuguese version in partnership with singer Tainá Costa.

== Discography ==
=== EPs ===
EP	Details
Sou Assim	Release: October 21, 2013; Formats: Digital Download; Label: Som Livre

=== Extended plays ===
Year	Title	Notes
2024	Forastera	Contains 5 tracks: "Safada", "Santa", "Perdedor", "Culpado", "Te Olvidé"
2025	Verano Infinito, Act I	(with WÖRRIES); Contains 6 tracks: "4D", "Supérame", "Mojadita", "Feliz Feliz", "Suave", "Adicción"
2025	Corazón Desnudo, Act II	(with WÖRRIES); Contains 5 tracks: "Latina Sensual", "Holy", "Bad Decision", "Boleto", "Corazón de fuego"

=== Singles ===
List of singles as lead artist, showing album name and year released

Year	Single	Album
2021	"Diabla"	—N/a
2021	"BOY TOY"	—N/a
2022	"La Oscuridad"	—N/a
2022	"Pa Ti" (with Amenazzy)	—N/a
2022	"1942"	—N/a
2022	"Aléjate"	—N/a
2022	"Pa Ti - Remix" (featuring Tainá Costa and DJ RD)	—N/a

==== As lead artist ====
Year	Single	Album
2023	"Solita"	–
2023	"Bootylandia" (featuring Kiko El Crazy)	–
2024	"Perdedor"	–
2024	"Colores" (with 8onthebeat, CANETARIA)	–
2024	"Culpado"	–
2024	"Santa"	–
2024	"Safada" (with Mc Gw, Hitzin)	–

==== As featured artist ====
Year	Single	Album
2025	"Mojadita" (with WÖRRIES)	–
2025	"Latina Sensual" (with WÖRRIES)	–
2025	"Holy" (with WÖRRIES)	–
