= Islamic School of Irving =

Location
- 2555 Esters Road; Irving, Texas 75062; United States; 32.8432°N 97.0109°W

Information
- Type: Private school
- Motto: Today's Learners Tomorrow's Leaders
- Established: 1996
- NCES School ID: A0303091
- Principal: Shahnaz Chowdhury
- Head of school: Leila Kayed
- Faculty: 64
- Grades: PreK-12
- Enrollment: 775 (2022-2023)
- Colors: Blue & white
- Website: islamicschoolofirving.org

Islamic School of Irving (ISI) is a prekindergarten through grade 12 Islamic school in Irving, Texas, in the Dallas-Fort Worth area. As of August 2022 it had 775 students. It opened with kindergarten students on October 21, 1996.

== History of ISI ==
ISI opened on October 21, 1996. The first program to be offered was Kindergarten, where six children were enrolled and graduated in July 1997. Two additional grades, first and second, were added during the 1997–1998 school year. In 1997–1998, ISI had nineteen students graduate from different elementary classes. Over the years, the school has elevated its grade programs and now serves pre-kindergarten all the way to twelfth grade. Currently, the school's enrollment has increased to more than 650 students. Years of planning by the Islamic Center of Irving and support from the local DFW community have contributed to establishing a high-quality resource of education for Muslim children from Irving and surrounding cities in DFW.

== Tanzeel Academy ==
Girls and Boys from ages five and up are able to learn and memorize the Quran. Tanzeel Academy supplies students with a full-time Quran or part-time Quran memorization and learning programs that enhance students' learning and spiritual outcomes. The program allows students to memorize the Quran from cover to cover and recite the surahs fluently. While attending the program, students also study their core subjects and transition between their academic subjects of Math, Science, and English along with their Quran memorization.

== Awards and Certifications ==
=== Ranked in the Top 5,000 STEM High Schools in the United States of America ===
- According to Newsweek and STEM.org, ISI was ranked as one of the best 5,000 STEM high schools around the United States. Thirty thousand high schools across the nation were analyzed over a three-year period, and out of those 30,000 schools, ISI ranked 2268.
