= Easy for You to Say =

Easy for You to Say may refer to:

- "Easy for You to Say", a song by 5 Seconds of Summer from 5SOS5 (2022)
- "Easy for You to Say", a song by Linda Ronstadt from Get Closer (1982)
