= İsi =

Coordinates: 38°59′N 48°35′E

- Village and Municipality
- Interactive map of İsi
- Country: Azerbaijan
- Rayon: Masally

Population
  - Total: 186
- Time zone: UTC+4 (AZT)
  - Summer (DST): UTC+5 (AZT)

İsi is a talysh village and municipality in the Masally Rayon of Azerbaijan. It has a population of 186.
