= Izi (overseer of the treasury) =

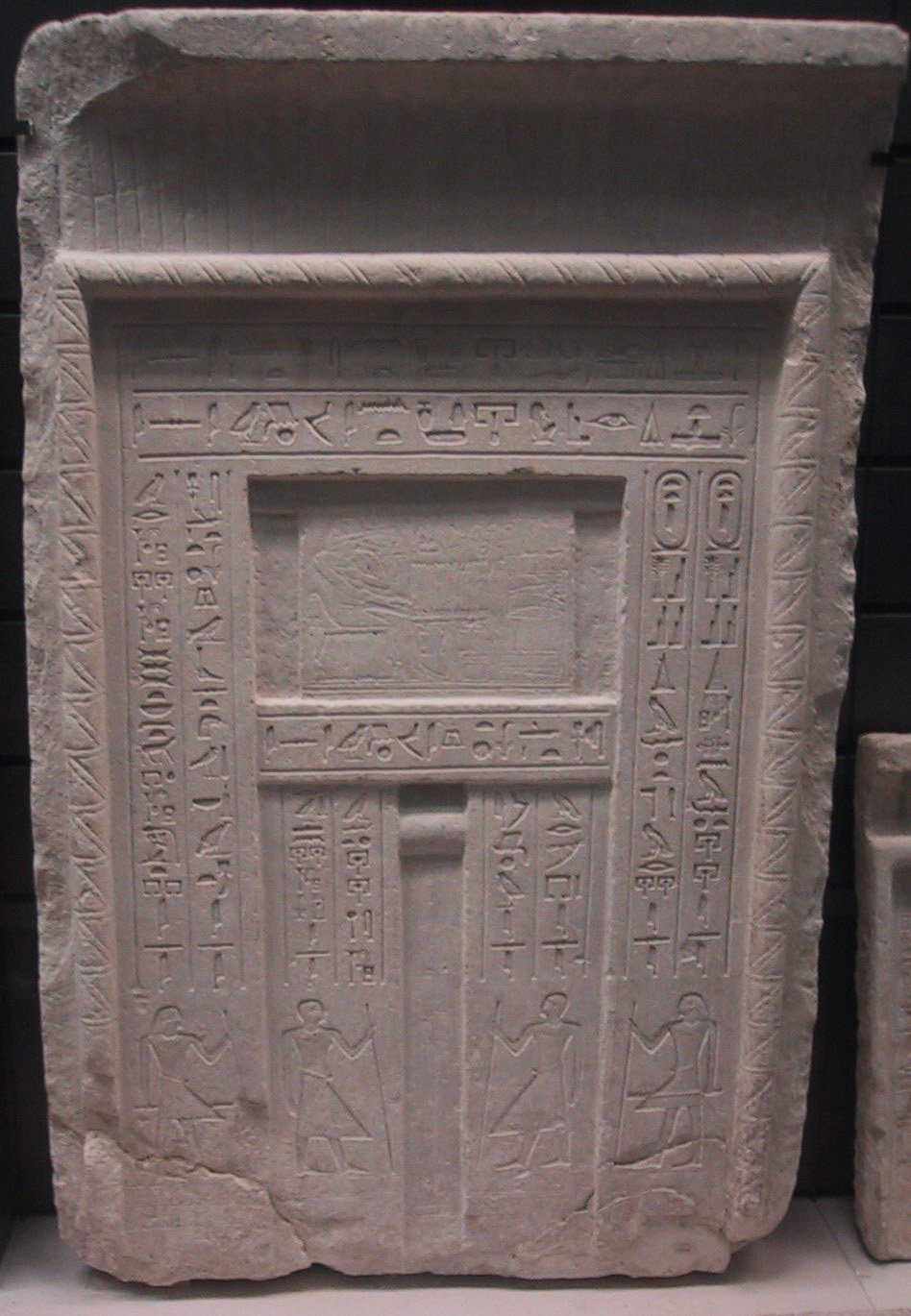
False door of Izi (Louvre C 164 (E 3904))

Izi was an important ancient Egyptian official at the end of the Old Kingdom (c. 2700–2200 BC) or First Intermediate Period (c. 2200–2000 BC). His most important title was overseer of the treasury. He belonged therefore to the most powerful officials at the royal court. Other important titles he hold include priest at Djed-sut-Teti (Djed-sut-Teti is the name of the Pyramid of Teti), and overseer of scribes of the treasury and sole friend. Izi is mainly known from a false door that is now in the Louvre Museum. It is not known where it was found, but Saqqara seems to be the most likely option. His exact dating is problematic. He served at the pyramid of king Teti and must therefore date under this king or later. Due to some observations on his false door, he might date to the end of the 6th Dynasty or even beyond.

== Literature ==
- Strudwick, Nigel (1985). The Administration of Egypt in the Old Kingdom: The Highest Titles and Their Holders (PDF). Studies in Egyptology. London; Boston: Kegan Paul International. ISBN 978-0-7103-0107-9. Archived from the original (PDF) on 2014-04-03.
- Ziegler, Christiane (1990)ː Catalogue des stèles, peintures et reliefs égyptiens de l'Ancien Empire et de la Première Période Intermédiaire : vers 2686-2040 avant J.-C., [Musée du Louvre, Paris. Département des Antiquités égyptiennes], Paris, Réunion des musées nationaux, 1990, ISBN 2711822281. p. 82-85, ill. p. 83, 85, n. 10

== Weblinks ==
Louvre: False door of Isi (Inventory number E 3909, C 164) on : collections.louvre.fr/
