= Ibexa DXP =

Content management system

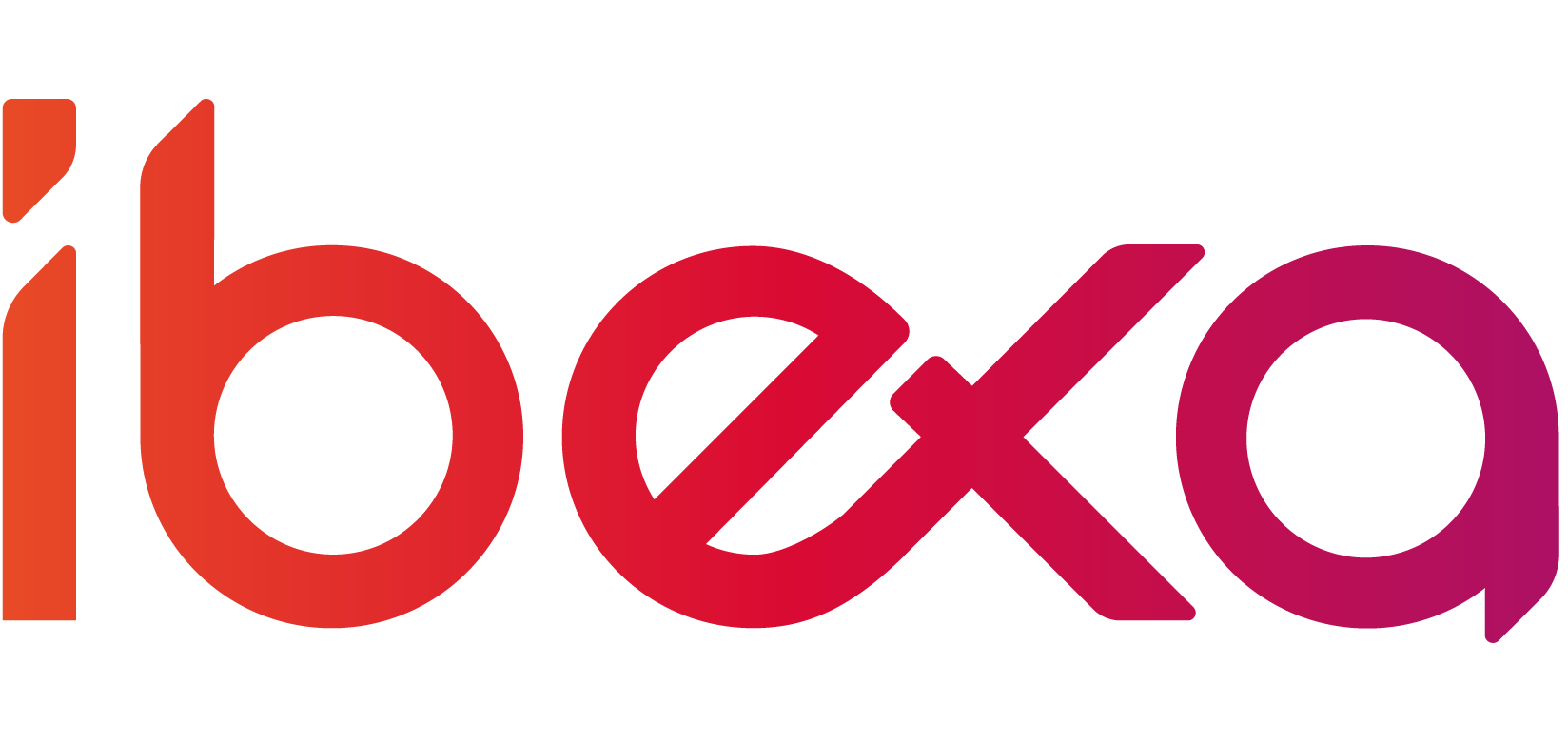
- Developer: Ibexa
- Release: 15 December 2015
- Stable release: 4.6 / 2024-02-13[±]
- Operating system: Cross-platform
- Platform: PHP, Full Stack Symfony Framework
- Type: Digital Experience Platform
- License: GNU General Public License
- Website: https://www.ibexa.co/

Ibexa DXP is a composable Digital Experience Platform (DXP), with end-to-end content management, CDP, e-commerce, and workflow automation capabilities. The product offering includes Ibexa Headless, Ibexa Experience, and Ibexa Commerce. The company is headquartered in Oslo, Norway and operates across Europe. Ibexa is part of the QNTM Group.

== History ==
Ibexa DXP is the successor to eZ Platform, which is the successor to eZ Publish, an Open Source CMS in development since 1999. eZ Publish 5 was the release which introduced the possibility of running both legacy code and new Symfony based code. eZ Platform dropped all the legacy code from the software and completed the transition to a complete new code base built on the Symfony Full Stack Framework. The content repository core and user interface are rewritten, but retains the same concepts as the previous eZ Publish software as well as adding more functionality.

The initial version of Ibexa DXP, then known as eZ Platform, was released on December 15, 2015.

On April 2, 2020, the then named eZ Systems released eZ Platform Version 3, the next generation of its Digital eXperience Platform (DXP).

Later that month, on April 27, 2020, eZ Systems announced its rebranding to Ibexa, reflecting a shift in the company's strategic direction and product positioning. The rebranding was further reinforced on October 26, 2020, with the release of Ibexa DXP 3.2, which replaced the earlier eZ Platform 3.1 under the new brand.

Ibexa DXP has since been offered in multiple editions, initially named Content, Experience, and Commerce. In the 4.6 release, the Content edition was renamed Headless to better align with its functionality.

The latest stable and long-term supported version was released on February 13, 2024.

== Acquisitions ==
On November 19, 2021, QNTM Group, a leading European MarTech group headquartered in Norway, acquired Ibexa.

On December 17, 2024, Ibexa merged with Quable, a provider of a Product Information Management (PIM) solution for brands and manufacturers.

On January 13, 2025, Ibexa revealed a strategic merger with Raptor, a provider of Customer Data Platform (CDP), recommendation, and personalization solutions.

== Features and relation to the Symfony Framework ==
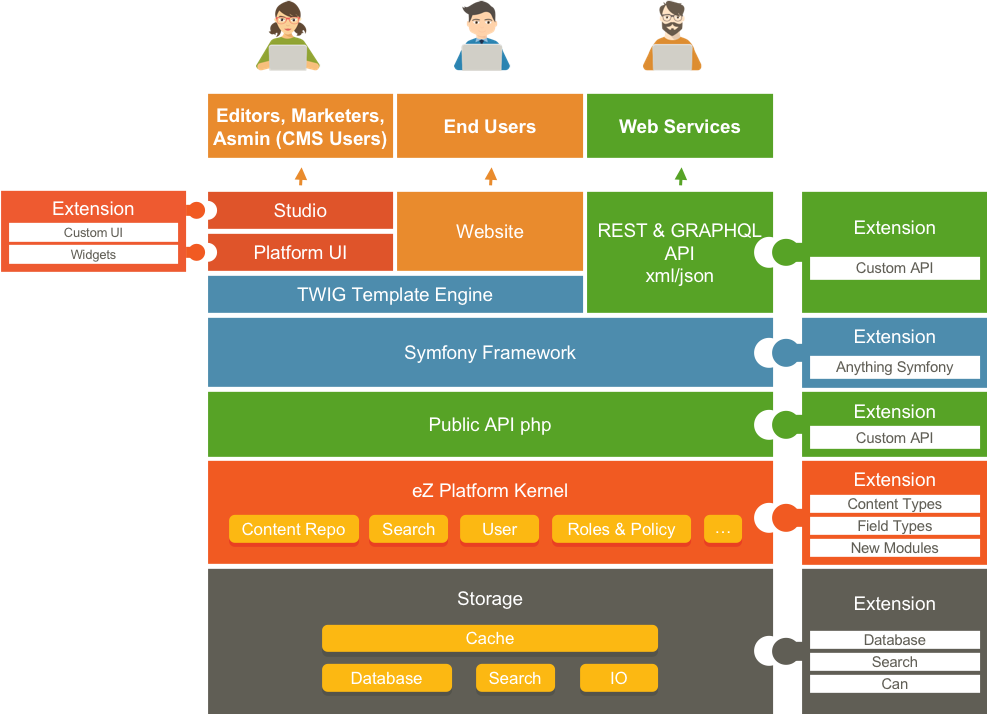
This diagram represents eZ Platform software architecture as of its version 2.

Ibexa DXP is built on the Symfony Full Stack Framework. Since Ibexa DXP is based on the complete framework, developers can integrate any Symfony extension (i.e. bundle) into Ibexa DXP to add more functionality and, vice versa, Symfony developers can integrate Ibexa DXP into their Symfony projects. Ibexa DXP itself is — in Symfony terms — a number of bundles standing on top of Symfony which add features such as:

- A content repository with multilingual capabilities and versioning
- A User Interface for managing the content repository
- REST and GraphQL APIs for interacting with the content repository using JavaScript or other clients
- A Siteaccess configuration model for matching URLs to provide views to the repository
- User and permission management to control access into the repository
- Integrated Solr search engine for performance and search features.
