= Izzy Gomez (restaurateur) =

Isadore Gomez
- Born: 1875 or 1876; Portugal
- Died: June 21, 1944 (aged 68); Alameda, California, U.S.
- Other name: Izzy Gomez
- Occupations: Chef, restaurateur

Isadore Gomez (died June 21, 1944, in Alameda, California, at the age of 68) was a Portuguese immigrant, chef and restaurateur in the North Beach neighborhood of San Francisco, California. In 1943, he was recognized by LIFE magazine as one of San Francisco's more colorful characters.

Gomez left his home in Portugal when he was 18 and made his way to San Francisco. According to his obituary, he arrived in the city penniless, and "friends said his unrecorded charities had kept him that way". He landed his first job as a "swamper" in a local gin-joint on the infamous Barbary Coast. He managed to save enough to buy a small bar at 848 Pacific Avenue. During Prohibition, with his Isadore Gomez' Café, he became known as the city's most beloved violator of the Volstead Act. In 1933, he served a 30-day jail term for bootlegging. Ten years later, in February 1943, Gomez received a presidential pardon.

One of Gomez's great fans was the Armenian-American writer William Saroyan. His famous play The Time of Your Life is about Gomez and is set at Izzy's saloon. Saroyan wrote in his journals that Gomez's place was downtown, "not far from the old Montgomery block, across from the firehouse at First and Pacific". He went on to write:

Izzy Gomez's was something else. Unique. Sui generis. It really was as portrayed in The Time of Your Life, except that it was also a hangout for hard-boiled, sophisticated newspapermen...They gave the place a rowdy, slightly underworld character of half-suppressed brawl...For meals, Izzy served thick, luscious steaks, french fries, and salads. He gave a considerable number of meals and liquor out free, not just to starving artists, but to people he liked.

Izzy's saloon was demolished in 1952. There are currently two steakhouses in the San Francisco Bay Area under the same ownership named after Izzy.

== Notes ==
- "San Francisco"; photographic essay. (July 12, 1943). LIFE, p. 78.
- Max, Gerry, Richard Halliburton and the Voyage of the Sea Dragon, 2020, University of Tennessee-Knoxville, on Izzy Gomez and other San Francisco hangouts for reporters and sailors during the Golden Gate International Exposition of 1939-1940, pp. 38-39, 190.
