= Integral Satcom Initiative =

ICT ETC Initiative

The Integral SatCom Initiative (ISI) was an Information and Communications Technologies (ICT) European Technology Platform (ETP) led by the European SatCom industry and supported by the European Commission to address Satellite Communications (SatCom) strategic research and innovation challenges. It gathered approximately 200 member organisations representing all the stakeholders of the European SatCom sector from 29 different countries. It included members from manufacturing industry, network operations and service provision, SMEs, research centres and academia, European and National Institutions. Some international (non European) research entities do also participate. In 2013, after a public call by the European Commission to re-structure ETPs to better fit Horizon 2020 interests, ISI formally merged with Net!Works ETP to form NetWorld ETP, bringing together almost 1,000 partner organisations. NetWorld would become the partner ETP in the contractual public-private innovation partnership on 5G Infrastructures with the EU in December 2013.

The ISI European Technology Platform activities addressed in a unified way, all research, technology and innovation aspects related to satellite communications, including mobile, broadband, and broadcasting applications.

== Objectives ==
ISI objectives are:

- to define and harmonize the enabling research priorities for emerging SatCom solutions across the European SatCom industry sector in order to contribute to make the European SatCom industry more competitive, thus joining to the overall European ICT pillar;
- to provide network and end-user applications and services capable to target European societal challenges;
- to foster the development of innovative technologies, products and services up to in-orbit validation and large scale pre-operational experimentations that will enable the development/deployment of future satellite network infrastructures.

== Activities ==
Activities within ISI are internally organized into the following Working Groups:

- Regulatory & Standards Working Group aims at identifying the regulatory and standardization issues that may affect the deployment of future SatCom systems, services and applications.
- Market & SatCom Solutions Working Group aims at identifying the positioning of future SatCom solutions in three domains: Security, Broadband for All, and Future Internet. It provides recommendations for relevant missions and users’ needs, which serve as guidelines to define the relevant R&D themes.
- R&D Working Group aims at maintaining and updating the ISI Strategic Research and Innovation Agenda (SRIA) and ensuring its implementation for the development of the SatCom sector in Europe.
- Policy and Promotion Working Group aims at demonstrating how the planned ISI research and innovation activities will support the European policies. It also promotes the need for institutional financial support to the European SatCom industry's research and innovation activities.
- ISICOM Task Force is an “ad hoc” Working Group set up to define the specific research & technology roadmap for satellite networks supporting institutional related missions, including security.

The ISI reference and working documents are publicly available on the ISI Website. These include among others the

- ISI Vision document
- ISI Strategic Research and Innovation Agenda
- Executive ISICOM summary
- Position Paper on Future Internet

== See also ==
- European Technology Platform
- Satellite Communications
