= Sir John Wedgwood, 2nd Baronet =

British politician and industrialist

Sir John Wedgwood Bt TD
- Wedgwood in 1933, on his wedding day
- Born: John Hamilton Wedgwood; 16 November 1907
- Died: 9 December 1989 (aged 82)
- Education: Winchester College
- Alma mater: Trinity College, Cambridge
- Known for: Politician and industrialist
- Spouses: Diana Hawkshaw (m. 1933; died 1976) Pamela Tudor-Craig (m. 1982)
- Children: 5, including Martin
- Parents: Sir Ralph Wedgwood, 1st Baronet (father); Iris Wedgwood (mother)
- Relatives: Josiah Wedgwood (great-great-great-grandfather); James Meadows Rendel (great-grandfather); Francis Wedgwood (great-grandfather); C. V. Wedgwood (sister); Josiah Wedgwood, 1st Baron Wedgwood (uncle); Francis Wedgwood, 2nd Baron Wedgwood (cousin); Josiah Wedgwood V (cousin); Camilla Wedgwood (cousin); John Wedgwood (second cousin); Alexandra Wedgwood (daughter-in-law); Ralph Wedgwood (grandson)

Sir John Hamilton Wedgwood, 2nd Baronet, TD (16 November 1907 – 9 December 1989) was a British politician and industrialist.

== Biography ==
Born in Newcastle upon Tyne, Wedgwood was the son of Sir Ralph Wedgwood, 1st Baronet and his wife Iris Veronica Pawson, daughter of Albert Henry Pawson. His younger sister was the historian C.V. Wedgwood. Sir John was educated at Winchester College, at Trinity College, Cambridge and in Europe, where he learnt several languages.

He married his second cousin Diane Mildred Hawkshaw (1908−1976), granddaughter of William Forsyth QC, on 6 April 1933. They had five children.

- Sir Hugo Martin Wedgwood, 3rd Baronet
- John Julian Wedgwood (born 17 June 1936)
- Oliver Ralph Wedgwood (born 27 April 1940)
- Germaine Olivia Wedgwood (born 5 May 1944)
- Adrian Charles Hamilton Wedgwood (10 June 1948 − 9 June 1974)

He joined the family pottery firm in 1931 and was appointed Deputy Chairman in 1955. He worked as a travelling salesman and representative of the firm, a role which took him across the globe.

During the Second World War he served as a Military Intelligence Staff Officer in the Arctic and in Italy. In 1948 he rejoined the Territorial Army and became the 2nd in command of the North Staffordshire Regiment.

On 30 April 1982, after the death of his first wife, he remarried Pamela Tudor-Craig, a medieval art historian. His uncle Josiah Wedgwood, 1st Baron Wedgwood had been a Liberal and Labour politician and cabinet minister. John Wedgwood stood for the Liberals at the 1945 election at Stone, but was not elected. He then deserted the Liberals to become the Conservative Party's candidate for Leek, but was not elected there either. He did however serve as magistrate for Stone, Staffordshire.

Wedgwood had a love for outdoor pursuits, particularly cave diving and mountain climbing. He was a life vice-president of the British Sub Aqua Club. He inherited the Wedgwood Baronetcy on the death of his father on 5 September 1956. On his own death in 1989 the baronetcy passed to his son Martin.

Baronetage of the United Kingdom
Preceded by Sir Ralph Wedgwood	Baronet (of Etruria); 1956–1989	Succeeded by Sir Martin Wedgwood
