= Elizabeth Tudor (disambiguation) =

Elizabeth Tudor (1533–1603; r. 1558–1603) was Queen of England.

Elizabeth Tudor may also refer to:

- Elizabeth of York (1466–1503), queen consort of Henry VII Tudor, King of England
- Elizabeth Tudor (1492–1495), second daughter of Henry VII Tudor, King of England
- Elizabeth Tudor (writer) (born 1978), Azerbaijani science fiction writer

== See also ==
- Elizabeth Blount (c. 1500 – 1540), mistress of Henry VIII Tudor, King of England
- Elizabeth Knollys (1549 – c. 1605), courtier of Elizabeth Tudor
- Elizabeth J. Tudor-Craig (born 1960), British environmental artist
- Elizabeth I (disambiguation)
- Elizabeth of England (disambiguation)
