= Tudor-Craig =

Tudor-Craig is a surname. Notable people with the surname include:

- Algernon Tudor-Craig (1873–1943), British Army officer
- Lil Tudor-Craig (born 1960), British conservationist
- Pamela Tudor-Craig (1928–2017), British art historian
