= John Wedgwood =

John Wedgwood may refer to:

- John Wedgwood (1721–1767), merchant of London
- John Wedgwood (horticulturist) (1766–1844), founder of the Royal Horticultural Society and son of Josiah Wedgwood
- J. T. Wedgwood (John Taylor Wedgwood, 1782–1856), line engraver
- John Allen Wedgwood (1796–1882), usually known as Allen Wedgwood, vicar of Maer, Staffordshire
- Sir John Wedgwood, 2nd Baronet (1907–1989), British politician and industrialist
- John Wedgwood (doctor) (1919–2007), British physician
