= Elizabeth of England (disambiguation) =

Elizabeth of England (1533–1603; r. 1558–1603) was Queen of England.

Elizabeth of England may also refer to:

- Elizabeth of Great Britain (disambiguation), various princesses, including
  - Elizabeth II (1926–2022; r. 1952–2022), Queen of the United Kingdom
- Elizabeth of Rhuddlan (1282–1316), youngest daughter of Edward I
- Elizabeth Woodville (c. 1437 – 1492), queen consort of Edward IV
- Elizabeth of York, Duchess of Suffolk (1444 – c. 1503), sister of Edward IV and Richard III
- Elizabeth of York (1466–1503), queen consort of Henry VII
- Elizabeth Tudor (1492–1495), second daughter of Henry VII
- Elizabeth Stuart, Queen of Bohemia (1596–1662), only surviving daughter of James I
- Elizabeth Stuart (daughter of Charles I) (1635–1650)

== See also ==
- Elizabeth I (disambiguation)
- Elizabeth the Queen Mother (disambiguation)
- Elizabeth Tudor (disambiguation)
- Princess Elizabeth (disambiguation)
- Queen Elizabeth (disambiguation)
