= Edward Tudor (disambiguation) =

Edward Tudor (1537–1553) was Edward VI of England and son of Henry VIII and Jane Seymour.

Edward Tudor may also refer to:

- Edward Tudor, Prince of England, son of Henry VII of England and Elizabeth of York
- Edward Tudor (impostor), imposter crowned as Edward VI in Ireland in 1487
- Edward Tudor (uncle of Henry VII), son of Owen Tudor and Queen Catherine

== See also ==
- Edward Tudor-Pole (born 1954), singer
- Ted Tudor (born 1935), English footballer
- Edmund Tudor (disambiguation)
