= Sir Ralph Wedgwood, 1st Baronet =

British railroad manager (1874–1956)

Brigadier-General Sir Ralph Wedgwood Bt CB CMG TD
- Wedgwood in December 1922
- Born: Ralph Lewis Wedgwood; 2 March 1874; Barlaston Lea, Stoke-on-Trent, Staffordshire, England
- Died: 5 September 1956 (aged 82)
- Education: Trinity College, Cambridge
- Spouse: Iris Pawson (m. 1906)
- Children: 3, including John and Cicely
- Father: Clement Wedgwood
- Relatives: Josiah Wedgwood (great-great-grandfather); James Meadows Rendel (maternal grandfather); Josiah Wedgwood, 1st Baron Wedgwood (brother); Francis Wedgwood, 2nd Baron Wedgwood (nephew); Josiah Wedgwood V (nephew); Camilla Wedgwood (niece); John Wedgwood (great-nephew)

Sir Ralph Lewis Wedgwood, 1st Baronet (/reɪf/ RAYF; 2 March 1874 – 5 September 1956) was the chief officer of the London and North Eastern Railway (LNER) for 16 years from its inauguration in 1923. He was chairman of the wartime Railway Executive Committee from September 1939 to August 1941.

== Biography ==
Wedgwood was born at Barlaston Lea, Stoke-on-Trent, the son of Clement Wedgwood and his wife Emily, daughter of the engineer James Meadows Rendel. His elder brother was Josiah Wedgwood, 1st Baron Wedgwood. He was educated at Clifton College and Trinity College, Cambridge, where he became a member of the Cambridge Apostles. He was close friends there with his second cousin, Ralph Vaughan Williams, who later dedicated two of his works to him, "In the Fen Country" and "A Sea Symphony". Along with Richard Curle, Wedgwood was executor of Joseph Conrad's estate from Conrad's death in 1924 until 1944, when responsibility was transferred to the author's son John Conrad and the law firm Withers.

After graduating, Wedgwood was recruited by Sir George Gibb to the North Eastern Railway. After a period of general training, he was appointed Assistant Dock Superintendent at West Hartlepool from 1 May 1900, at a salary of £250 per annum. Two years later he was appointed District Superintendent at Middlesbrough, and was promoted to Divisional Goods & Mineral Manager, Newcastle, in 1905. When Eric Geddes became Deputy General Manager in 1912, Wedgwood succeeded him as Chief Goods Manager. After war service with the Ministry of Munitions (when he held the rank of Brigadier-General) he returned to the North Eastern Railway in 1919 as Deputy General Manager. When Sir Alexander Kaye Butterworth retired, Wedgwood succeeded him as General Manager for the last year of the NER's existence, and was selected as Chief General Manager of the London & North Eastern Railway from its formation on 1 January 1923. Wedgwood was appointed a Companion of the Order of St Michael and St George (CMG) in 1917, and was appointed a Companion of the Order of the Bath (CB) in 1918. He was knighted in the 1924 Birthday Honours and created a baronet on 20 January 1942.

He married Iris Veronica Pawson, daughter of Albert Henry Pawson on 24 October 1906 at St. Margaret's, Westminster. They had two children who survived to adulthood; John Hamilton Wedgwood (1907–1989), second baronet and Cicely Veronica Wedgwood (1910–1997), historian. A second son, Ralph Pawson Wedgwood was born and died in 1909.

An A4 Class locomotive, 4469 Sir Ralph Wedgwood, was named after him but it was destroyed at York locomotive shed by bombing in the "Baedeker Raid" of 29 April 1942 during the Second World War. His name was later given to A4 Class 4466.

Baronetage of the United Kingdom
New title	Baronet (of Etruria); 1942–1956	Succeeded by John Hamilton Wedgwood
