= Ralph Wedgwood =

Ralph Wedgwood may refer to:

- Ralph Wedgwood (inventor) (1766–1837), English inventor
- Sir Ralph Wedgwood, 1st Baronet (1874–1956), British businessman
- Sir Ralph Wedgwood, 4th Baronet (born 1964), British philosopher
