= Edmund Tudor =

Edmund Tudor may refer to:

- Edmund Tudor, 1st Earl of Richmond, father of Henry VII
- Edmund Tudor, Duke of Somerset, son of Henry VII

== See also ==
- Edward Tudor (disambiguation)
