= Iris Wedgwood =

British author

Iris Veronica, Lady Wedgwood, (née Pawson; 1887 – 17 February 1982) was a British author of novels and non-fiction works on the topography and history of England.

== Life ==
Iris Wedgwood was the daughter of Albert Henry Pawson (1850–1935) of Farnley, Leeds, a fellow of the Linnean Society of London and the son of William Pawson who had been the Mayor of Leeds in 1841. She became engaged to Ralph Lewis Wedgwood in 1905, and on 24 October 1906 they were married in St Margaret's, Westminster. Shortly after her marriage, she met the philosopher G. E. Moore, who had been at Cambridge with her husband, and became his closest female friend. Other friends of the couple with whom she maintained a correspondence were the writer Joseph Conrad and the composer Ralph Vaughan Williams. Vaughan Williams (a second cousin and lifelong friend of Ralph Wedgwood) wrote to him on hearing of his engagement to Iris:

I am so glad... You have everything to make a wife happy for ever and ever—you have everything in you which cries out for it. [...] I would venture to send a message to Iris (may I call her so?) if I dared, so if I may you can invent one for me—you will do it so much better than I shall! Bless you. This is quite illegible, but my hand shakes from excitement.

Very early in their marriage, Vaughan Williams stayed at the Wedgwoods' home in Northumberland with his colleague Cecil Sharp, and in 1944 Iris and Ralph became the tenants of Vaughan Williams' childhood home, Leith Hill Place near Holmbury St Mary in Surrey. She first met Joseph Conrad in 1913 through his friend Richard Curle who was staying at Stonefall Hall, the Wedgwoods' house near Harrogate. Conrad dedicated his short story collection Within the Tides (1915) to her and her husband.

Iris Wedgwood became Lady Wedgwood upon her husband's appointment as a Knight Bachelor in 1924. (He was subsequently created the first Baronet Wedgwood of Etruria in 1942.) They had three children: John Hamilton Wedgwood (1907–1989), Ralph Pawson Wedgwood (born and died in 1909), and Cicely Veronica Wedgwood (1910–1997) who became a noted historian of the English Civil War and early 17th-century Europe.

== Works ==
Novels

- The Livelong Day. London: Christophers (1925)
- The Iron Age. London: Hutchinson & Co. (1927)
- Perilous Seas. London: Hutchinson & Co. (1928)
- The Fairway. London: Hutchinson & Co. (1929)

Non-fiction

- Northumberland and Durham. London: Faber & Faber (1932)
- Fenland Rivers: Impressions of the Fen Counties (with drawings by Henry Rushbury). London: Rich & Cowan (1936)

== Reception ==
- The Geographical Magazine called Fenland Rivers "A pleasantly rambling description of the fen country".

== Notes and references ==
Further sources

- Conrad, Joseph; Karl, Frederick Robert; Davies, Laurence (1996). The Collected Letters of Joseph Conrad: 1912-1916. Cambridge University Press. p. 408. ISBN 978-0-521-32389-5.
- Conrad, Joseph; Davies, Laurence; Moore, G. M. (2008). The Collected Letters of Joseph Conrad, Volume 8; Volumes 1923-1924. Cambridge University Press. ISBN 0-521-56197-3
