= Francis Wedgwood =

Francis Wedgwood may refer to:

- Francis Wedgwood (1800–1888), English potter
- Francis Wedgwood, 2nd Baron Wedgwood (1898–1959), English baron
- Francis Hamilton Wedgwood (1867–1930), English sheriff and businessman
