= Edmund of England =

Edmund of England may refer to:

- Edmund I of England (921–946), King of the English, also known as Edmund the Elder
- Edmund Ironside (died 1016), King of the English, also known as Edmund II
- Edmund of Langley, 1st Duke of York (1341–1402), son of King Edward III of England
- Edmund Tudor, Duke of Somerset (1499–1500), son of King Henry VII of England
