= C. V. Wedgwood =

English historian (1910–1997)

Dame Veronica Wedgwood OM DBE FBA FRHistS
- Wedgwood in 1969, by Godfrey Argent
- Born: Cicely Veronica Wedgwood; 20 July 1910; Stocksfield, Northumberland, England
- Died: 9 March 1997 (aged 86); London, England
- Education: Lady Margaret Hall, Oxford
- Occupation: Historian
- Partner: Jacqueline Hope-Wallace
- Relatives: Sir Ralph Wedgwood (father); Iris Wedgwood (mother); John Hamilton Wedgwood (brother)
- Writing career
- Period: 1935–1987
- Subject: 17th century Europe
- Notable work: The Thirty Years War (1938)

Dame Cicely Veronica Wedgwood, OM, DBE, FBA, FRHistS (20 July 1910 – 9 March 1997) was an English historian who published under the name C. V. Wedgwood. Specializing in the history of 17th-century England and continental Europe, her biographies and narrative histories are said to have provided a clear, entertaining middle ground between popular and scholarly works.

== Early life ==
Wedgwood was born in Stocksfield, Northumberland, on 20 July 1910. She was the only daughter of Sir Ralph Wedgwood, Bt, a railway executive, and his wife Iris Wedgwood (née Pawson), a novelist and travel writer. Her brother was the politician and industrialist Sir John Wedgwood. Veronica Wedgwood was a great-great-great-granddaughter of the potter and abolitionist Josiah Wedgwood. Her uncle was the politician Josiah Wedgwood, later 1st Baron Wedgwood.

She was educated at home, and then at Norland Place School. She earned a First in Classics and Modern History at Lady Margaret Hall, Oxford, where A. L. Rowse said she was "my first outstanding pupil". In 1932, she enrolled for a PhD at the London School of Economics under the supervision of R. H. Tawney, but never completed it.

== Career ==
Wedgwood published her first biography, Strafford, at the age of 25 and The Thirty Years War, "her big book ... covering a large canvas", according to Rowse, just three years later, a work Patrick Leigh Fermor called "[b]y far the best and most exciting book on the whole period".

She specialised in European history of the 16th and 17th centuries. Her work in continental European history included the major study The Thirty Years War (1938) and biographies of William the Silent and Cardinal Richelieu. She devoted the greater part of her research to English history, especially in the English Civil War. Her major works included a biography of Oliver Cromwell and two volumes of a planned trilogy, The Great Rebellion, which included The King's Peace (1955) and The King's War (1958). She continued the story with The Trial of Charles I (1964). She was known to walk battlefields and experience the same weather and field conditions as the subjects of her histories, mindful that Cromwell had no military experience and most participants in the English Civil War were "talented amateurs" when it came to military manoeuvres. The subject was one of great controversy and rival schools of historical interpretations, but she held herself apart, "probably put off by the sheer scholasticism into which the treatment of the subject had degenerated, the rudeness with which academics treated each other over it, when she herself was always courteous and lady-like." Instead, "what was remarkable about Wedgwood's view of the Civil War was the way in which she depicted the sheer confusion of it all, the impossibility of co-ordinating events in three countries, once order from the centre had broken down".

Of William the Silent (1944), Rowse wrote that she "displayed not only a mastery of research but maturity of judgement, with a literary capacity not common in academic writing. She wrote indeed to be read, and not surprisingly the book began for her a long procession of prizes and honours..." The New York Times singled it out as a landmark: "Miracles do happen. A generation ago the young English woman historian was often tethered to a dry theme until she had nibbled it bald. Today she dares much more to select a major subject", and praised her scholarship for balancing complex details with human drama: "Miss Wedgwood has not faltered before the intricacy or magnitude of this checkered struggle, and hers is a glowing, substantial, ingeniously organized book."

Thirty years after she published a biography of Thomas Wentworth, Earl of Strafford, she published a much-revised version that was considerably more critical of her subject. In the earlier version she called him a "sincere, brave and able man". After using a collection of his family's papers that had not previously been available, she deemed him greedy and unscrupulous.

She was well regarded in academic circles and her books were widely read. She was also successful as a lecturer and broadcaster. In 1953 the BBC invited her to present her impressions of the coronation of Elizabeth II. (Note: The other women invited along with Wedgwood were Elizabeth Bowen and Rose Macaulay, though Macaulay's was "too mischievous to use", according to Bowen's biographer.) She was a tutor at Somerville College, Oxford, and she was a Special Lecturer at University College London from 1962 to 1991. According to The Economist, she "had a novelist's talent for entering into the character of the giants of history." She published using her initials C.V. as a nom de plume to disguise her gender, aware of prejudice against women as serious historians. (Note: Edmund Crispin in his 1977 crime novel The Glimpses of the Moon uses Wedgwood's open disguise in reference to one of his characters, Father Hattrick, a Roman Catholic priest, who now wears trousers rather than the cassock that was once required. "Under another name," Crispin writes, "he's a sort of male C.V. Wedgwood.") She wrote as well about the historian's responsibility to do more than analyse or describe. Rather than pose as a disinterested observer, she wrote: "Historians should always draw morals." She offered her own alternative to the neatness provided by theory: "[T]he whole value of the study of history is for me its delightful undermining of certainty, its cumulative insistence of the differences of point of view ... it is not lack of prejudice which makes for dull history, but lack of passion."

George Steiner, complaining that "[m]uch of what passes for history at present is scarcely literate", set Wedgwood apart:

One of the few contemporary historians prepared to defend openly the poetic nature of all historical imagining is C. V. Wedgwood. She fully concedes that all style brings with it the possibility of distortion: "There is no literary style which may not at some point take away something from the ascertainable outline of truth, which it is the task of scholarship to excavate and re-establish."

She acknowledged that contemporary concerns affected her historical assessments. In the 1957 introduction to a new release of The Thirty Years War, which first appeared in 1938, she wrote: "I wrote this book in the thirties, against the background of depression at home and mounting tension abroad. The preoccupations of that unhappy time cast their shadows over its pages." She replied to critics of her attention to biography and the role of the individual in history:

The individual—stupendous and beautiful paradox—is at once infinitesimal dust and the cause of all things. ... I prefer this overestimate to the opposite method which treats developments as though they were the massive anonymous waves of an inhuman sea or pulverizes the fallible surviving records of human life into the grey dust of statistics.

Her biographies and narrative histories are said to have "provided a clear, entertaining middle ground between popular and scholarly works".

By 1966 her reputation and notoriety were sufficient to allow the authors of a study of The Nature of Narrative to invoke her name in reference to the tradition of historical scholarship: "... medieval traditional poetic narratives contained allusions to verifiable historical events [although] their history was not such as Tacitus, Bede, or C. V. Wedgwood might have written."

In 1946 she translated Elias Canetti's Die Blendung, as Auto-da-Fé, under the author's supervision, though a modern scholar who considers Wedgwood's work on it "ordinarily quite excellent" doubts Canetti reviewed it in detail. He suspects she hesitated to present discussions of misogyny and antisemitism quite openly. (Note: Canetti tells how she sought him out after reading the novel in German. "She was very quick on the uptake, remembered everything, reacted sharply ... someone with whom you could never be bored. But she was never confidant of her effect on others, and always had the feeling of not being taken seriously." He noted as well Wedgwood's interest in Frieda Benedikt, his lovestruck admirer who published in English as Anna Sebastian.)

Her book The Last of the Radicals (1951), was about her uncle Josiah Wedgwood, 1st Baron Wedgwood. She completed just one volume of her planned Short History of the World (1985) before illness prevented her from continuing the project.

Her essays, many later published in small collections, appeared originally in Lady Rhondda's Time and Tide where she held editor posts from 1944 to 1952, and in the Times Literary Supplement, The Spectator, and other periodicals. Garrett Mattingly praised the essays in Truth and Opinion (1960) for "displaying (or concealing, rather, but always molded and controlled by) that exquisite sense of form, in a medium apparently almost formless, which is the first-rate essayist's most precious gift."

== Personal life ==
She was active in numerous societies, including the London arm of the International Pen Club in London, where she was president from 1951 to 1957, as well as the Society of Authors (president, 1972–1977) and the London Library. She was appointed as the non-legal member on the Judicial Committee advising Home Secretary on deprivation of citizenship in 1948. She served on the Arts Council from 1958 to 1961 and the Advisory Council of the Victoria and Albert Museum from 1960 to 1969, and was twice a trustee of the National Gallery (1962–1968 and 1969–1976), and its first female trustee. She was a member of the Royal Commission on Historical Manuscripts from 1953 to 1978 and president of the English Association for 1955–56. She was elected a Fellow of the British Academy in 1975.

In 1947 she attended the first meeting of the Mont Pelerin Society. In 1966 she was one of 49 writers who signed a letter appealing to the Soviet Union for the release of Andrei Sinyavsky and Yuli Daniel from imprisonment based on the "literary and artistic merits" of their work and rejecting the characterisation of it as "propaganda". In her later years she was an admirer of Margaret Thatcher.

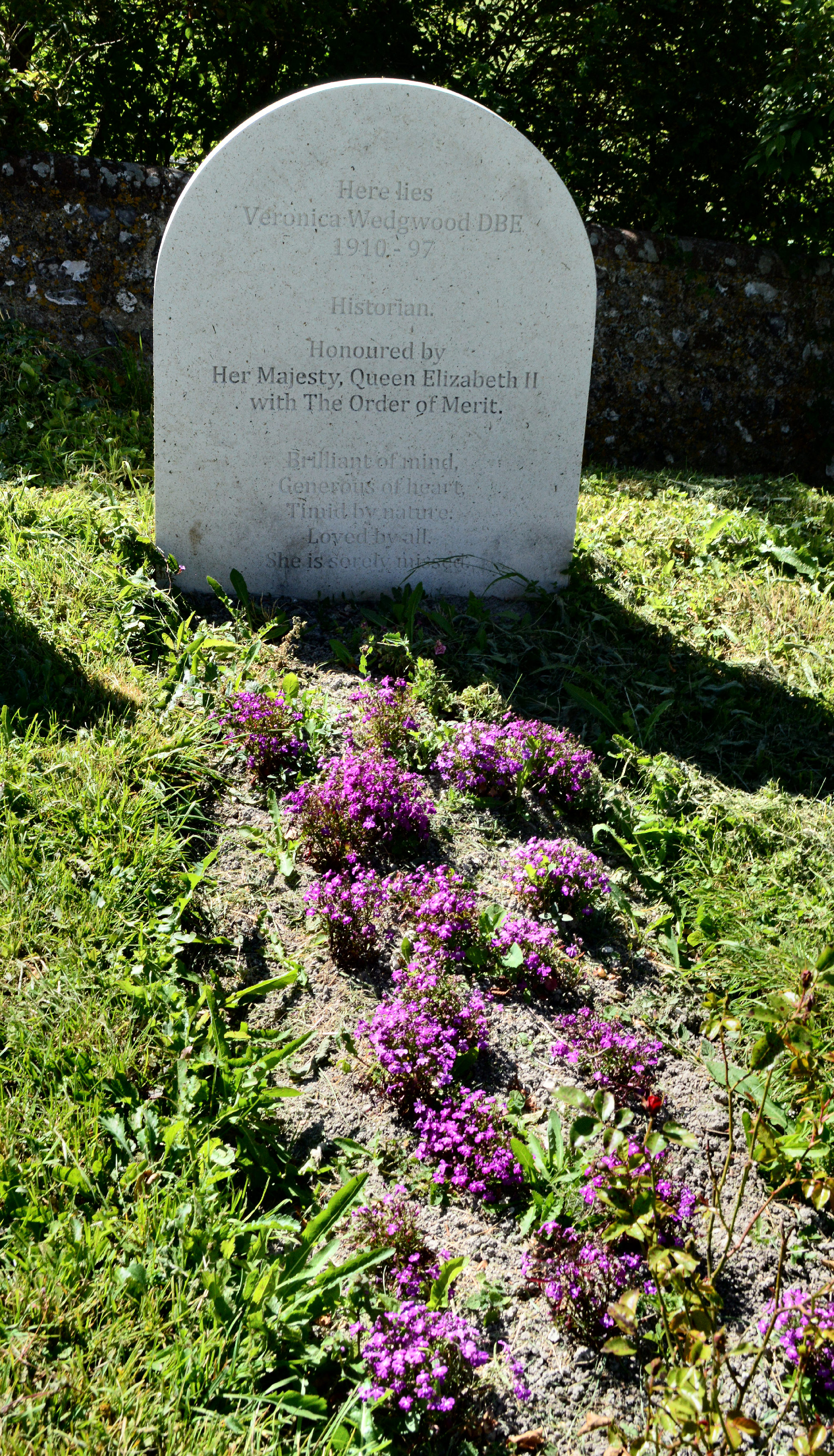
Wedgwood's grave at Alciston Church in East Sussex

Wedgwood was a lesbian: her partner of almost seventy years, Jacqueline Hope-Wallace (died 2011), was a fellow graduate of Lady Margaret Hall and had a significant career in the British civil service. (Note: Hope-Wallace was appointed a CBE in the 1958 New Year Honours, identified as "Assistant Secretary, National Assistance Board". Hope-Wallace was born Dorothy Jacqueline Hope-Wallace on 29 May 1909. She graduated BA from Lady Margaret Hall in 1931. She worked in the Ministry of Labour and then with the National Assistance Board. She was an Under-Secretary at the Ministry of Labour from 1958 to 1965, and an Under-Secretary at the Ministry of Housing and Local Government from 1965 to 1969. She was Commissioner of the Public Works Loan Board from 1974 to 1978. In a profile of Hope-Wallace in Civil Service Network just after she turned 100, she said: "My brother Philip was a journalist: the Guardian's man on music and plays. And for nearly 70 years I shared a life with a well-known historian called Dame Veronica Wedgwood, in Sussex and London. So that was the entourage that I lived in socially ...") Wedgwood and Hope-Wallace together owned a country house near Polegate in Sussex. Both came from musical families. Wedgwood's father was a cousin of Ralph Vaughan Williams, who dedicated his London Symphony to him. Hope-Wallace's brother Philip was for various periods music and drama critic of The Times, Time and Tide, and the Manchester Guardian. She edited a collection of his writings as Words and Music (1981) for which Wedgwood wrote the introduction. In 1997, Hope-Wallace donated a 1944 oil portrait of Wedgwood by Sir Lawrence Gowing to the National Portrait Gallery, London.

In her last years, Wedgwood suffered from Alzheimer's disease. She died on 9 March 1997 at St Thomas' Hospital in London.

== Honours ==
Her biography William the Silent was awarded the 1944 James Tait Black Memorial Prize. The Netherlands awarded her the Order of Orange-Nassau.

She received honorary degrees from the universities of Glasgow and Sheffield and from Smith College, and was a member of the Institute for Advanced Study in Princeton from 1952 to 1966. She was elected an honorary fellow of her Oxford college, Lady Margaret Hall. In the United States she was elected a member of the Academy of Arts and Letters (1966), a Foreign Honorary Member of the American Academy of Arts and Sciences (1973), and the American Philosophical Society. She received the Goethe Medal in 1958.

She was appointed a CBE in 1956, an DBE in 1968, and in 1969, not yet sixty, became the third woman to be appointed a member of the Order of Merit. (Note: The women who preceded her in the Order of Merit were Florence Nightingale and Dorothy Hodgkin.) She termed the last of these honours "excessive".

== Writings ==
- Strafford, 1593–1641 (1935; revised edition: Thomas Wentworth, First Earl of Strafford, 1593–1641: A Revaluation (1961))
- The Thirty Years War (1938; new edition 1957; with updated bibliography, 1961)
- Oliver Cromwell (1939; revised 1973)
- William the Silent: William of Nassau, Prince of Orange, 1533–1584. New Haven, Connecticut: Yale University Press, 1944
- Velvet Studies (1946), a collection of essays
- Richelieu and the French Monarchy (1949), "Teach Yourself History" series
- Seventeenth-Century English Literature (1950; 2nd edition 1970)
- The Last of the Radicals: Josiah Wedgwood, M.P. (1951)
- The Great Rebellion (two of three volumes completed)
  - The King's Peace, 1637–1641 (1955)
  - The King's War, 1641–1647 (1958)
- The Trial of Charles I (1964; also published as A Coffin for King Charles and later as A King Condemned: The Trial and Execution of Charles I (London, Taurus Parke Paperbacks: 2011))
- Poetry and Politics Under the Stuarts (1960), originally Cambridge lectures
- Truth and Opinion (1960), a collection of essays
- "Introduction" to Rose Macaulay, They Were Defeated (London: Collins, 1960); reprint of 1932 edition of the historical novel
- Montrose (1966)
- The Sense of the Past: Thirteen Studies in the Theory and Practice of History (Collier Books, 1967)
- The World of Rubens (Time-Life Books, 1973)
- The Spoils of Time: A Short History of the World, Vol. 1: A World History From the Dawn of Civilization Through the Early Renaissance (1985)
- History and Hope: The Collected Essays of C.V. Wedgwood (1987); "Most of these essays were originally published in two collections—Velvet studies in 1946 and Truth and opinion in 1960—although the present volume contains a few later pieces"

Translations

- Carl Brandi, The Emperor Charles V: The Growth and Destiny of a Man and of a World-Empire (In German Brandi, Karl. 1937. Kaiser Karl V: Werden und Schicksal einer Persönlichkeit und eines Weltreiches. München: Bruckmann)
- Canetti, Elias, Auto-da-Fé (British ed., 1946); The Tower of Babel (American ed., 1947); original in German: Die Blendung
