= Piers Wedgwood, 4th Baron Wedgwood =

British baron (1954–2014)

The Right Honourable The Lord Wedgwood
- Piers Wedgwood, 4th Baron Wedgwood.
- Born: Piers Anthony Weymouth Wedgwood; 20 September 1954
- Died: 29 January 2014 (aged 59); West Philadelphia, Pennsylvania
- Occupations: Military officer, nobleman
- Spouse: Mary Regina Margaret Kavanagh Quinn (m. 1985)
- Children: 1
- Parent(s): Hugh Wedgwood, 3rd Baron Wedgwood; Jane Poulton

Piers Anthony Weymouth Wedgwood, 4th Baron Wedgwood (20 September 1954 – 29 January 2014) was the fourth Baron Wedgwood of the pottery dynasty. After initially following a military career, he later worked as an international ambassador for the Wedgwood company.

== Biography ==
He was the son of Hugh Wedgwood, later 3rd Baron Wedgwood, and his wife Jane Weymouth (née Poulton), daughter of W. J. Poulton, of Kenjockety, Molo, Kenya. He was a descendant of the potter Josiah Wedgwood. He was educated at Marlborough College. Upon the early death of his father, from a heart attack aged 45 in 1970, Wedgwood succeeded to the title of Baron Wedgwood as the fourth Baron, aged only 15.

After military training at the Royal Military Academy Sandhurst, he was commissioned as a Second Lieutenant in the Royal Scots in 1973 (personal no. 496342), was promoted to Lieutenant in 1975 and Captain in 1980, resigning his commission shortly thereafter. He received the General Service Medal for Northern Ireland in 1976.

In 1985 he married Mary Regina Margaret Kavanagh Quinn, daughter of Judge Edward Thomas Quinn and of Helen Marie Buchanan Quinn of Philadelphia. They have one daughter, The Hon. Alexandra Mary Kavanagh Wedgwood, known as Sandra, (born 3 October 1987).

Wedgwood was an active member of the House of Lords, with special interest in defence and heritage. In 1999, the House of Lords Bill proposed to remove the right of hereditary peers to sit in the House of Lords. Wedgwood spoke out against the Bill, and when it passed he was not elected as one of the 92 hereditary peers who remained. Wedgwood therefore left the House of Lords in November 1999. He became a Freeman of the City of London in 2006.

Wedgwood died of cardiac failure, at the Hospital of the University of Pennsylvania in West Philadelphia, Pennsylvania on 29 January 2014.

Until 2007, the heir presumptive to the Barony was Wedgwood's uncle John Wedgwood. After John Wedgwood's death the heir presumptive became John Wedgwood's son, the 4th Baron's cousin, Antony Wedgwood, who succeeded to the Barony as the 5th Baron.

== Arms ==
Coat of arms of Piers Wedgwood, 4th Baron Wedgwood
Crest Upon a ducal coronet a lion passant Argent. Escutcheon Gules four mullets in cross; a canton Argent. Supporters On either side a lion double-queued Argent supporting a staff raguly Gules. Motto Obstantia Discindo

Peerage of the United Kingdom
Preceded by Hugh Everard Wedgwood	Baron Wedgwood; 1970–2014	Succeeded by Antony John Wedgwood
