= Wedgwood baronets =

Baronetcy in the Baronetage of the United Kingdom

The Wedgwood Baronetcy, of Etruria in the County of Stafford, is a title in the Baronetage of the United Kingdom. It was created in 1942 for Ralph Wedgwood, chairman of the World War II Railway Executive Committee. He was the great-great-grandson of the potter Josiah Wedgwood and the younger brother of Josiah Wedgwood, 1st Baron Wedgwood.

== Wedgwood baronets, of Etruria (1942) ==
Escutcheon of the Wedgwood baronets of Etruria

- Sir Ralph Lewis Wedgwood, 1st Baronet (1874–1956)
- Sir John Hamilton Wedgwood, 2nd Baronet (1907–1989)
- Sir (Hugo) Martin Wedgwood, 3rd Baronet (1933–2010)
- Sir Ralph Nicholas Wedgwood, 4th Baronet (born 1964)

The heir presumptive is the present holder's uncle John Julian Wedgwood (born 1937).
The heir presumptive's heir apparent is his son (John) Adam Wedgwood (born 1962).

== See also ==
- Baron Wedgwood
