= Margaret Belcher =

New Zealand literary scholar

The Collected Letters of A.W.N. Pugin; Volume 1: 1830-1842. Oxford University Press, 2001.

Margaret Belcher (18 September 1936 – 29 November 2016) was a New Zealand literary scholar who was a specialist in the literary output of Augustus Pugin, whose letters she edited in five volumes.

== Early life ==
Margaret Belcher was born on 18 September 1936 in Christchurch, New Zealand, the second daughter of Nelson and Lesley Belcher. She had a brother John and a sister Pam. She was educated at Rangi Ruru Girls' School, a private academy in Christchurch, and then at Canterbury University College, a constituent college of the University of New Zealand, where she obtained an MA in English. She won a scholarship to study at St Hugh's College, Oxford from 1958 to 1960 before returning to what had become in her absence the University of Canterbury where she completed her doctorate. The title of her doctoral thesis was A study of Contrasts and other writings of A.W.N. Pugin in relation to the mediaevalist tradition in Victorian literature : together with a bibliography of publications by and about him.

== Career ==
Belcher joined the staff of the University of Canterbury in 1962, eventually becoming senior lecturer in the English department. She was a specialist in the literary output of Augustus Pugin. In 1982, she published an article on Pugin in Southern Review and in 1987, while working in London on leave from Canterbury, she produced an annotated critical bibliography of works by or about Pugin, the first of its kind. She began to edit his letters in 1987, a work that eventually ran to five volumes from 2001 to 2015. In 1994, she contributed a chapter "Pugin Writing" to Pugin: A Gothic Passion, produced by the Victoria & Albert Museum for their Pugin exhibition that year. The piece brought her to the attention of British Pugin enthusiasts who formed The Pugin Society in 1995. Belcher often supplied articles for the society's journal, True Principles.

== Death ==
Belcher died on 29 November 2016. She was unmarried and was survived by her brother and sister.

== Selected publications ==
- A History of Rangi-Ruru School. Rangi-Ruru Presbyterian Girls' School, New Zealand, 1964.
- A.W.N. Pugin: an annotated critical bibliography. Mansell, London and New York, 1987.
- The Collected Letters of A.W.N. Pugin; Volume 1: 1830-1842. Oxford University Press, Oxford, 2001.
- The Collected Letters of A.W.N. Pugin; Volume 2: 1843-1845. Oxford University Press, Oxford, 2003.
- The Collected Letters of A.W.N. Pugin; Volume 3: 1846-1848. Oxford University Press, Oxford, 2009.
- The Collected Letters of A.W.N. Pugin; Volume 4: 1849-1850. Oxford University Press, Oxford, 2012.
- The Collected Letters of A.W.N. Pugin; Volume 5: 1851-1852. Oxford University Press, Oxford, 2015. ISBN 9780198713913

== See also ==
- Alexandra Wedgwood
