= Isabella I (disambiguation) =

Isabella I (1451–1504; r. 1474–1504) was Queen of Castile.

Isabella I may also refer to:

- Isabella I of Jerusalem (c. 1172 – 1205; r. 1190/1192 – 1205), Queen of Jerusalem
- Isabella I of Majorca (1337–1406), Queen of Majorca in pretense

== See also ==
- Elizabeth I (disambiguation)
- Isabella II (disambiguation)
- Isabella of Castile (disambiguation)
- Queen Isabella (disambiguation)
