= Elizabeth I (disambiguation) =

Elizabeth I (1533–1603; r. 1558–1603) was Queen of England and Ireland.

Elizabeth I or 1 may also refer to:

- Elizabeth I (2005 TV series)
- Elizabeth I (2017 TV series)
- Elizabeth I of Russia (1709–1762; r. 1741–1762), Empress of Russia

== See also ==
- Elizabeth II (disambiguation)
  - Elizabeth II (1926–2022; r. 1952–2022), controversially called Elizabeth I in Scotland
    - Pillar Box War, part of the Scottish dispute over Elizabeth II's regnal number
- Elizabeth of England (disambiguation)
- Elizabeth Tudor (disambiguation)
- Isabella I (disambiguation), the Spanish equivalent of Elizabeth I
- QE1 (disambiguation)
- Queen Elizabeth (disambiguation)
- Queenie (Blackadder), a caricature of Elizabeth I in Blackadder II
