= Lil Tudor-Craig =

Elizabeth J. "Lil" Tudor-Craig (born 1960), is a British conservationist, environmental artist, and literary illustrator from Suffolk. She is known for her murals and watercolour paintings, specialising in finely detailed impressionist work, presenting a wide-ranging knowledge of wild botanical species and the insects and birds they support through the cycle of life. She has held one-person exhibitions in Aldeburgh (1986), Aldgate, London (1987); Lewes (2001, 2010), and Suffolk (2010).

In addition to her fine art and conservation interests, Tudor-Craig served as illustrator of The Flora: An Anthology of Poetry and Prose, along with compiler, Fiona MacMath.

== Personal background ==
Tudor-Craig was born in Suffolk in 1960. She is the only daughter of James Tudor-Craig, son of Sir Algernon Tudor-Craig. Her mother is the mediaeval art historian Pamela, Lady Wedgwood, (née Wynne-Reeves). When Tudor-Craig's father died in 1969, the family moved from Suffolk to London, where her mother remained unmarried for the next 13 years. In 1982, she married Sir John Wedgwood, 2nd Baronet, of the Wedgwood pottery family, but was again widowed in 1989.

Tudor-Craig was raised with an appreciation for fine art and literature. While her father had a distinguished career as a museum curator, her mother was the art historian, Pamela, Lady Wedgwood, curator of the Richard III exhibition at the National Portrait Gallery in 1973.

Counted among Tudor-Craig's childhood friends, were British sculptor and master stonecarver Simon Verity, along with the English architect, landscape architect, and garden designer, Oliver Hill. During her childhood, Tudor-Craig began to develop environmental interests and concern for sustainable, humane and wildlife-friendly farming methods. When she was 11 years old, she joined the Soil Association and the National Society for the Abolition of Factory Farming. In continuing pursuit of her conservation interests, she left school when she was 17 years old and began working on local family farms. In 1979, she earned a National Certificate in Agriculture.

== Professional background ==
In 1981, Tudor-Craig was taught briefly by Cecil Collins, who encouraged her to foster her talent and consider pursuing a career in fine art, specifically, painting, drawing, and printmaking, using her background and expertise in environmental, botanical, and wildlife studies. She wouldn't pursue these interests in a full-time capacity for almost 20 years.

=== Environmental conservation ===
In 1984, she moved back to Suffolk and began training in river navigation. In 1990, she gained the Advanced National Certificate in Wildlife Conservation, specialising in biological surveying and for three years, taught wild plant identification. At this time, she also worked on the National Rivers Authority, River Corridor, and Coastal Plant surveys in Suffolk and Essex.

=== Fine art background ===
Trained formally in farming and wildlife conservation, Tudor-Craig has been committed to painting since the early 1980s.

While Tudor-Craig held one-person exhibitions in Aldeburgh in 1986, along with Aldgate and London the following year, it wasn't until 2000, that she began to work exclusively on her paintings. She specialises in the use of egg tempera, pure pigment combined with water and egg yolk. Under these conditions, the paint can only be prepared in small quantities, due to quick drying. This paint is then applied over gesso on birch-plywood panels. While this process can take up to four months to complete, the technique allows for intense colours and finely detailed work, enhancing the artist's impressionistic style.

Tudor-Craig's principal body of work is enhanced through her environmental background in agriculture and wildlife conservation. Outside of occasional commissions for murals and watercolour paintings, her work focuses on presenting native species of wild plants and the creatures they support.

"Many insects depend on a single plant species. Without the caterpillar's food plant, there will be no butterflies. Brambles and stinging nettles especially support large numbers of butterflies and other creatures, some of which live only on these plants. In my paintings, I seek to represent these relationships, this inter-connectedness."

—Lil Tudor-Craig

=== Featured works ===
- 2004 – "Nettle Bed" 18" x 24" (45.5 x 61 cm)
- 2005 – "Meadow at Butley" 18" x 24" (45.5 x 61 cm)
- 2007 – "Rose & Honeysuckle" 18" x 24" (45.5 x 61 cm)
- 2007 – "Sea Wormwood" 18" x 24" (45.5 x 61 cm)
- 2008 – "Ribwort Plantain" 18" x 24" (45.5 x 61 cm)
- 2008 – "Hawthorn" 18" x 24" (45.5 x 61 cm)

=== Exhibitions ===
- 1986 – Aldeburgh
- 1987 – Aldgate, London
- 2001 – Lewes
- 2008 – London, Francis Kyle Gallery
- 2010 – Lewes, Linklater Pavilion, "Ecology into Art"
- 2010 – Suffolk, Golden Road, "Reflected Glories"

== Published works ==
- Macmath, Fiona (compiler); Lil Tudor-Craig (illustrator). The Flora: An Anthology of Poetry and Prose, Chariot Victor Publications, (October 1990). ISBN 978-0-7459-1840-2
