= Martin Wedgwood =

British stockbroker and linguist (1933–2010)

Sir Martin Wedgwood
- Born: Hugo Martin Wedgwood; 27 December 1933
- Died: 12 October 2010 (aged 76)
- Education: Eton College, Trinity College, Oxford, Oxford University
- Occupations: Stockbroker and linguist

Sir Hugo Martin Wedgwood, 3rd Baronet, (27 December 1933 – 12 October 2010) was a British stockbroker and linguist.

== Biography ==
Wedgwood was the eldest son of Sir John Wedgwood, 2nd Baronet. He was a great-great-great-great-grandson of the master potter Josiah Wedgwood. Sir Martin was educated at Eton and Trinity College, Oxford. Over the course of his life, Wedgwood mastered 20 languages.

He worked in the family pottery firm in the UK and Canada. In 1973 he joined the Stock Exchange, remaining there until retirement.

In 1963 he married the architectural historian Alexandra Gordon Clark (known as Sandra), daughter of the judge and crime novelist, Alfred Gordon Clark. They had one son, Ralph (born 1964) and two daughters, Julia, and Frances, a doctor married to the television producer Gareth Edwards.

He inherited the Wedgwood Baronetcy and title on the death of his father on 9 December 1989. On his own death in October 2010 the Baronetcy passed to his son, the 4th Baronet, Professor Sir Ralph Nicholas Wedgwood, Fellow of Merton College, Oxford, now Professor of Philosophy at the University of Southern California.

He lived for many years at Pixham Mill, Dorking, and is buried at Mickleham in Surrey.

Baronetage of the United Kingdom
| Preceded by John Hamilton Wedgwood | Baronet (of Etruria); 1989–2010 | Succeeded by Ralph Nicholas Wedgwood |
