= Hugh Wedgwood, 3rd Baron Wedgwood =

The Right Honourable The Lord Wedgwood
- Born: Hugh Everard Wedgwood; 20 April 1921
- Died: 25 April 1970 (aged 49)
- Spouse: Jane Weymouth Poulto
- Parent(s): Francis Wedgwood, 2nd Baron Wedgwood; Edith May Telfer

Hugh Everard Wedgwood, 3rd Baron Wedgwood (20 April 1921 – 25 April 1970) was the third Baron Wedgwood of the pottery dynasty.

== Biography ==
He was the son and only child of The Hon. Francis Wedgwood (later 2nd Baron) and his wife Edith May Telfer, daughter of William Telfer of Glasgow. He was the great-great-great-great-grandson of the potter Josiah Wedgwood. Like his father, he was educated at Bedales School. During the Second World War he served as an officer in the Kenya Regiment. In 1949 he married Jane Weymouth Poulton, daughter of W. J. Poulton of Kenjockety, Molo, Kenya; they had one son, Piers and two daughters. He was a farmer in Hillwood, Molo, Kenya, 1941–1964. Upon his father's death in 1959 he succeeded his father as the 3rd Baron Wedgwood. Upon his own death in 1970, the Barony passed to his son Piers.

Peerage of the United Kingdom
Preceded by Francis Wedgwood	Baron Wedgwood; 1959–1970	Succeeded by Piers Wedgwood
