= Baron Wedgwood =

Barony in the Peerage of the United Kingdom

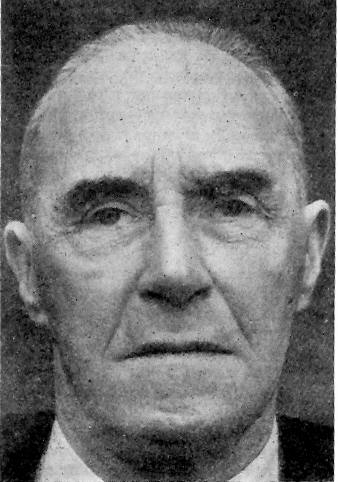
1st Baron Wedgwood

Baron Wedgwood, of Barlaston in the County of Stafford, is a title in the Peerage of the United Kingdom. It was created in 1942 for the soldier and politician Josiah Wedgwood. He was the great-great-grandson of Josiah Wedgwood, the founder of the Wedgwood pottery dynasty. As of 2023, the title is held by the first Baron's great-grandson, the fifth Baron, who succeeded his cousin in 2014.

Ralph Wedgwood, younger brother of the first Baron, was created a baronet, in 1942.

== Barons Wedgwood (1942) ==
- Josiah Clement Wedgwood, 1st Baron Wedgwood (1872–1943)
- Francis Charles Bowen Wedgwood, 2nd Baron Wedgwood (1898–1959)
- Hugh Everard Wedgwood, 3rd Baron Wedgwood (1921–1970)
- Piers Anthony Weymouth Wedgwood, 4th Baron Wedgwood (1954–2014)
- Antony John Wedgwood, 5th Baron Wedgwood (b. 1944)

The heir apparent is the present holder's son, Hon. Josiah Thomas Antony Wedgwood (b. 1978)
The heir apparent's heir apparent is his son, Felix Wedgwood (b.2020)

== Coat of arms ==
Coat of arms of Baron Wedgwood
Crest Upon a ducal coronet a lion passant Argent. Escutcheon Gules four mullets in cross; a canton Argent. Supporters On either side a lion double-queued Argent supporting a staff raguly Gules. Motto Obstantia Discindo

== See also ==
- Wedgwood baronets
