= Ted Tudor =

English footballer

Personal information
- Full name: Thomas Edward Tudor
- Date of birth: 15 March 1935 (age 91)
- Place of birth: Neston, England
- Position: Inside left

Youth career
- 1957–1958: Bolton Wanderers

Senior career*
Years	Team	Apps	(Gls)
1958–1959	Gillingham	1	(0)
- * Club domestic league appearances and goals

Thomas Edward Tudor (born 15 March 1935) is an English former professional footballer who played for Gillingham as an inside left.
