= Pamela Tudor-Craig =

British medieval art historian

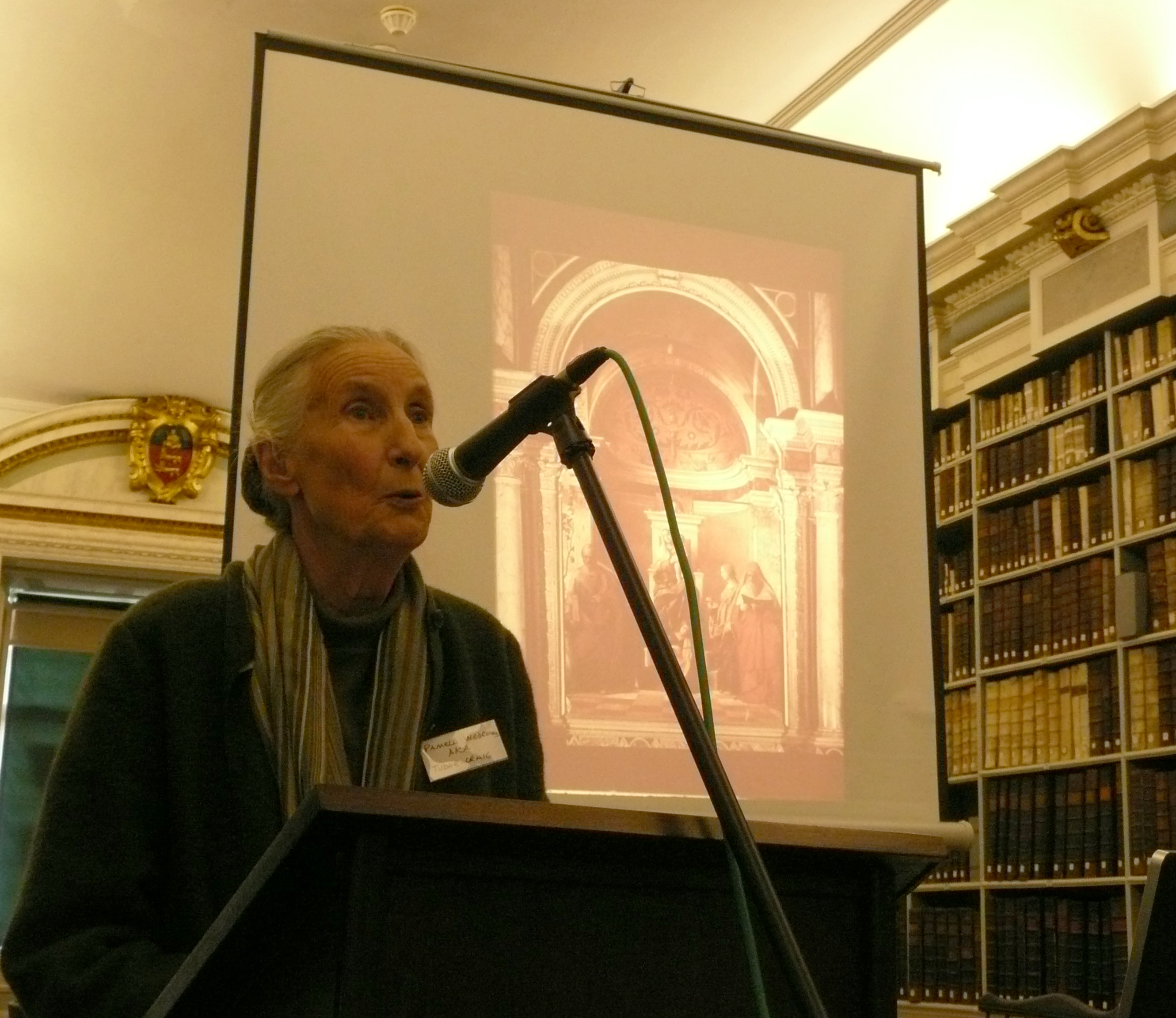
Pamela Tudor-Craig

Dr Pamela Tudor-Craig, Lady Wedgwood FSA (née Wynn-Reeves; 26 June 1928 – 5 December 2017) was a British medieval art historian.

== Personal life ==
Pamela Wynn-Reeves was born on 26 June 1928 in Golders Green, London. Her parents were Herbert Wynn-Reeves, a conductor, and Madeline Marion Wynn-Reeves, née Brows. She was home schooled until the age of 11 and then attended a convent school.

She married James Tudor-Craig, son of Sir Algernon Tudor-Craig in 1956; they had one daughter, the artist Lil Tudor-Craig.

Pamela Tudor-Craig was widowed in 1969 and in 1982 she married Sir John Wedgwood, Bt., of the Wedgwood pottery family. They lived in Little Gidding, Cambridgeshire. She was widowed for a second time in 1989 and moved to Lewes, East Sussex.

She died on 5 December 2017 from pulmonary fibrosis, aged 89.

== Career ==
=== Academic career ===
Tudor-Craig was educated at the Courtauld Institute of Art, gaining a BA in 1949 and a PhD in 1952. Her PhD was on English stiff-leaf sculpture.

She was elected a Fellow of the Society of Antiquaries in 1958 and served on its council between 1989 and 1992. She was determined to catalogue their entire collection of paintings, a task that took nearly six decades, helped by Bernard Nurse, Jill Franklin and other fellows. In 2015, she was awarded the Society of Antiquaries medal for outstanding service.

In the 1980s, Tudor-Craig taught at Harlaxton College in Lincolnshire, and founded the annual Harlaxton Medieval Symposium in 1984. She also taught at the United States International University (USIU) in London which had locations at Dropmore Park, Berkshire and later at Ashdown Park in East Sussex. While teaching at USIU she arranged private tours for the students of many great buildings including Blenheim Palace and St Paul's Cathedral in London.

William Jewell College awarded her an honorary doctorate in 1983.

She was the curator of the exhibition Richard III at the National Portrait Gallery in 1973. She believed that the accepted image of Richard III as a villain was as a result of Tudor efforts to rebrand him, and showed that some of his portraits had been altered by 'Tudor propaganda'. Roy Strong, the gallery's director at the time, said that the exhibition was "the event of the year".

=== Television career ===
Outside of academia she is best known for her contribution to the 1986 TV series The Secret Life of Paintings and the accompanying book of the same name, co-authored with Richard Foster.

Tudor-Craig also participated in the BBC's 1976 series Second Verdict and ITV's 1984 production The Trial of Richard III.

=== Church conservation work ===
She was a committed Christian and worked for the conservation and upkeep of churches. She sat on cathedral committees, including Wells; and was chair of the Sussex Historic Churches Trust from 2002 to 2010, following which she was elected Honorary President and Life Fellow.

=== Photography ===
Photographs by Tudor-Craig are held in the Conway Library at the Courtauld Institute of Art and are currently being digitised.

== Bibliography ==
Tudor-Craig, P., 1956. Medieval Paintings from Norwich. Victoria and Albert Museum.

Tudor-Craig, P.,1973. Richard III. National Portrait Gallery.

Tudor-Craig, P., 1976. One Half of Our Noblest Art: Study of the Sculptures of Wells West Front. Friends of Wells Cathedral.

Tudor-Craig, P., Beard, G., Girouard, M., Wainwright, C., 1984. Harlaxton Manor. Harlaxton College and Jarrold Colour Publications.

Tudor- Craig, P., Foster, R., 1986. The Secret Life of Paintings. Boydell Press.

Tudor-Craig, P., Wilson, J.P., Gem, C.R., 1986. Westminster Abbey. Bell and Hyman.

Tudor-Craig, P., Ollard, R. L., Wedgwood, C.V., 1986. For Veronica Wedgwood These: Studies in Seventeenth-century History. HarperCollins.

Tudor-Craig, P., Hunting, P., 2004. Old St Paul’s: The Society of Antiquaries’ Diptych, 1616. London Topographical Society.

Tudor-Craig, P., Franklin, J.A., Nurse, B., 2015. Catalogue of Paintings in the Collection of the Society of Antiquaries of London. Harvey Miller Publishers.
