= J. T. Wedgwood =

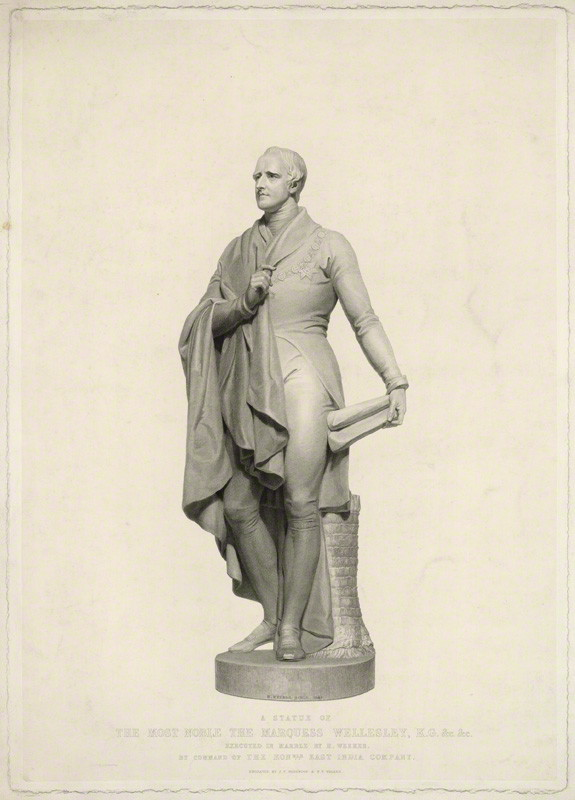
Portrait of Richard Wellesley, 1st Marquess Wellesley, by J. T. Wedgwood and by F. F. Walker, printed by S. H. Hawkins 'after a sculpture by Henry Weekes'

John Taylor Wedgwood (christened 19 October 1782- 6 March 1856) was an English line engraver.

== Biography ==
He was the son of the potter Thomas Wedgwood II (1734–1788) and his wife Elizabeth Taylor. His elder brother was of Ralph Wedgwood, who was a pioneer of photography, and they both were cousins of Josiah Wedgwood, the industrial potter.

He worked for many years in Paris. His work focused on adapting existing paintings, mostly portraits, for printing. He used the burin technique for engraving.

Wedgwood covered original works by artists such as Samuel Cooper, William Johnstone White, John Thurston, Henry Weekes, Mary Beale, Titian Sir Joshua Reynolds, Thomas Gainsborough, Eugène Devéria, Salvator Rosa, Antonio Correggio, Henry Perronet Briggs, Sir George Hayter, Lemuel Francis Abbott, John Singleton Copley, William Behnes, Miss Carmichael, Achille Devéria, Louis Boulanger, Robert Blemmell Schnebbelie, Henry Corbould, Louis Boulanger, George Shepherd, George Robert Lewis, Sir Francis Legatt Chantrey, Antoine François Callet/Joseph Siffred Duplessis, William Dobson, Francis Parsons, Sir Peter Lely, Willem van de Passe, Henry Perronet Briggs,

He died in Clapham on 6 March 1856. He never married.
