= Josiah Wedgwood V =

- Born: October 20, 1899
- Died: May 18, 1968 (aged 68)
- Spouse: Dorothy Mary Haskins
- Children: 3, including John Wedgwood
- Parent(s): Josiah Wedgwood IV; Ethel Kate Bowen

Josiah Wedgwood V (20 October 1899 – 18 May 1968) was the Managing Director of the Wedgwood pottery firm from 1930 until 1968 and credited with a transformation in the company's fortunes.

== Family ==
Wedgwood was one of seven children of Josiah Wedgwood IV (later Lord Wedgwood) and The Hon. Ethel Kate Bowen, daughter of Sir Charles Bowen, 1st Baron Bowen. He was the great-great-great-grandson of the potter Josiah Wedgwood. His sister was the anthropologist Camilla Wedgwood.

He married Dorothy Mary Haskins née Winser in 1919 in Holborn and they had three children:

- Dr John Wedgwood (1919–2007), CBE, MD, FRCP
- Josiah Wedgwood VI, a.k.a. Ralph J.P. Wedgwood, MD (1924–2017)
- Jennifer Wedgwood (1927–1992)

He succeeded his uncle Francis Hamilton Wedgwood as managing director on his uncle's death in 1930. Wedgwood modernised production and reinvigorated Wedgwood designs by the employment of artists such as John Skeaping, Keith Murray, Arnold Machin and Eric Ravilious. After his retirement in 1961, Arthur Bryan (later Sir) became managing director.
