= Sir Ralph Wedgwood, 4th Baronet =

British philosopher (born 1964)

Sir Ralph Wedgwood Bt
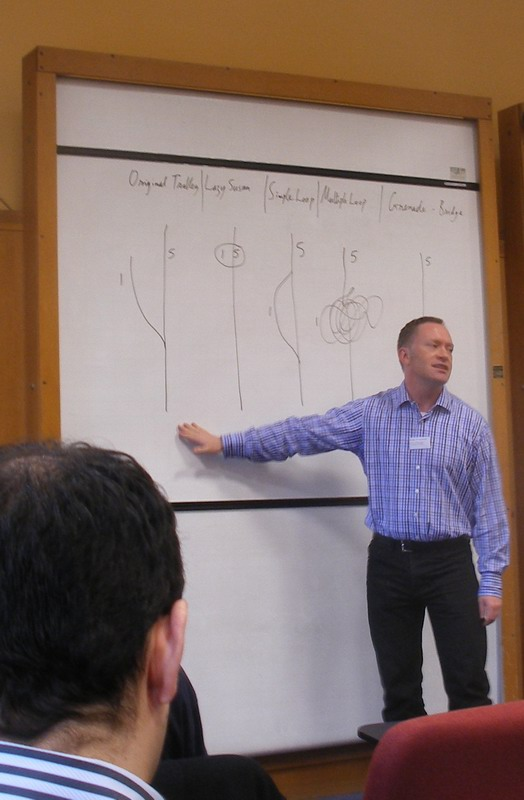
- Sir Ralph in 2008
- Born: 10 December 1964 (age 61); Vancouver, British Columbia, Canada
- Education: Westminster School
- Alma mater: Magdalen College, Oxford; King's College London; Cornell University
- Occupation: Philosopher

Sir Ralph Nicholas Wedgwood, 4th Baronet (/reɪf/ RAYF, rhyming with "safe" or "waif"; born 10 December 1964) is a British philosopher who is a professor of philosophy at the University of Southern California.

== Life and career ==
Wedgwood was born in Vancouver, British Columbia, the only son of the architectural historian Alexandra (known as Sandra; née Gordon Clark; daughter of the judge and crime novelist, Alfred Gordon Clark) and her husband Martin Wedgwood, later 3rd Baronet. He was named after his great-grandfather, Sir Ralph Wedgwood, 1st Baronet. Wedgwood is a descendant of the master potter Josiah Wedgwood. He inherited the Wedgwood Baronetcy of Etruria upon the death of his father on 12 October 2010. The heir presumptive to the baronetcy is John Julian Wedgwood (born 1936), son of the 2nd Baronet.

Wedgwood was educated at Westminster School, before entering Magdalen College, Oxford and taking a BA in classics and modern languages, followed by studies at King's College London (MPhil), and Cornell University, New York (PhD). He was assistant professor of philosophy at the Massachusetts Institute of Technology in 1995, becoming associate professor in 1999. From 2002, Wedgwood was lecturer and fellow in philosophy at Merton College, Oxford, and became full professor in 2007. At the beginning of 2012 he moved to the University of Southern California in Los Angeles as professor of philosophy.

== Philosophical work ==
Wedgwood works primarily on topics in ethics (including meta-ethics, practical reason, normative ethics, and the history of ethics) and epistemology. He is the author of The Nature of Normativity (Oxford: Clarendon Press, 2007), and numerous papers on philosophy and ethics, including the oft-cited paper The Fundamental Argument for Same-Sex Marriage, which argues for the legitimacy of same-sex marriage. He has also written a piece on the same subject for the New York Times.

Baronetage of the United Kingdom
Preceded by Martin Wedgwood	Baronet (of Etruria); 2010-present	Incumbent
