= Alexandra Wedgwood =

English architectural historian (1938–2025)

- Born: Alexandra Mary Gordon Clark; 30 July 1938
- Died: 17 December 2025 (aged 87)
- Occupation: Architectural historian
- Spouse: Martin Wedgwood
- Parent(s): Alfred Alexander Gordon Clark; Mary Barbara Lawrence

Alexandra Mary, Lady Wedgwood, FSA (née Gordon Clark; 30 July 1938 – 17 December 2025) was an English architectural historian and expert on the work of Augustus Pugin. Also known as Sandra Wedgwood, she was the patron of the Pugin Society and the former architectural archivist of the House of Lords.

== Early life and family ==
Alexandra Mary Gordon Clark was born on 30 July 1938 to the judge and crime writer Alfred Alexander Gordon Clark, who wrote under the pseudonym Cyril Hare, and Mary Barbara Lawrence (the daughter of Sir William Lawrence, 3rd Baronet). She has a brother, the clergyman Charles Philip Gordon Clark, and a sister Cecilia Mary Gordon Clark (a wife of Roderick Snell). She was educated at Guildford High School and received her advanced education at the Courtauld Institute of Art.

In 1963, she married Sir Hugo Martin Wedgwood, 3rd Baronet (1933–2010), the stockbroker and linguist. They had one son, Sir Ralph Wedgwood, 4th Baronet (born 1964) and two daughters, Julia and Frances.

== Career ==
In 1966, Wedgwood was named as joint author with Nikolaus Pevsner of the Warwickshire volume in his The Buildings of England series after Pevsner began to use collaborators to speed the completion of the series. Wedgwood did the initial research for the volume, and then completed significant parts of the work, including the whole of the section on Birmingham.

In January 1980, she was appointed architectural archivist to the House of Lords on the recommendation of Sir Robert Cooke, member of Parliament and adviser to the Secretary of State, who wished to ensure the historically accurate restoration of the Palace of Westminster. Her expertise in the works of Augustus Pugin made her particularly suited to the job and she sought out material worldwide by Pugin, Charles Barry and others related to the Parliamentary estate. She retired in 1998. She revised the Palace of Westminster entry for The Buildings of England volume London 6: Westminster (Yale University Press, 2003).

Wedgwood was elected a fellow of the Society of Antiquaries of London in 1983.

She was also the painting curator at Dorking Museum, and the patron, and former president, of The Pugin Society until her death.

== Death ==
Wedgwood died on 17 December 2025, at the age of 87.

== Selected publications ==
- English Painting, with Michael Kitson, Art of the Western World, Paul Hamlyn, London 1964.
- Warwickshire. Penguin, London, 1966. (The Buildings of England) (With Nikolaus Pevsner)
- Catalogue of the Drawings Collection of the Royal Institute of British Architects: The Pugin Family. Gregg International, London, 1977. ISBN 9780566010019
- Rebuilding the Houses of Parliament: Drawings from the Kennedy albums and the Thomas Greene papers. House of Lords Record Office, London, 1984.
- A.W.N.Pugin and the Pugin Family. V & A Publications, London, 1985. ISBN 978-0948107016
- A History of the Church and Parish of St.Martin's, Dorking. Trustees of the Friends of St Martin's, 1990. (Editor) ISBN 978-0951609705
- Guide to the Speaker's House. HMSO, 1994. ISBN 9789788055013

== See also ==
- Margaret Belcher
