= Algernon Tudor-Craig =

Major Sir Algernon Tudor-Craig KBE FSA (3 January 1873 – 10 April 1943) was a British Army officer, heraldist and author of various works on art history, especially armorial porcelain.

Tudor-Craig was an officer in the 4th (militia) battalion of the Royal Irish Rifles, where he was promoted captain on 27 August 1898, and major on 29 November 1902. He served as Instructor of Musketry with the 8th Provisional Battalion in 1902.

His first wife, whom he married in 1898, was Emily Mary Lukin (1866–1939). Lady Tudor-Craig was made CBE in 1920; they had one son James Tudor-Craig whose wife was Medieval Art Historian, Dr Pamela Tudor-Craig (née Wynn Reeves). In 1940, he remarried Grace Jennings.
