= Elizabeth Tudor (1492–1495) =

English princess (1492–1495)

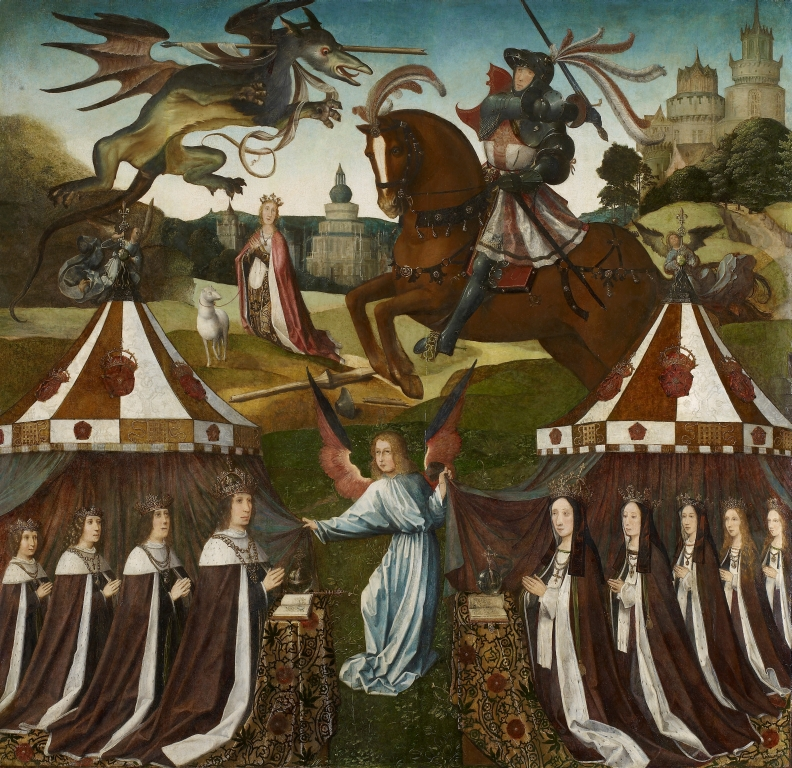
- Born: 2 July 1492; Richmond Palace, Surrey, England
- Died: 14 September 1495 (aged 3); Eltham Palace, Kent, England
- Burial: 27 September 1495; Westminster Abbey
- House: Tudor
- Father: Henry VII of England
- Mother: Elizabeth of York

Elizabeth Tudor (2 July 1492 – 14 September 1495) was the second daughter and fourth child of Henry VII of England and Elizabeth of York.

== Life ==
Elizabeth was born on 2 July 1492 at Sheen Palace in Surrey (later rebuilt by her father as Richmond Palace, the remains of which are now part of Richmond, London). Her wet nurse, Cecily Burbage, was a married gentlewoman from Hayes.

Elizabeth was baptized at Sheen before being transferred to the royal nursery at Eltham Palace in Kent.

== Death ==
Elizabeth died unexpectedly at Eltham Palace on 14 September 1495 at the age of three years, two months, and 12 days. Her parents were travelling between Northampton and Banbury when they received news of her death.

Elizabeth's tomb in Westminster Abbey is made from Purbeck and black marble. On top of the monument is a finely polished slab of black Lydian, upon which were placed inscriptions to Elizabeth and her effigy of copper gilt, both of which have now disappeared with time. The Latin from the inscription can be translated:

Elizabeth, second child of Henry the Seventh King of England, France and Ireland and of the most serene lady Queen Elizabeth his consort, who was born on the second day of the month of July in the year of Our Lord 1492, and died on the 14th day of the month of September in the year of Our Lord 1495, upon whose soul may God have mercy. Amen.

The plate at the feet of her effigy is translated:

Hereafter Death has a royal offspring in this tomb viz. the young and noble Elizabeth daughter of that illustrious prince, Henry the Seventh, who swayed the sceptre of two kingdoms, Atropos, the most severe messenger of Death, snatched her away but may she have eternal life in Heaven.

The following year in 1496, Henry and Elizabeth had another daughter, Mary, who became the Queen of France. Their final two children, Edmund (who died in 1500 at the age of 1) and Katherine (who died in 1503 shortly after birth), were laid to rest by young Elizabeth's side.

== Ancestry ==
Ancestors of Elizabeth Tudor (1492–1495)

8. Owen Tudor
4. Edmund Tudor, 1st Earl of Richmond
9. Catherine of Valois
2. Henry VII of England
10. John Beaufort, 1st Duke of Somerset
5. Margaret Beaufort
11. Margaret Beauchamp
1. Elizabeth Tudor
12. Richard Plantagenet, 3rd Duke of York
6. Edward IV of England
13. Cecily Neville
3. Elizabeth of York
14. Richard Woodville, 1st Earl Rivers
7. Elizabeth Woodville
15. Jacquetta of Luxembourg
