= Edmund Tudor, Duke of Somerset =

English prince (1499–1500)

Edmund Tudor
- Duke of Somerset
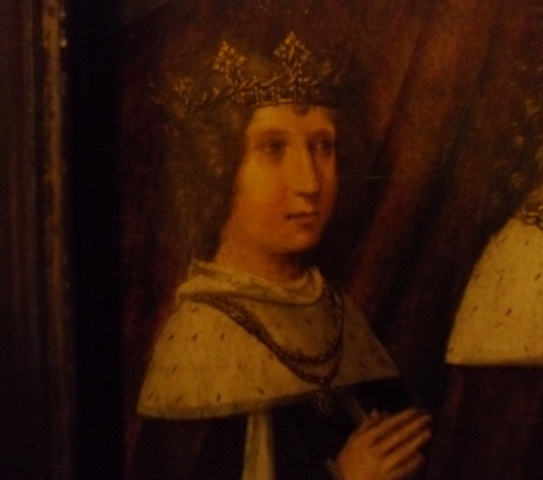
- Detail of a painting showing the family of Henry VII, c. 1509
- Born: 21 February 1499; Greenwich Palace, Kent, England
- Died: 19 June 1500 (aged 1); Hatfield House, Hertfordshire, England
- Burial: 22 June 1500; Westminster Abbey
- House: Tudor
- Father: Henry VII of England
- Mother: Elizabeth of York

Edmund Tudor, Duke of Somerset (21 February 1499 – 19 June 1500) was an English prince, and the sixth child of Henry VII of England and Elizabeth of York.

He was styled from birth Duke of Somerset, but never formally created a peer.

== Early life ==
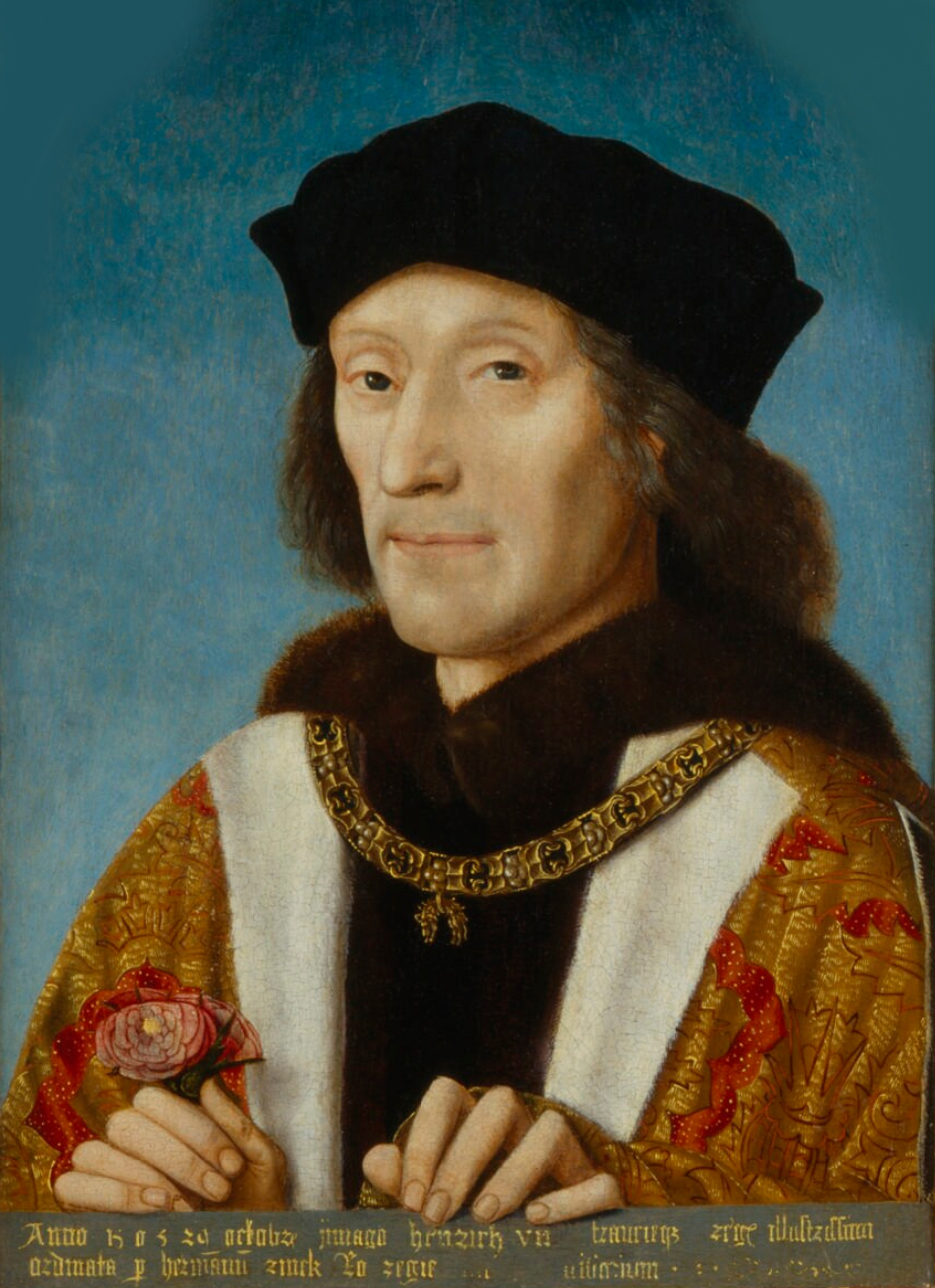
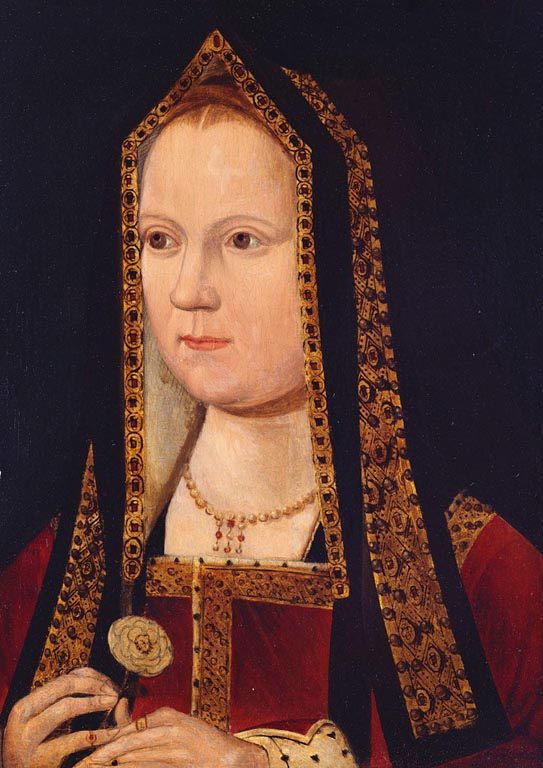
Henry VII and Elizabeth of York, Edmund’s parents

Edmund Tudor was born on 21 February 1499, at Greenwich Palace, Kent. He was baptised in the Church of the Observant Friars on 24 February 1499. The festivities for the christening were considered very splendid. The child was named Edmund after his paternal grandfather, Edmund Tudor, 1st Earl of Richmond, father of King Henry VII.

His godparents were his paternal grandmother Lady Margaret Beaufort, Edward Stafford, 3rd Duke of Buckingham and Richard Foxe. Lady Margaret Beaufort gave the child a gift of £100 and rewarded the midwife and nurses.

Edmund spent some time in the royal nursery of Eltham Palace with his elder sisters Margaret and Mary and his brother the Duke of York (afterwards King Henry VIII). The eldest sibling, Arthur, did not reside in the nursery with his siblings, as he had his own household.

Edmund was present with his elder siblings Margaret, Mary and Henry when Erasmus and Thomas More visited the royal nursery at Eltham Palace in September 1499. The seven-month-old Edmund was held in the arms of his nurse during the visit.

== Duke of Somerset ==
Edmund is said to have been created Duke of Somerset, but no enrollment of a patent of such creation is to be found. It seems likely that, although he may have been styled Duke of Somerset, he died before he was so created. His elder brother Henry was not created Duke of York until he was above 3 years of age.

== Death ==
Edmund died on 19 June 1500, at Hatfield House in Hatfield, Hertfordshire, aged 15 months. The cause of Edmund's death is unknown, and he could have died of a number of childhood diseases; at the time of his death, however, it is known that the plague was rampant.

King Henry and Queen Elizabeth had travelled to Calais and stayed for 40 days. The royal children were removed from Eltham Palace to the more remote Hatfield House in Hertfordshire for isolation. On 16 June, as the plague abated, Henry and Elizabeth sailed to Dover. It was either during their return or upon their arrival that they received the news of Edmund's death at Hatfield.

== Funeral ==
Edmund was given a state funeral, and records indicate that the king gave over £242 for the prince's burial. He was buried in Westminster Abbey on 22 June 1500. He is buried near his sisters, Elizabeth and, three years later, Katherine, who also both died young.
