= Elizabeth of York =

Queen of England from 1486 to 1503

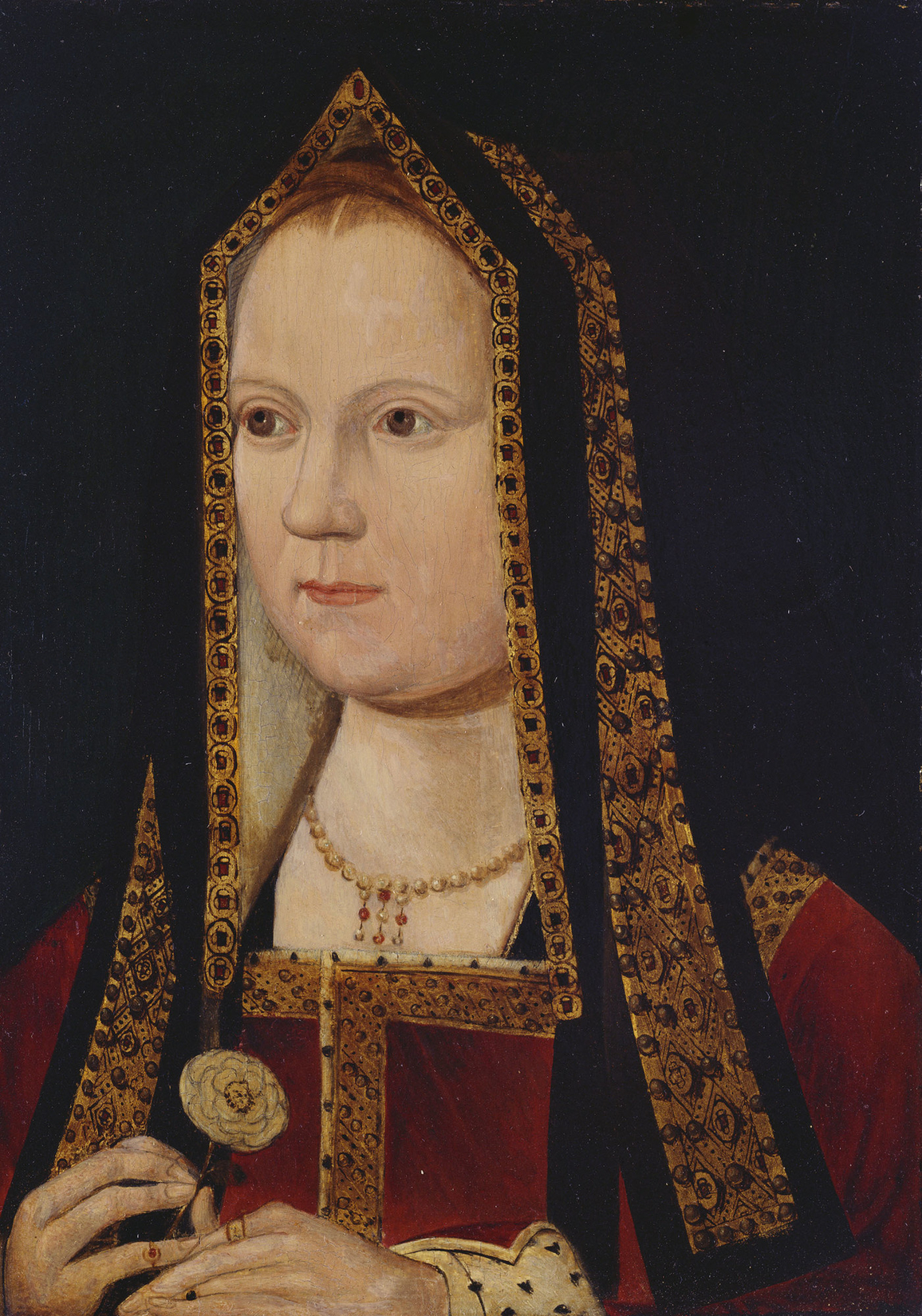
- Portrait of Elizabeth, attributed to Meynnart Wewyck

Queen consort of England
- Tenure: 18 January 1486 – 11 February 1503
- Coronation: 25 November 1487
- Born: 11 February 1466; Westminster Palace, Middlesex, England
- Died: 11 February 1503 (aged 37); Tower of London, London, England
- Burial: 24 February 1503; Westminster Abbey
- Spouse: Henry VII of England (m. 1486)
- Issue more...: Arthur, Prince of Wales; Margaret, Queen of Scots; Henry VIII, King of England; Elizabeth of England; Mary, Queen of France; Edmund, Duke of Somerset
- House: York
- Father: Edward IV of England
- Mother: Elizabeth Woodville

Elizabeth of York (11 February 1466 – 11 February 1503) was Queen of England from her marriage to King Henry VII on 18 January 1486 until she died in 1503. She was the daughter of King Edward IV and Elizabeth Woodville, and her marriage to Henry VII followed his victory at the Battle of Bosworth Field, the penultimate battle of the Wars of the Roses.

Elizabeth's younger brothers, the "Princes in the Tower", mysteriously disappeared from the Tower of London shortly after their uncle Richard III seized the throne in 1483. Although the 1484 Act of Parliament Titulus Regius declared the marriage of her parents as invalid, Elizabeth and her sisters returned to court under Richard III, after spending ten months in sanctuary in Westminster Abbey. It was rumoured that Richard was plotting to marry his niece Elizabeth. The final victory of the Lancastrian faction in the Wars of the Roses may have seemed a further disaster for the Yorkist princess. However, Henry Tudor knew the importance of Yorkist support for his invasion and promised to marry Elizabeth before he arrived in England. This may well have contributed to the haemorrhaging of Yorkist support for Richard, and her future husband had Titulus Regius repealed when he took the throne.

Elizabeth seems to have played little part in politics after coming to the throne. Her marriage appears to have been a successful and happy one, although her eldest son, Arthur, Prince of Wales, died aged 15 in 1502, and three other children died young. Her second and only surviving son became king of England as Henry VIII, while her daughters Margaret and Mary became the queens consort of Scotland and France respectively.

== Ancestry and early life ==
=== Birth ===
Elizabeth was born on 11 February 1466 at the Palace of Westminster as the eldest child of King Edward IV and his wife, Elizabeth Woodville. Her christening was celebrated at Westminster Abbey, sponsored by her grandmothers, Jacquetta of Luxembourg, Duchess of Bedford, and Cecily Neville, Duchess of York. During her childhood, she was put in care of the royal governess Elizabeth, Lady Darcy. Although she was never formally proclaimed as such, many historians regard Elizabeth as having become heiress presumptive to the English throne upon her birth, owing to her father having based his claim on being the most senior descendant of Edward III by way of cognatic primogeniture.

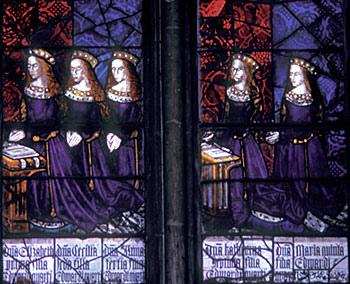
Elizabeth with her sisters. She is the first from the left.

In 1469, aged three, she was briefly betrothed to George Neville, who was created the Duke of Bedford in anticipation of the marriage. His father, John, later supported George's uncle, the Earl of Warwick, in a rebellion against Edward IV, and the betrothal was called off. In 1475, Louis XI agreed to the marriage of nine-year-old Elizabeth to his son Charles, the Dauphin of France. In 1482, however, Louis XI reneged on his promise. She was named a Lady of the Garter in 1477, at the age of eleven, along with her mother and her paternal aunt Elizabeth of York, Duchess of Suffolk.

=== Sister of King Edward V ===
On 9 April 1483, Elizabeth's father died unexpectedly. Her brother Edward, still a child, ascended the throne as Edward V, and her uncle Richard, Duke of Gloucester, was appointed regent and protector of his young nephew. Gloucester took steps to isolate his nephews from their Woodville relations, including their own mother.

Gloucester acted quickly to intercept Edward V while the latter was travelling from Ludlow, where he had been living as Prince of Wales, to London to be crowned king. Edward V was placed in the royal residence of the Tower of London, ostensibly for his protection, while his uncle Anthony Woodville and half-brother Richard Grey, who had both been escorting him, were arrested and sent to Pontefract Castle. Elizabeth Woodville fled with her younger son Richard and her daughters, taking sanctuary in Westminster Abbey. Gloucester asked Thomas Bourchier, the Archbishop of Canterbury, to take Richard with him, so that the boy could reside in the Tower and keep his brother Edward company. Elizabeth Woodville, under duress, eventually agreed.

Two months later, on 22 June 1483, Edward IV's marriage was declared invalid. It was claimed that Edward IV had, at the time of his marriage to Elizabeth Woodville, already been married to Lady Eleanor Butler. Parliament issued a bill, Titulus Regius ("Royal Title"), in support of this position. This measure legally bastardized the children of Edward IV, made them ineligible for the succession, and declared Gloucester the rightful king, with the right of succession reverting to the children of George, Duke of Clarence, another late brother of Gloucester, who had been attainted in 1478. Elizabeth's brother Anthony Woodville and her son Richard Grey were executed on Gloucester's orders on 25 June. Gloucester was crowned king as Richard III on 6 July 1483, and Edward and Richard disappeared soon afterwards. Rumours began to spread that they had been murdered, and these appear to have been increasingly widely credited, even though some undoubtedly emanated from overseas.

=== Niece of King Richard III ===
According to Polydore Vergil, Elizabeth's mother made an alliance with Lady Margaret Beaufort, mother of Henry Tudor, later King Henry VII, who presented himself as the closest claimant to the throne among the Lancastrian party. Although Henry Tudor was descended from King Edward III, his claim to the throne was weak, owing to Letters Patent of King Henry IV in 1407, which barred accession to the throne to any heirs of the legitimised offspring of Henry's great-great-grandparents, John of Gaunt and Katherine Swynford. Whether these Letters Patent had force of law is disputed. Furthermore, there were legitimate Lancastrian lines into the Royal Houses of Portugal and Castile. Whatever the merits of Henry's claim, according to Vergil, his mother and Elizabeth Woodville agreed he should move to claim the throne and, once he had taken it, marry Elizabeth of York to boost his feeble claim. In December 1483, in the cathedral of Rennes, Henry Tudor swore an oath promising to marry her and began planning an invasion.

In March 1484, Elizabeth Woodville and her daughters were persuaded, according to the Crowland Chronicle, to withdraw from sanctuary under "frequent intercessions and dire threats". Richard III additionally swore a public oath, promising that they would "not suffer any manner hurt" nor would he "imprison [them] within the Tower of London or other prison". It was rumoured that Richard III intended to marry Elizabeth of York because his wife, Anne Neville, was dying and they had no surviving children. The Crowland Chronicle claimed that Richard III was forced to deny this unsavoury rumour. Soon after Anne Neville's death, Richard III sent Elizabeth away from court to the Sheriff Hutton Castle and opened negotiations with King John II of Portugal to marry his sister, Joan, Princess of Portugal, and to have Elizabeth marry their cousin, the future King Manuel I of Portugal.

Henry Tudor and his army landed in Wales on 7 August 1485 and marched inland. On 22 August, Henry Tudor and Richard III fought the Battle of Bosworth Field. Richard III had the larger army, but was betrayed by one of his most powerful nobles, William Stanley, and became the last English king to die in battle. Henry Tudor took the crown by right of conquest as Henry VII.

== Queen of England ==
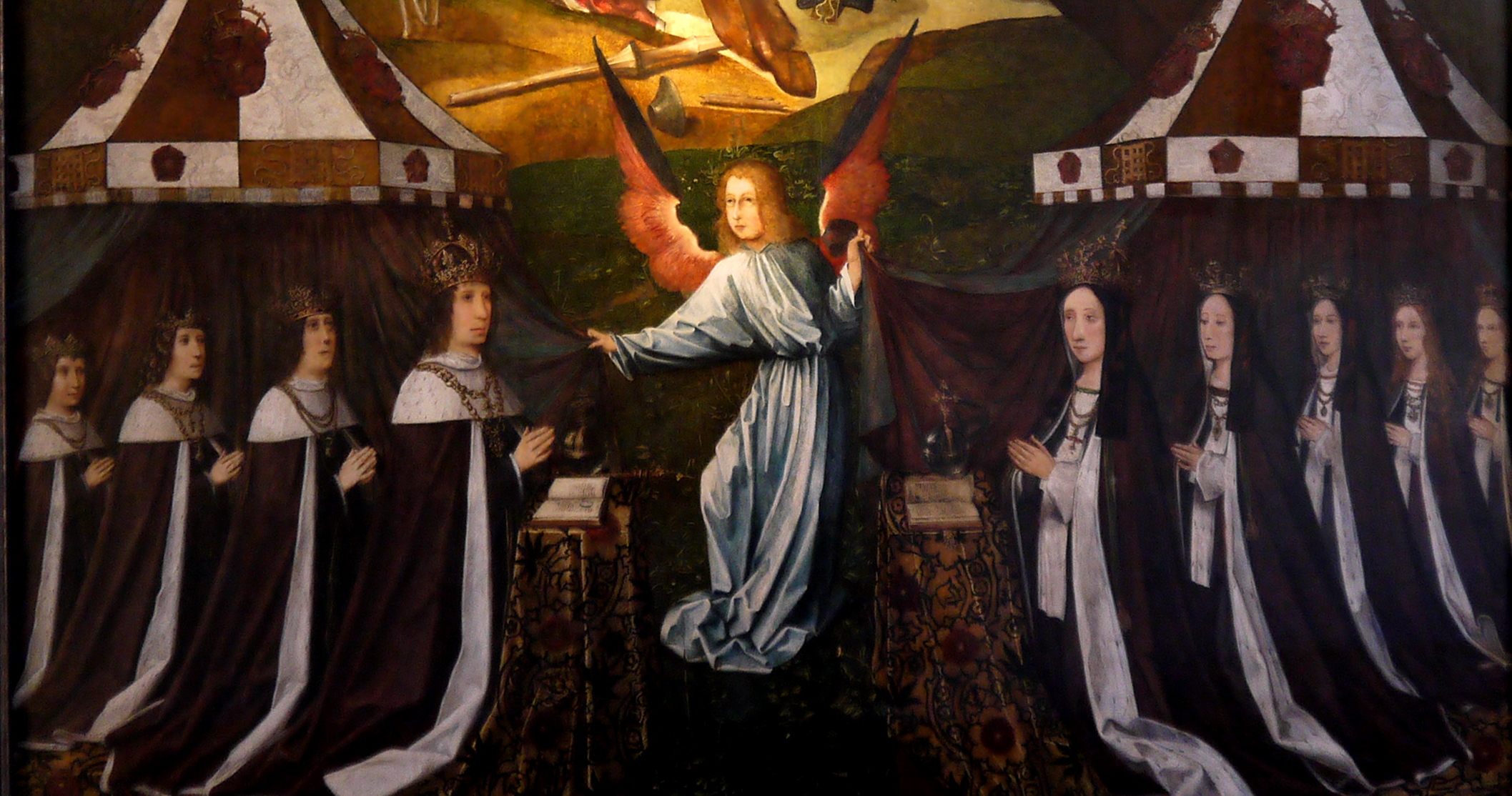
Henry VII and Elizabeth with their children

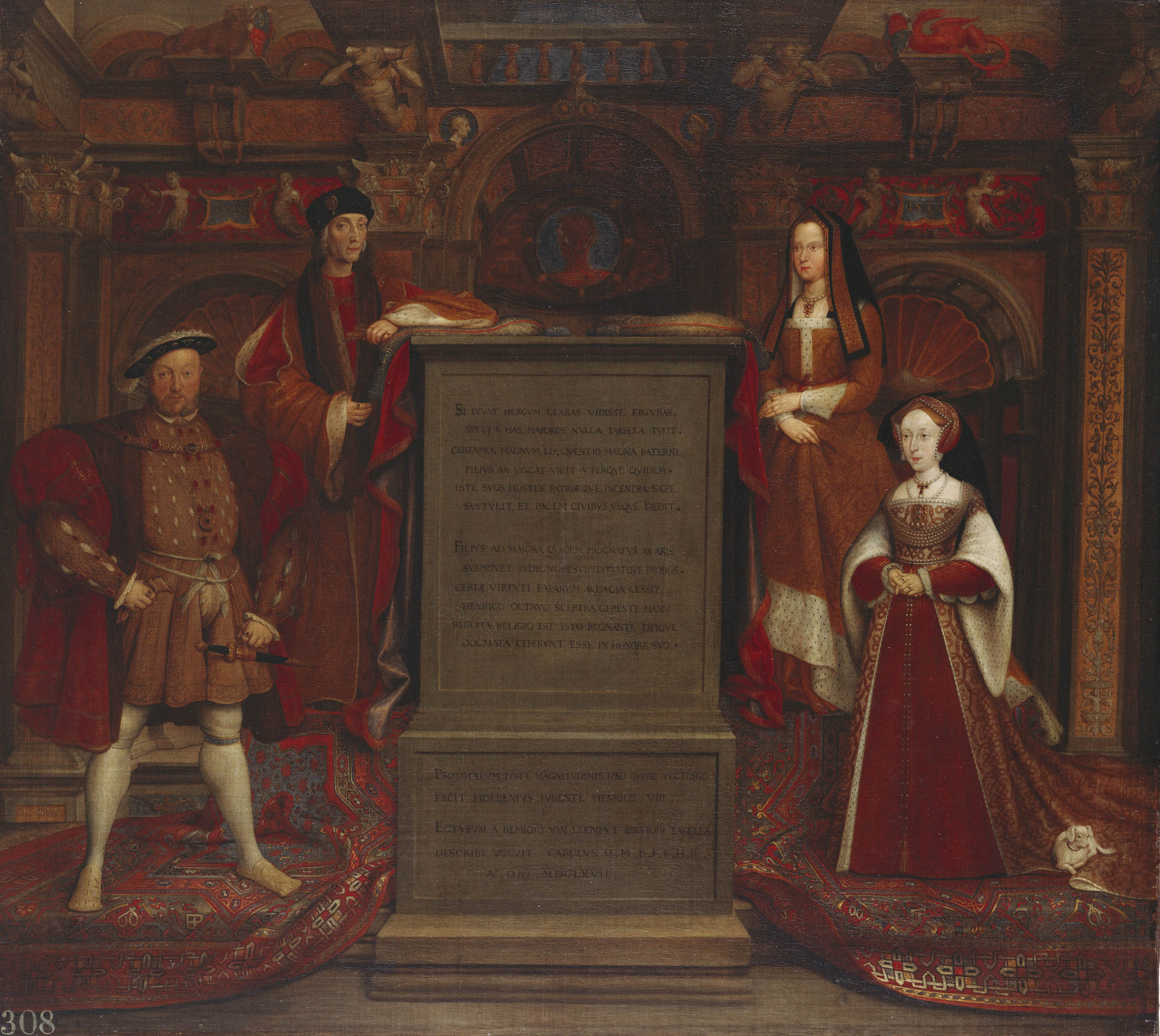
Copy in oils of the 1536–37 Hans Holbein Whitehall mural, commissioned by Charles II, 1667. Left to right: Henry VIII, Henry VII, Elizabeth of York, Jane Seymour.

=== Marriage to Henry VII ===
Though initially slow to keep his promise, Henry VII acknowledged the necessity of marrying Elizabeth of York to ensure the stability of his rule and weaken the claims of other surviving members of the House of York. Henry wished to be seen as ruling in his own right, having claimed the throne by right of conquest and not by his marriage to the de facto heiress of the House of York. He had no intention of sharing power.

Henry VII had the Act of Titulus Regius repealed, thereby legitimising anew the children of Edward IV, and acknowledging Edward V as his predecessor. Though Richard III was regarded as a usurper, his reign was not ignored. Henry and Elizabeth required a papal dispensation to wed because of Canon Law frowning upon affinity: Henry and Elizabeth were descended from, respectively, John of Gaunt and his younger brother Edmund in the 4th degree, an issue that had caused much dispute and bloodshed as to which claim was superior. Two applications were sent, the first more locally, and the second one was slow in reaching Rome and slow to return with the response of the Pope. Ultimately, however, the marriage was approved by papal bull of Pope Innocent VIII dated March 1486 (two months after the wedding) stating that the Pope and his advisors "Approveth confirmyth and stablishyth the matrimonye and coniuncion made betwene our sou[er]ayn lord King Henre the seuenth of the house of Lancastre of that one party And the noble Princesse Elyzabeth of the house of Yorke."

Arms of Elizabeth as queen consort of England

Because the journey to Rome and back took many months, and because Henry as king wanted to be certain that nobody could claim that his wedding to Elizabeth was unlawful or sinful, the more local application was obeyed first—it was sent to the papal legate for England and Scotland, which returned in January 1486. Cardinal Bourchier, Archbishop of Canterbury, officiated at the wedding of Henry VII and Elizabeth of York on 18 January 1486. Their first son, Arthur, was born on 20 September 1486, eight months after their marriage. Elizabeth of York was crowned queen on 25 November 1487. She gave birth to several more children, but only four survived infancy: Arthur, Margaret, Henry and Mary.

=== Relationship with Henry Tudor ===
Despite their marriage being a political arrangement, records indicate both partners appear to have slowly fallen in love with each other. Thomas Penn, in his biography of Henry VII writes that "[t]hough founded on pragmatism, Henry and Elizabeth's marriage had nevertheless blossomed throughout the uncertainty and upheaval of the previous eighteen years. This was a marriage of 'faithful love', of mutual attraction, affection and respect, from which the king seems to have drawn great strength."

In order to maintain stability and peace after ending a civil war that had lasted 32 years, the new Tudor dynasty needed to put an end to the quarrelling Yorkist and Lancastrian families. Elizabeth's sisters, Cecily and Anne of York, and her cousin, Margaret Pole, were married to Lancastrian men who were loyal to Henry. Similar strategies had been used before by Richard III of England, though in that case the Titulus Regius had marred the status of Elizabeth and all of her sisters as illegitimate, and Richard had no intention of making it difficult for the two sides of the conflict to return to factionalism when two were married into one – his actions showed he was more interested in loyalty and eliminating rival claims by wedding them off to the inconsequential. Richard did this directly to Elizabeth's sister, Cecily, by wedding her to Richard Scrope. Elizabeth, therefore, had a motive to see to the successful welfare of her female relatives, but by no means could she foresee whether it would guarantee peace at last.

Further complicating things is that the public image of Henry Tudor, handed down through time only accords with the last years of his reign. Where, when, and how he spent his money is traceable by surviving documents, some written by the king himself and many more having his signature "Henry R" to indicate his oversight of entries, both his personal and the realm's finances, documented in careful detail. Elizabeth was a pious woman and one of her life passions was charity, one of the three theological virtues of the Catholic Church. She gave away money and alms, to the point she indebted herself on many occasions. She also gave generously to monks and religious orders.

Elizabeth received a grand coronation where she was carried on a royal barge down the Thames. Henry VII was as much a builder as his son and granddaughter and Elizabeth had a hand in designing the new Greenwich Palace. The rebuilding at Greenwich commenced in 1498. In 1502, the master mason Robert Vertue was paid for working to a plan described as the "new platt of Greenwich which was devised by the Queen". The Palace was well appointed for large scale entertaining. Records are very clear that Christmas was a raucous and special time for the royal family on the whole, evidenced by many surviving documents depicting a particularly lively court having a marvelous time, with copious amounts of imported wine, great amounts of money spent upon roasted meats, and entertainers. Henry also frequently bought gifts for Elizabeth and their children. The account books, kept by Henry, demonstrate that he spent a great deal of gold on expensive cloth for himself, his wife and his children.

Elizabeth of York did not exercise much political influence as queen due to her strong-minded mother-in-law Lady Margaret Beaufort. Elizabeth was reported to be gentle, kind and generous to her relations, servants and benefactors. One report does state that Henry VII chose to appoint Elizabeth's choice for a vacant bishopric over his mother's choice, showing Henry's affection for, and willingness to listen to, Elizabeth. She seems to have had a love of books, patronising the English printer William Caxton. Elizabeth of York, seemingly a patron of the English votive style, commissioned an antiphon in devotion to Mary and St Elizabeth from Robert Fayrfax, paying him twenty shillings for his work in 1502. Elizabeth of York also enjoyed dancing and gambling; the last of these was a pastime she shared with her husband. She also kept greyhounds.

As queen, Elizabeth made arrangements for the education of her younger children, including the future Henry VIII. She also accompanied her husband on his diplomatic visit to Calais in 1500 to meet with Philip I of Castile. She corresponded with Queen Isabella I of Castile before their children's marriage.

On 14 November 1501, Elizabeth of York's 15-year-old son Arthur married Catherine of Aragon, daughter of King Ferdinand II of Aragon and Queen Isabella I of Castile. The pair were sent to Ludlow Castle, the traditional residence of the Prince of Wales. Arthur died in April 1502. The news of Arthur's death caused Henry VII to break down in grief, as much in fear for his dynasty as in mourning for his son. Elizabeth comforted him, telling him that he was the only child of his mother but had survived to become king, that God had left him with a son and two daughters, and that they were both young enough to have more children. When she returned to her own chambers, however, Elizabeth herself broke down with grief. Her attendants sent for Henry who, in turn, comforted her.

== Death and aftermath ==
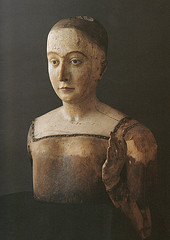
Elizabeth's painted wood funeral effigy (without clothes), 1503, Westminster Abbey

In 1502, Elizabeth became pregnant once more and spent her confinement period in the Tower of London. Her embroiderer Robynet made her a new rich bed with curtains decorated with clouds and roses. On 2 February 1503, she gave birth to a daughter, Katherine, who died a few days later. Succumbing to a postpartum infection, Elizabeth died on 11 February, her 37th birthday. Her family seems to have been devastated by her death and mourned her deeply. According to one biographer, the death of Elizabeth "broke the heart" of her husband and "shattered him". Another account says that Henry Tudor "privily departed to a solitary place and would no man should resort unto him". Within a little over two years, King Henry VII had lost his eldest son, his wife, his baby daughter, and found himself having to honour the Treaty of Perpetual Peace by sending his eldest daughter, Margaret, to Scotland.

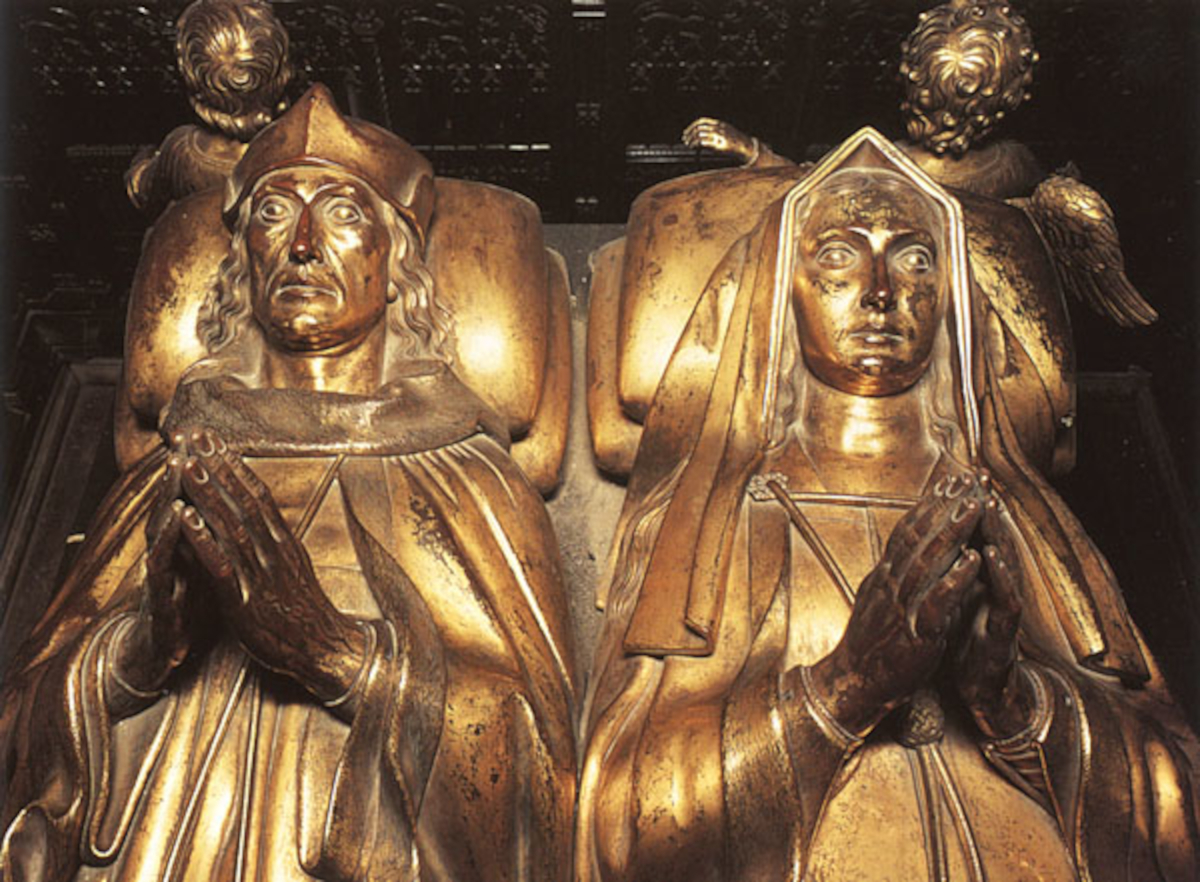
Tomb effigies of Elizabeth of York and Henry VII by Pietro Torrigiano, Westminster Abbey.

In 2012, the Vaux Passional, an illuminated manuscript that was once the property of Henry VII, was rediscovered in the National Library of Wales. It depicts the aftermath of Elizabeth's death vividly. Henry VII is shown receiving the book containing the manuscript in mourning robes with a doleful expression on his face. In the background, behind their father, are the late queen's daughters, Mary and Margaret, in black veils. The red head of 11-year-old Prince Henry is shown weeping into the sheets of his mother's empty bed.

Henry VII entertained thoughts of remarriage to renew the alliance with Spain—Joanna, Dowager Queen of Naples (daughter of Ferdinand I of Naples), Joanna, Queen of Castile (daughter of Ferdinand and Isabella), and Margaret, Dowager Duchess of Savoy (sister-in-law of Joanna of Castile), were all considered —but he died a widower in 1509. On each anniversary of her death, he decreed that a requiem mass be sung, the bells be tolled, and 100 candles be lit in her honour. Henry also continued to employ her minstrels each New Year.

Henry VII's reputation for miserliness became worse after Elizabeth's death. He was buried with Elizabeth under their effigies in his Westminster Abbey chapel. Her tomb was opened in the 19th century and the wood casing of her lead coffin was found to have been removed to create space for the interment of her great-great-grandson James VI and I.

== Issue ==
- Arthur, Prince of Wales (20 September 1486 – 2 April 1502)
- Margaret, Queen of Scotland (28 November 1489 – 18 October 1541)
- Henry VIII, King of England (28 June 1491 – 28 January 1547)
- Elizabeth (2 July 1492 – 14 September 1495), buried in St Edward's Chapel, Westminster Abbey
- Mary, Queen of France (18 March 1496 – 25 June 1533)
- Edmund, Duke of Somerset (21 February 1499 – 19 June 1500), buried in Westminster Abbey without a monument
- Katherine (2 February 1503 – 10 or 18 February 1503), buried in Westminster Abbey

== Appearance and legacy ==
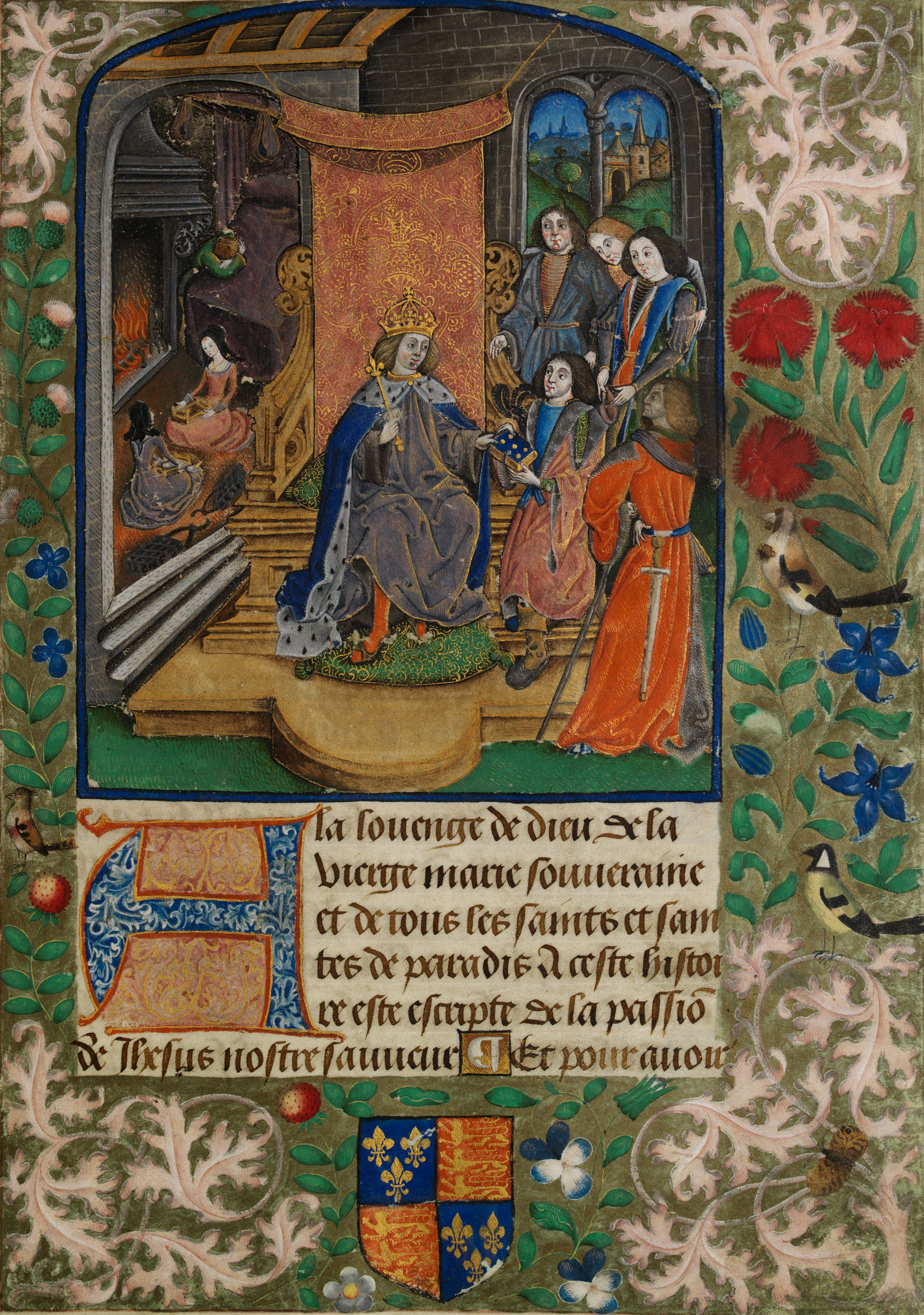
Presentation miniature from the Vaux Passional

The symbol of the Tudor dynasty is the Tudor rose, which became a royal symbol for England upon Elizabeth's marriage to Henry VII in 1486. Her White Rose of York is most commonly proper to her husband's Red Rose of Lancaster and today, uncrowned, is still the floral emblem of England.

Henry VIII owned a version of her portrait, displayed with a silk curtain, described in his inventory as a "table with the Picture of Quene Elizabeth with a Curten of yellowe & white sarceonet paned togethers". Her portrait may have been painted by Meynnart Wewyck. Pietro Torrigiano made bronze effigies of Elizabeth and Henry VII for their monument at Westminster Abbey.

Elizabeth of York was renowned as a great beauty for her time, with regular features, tall in stature, and a fair complexion, inheriting many traits from her father and her mother Elizabeth Woodville, who was considered at one point the most beautiful woman in the British Isles. She inherited her father's height, most women of her generation being considerably smaller than five feet six inches (168 cm).

Despite not being as controversial as her son Henry VIII, Elizabeth of York is present in English folklore. A popular myth indicates that the queen image on the Queen of Hearts card represents Elizabeth, as does the queen eating bread and honey at the parlour in the song "Sing a Song of Sixpence."

== Depiction in media ==
=== Film ===
- Richard III (1995), played by Kate Steavenson-Payne

=== Television ===
- The Shadow of the Tower (1972), played by Norma West
- The White Queen (2013), played by Freya Mavor
- The White Princess (2017), played by Jodie Comer
- The Spanish Princess (2019), played by Alexandra Moen

== Ancestry and family tree ==
=== Ancestry ===
Ancestors of Elizabeth of York

8. Richard of Conisburgh, 3rd Earl of Cambridge
4. Richard Plantagenet, 3rd Duke of York
9. Anne de Mortimer
2. Edward IV of England
10. Ralph Neville, 1st Earl of Westmorland
5. Cecily Neville
11. Joan Beaufort
1. Elizabeth of York
12. Richard Wydeville
6. Richard Woodville, 1st Earl Rivers
13. Joan Bedlisgate
3. Elizabeth Woodville
14. Peter I, Count of Saint-Pol
7. Jacquetta of Luxembourg
15. Margaret of Baux

=== Family tree ===
Elizabeth's father, uncle, brother, husband, and son were all Kings of England and two daughters were queens consort of other countries.

Family tree of Elizabeth of York

Edward IV; 1442–1483; King of England	Richard III; 1452–1485; King of England
Henry VII; 1457–1509; King of England	Elizabeth of York; Queen consort of England; 1466–1503	Edward V 1470–1483; King of England
James IV; 1473–1513; King of Scotland	Margaret Tudor; 1489–1541; Queen consort of Scotland	Henry VIII; 1491–1547; King of England	Mary Tudor; 1496–1533; Queen consort of France and Naples	Louis XII; 1462–1516; King of France and Naples

Elizabeth of York House of York Cadet branch of the House of Plantagenet Born: 11 February 1466 Died: 11 February 1503
English royalty
Vacant Title last held by Anne Neville	Queen consort of England; Lady of Ireland; 18 January 1486 – 11 February 1503	Vacant Title next held by Catherine of Aragon
