= Francis Wedgwood, 2nd Baron Wedgwood =

The Right Honourable The Lord Wedgwood
- Born: Francis Charles Bowen Wedgwood; 20 January 1898; Barlaston, Staffordshire
- Died: 22 April 1959 (aged 61)
- Spouse: Edith May Telfer
- Children: Hugh Wedgwood, 3rd Baron Wedgwood
- Parent(s): Josiah Wedgwood, 1st Baron Wedgwood; Ethel Kate Bowen

Francis Charles Bowen Wedgwood, 2nd Baron Wedgwood of Barlaston (20 January 1898 – 22 April 1959) was a British artist and hereditary peer.

== Biography ==
Wedgwood was born on 20 January 1898, in Barlaston, Staffordshire, the son of Josiah Wedgwood, 1st Baron Wedgwood and his wife Ethel Kate Bowen, the daughter of Charles Bowen, 1st Baron Bowen. He was the great-great-great-grandson of the potter Josiah Wedgwood and was educated at Bedales School.

During the First World War he served as an officer in the Royal Navy Volunteer Reserve and later the Royal Flying Corps. After the war, in 1920, he married Edith May Telfer, daughter of William Telfer of Glasgow. They had one son, Hugh Wedgwood (born 1921), later 3rd Baron Wedgwood. Wedgwood studied at the Burslem School of Art (1920–1922), and the Slade School of Art (1922–1925). He exhibited at the New English Art Club, (1927–1930) and Royal Academy (1931–1939). Upon the death of his father in 1943, he became the 2nd Baron Wedgwood. Upon his own death in 1959, the title passed to his only son, Hugh Wedgwood, 3rd Baron Wedgwood.

Peerage of the United Kingdom
Preceded by Josiah Wedgwood IV	Baron Wedgwood; 1943–1959	Succeeded by Hugh Wedgwood
