= Camilla Wedgwood =

British anthropologist

The Honourable Camilla Wedgwood
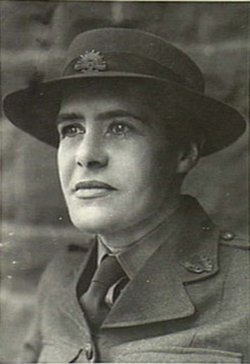
- Wedgwood in 1944
- Born: Camilla Hildegarde Wedgwood; 25 March 1901; Newcastle-upon-Tyne, England
- Died: 17 May 1955 (aged 54); Sydney, Australia
- Education: Orme Girls' School; Bedales School
- Alma mater: Bedford College, London; Newnham College, Cambridge
- Occupation: Anthropologist
- Parent(s): Josiah Wedgwood, 1st Baron Wedgwood and Ethel Bowen Wedgwood

Camilla Hildegarde Wedgwood (25 March 1901 – 17 May 1955) was a British anthropologist and academic administrator. She is best known for her research in the Pacific and her pioneering role as one of the British Commonwealth's first female anthropologists.

== Early life and education ==
Wedgwood was born on 25 March 1901 in Newcastle upon Tyne, England. Her father was Josiah Wedgwood later the first Baron Wedgwood. Her mother, Ethel Bowen Wedgwood, was the daughter of a Lord Justice of Appeal, Charles Bowen. She was a member of the extensive Wedgwood family. Her parents separated in 1914 and divorced in 1919.

Wedgwood was educated at two private schools: Orme Girls' School in Newcastle-under-Lyme, Staffordshire, and at Bedales School in Steep, Hampshire. She studied at Bedford College, London and at Newnham College, Cambridge. At the University of Cambridge, she studied for both the English and anthropology Tripos. She completed both, leaving with first class honours but no degree (women were not awarded degrees by Cambridge until 1948). She was awarded Master of Arts status by Cambridge in 1927. She studied under Bronisław Malinowski at Bedford College and Alfred Cort Haddon at Cambridge.

== Career ==
After leaving the University of Cambridge, Wedgwood returned to Bedford College as an assistant lecturer in the Department of Social Studies. After Arthur Bernard Deacon's death in 1927, she was invited to move to the University of Sydney to replace him as lecturer in anthropology. She was also asked by Alfred Radcliffe-Brown to edit Deacon's remaining field notes in preparation for publication. These field notes were published as "Malekula: A Vanishing People in the New Hebrides" in 1934. In 1930, she held a temporary lectureship in the Department of African Life and Languages at the University of Cape Town. From 1930 to 1932, having returned to England, she was a lecturer at the London School of Economics and personal assistant to Bronisław Malinowski.

In 1932, Wedgwood was awarded a fellowship by the Australian Research Council to conduct fieldwork on Manam Island off the north coast of Papua New Guinea on the border of modern Madang and East Sepik provinces. Also in 1932, she became a Member of Council of the Royal Anthropological Institute. In June 1935, she was appointed principal of The Women's College, University of Sydney. During this time, she became an active member of Sydney high society. She left the appointment in 1944 to join the military.

During World War II, Wedgwood was involved in formulating policy on education and administration in Papua New Guinea. Having renounced her pacifism, she volunteered for the Australian Army Medical Women's Service and was commissioned as a temporary lieutenant colonel in January 1944. After two years of service, she was demobilized in 1946.

After the war, Wedgwood took a position at the Australian School of Pacific Administration, which was responsible for training Australian colonial officers and administrators. She continued in this role until her death on 17 May 1955 of lung cancer at Royal North Shore Hospital, Sydney.

Wedgwood Close in the Canberra suburb of Chisholm is named in her honor.

== Personal life ==
Wedgwood was a member of the Religious Society of Friends (the Quakers) and as such was a pacifist. During the Second World War she was the president of the Federal Pacifist Council. However, she was increasingly attracted to Anglicanism during her time in Australia and particularly to the Anglo-Catholic wing of the church. She was received into the Church of England in Australia in 1944.

== Selected works ==
- Deacon, A. Bernard (1934). Wedgwood, Camilla H. (ed.). Malekula: A Vanishing People in the New Hebrides. London: Routledge.
