= Josiah Wedgwood, 1st Baron Wedgwood =

British politician

Colonel The Right Honourable The Lord Wedgwood DSO PC DL

Chancellor of the Duchy of Lancaster
- In office 22 January – 3 November 1924
- Prime Minister: Ramsay MacDonald
- Preceded by: J. C. C. Davidson
- Succeeded by: The Viscount Cecil of Chelwood

Personal details
- Born: 16 March 1872
- Died: 26 July 1943 (aged 71)

Colonel Josiah Clement Wedgwood, 1st Baron Wedgwood, DSO, PC, DL (16 March 1872 – 26 July 1943), sometimes referred to as Josiah Wedgwood IV, was a British Liberal and Labour politician who served in government under Ramsay MacDonald. He was a prominent single-tax activist following the political-economic reformer Henry George. He was the great-great-grandson of the potter Josiah Wedgwood.

== Background ==
Josiah Wedgwood was born at Barlaston in Staffordshire, the son of Clement Wedgwood. He was the great-great-grandson of the potter Josiah Wedgwood. His mother, Emily Catherine, was the daughter of the engineer James Meadows Rendel. He was educated at Clifton College and then studied at the Royal Naval College, Greenwich.

He married his first cousin Ethel Kate Bowen (1869–1952), the daughter of Sir Charles Bowen, 1st Baron Bowen, in 1894, but she left him in 1913 and divorced him in 1919. Since divorce at that time required a guilty party, he agreed to take the blame and was found guilty of adultery and desertion of his wife and children, which led to criticism from the press and pulpit. More criticism was levelled after the divorce was final, and he revealed that the desertion had been a formality and the adultery staged. They had seven children:

- Helen Bowen Wedgwood (1895–1981), married geneticist Michael Pease, son of Edward Reynolds Pease. One of their sons was physicist Bas Pease and one of their daughters, Jocelyn Richenda Gammell Pease (1925–2003), married biologist Andrew Huxley.
- Rosamund Wedgwood (1896–1960)
- Francis Charles Bowen Wedgwood (1898–1959), 2nd Baron Wedgwood. He was father of the 3rd Baron.
- Josiah Wedgwood V (1899–1968), managing director of Wedgwood. He was father of Dr John Wedgwood (1919–2007), former heir presumptive to the barony.
- Camilla Hildegarde Wedgwood (1901–1955), anthropologist
- Elizabeth Julia Wedgwood (1907–1993)
- Gloria Wedgwood (1909–1974)

In 1919, he remarried; his second wife was Florence Ethel Willett (1878–1969).

== Military and political career ==
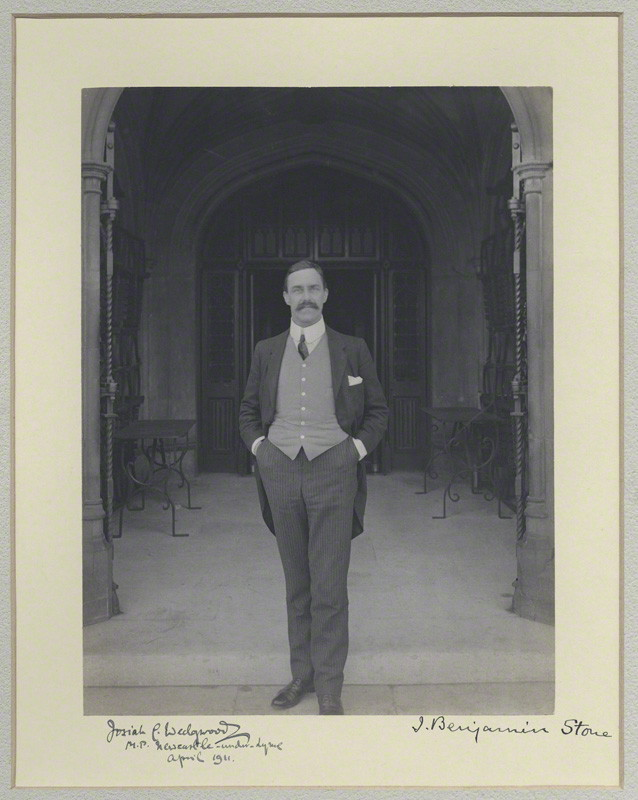
Wedgwood photographed by John Benjamin Stone in 1911

His mother's family was involved both financially and in the management of Elswick Shipyards and Armstrongs Armament manufacturers in Newcastle upon Tyne. Josiah was sent to the Royal Naval College, Greenwich, to study naval architecture before going to work at Elswick.

He worked for a year from 1895 as an Assistant Naval Constructor in Portsmouth before he returned to Newcastle upon Tyne to head Armstrong's drawing office.

In 1891, he was commissioned in the 1st Northumberland (Western Division, Royal Artillery). Following the outbreak of the Second Boer War in late 1899, he was given the army rank of captain on 3 March 1900 and for three years commanded a volunteer battery of the Royal Field Artillery equipped with naval guns. He returned to South Africa after the war and spent two years as a resident magistrate in the Ermelo District, in the Transvaal Colony. His studies of native land laws gave him an interest in land reform, and later, influenced by the writings of Henry George, he developed a lifelong belief in the single tax and advocated a tax on property to replace taxes on income and goods as a way of securing for workers the full reward for their work. He became president of the League for the Taxation of Land Values in 1908.

Having returned to England, Wedgwood was elected as member of parliament (MP) for Newcastle-under-Lyme at the 1906 general election. Though he stood for the Liberal Party, he made it clear that he would take an independent line in Parliament if necessary, in accordance with his conscience. He was re-elected at both the January and December 1910 elections, and that year was also elected to Staffordshire County Council, remaining a councillor until 1918. He became disillusioned with the Liberals after 1910, when it became clear that the government would not honour campaign commitments to land reform and opposing vested interests. His disillusionment was increased by the government's reaction against the suffragettes, whom he also supported. In 1913 he staged a filibuster against the government's Mental Deficiency Bill, which he saw as authoritarian and unjust.

=== First World War ===
Following the outbreak of the First World War, he volunteered for service with the Royal Naval Volunteer Reserve and held the rank of lieutenant-commander. He returned to mechanical work and was posted to the Armoured Car Section of the Royal Naval Air Service. He served in Belgium and France in 1914 with the armoured cars. He was wounded in the Dardanelles Campaign in 1915, receiving the Distinguished Service Order for his service during the landing at Cape Helles, commanding the machine guns on SS River Clyde. It was while serving at Gallipoli that he met volunteers of the Zion Mule Corps, commanded by Joseph Trumpeldor, which would affect his views about British policy on Palestine. Back in Parliament, he expressed concern at under-staffing and support for national service though he also defended the rights of conscientious objectors. Later that year, he was posted as an army captain to the staff of General Jan Smuts in East Africa. In 1916, he was part of the Mesopotamia Commission of Inquiry.

Promoted to major, he commanded a machine gun company in the 2nd South African Infantry Brigade in 1916. In 1917 he became assistant director of Trench Warfare with the rank of colonel. At the start of 1918 he was sent to Siberia where his mission was to encourage continued Russian participation in the war and to gathering intelligence on Bolshevik control in Siberia.

=== 1918 general election ===
In the 1918 general election he sought re-election. There has been some confusion regarding his specific affiliation at the time of the election. He was officially supported by his local Liberal Association and he was officially endorsed by the Coalition Government. This led to him being described in many sources at the time as a Coalition Liberal. However, during the election campaign, he publicly distanced himself from the Coalition Government. His own local election campaign was minimal because he was not opposed. In his election address he stated, "I come before you, the same impenitent independent radical that you first elected in 1906". That had led some to incorrectly describe him in 1918 as an "Independent Radical" even though in 1906, he was classified as a "Liberal". The usually-reliable F. W. S. Craig, in his book British Parliamentary Election results, 1918-1949, described him as an "Independent Liberal". However his status as an official Liberal, rather than an Independent Liberal, was subsequently confirmed when he attended the first meeting of the Liberal parliamentary party on 3 February 1919.

=== Joining Labour ===
In 1919, Wedgwood took the Labour whip in the House of Commons and joined the Independent Labour Party. He enjoyed the freer atmosphere of Labour, and the party warmly welcomed him by electing him joint vice-chairman of the Parliamentary Labour Party in 1921. Wedgwood maintained his reputation for championing new ideas and the interests of outsiders and underdogs. He supported a number of unpopular causes, including opposition to the reparations from Germany contained in the Treaty of Versailles. In 1920, he criticised the government's partition of British territories into Palestine and Transjordan and continued to attack what he saw as its bias against Zionism for the next two decades. That year, he also led a commission from the Labour Party and the Trades Union Congress to Hungary that reported on the harsh treatment of suspected communists under the Horthy regime, which succeeded the revolutionary communist dictatorship of Béla Kun. He supported refugee causes in Britain, particularly that of anarchists from the Soviet Union, such as Emma Goldman. Most of all, he became known for his support of the Indian independence movement.

=== Cabinet and the Lords ===
Josiah Wedgwood

There was tacit co-operation between Labour and the opposition Liberals in some seats at the 1923 general election, and Wedgwood ran unopposed in Newcastle-under-Lyme. Having been re-elected vice-chairman of the party in 1922 and 1923, Wedgwood expected a seat in the Cabinet when Labour formed its first government at the start of 1924. There was speculation in the press that he would be made First Lord of the Admiralty and some expectation that he would become Secretary of State for the Colonies or for India. Sidney Webb believed that Wedgwood would prefer to become President of the Board of Trade and was willing to step aside in his favour. However, Ramsay MacDonald initially offered him only the junior position of Financial Secretary to the Treasury. After some pressing, MacDonald gave him a seat in the Cabinet but with the sinecure title of Chancellor of the Duchy of Lancaster rather than a departmental portfolio. In that capacity, he performed various de facto tasks in government. Later that year, he was appointed Chief Industrial Commissioner, succeeding Arthur Henderson in a difficult position as the government's decision to maintain some of its predecessor's policies on industrial action caused much friction within the Labour movement. He was sworn into the Privy Council in 1924.

He chaired a cabinet committee to contemplate the use of the Emergency Powers Act against strikes in the transport industry. He took a strong line on a number of issues by opposing disarmament and the promise of a loan to the Soviet Union. He was also wary of the state undertaking public works purely for the sake of doing so without any utilitarian benefit.

After the fall of the government, Wedgwood publicly criticised MacDonald's leadership and Labour's reliance on civil servants. He sat on Labour's front bench in opposition and spoke on, amongst other policy areas, local government, where he encouraged Clement Attlee. He was not offered a position in the second Labour government. In March 1929, he became chairman of the House of Commons Records Committee. He began compiling a history of the Commons, a subject that consumed his interest. He wrote a history of Staffordshire's parliamentary representatives from the thirteenth century to the First World War and two volumes of biographies of MPs of the 15th century. Wedgwood's work in this area led eventually to the establishment of the History of Parliament Trust. Throughout the 1930s, he continued to speak in the Commons on issues of importance to him, particularly the Single Tax and native resistance to colonialism. In 1930 and 1931 he was made Mayor of Newcastle-under-Lyme after successfully campaigning for the town to remain independent of Stoke-on-Trent.

From the mid-1930s, he was critical of appeasement and of limitations on the migration of Jews to Palestine (1939 White Paper) and of German refugees to Britain and worked tirelessly to help European Jews. The actor Heinz Bernard's life was saved as a result of a parliamentary question asked by Wedgwood which resulted in his being given a visa to Britain.

During the Second World War, he joined the Home Guard in 1940. In the same year, when Winston Churchill made his famous 'We shall never surrender' speech in the House of Commons (4 June 1940), Wedgwood wrote to him and said: “That was worth 1,000 guns, and the speeches of 1,000 years.”

In 1941 Wedgwood toured the United States to put putting Britain's case against Germany at public meetings. Whilst Wedgwood was in America, Churchill offered him a peerage and invited him to sit for Labour in the House of Lords. Wedgwood accepted, resigned as MP for Newcastle-under-Lyme after 36 years and became Baron Wedgwood, of Barlaston in the County of Stafford on 21 January 1942. The following year he died in London aged 71.

== Zionism ==
Wedgwood was impressed by his contact with the Zion Mule Corps in 1915, while he served in the First World War, and said that he first became aware of Zionism "as a creed" in 1916 when Dorothy Richardson invited him to address a Zionist meeting. In October 1926, Wedgwood, a devoted Zionist, visited Palestine and challenged the Mandatory government's policies in his 1928 book The Seventh Dominion, accusing it of hindering the country's social and economic development. In 1942, he prefaced the booklet STOP THEM NOW, the first public report printed in English about the continuous destruction of the Jews in German-occupied territories: "The Huns and the Mongols, Tamerlane with his mountains of skulls, all these demons of long ago were patterns of chivalry compared with the pureblooded devils into which Hitler has converted Germans".

== Legacy and commemoration ==
- Wedgwood Memorial College, a residential college founded in Stoke-on-Trent in 1945 was named after him.
- Nachal Reuven, a moshav in central Israel, was renamed Gan Yoshiya (Hebrew: גן יאשיה, lit. Josiah's Garden) in his honour.
- The Josiah Wedgwood, a 1946 Aliyah Bet ship (originally the Royal Canadian Navy corvette HMCS Beauharnois) was named after him. The ship was later part of the Israeli Navy as INS Wedgwood (K-18).
- Streets in Jerusalem, Tel Aviv and Haifa bear his name.

== Arms ==
Coat of arms of Josiah Wedgwood, 1st Baron Wedgwood
Crest Upon a ducal coronet a lion passant Argent. Escutcheon Gules four mullets in cross; a canton Argent. Supporters On either side a lion double-queued Argent supporting a staff raguly Gules. Motto Obstantia Discindo

== Works ==
- The Seventh Dominion (1928)

== See also ==
- Darwin–Wedgwood family

Parliament of the United Kingdom
Preceded by Sir Alfred Seale Haslam	Member of Parliament for Newcastle-under-Lyme; 1906–1942	Succeeded by John David Mack
Political offices
Preceded by J. C. C. Davidson	Chancellor of the Duchy of Lancaster; 1924	Succeeded by The Viscount Cecil of Chelwood
Peerage of the United Kingdom
New creation	Baron Wedgwood; 1942–1943	Succeeded by Francis Charles Bowen Wedgwood
