= Queen =

Queen most commonly refers to:

- Queen regnant, a female monarch of a kingdom
- Queen consort, the wife of a reigning king
- Queen (band), a British rock band

Queen or QUEEN may also refer to:

== Monarchy ==
- Queen consort, the wife of a reigning king
- Queen dowager, the widow of a king
  - Queen mother, a queen dowager who is the mother of a reigning monarch
- Queen regnant, a female monarch of a kingdom
  - List of queens regnant

== Biology ==
- Queen, a reproductive female caste in eusociality
  - Queen ant
  - Queen bee
- Queen (butterfly), Danaus gilippus
- Queen, an un-neutered female cat

== Folklore and religion ==
- May Queen, or Queen of May, a personification of the May Day holiday
- Queen of Heaven, a title of Mary, the mother of Jesus
- Queen of Heaven (antiquity), a title given to a number of ancient goddesses

== Media, arts and entertainment ==
=== Fictional characters ===
- Queen (Marvel Comics), Adrianna "Ana" Soria
- Evil Queen, from Snow White
- Red Queen (Through the Looking-Glass)
- Queen of Hearts (Alice's Adventures in Wonderland)
- Queen (Deltarune), a video game character
- Makoto Niijima, a character from Persona 5 (codename "Queen")
- Queen, a character in the manga One Piece

=== Gaming ===
- Queen (chess), the most powerful chess piece that moves horizontally, vertically and diagonally
- Queen (playing card), with a picture of a regal woman on it
- Queen (carrom), a piece in carrom

=== Music ===
- Queen (band), British rock band
  - Queen (Queen album), 1973
- Queen (Nicki Minaj album), 2018
- Queen (soundtrack), soundtrack to the 2014 Indian film
- Queen, a 2011 album by Kaya
- Queen, a 2017 album by Ten Walls
- "Queen", a song by Estelle from the 2018 album Lovers Rock
- "Queen", a song by G Flip featuring Mxmtoon, 2020
- "Queen", a song by Jessie J from the 2018 album R.O.S.E.
- "Queen", a song by Melvins from the 1994 album Stoner Witch
- "Queen", a song by Monsta X from the 2016 EP The Clan Pt. 2 Guilty
- "Queen", a song by Perfume Genius from the 2014 album Too Bright
- "Queen", a song by Shawn Mendes from the 2018 album Shawn Mendes
- "Queen", a 2021 track by Toby Fox from Deltarune Chapter 2 OST from the video game Deltarune
- "Queen", a song by Tracey Thorn from the 2018 album Record
- "Queen", a song by Zior Park, 2023
- "Q.U.E.E.N.", a 2013 song by Janelle Monáe
- Queen Records, a former subsidiary record label of King Records

=== Other uses in arts and entertainment ===
- Drag queen, a person, usually male, wearing traditional women attire for entertainment purposes
- Queen (magazine), a British women's magazine
- Queen: The Story of an American Family, a 1993 book by Alex Haley
  - Alex Haley's Queen, a 1993 TV mini-series
- Queen (2014 film), an Indian comedy film
- Queen (2018 film), an Indian drama thriller
- Queen (web series), a 2019 Indian political drama series
- Queen (2022 miniseries), a 2022 Polish television miniseries
- Queen (Hindi TV series), a 2026 political thriller television drama series

== Places ==
- Queen, New Mexico, US
- Queen, Pennsylvania, US

== People ==
- Queen (name), a given name and surname (including a list of people with the name)
- Sabrina Frederick, Australian rules footballer nicknamed "Queen"

== Transportation ==
- Queen (Canadian automobile), built from 1901 to 1903
- Queen (English automobile), built from 1904 to 1905
- Queen (American automobile), built from 1904 to 1907
- Queen station, a subway station in Toronto, Ontario, Canada
- Queen (ship), the name of several ships
  - Queen (East Indiaman)
  - HMS Queen

== Other uses ==
- Queen (slang), term for a flamboyant or effeminate gay man
- Quaternary Environment of the Eurasian North (QUEEN), a climate research project in the Arctic
- Queen Fine Foods
- Queen sized bed

== See also ==
- Kween (disambiguation)
- Le Queen, a nightclub in Paris
- May Queen (disambiguation)
- Queen bee (disambiguation)
- Queen-mother (disambiguation)
- Queen of the South (disambiguation)
- Queen Street (disambiguation), any of several streets
- Queenie (disambiguation)
- Queening (disambiguation)
- Queens (disambiguation), including "Queen's"
- The Queen (disambiguation)
- Winter Queen (disambiguation)
