= Queens (disambiguation) =

Queens is a borough of New York City.

Queens may also refer to:

== Arts and entertainment ==
=== Music ===
- Queens (group), a Polish musical group
- "Queens" (song), a 2018 song by Saara Aalto
- "Queens", a song by Caravan Palace from Panic, 2012
- "Queens", a song by MisterWives from their debut album Our Own House

=== Film and television ===
- Queens (film), a 2005 Spanish film
- The Queens (2015 film), a Chinese romance film based on the novel of the same name
- The Queens (2019 film), a Canadian documentary film
- Queen's (TV series), a 2007 Taiwanese romantic comedy television series
- The Queens (TV series), a 2008 Chinese historical drama television series
- Queens: The Virgin and the Martyr, a 2017 Spanish and British historical drama television series
- Queens (American TV series), an American musical drama television series 2021–2022
- Queens (Bluey), an episode of the 2018 television series Bluey
- Queens (Indian TV series), a 2026 Indian revenge drama series

=== Other ===
- Queens (novel), a 1984 novel by Stephen Pickles
- The Queens, the third novel in a planned trilogy in the Ender's Game series
- Queen's Theatre (disambiguation)

== Places ==
- Queens, West Virginia, U.S.
- Queens (electoral district), the name of several Canadian districts
- Queens County (disambiguation)
- Region of Queens Municipality, Nova Scotia, Canada
- Queen's Island, Belfast, Northern Ireland

== Sport ==
- Los Angeles Queens, an upcoming Women's Pro Baseball League team
- Queen's Club, a private sporting club in London, England
  - Queen's Club Championships, annual tennis tournament
- Queens Royals, the athletic program of Queens University of Charlotte
- The Queens (golf), a women's professional team golf tournament held in Japan
- Queen of the South Football Club, a football club in Dumfries, Scotland, colloquially known as Queens
- Queen's Island F.C., a defunct football club from Queen's Island, Belfast
- Queen's Island F.C. (1881), a defunct football club from Queen's Island, Belfast

== Universities ==
- Queen's University Belfast, Northern Ireland
- Queen's University at Kingston, Ontario, Canada
- Queens University of Charlotte, North Carolina, United States
- Queen's College (disambiguation)
- Queen's campus (disambiguation)

== Other uses ==
- Queen's Royal Regiment (West Surrey), an infantry regiment of the English and British Army 1661–1959
  - Queen's Royal Surrey Regiment 1959–1966
  - Queen's Regiment 1966-1992
- Queen's Hospital, Romford, London, England
- The Queen's Medical Center, Honolulu, Hawaii, U.S.
- Queen's School (disambiguation)
- Queens Liberation Front, founded as Queens, an American transvestite rights group in the 1970s
- Queens (cocktail), a martini variant cocktail named after the borough
- The Queens, Crouch End, a grade II* listed public house and former hotel in Crouch End, north London

== See also ==
- Queen (disambiguation)
- Queening (disambiguation)
- Queens Plaza (disambiguation)
- Queen of the South (disambiguation)
- Kween (disambiguation)
