= Queen's School =

Queen's School may refer to:

- The Queen's School, Chester, England
- Queen's School, Ibadan, Nigeria
- Queen's School, Jamaica
- Queen's School, North Adelaide, South Australia

== See also ==
- Queen's College (disambiguation)
- Queens' School, Bushey, Hertfordshire, England
- Queen Elizabeth School (disambiguation)
- Queen's University (disambiguation)
- Queen's University at Kingston, Ontario, Canada
  - Queen's School of Environmental Studies
  - Queen's School of Kinesiology and Health Studies
  - Queen's School of Medicine
  - Queen's School of Music
  - Queen's School of Religion
  - Queen's School of Urban and Regional Planning
- Queen's Gate School, London, England
- Queen's High School, Dunedin, New Zealand
- Queen's Park High School, Chester, England
- Queens Paideia School Long Island City, Queens, New York, United States
