= Rex (automobile) =

Defunct American motor vehicle manufacturer

Rex Motor Company
- Industry: Automotive
- Founded: 1914; 112 years ago
- Founder: C. H. Blomstrom
- Defunct: 1915; 111 years ago
- Fate: Closed
- Headquarters: Detroit, Michigan, United States
- Products: Cyclecars

The Brass Era Rex cyclecar was manufactured by the Rex Motor Company in Detroit, Michigan in 1914.

== History ==
C. H. Blomstrom had been involved with the Queen, Blomstrom, Gyroscope, Car De Luxe and the Lion when he turned to developing a cyclecar. Unusual for cyclecars, the Rex had front-wheel drive. The friction transmission had its discs at the front of the engine instead of the rear. The water-cooled four-cylinder 18-hp engine of the Rex was designed by Blomstrom. The car was on a 100-inch wheelbase, with a 48-inch tread. A side-by-side two-seater, the Rex weighed 580 pounds and was priced at $395, equivalent to $12,696 in 2025. Very few were made.
