= North queen =

North queen or variation, may refer to:

== Ships ==
- SS North Queen, a freighter launched in 1944 and wrecked in 1961, also called Melville Jacoby, Dominator
- North Queen (1908), a ship built in 1908; see List of ships built by Hall, Russell & Company (401-500)

== Other uses ==
- North Queen (Myanmar), a Burmese title; see List of Burmese royal consorts
- North Queen (horse), a racehorse and winner of the 2005 Baden Racing Stuten-Preis

== See also ==
- North (disambiguation)
- Queen (disambiguation)
- Northern queen (disambiguation)
- Queen of the North (disambiguation)
