= Northern queen =

Northern queen or variation may refer to:

== Horses ==
- Northern Queen (foaled 1962), a Canadian racehorse
- Northern Queen (foaled 1974), an Irish racehorse; granddam of Prize Lady
- Northern Queen, an Australian racehorse; see Australian Champion Racehorse of the Year

== Ships and boats ==
- SS Northern Queen, a steamer built in 1889 and sunk in 1913;
- Northern Queen, a British ship that sank in 1856

=== Fictional ships and boats ===
- Northern Queen, a fictional houseboat from Mandy (comics)

== See also ==
- "Northern Queen of Soul", singer Gloria Jones
- Northern (disambiguation)
- Queen (disambiguation)
- North queen (disambiguation)
- Queen of the North (disambiguation)
