= Queen (ship) =

Queen may refer to the following:

- HMS Queen Several ships of the English navy and Royal Navy
- Queen (1225 ship), Henry III's great ship of 250 tons and no guns
- Queen (East Indiaman), five ships that sailed for the British East India Company between about 1701 and about 1802.
- Queen (1773 ship), transported convicts as part of the third fleet.
- Queen (1795 ship) was launched at Quebec in 1795. She made three voyages for the British East India Company (EIC) and then became a West Indiaman, trading between London and West Indies. She was last listed in 1813.
- Queen (1839 ship) was a steamship built by Pitcher, Northfleet. She was sold for breaking up in 1858.
- Queen (1858 ship) was a paddle steamer built by Andrew Leslie & Co, Hebburn.

== See also ==
- Queen (disambiguation)
