= Queen's Theatre =

Queen's Theatre or Queen's Theater may refer to:

== United Kingdom ==
=== Existing theatres ===
- Sondheim Theatre, formerly the Queen's Theatre prior to 2020, a West End theatre in Shaftesbury Avenue, London
- Queen's Theatre, Hornchurch, London
- Queen's Theatre, Barnstaple, Devon
- His Majesty's Theatre, London, founded as the Queen's Theatre in 1705, also known as Queen's Theatre at the Haymarket
- Scala Theatre, London, known at times in the 1800s as the Queen's Theatre

=== Defunct theatres ===
- Queen's Theatre, Long Acre, London, 1867–1878
- Dorset Garden Theatre, London, built in 1671, later the Queen's Theatre
- Queen's Theatre, Longton, Staffordshire, built in 1896, later the Empire Theatre, Longton
- Queen's Theatre, Burslem, Stoke-on-Trent, England
- Queens Theatre, Glasgow, Scotland

== Other countries ==
- Queen's Theatre, Adelaide, Australia, 1840–1842, reopened 1996
- Queen's Theatre, Melbourne, Australia
- Nostalgic Queen's Theatre, Wallumbilla, Queensland, Australia, opened 1939
- Queens Theatre (New York City), U.S.
- Queen's Theatre, Hong Kong
- Queen's Theatre, Dublin, Ireland, 1844–1969
- Queen's Theater (Liberia)
- Queen's Theatre, Singapore 1930–1982
- Théâtre de la Reine, the Palace of Versailles, France

== See also ==
- Queen's Hall in London, destroyed in the Blitz
- Queen's Hall (disambiguation), other theatres with that name
