= Queen (East Indiaman) =

At least six ships with the name Queen served the Honourable East India Company between 1701 and 1839. Most were East Indiamen:

- Queen (c.1703 EIC ship), 320 tons burthen (bm), 64 crew and 26 guns; the French captured her at Saint Helena on 1 June 1706. She was on the homeward leg of her second voyage; George Cornwall, her captain, was killed in the action.
- Queen (1714 EIC ship), a ship of 330 tons (bm), 18-22 guns and 60-66 crew, made two voyages to Bombay or Bencoolen between 1715 and 1720. She had been launched on the River Thames for Sir Joseph Martin. She was sold in 1720 into the West Indies and Levant trades.
- Queen (1767 EIC ship), of 499, 804, or 8217/94 tons (bm), was launched by Randall, Rotherhithe, on 24 October 1767. She made five trips to India or China for the company between 1768 and 1784, and was present at the Battle of Porto Praya. She was sold in 1784 for breaking up.
- Queen (1785 ship) made four trips to India or China between 1786 and 1800, and on her fifth trip was lost to fire at Salvador, Bahia in 1800.
- Queen (1795 ship) was launched at Quebec and between 1797 and 1801 made three voyages for the EIC. She then became a West Indiaman. She was last listed in 1813.

Bombay Marine

- Queen was a ketch of 14 guns, launched in 1768 at Bombay Dockyard for the Bombay Marine

== See also ==
- HMS Queen
- Queen (ship)
