= Queen of the North =

Queen of the north or variation, may refer to:

== Ships and boats ==
- MV Queen of the North, a RO-RO ferry launched in 1969 and sank in 2006, operated by BC Ferries, formerly Stena Danica
- Queen of the North (steamship), a steam ferry launched in 1929, also called Princess Norah, Canadian Prince, Beachcomber

== Stage, film, television ==
- Margrete: Queen of the North, a 2021 Danish film
- "Queen of the North" (Canada's Drag Race), a 2021 episode of Canada's Drag Race

== Other uses ==
- Bev Craig, Mayor of Greater Manchester

== See also ==
- "Queen of the North Atlantic", the schooner Bluenose
- "Lonely Queen of the North", the battleship Tirpitz
- North (disambiguation)
- Queen (disambiguation)
- North queen (disambiguation)
- Northern queen (disambiguation)
