= Queen (American automobile) =

Defunct American motor vehicle manufacturer

C. H. Blomstrom Motor Company
- Industry: Automotive
- Predecessor: Blomstrom automobile
- Founded: 1904; 122 years ago
- Founder: Carl H. Blomstrom
- Defunct: 1907; 119 years ago
- Fate: Merger with Car de Luxe
- Successor: Blomstrom Manufacturing Company
- Headquarters: Detroit, Michigan, United States
- Key people: C. H. Blomstrom
- Products: Vehicles; Automotive parts
- Production output: 1,500 approx. (1904-1904)

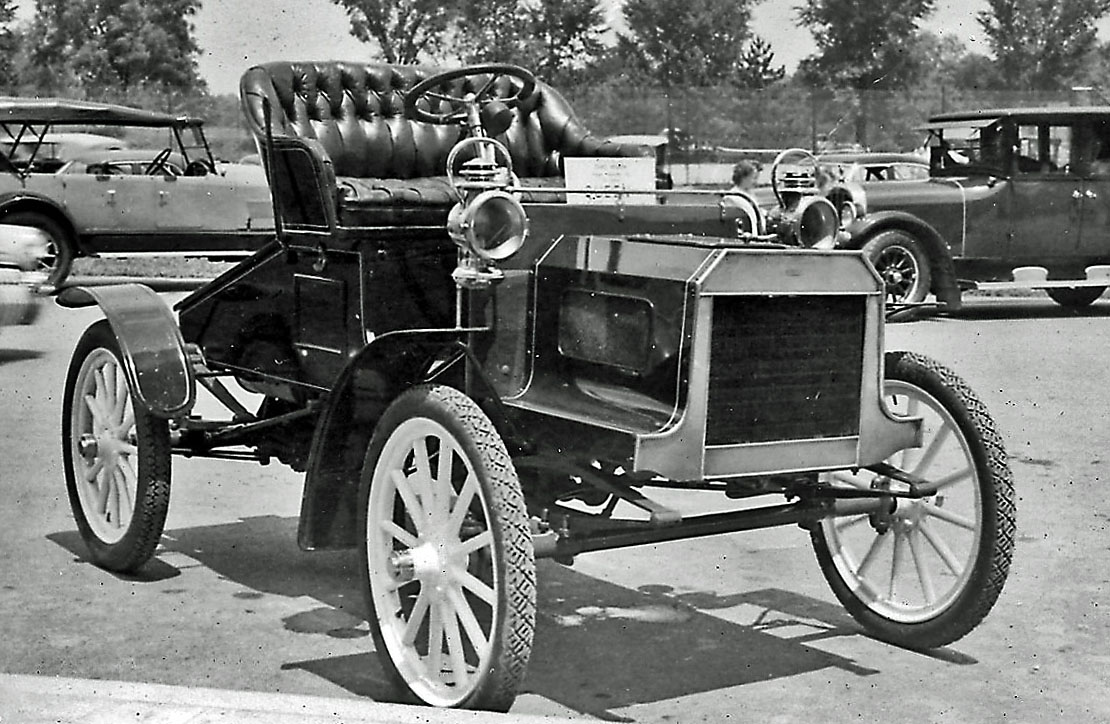
1904 Queen Runabout

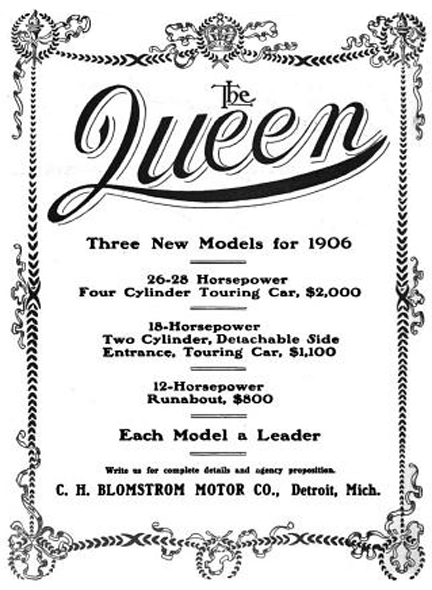
C. H. Blomstrom Motor Co. of Detroit, Michigan - The Queen - 1906

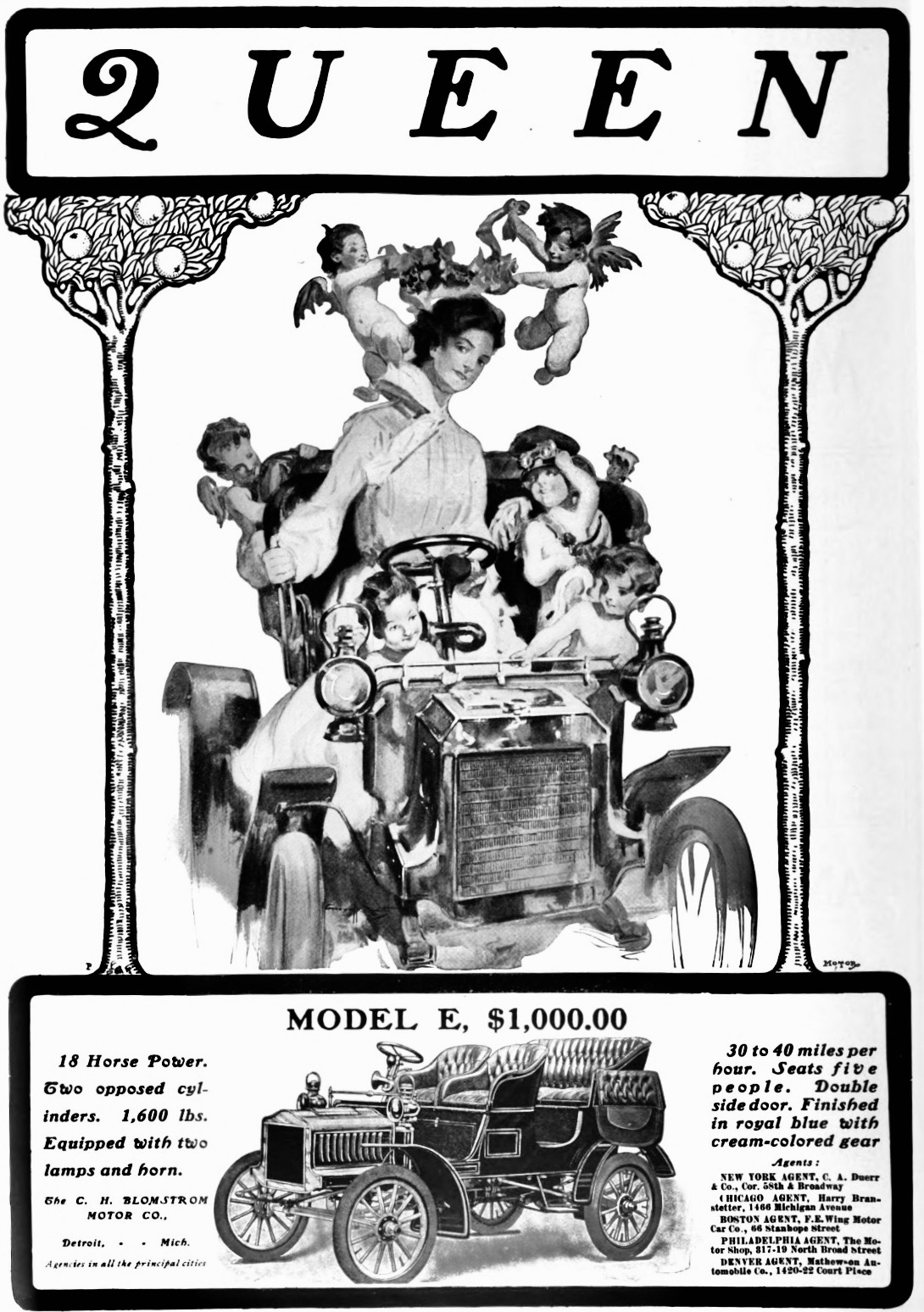
Queen Model E 18 hp (1905)

The Queen was a Brass Era American automobile manufactured between 1904 and 1907 in Detroit, Michigan.

== History ==
Carl H. Blomstrom was an engineer who built his first experimental car in 1897 and a second one in 1899.

=== Blomstrom (1902-1903) ===
Blomstrom became a manufacturer in 1902 of a small single-cylinder runabout. By the end of 1903 he had built 25 of these Blomstrom cars that would become the basis for the Queen introduced in 1904.

=== Queen (1904-1907) ===
In 1904 the C.H. Blomstrom Motor Company was established and Blomstrom renamed his car the Queen. The Queen began as a runabout with a one-cylinder engine developing an impressive 8-hp. A double-opposed engine was also available and a four-cylinder was added for 1905 when the one-cylinder was dropped. During the summer of 1906 the firm was in trouble with the authorities, charged with having been “defectively incorporated."

The 1906 Queen was available as a 14-hp and 18-hp twin or as a 28-hp four. The Model K 4-cylinder was priced at $2,000, equivalent to $71,667 in 2025. The two-cylinder models were priced at $800 and $1,100, equivalent to $39,417 in 2025.

Blomstrom's legal issue was resolved when Car De Luxe negotiated a merger with his firm. The Queen became the Car De Luxe for 1908. Total production of his Queen has been estimated as 1,500 units.

=== Blomstrom (1907-1908) ===
In 1907, after the merger of the Queen, the Blomstrom Manufacturing Company was set-up across town in a new factory. His new Blomstrom 30 was a 4-cylinder with a 110-inch wheelbase. Larger than the previous Queen, it was little changed for 1908 when production was being planned at 200 units. The Blomstrom was described in the press as "the last thing in motor car design throughout”. In 1908 Carl Blomstrom was developing the Gyroscope car which was nearing production and discontinued the Blomstrom.

Carl H. Blomstrom was responsible for no fewer than five different cars: the Queen, the Gyroscope, the Rex cyclecar, the Frontmobile and the Blomstrom.

== See also ==
- Queen automobiles at ConceptCarz
