= Kween =

Kween or Kweens may refer to:

== People ==
- Khuen people, or Kween people, an aboriginal ethnic group of Laos
- Kenny Kweens, an American musician

== Places ==
- Kween District, Eastern Region, Uganda
  - Kween County, a county of Uganda
  - Kween, Uganda, a town in the county of Kween, on the Kapchorwa–Suam Road

== Other uses ==
- Kween, a fictional character in the film Nerve

== See also ==
- Queen (disambiguation)
- Queens (disambiguation)
- Kweens Foundation, founded by Young M.A
