= Queen's (electoral district) =

There have been several electoral districts in Canada named Queen's or Queens.

== Federal ==
- Queen's (New Brunswick federal electoral district), which returned members to the Canadian House of Commons from 1867–1892
- Queens (Nova Scotia federal electoral district), which returned members to the House of Commons from 1867–1892
- Queen's (Prince Edward Island federal electoral district), which returned members to the House of Commons from 1903–1966

== Provincial ==
- Queens (Nova Scotia provincial electoral district), which has existed since 1941
- Queens (New Brunswick provincial electoral district), in use from 1785 to 1974 in the province of New Brunswick
- Queen's (Prince Edward Island provincial electoral district), which returned members to the Legislative Assembly of Prince Edward Island from 1903–1966

== See also ==
- Queen's County (electoral district), a Prince Edward Island electoral district which returned members to the House of Commons from 1873–1892
- Queens (disambiguation) for other places named "Queens" or "Queen's"
