= The Queen =

The Queen or Her Majesty The Queen may refer to:

- Queen regnant, a female monarch of a kingdom
  - Elizabeth II (1926–2022), Queen of the United Kingdom and other Commonwealth realms (r. 1952–2022)
  - List of female monarchs
- a specific queen consort, the wife of a reigning king
  - Queen Camilla (born 1947), Queen consort of the United Kingdom and other Commonwealth realms since 2022
  - List of current consorts of sovereigns

== Arts, entertainment and media ==
=== Film and television ===
- The Queen (1968 film), a documentary about drag queens
- The Queen (2006 film), a British drama about Elizabeth II
- The Queen (2012 film), an Iranian film
- The Queen (British TV serial), a 2009 drama-documentary about Elizabeth II
- The Queen (Singaporean TV series), 2016
- The Queen (South African TV series), 2016

=== Music ===
- The Queen (Velvet album), 2009
- The Queen Album, by Elaine Paige, 1988
- "The Queen" (Velvet song), 2009

=== Other uses in arts, entertainment and media ===
- The Queen: The Ladies Newspaper and Court Chronicle, launched in London in 1864
- The Queen (play), published anonymously in 1653
- Her Majesty the Queen (Miró), a sculpture object by Joan Miró
- Bomb Queen, also known as The Queen, a fictional character created by Jimmie Robinson

== Other uses ==
- The Queen, the name of a GWR 3031 Class locomotive
- TSS The Queen, an English Channel passenger ferry 1903–1916

== See also ==
- Queen (disambiguation)
- Rani (disambiguation)
- Style of the British sovereign
- Evil Queen, the antagonist of the 19th-century fairy tale Snow White
  - Evil Queen (Disney), the antagonist of the Disney film Snow White and the Seven Dwarfs
