= Queen B =

Queen B may refer to:

== People ==
- Queen Bee, a nickname given in the 1990's to former Junior Mafia member, Lil Kim
- Queen B/Bey/Bee, a nickname for Beyoncé
- Queen B, a nickname for the former queen Beatrix of the Netherlands
- Queen B, a nickname for South African TV and Radio personality Bonang Matheba
- Queen B, a nickname for Blair Waldorf in Gossip Girl

== Entertainment ==
=== Music ===
- "Queen B.", a 2007 song by Puscifer

=== Television ===
- Queen B, a 2005 TV movie starring Alicia Silverstone
- "Queen B.", an episode of Popular
- "Queen B." (Arrested Development), an episode of Arrested Development

== See also ==
- Queen bee (disambiguation)
