= Queen's campus =

Queen's or Queens campus may refer to:

- Queen's Campus, Durham University in Stockton-on-Tees, England
- Queens Campus, Rutgers University in New Brunswick, New Jersey
- Queens Campus, St. John's University in Queens, New York
- The main campus of Queen's University at Kingston in Kingston, Canada
- The campus of Queen's University Belfast in Belfast, Northern Ireland
- The campus of Queens University of Charlotte in Charlotte, North Carolina

== See also ==
- Queen's College (disambiguation) (including Queens' and Queens)
- Queen's University (disambiguation) (including Queens)
- Queens (disambiguation) (including Queen's)
