= Queens County =

Queens County or Queen's County may refer to:

== Canada ==
- Queens County, New Brunswick
- Queens County, Nova Scotia
- Queens County, Prince Edward Island
  - Former Queen's County (electoral district)

== Ireland ==
- Queen's County, former name of County Laois

== United States ==
- Queens County, New York, coterminous with the New York borough of Queens

== See also ==
- Queens (disambiguation) for other things named "Queens" or "Queen's"
