= HMS Garland (1800) =

Privateer ship

History

France
- Name: Mars
- Builder: Bordeaux
- Launched: 1798, or 1799,
- Captured: 31 March 1800

Great Britain
- Name: HMS Garland
- Acquired: 31 March 1800 by capture
- Commissioned: September 1800
- Fate: Wrecked 10 November 1803

General characteristics
- Type: Sixth-rate post ship
- Tons burthen: 52911/94 (bm)
- Length: 124 ft 4 in (37.9 m) (overall); 100 ft 4 5/8 in (30.6 m) (keel)
- Beam: 31 ft 5 3/4 in (9.6 m)
- Depth of hold: 14 ft 1 in (4.3 m)
- Sail plan: Full-rigged ship
- Complement: Privateer:180; HMS:135
- Armament: Privateer:20 × 12-pounder guns + 2 × 36-pounder carronades; HMS:22 × 32-pounder carronades + 2 × 9-pounder bow chasers

HMS Garland was the French privateer Mars, launched in 1798 that Amethyst captured in 1800. The Royal Navy took her into service and sent her out to the Jamaica Station. There she had a brief, eventful career before she was wrecked in 1803.

== Origins and capture ==
Mars was one of the many corvettes built in Bordeaux for privateer warfare. She was commissioned circa 1798 under Captain Estrenne. Though pierced for 24 cannon, she carried 22.

Mars captured Active, Clark, master, on 17 February 1800. Active had been sailing from Chepstow to Portsmouth. On 4 March Amethyst recaptured Active. After her recapture Active came into Bearhaven.

On 11 March Mars captured the merchant ship Perseverance as Perseverance was sailing from Baltimore to London. However, HMS Nereide recaptured Perseverance and sent her into Plymouth. Nereide had recaptured the American ship Perseverance, of Baltimore, on 3 March. She was carrying a cargo valued at £30,000.

Late on 31 March Amethyst, with Nymphe, captured Mars. Mars was armed with twenty 12-pounder guns and two 36-pounder carronades, and carried a crew of 180 men. She had taken several prizes and was returning to port when Nymphe captured her. Captain John Cooke described Mars as being "one of the finest Privateers fitted out of Bourdeaux." The British took Mars into service as Garland, there being a Mars in service, and a Garland having been wrecked in 1798, freeing the name.

== Career ==
Garland was commissioned in September 1800 under the command of Commander John Acworth Ommanney. This was a temporary appointment that Earl Spencer arranged for him while he was convalescing from an illness. On 16 October Spencer sent Ommanney a commission as post captain. Captain Robert Honyman replaced Ommanney that month, for the Channel.

Garland shared in the recapture, on 3 April 1801, with Renard and Suffisante, of the brig Swan . Also, on 6 April, Garland brought into Portsmouth a French brig with a cargo of wheat.

Then on 21 June Honyman and Garland conveyed Admiral Robert Montagu to Jamaica. Garland was also acting as escort to a group of merchantmen bound for the West indies, Queen among them.

At Jamaica Honyman transferred to Topaze, which he sailed back to England, returning on 12 October 1801. Captain James Carhew replaced Honyman on Garland.

On 27 January 1803 Captain John Sorrel, late of Echo, was made post captain into Garland. His replacement, in May 1803 or so, was Captain Frederick Cotterell.

== Loss ==
On 10 November 1803, Garland was cruising with a squadron off the northern coast of Santo Domingo. Sent to investigate a strange sail, she made little headway in the light winds. Towards evening, a current caught her close to shore and she grounded on the Caracole reef off Cap François. Despite efforts to lighten her, she took on water and fell on her side. The other vessels of the squadron came to her aid and took off her crew and such stores and provisions as could be saved. On 11 November, the day after she grounded, her crew set her on fire, which destroyed her.
