= Queenie =

Queenie may refer to:

== Arts and entertainment ==
- Queenie (film), a 1921 American silent drama film
- Queenie (Melbourne elephant), an elephant at Melbourne Zoo
- Queenie (waterskiing elephant)
- Queenie, a 1985 novel by Michael Korda
  - Queenie (miniseries), a 1987 ABC miniseries based on the Korda novel
- Queenie (Wilson novel), a 2013 children's novel by Jacqueline Wilson
- Queenie (Carty-Williams novel), a 2019 novel by Candice Carty-Williams
  - Queenie (TV series), a Channel 4 television series based on the Carty-Williams novel
- "Queenie", a song by Irving Berlin
- "Queenie", a song by Status Quo from the album Thirsty Work

== Other uses ==
- Queenie (name), including a list of people, animals and characters with the name
- Queenie, the Manx term for a Queen scallop

== See also ==
- Queen (disambiguation)
- Typhoon Queenie (disambiguation), two typhoons
- "Little Queenie", a 1959 song by Chuck Berry
- "50ft Queenie", a 1993 song by PJ Harvey
- Queenie of Hollywood, a 1931 film
- Queenie, Queenie, who's got the ball?, a game
