= Queens Plaza =

Queens Plaza may refer to:

- Queens Plaza (Queens) in Queens, New York, U.S.
  - Queens Plaza (IND Queens Boulevard Line), an underground station
- QueensPlaza, a shopping centre in Brisbane, Queensland, Australia

== See also ==
- Queensboro Plaza (New York City Subway), an elevated station at Queens Plaza in New York City
- Queensboro Bridge, the bridge between Manhattan and Queens which feeds into Queens Plaza in New York City
- Queens (disambiguation) for other places named "Queens" or "Queen's"
