= Queen's University =

Queen's or Queens University may refer to:

- Queen's University at Kingston, Ontario, Canada
- Queen's University Belfast, Northern Ireland, UK
  - Queen's University of Belfast (UK Parliament constituency) (1918–1950)
  - Queen's University of Belfast (Northern Ireland Parliament constituency) (1921–1969)
  - Queen's University Belfast A.F.C.
- Queen's University of Ireland (1850–1882)
- Queens University of Charlotte, North Carolina, United States
- Queens University (Bangladesh) in Dhaka

== See also ==
- Queen's College (disambiguation)
- Queen's campus (disambiguation)
- Queens (disambiguation) (including "Queen's")
