= Queen bee (disambiguation) =

A queen bee is the matriarch of a honey bee colony.

Queen bee or Queen B may also refer to:

== People ==
- Lil' Kim (born 1974), nicknamed Queen B/Bee
- Beyoncé (born 1981), nicknamed Queen B/Bey

== Music ==
- Queen Bee & The Blue Hornet Band, an American blues group with Tonya Browne (the Queen Bee) as frontwoman
- Queen Bee (band), a Japanese musical group
- Queen Bee Entertainment, a record label
- Queen Bee (EP), 2014 EP by Little Ghost
- "Queen Bee", a 1981 song by Grand Funk Railroad on the album Grand Funk Lives
- "Queen Bee", a 2014 single by Tina Guo
- "Queen Bee," a song by actor Johnny Flynn for the 2020 film Emma
- "Queen Bee", a song by John Lee Hooker
- "Queen Bee", a song by singer Rochelle Diamante
- "Queen Bee", a song by singer Sylvia (1977)
- Queen Bees, a Norwegian musical group made of up of Rita Eriksen, Anita Skorgan and Hilde Heltberg
- "The Queen Bees", a Bluegrass group featuring Aundrea Ware, Joey Ball, Suzanne Nadeau-Porter, Pam Rosenthal and Portia Rodgers

== TV and film ==
- Queen Bee (1955 film), an American film starring Joan Crawford
- The Queen Bee (女王蜂 Neoiwongfung), a 1974 Hong Kong film produced by Golden Harvest
- Queen Bee (1978 film), a 1978 Japanese starring Kōji Ishizaka
- Queen Bees (TV series), a 2008 reality series that aired on The N
- Queen Bees (film), a 2021 American film starring Ellen Burstyn and James Caan
- "Queen Bee", a 2023 special episode of Helluva Boss
  - Queen Bee-lzebub, a reoccurring Helluva Boss character

== Literature ==
- Queen Bee (女王蜂, Joōbachi), a 1951–1952 novel by Seishi Yokomizo in the Kōsuke Kindaichi series
- Queen Bee (comics), the name of four different DC Comics supervillains
- Queen Bee (graphic novel), by Chynna Clugston
- Queen Bee (newspaper), newspaper founded by Caroline Nichols Churchill in 1882
- "The Queen Bee (Garrett story)", a science fiction story by Randall Garrett
- The Queen Bee, a fairy tale

== Transportation ==
- Queen Bee (aircraft), an unmanned aircraft used in World War II
- Queen Bee (ship), an 1852 barque that ran aground on Farewell Spit, New Zealand in 1877
- Queen Bee (steamer) a 1907 steam collier that sunk off Barrenjoey lighthouse Australia in 1922

== Other uses ==
- Queen bee (sociology), a term in cliques and social groups
- Queen Bee Copper Mine, a former mine. at Illewong, New South Wales

== See also ==
- Queen bee syndrome, in which women discriminate against female subordinates
- Q-Bee, a character from the Darkstalkers video game series
- Queen B (disambiguation)
