= Queen's Hall (disambiguation) =

Queen's Hall was a concert hall in London, destroyed in World War II.

Queen's Hall may also refer to:

== Australia ==
- Queen's Hall, Adelaide, South Australia, a former theatre
- Queen's Hall, Melbourne, Victoria, a former theatre (1920–1937)

== United Kingdom ==
- Queen's Hall, Dunoon, Scotland
- Queen's Hall, Edinburgh, Scotland
- Queen's Hall, Hexham, Northumberland, England, now an arts centre
- Queens Hall, Leeds, England (1961–1989)
- Queen's Hall, Minehead, Somerset, England
