= Queen's School of Urban and Regional Planning =

University unit in Kingston, Canada

School of Urban and Regional Planning
- Type: Faculty School
- Established: 1970
- Affiliations: Queen's University at Kingston
- Dean: Ajay Agarwal
- Location: Kingston, Ontario, Canada
- Website: www.queensu.ca/surp

The Queen's School of Urban and Regional Planning (SURP) is a unit of the School of Graduate Studies and Research at Queen's University at Kingston in Kingston, Ontario, Canada.

Besides offering a two-year Master of Planning (M.PL.) program to students at a low student-to-faculty ratio, SURP also maintains extensive formal connections with all levels of government as well as crown corporations through its close affiliation with the National Executive Forum on Public Property. The school is the "implementing agent" of the Memorandum of Understanding between Queen's University and the Ministry of Land and Resources of the People's Republic of China. A variety of activities have been organized for the Chinese mineral and land administration officials since 1996. SURP also hosts the Queen's University's Executive Seminars on Corporate and Investment Real Estate for real estate professionals.
