= Lion (automobile) =

Defunct American motor vehicle manufacturer

Lion Motor Car Company
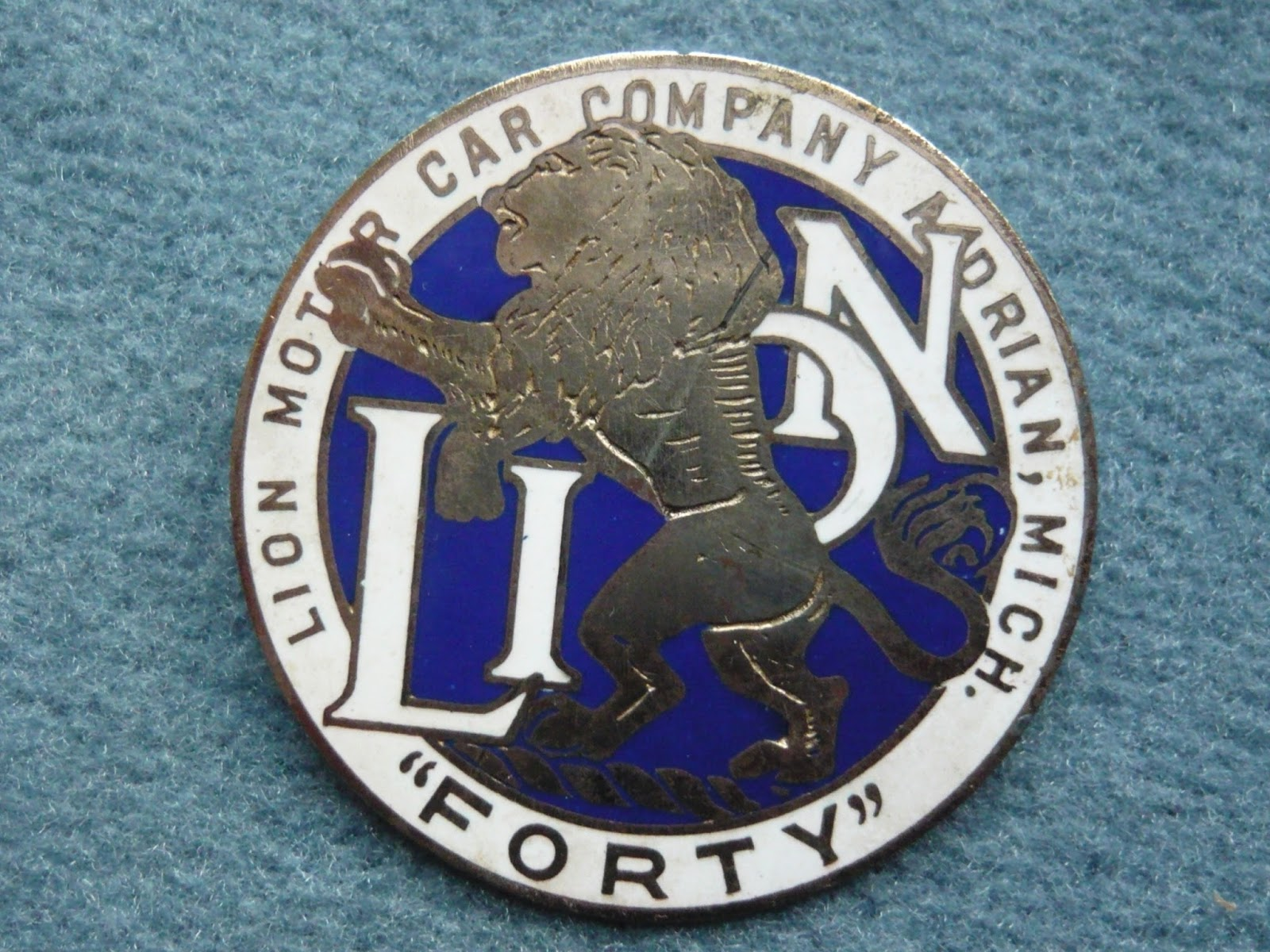
- Lion Radiator Emblem
- Predecessor: Gyroscope (automobile)
- Founded: 1910; 116 years ago
- Founder: Henry Bowen, Fred Postal
- Defunct: 1912; 114 years ago
- Fate: Factory Fire
- Headquarters: Adrian, Michigan
- Products: Automobile Manufacturer

The Lion was a brass era automobile built in Adrian, Michigan, United States by the Lion Motor Car Company from 1909 to 1912.

== History ==
The Lion Motor Car Company was formed to produce the engine developed for the Gyroscope automobile. This plan was abandoned and the Lion was a four-cylinder 40 hp engine model called the Forty. In 1910 Runabout and Tourers were medium-priced at $1,500 and $1,600, equivalent to $55,286 in 2025. Lion advertised " The Lion Forty runs like a Sixty".

A fire on June 2, 1912, destroyed the factory and 150 cars, including a prototype model Thirty. The city of Adrian and citizens raised $8,000 to help, but the Lion Motor Car Company was under-insured and went into receivership by October.

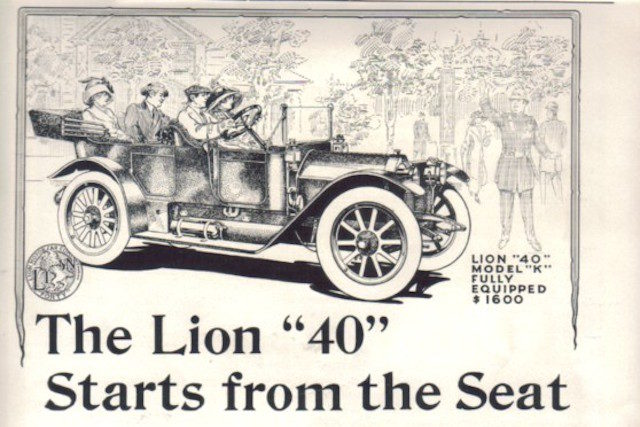
Lion model Forty advertising

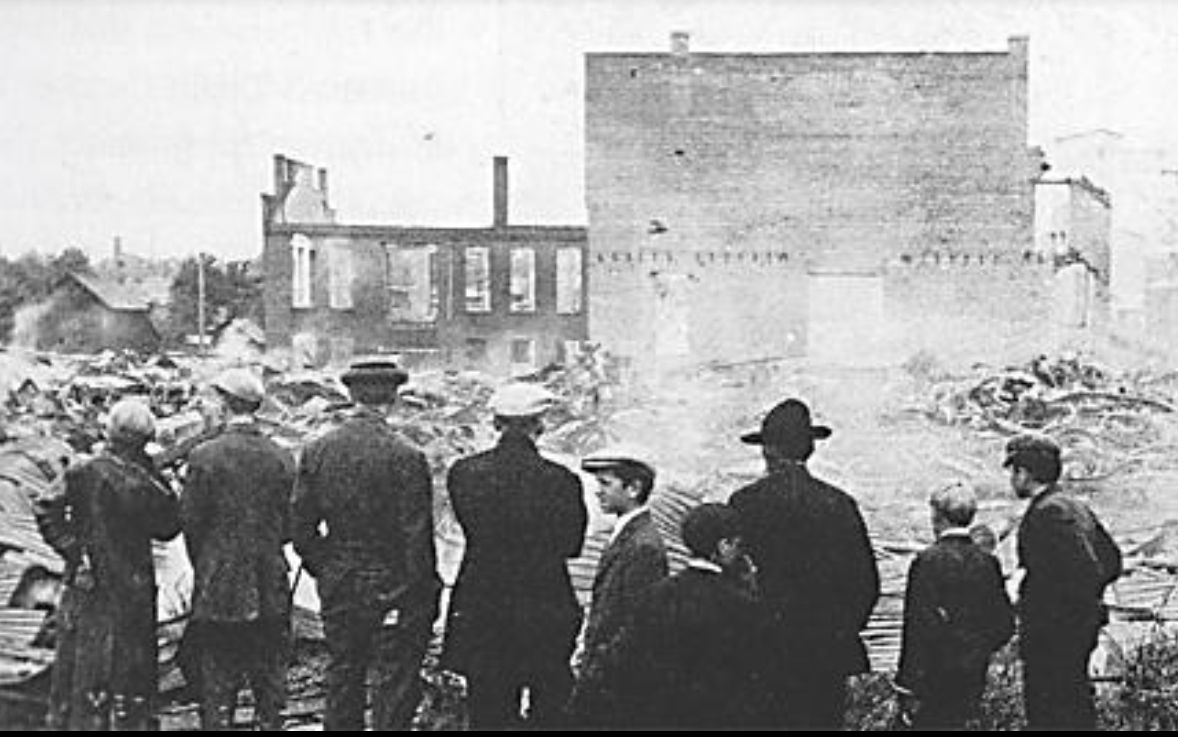
1912 Lion factory fire

Two Lion examples are known to be extant; one in a museum in Adrian, Michigan and another in Australia. The Australian car is located in Queensland.
