= List of ships built by Hall, Russell & Company (401–500) =

List of ships built by Aberdeen shipbuilders Hall, Russell & Company, from yard number 401 to 500.

The ships built in the sequence 401 to 500 cover the period 1906 to 1911. The majority of vessels built during this period were trawlers built for the British fishing industry.

List of Hall, Russell & Company built ships (401–500)
Name	Image	Yard Number	Construction	Type	Year	Length Overall	Breadth	Depth	Tonnage	Ref(s)
W. Wetherly		401		Trawler - Steam	1906	120 feet 4 inches (36.68 m)	23 feet 1 inch (7.04 m)	13 feet (4.0 m)	234 long tons (238 t)	
Rainbow		402	Steel	Trawler - Steam	1906	105 feet 6 inches (32.16 m)	21 feet 1 inch (6.43 m)	11 feet 5 inches (3.48 m)	176 long tons (179 t)	
North King		403	Steel	Trawler - Steam	1906	115 feet 3 inches (35.13 m)	21 feet 6 inches (6.55 m)	11 feet 6 inches (3.51 m)	194 long tons (197 t)	
North Queen		404	Steel	Trawler - Steam	1906	115 feet 4 inches (35.15 m)	21 feet 6 inches (6.55 m)	11 feet 6 inches (3.51 m)	195 long tons (198 t)	
Strathbeg		405	Steel	Trawler - Steam	1906	112 feet 9 inches (34.37 m)	21 feet 10 inches (6.65 m)	12 feet 7 inches (3.84 m)	202 long tons (205 t)	
Strathspey		406	Steel	Trawler - Steam	1906	113 feet (34 m)	21 feet 9 inches (6.63 m)	11 feet 7 inches (3.53 m)	202 long tons (205 t)	
Comrade		407	Steel	Trawler - Steam	1906	112 feet 4 inches (34.24 m)	21 feet 1 inch (6.43 m)	11 feet 1 inch (3.38 m)	161 long tons (164 t)	
Candidate		408	Steel	Trawler - Steam	1906	112 feet 4 inches (34.24 m)	21 feet 1 inch (6.43 m)	11 feet 1 inch (3.38 m)	161 long tons (164 t)	
Caledonia		409		Trawler - Steam	1906	112 feet 4 inches (34.24 m)	21 feet 1 inch (6.43 m)	12 feet (3.7 m)	161 long tons (164 t)	
Strathavon		410	Steel	Trawler - Steam	1906	113 feet (34 m)	21 feet 9 inches (6.63 m)	11 feet 7 inches (3.53 m)	202 long tons (205 t)	
Strathgarry		411		Trawler - Steam	1906	112 feet 9 inches (34.37 m)	21 feet 10 inches (6.65 m)	12 feet 7 inches (3.84 m)	202 long tons (205 t)	
Briton		412		Trawler - Steam	1906	110 feet (34 m)	21 feet (6.4 m)	12 feet 7.5 inches (3.848 m)	196 long tons (199 t)	
Kernevel		413	Steel	Trawler - Steam	1906	112 feet 3 inches (34.21 m)	21 feet 6 inches (6.55 m)	11 feet 6 inches (3.51 m)	172 long tons (175 t)	
Stratheden		414	Steel	Trawler - Steam	1906	112 feet 6 inches (34.29 m)	21 feet 9 inches (6.63 m)	11 feet 7 inches (3.53 m)	201 long tons (204 t)	
Stratherrick		415	Steel	Trawler - Steam	1906	112 feet 5 inches (34.26 m)	21 feet 9 inches (6.63 m)	11 feet 7 inches (3.53 m)	201 long tons (204 t)	
Balmedie		416		Trawler - Steam	1906	115 feet (35 m)	21 feet 9 inches (6.63 m)	13 feet (4.0 m)	205 long tons (208 t)	
Ethel Nutten		417		Trawler - Steam	1906	110 feet 3 inches (33.60 m)	21 feet 10 inches (6.65 m)	12 feet 7 inches (3.84 m)	182 long tons (185 t)	
Rosskeen		418	Steel	Trawler - Steam	1907	115 feet 7 inches (35.23 m)	21 feet 7 inches (6.58 m)	11 feet 6 inches (3.51 m)	196 long tons (199 t)	
Jeannies		419	Steel	Drifter - Steam (Fishing)	1907	86 feet 2 inches (26.26 m)	18 feet 6 inches (5.64 m)	9 feet 1 inch (2.77 m)	100 long tons (100 t)	
Expert		420	Steel	Drifter - Steam (Fishing)	1907	86 feet 4 inches (26.31 m)	18 feet 6 inches (5.64 m)	9 feet 1 inch (2.77 m)	100 long tons (100 t)	
Peggy		421	Steel	Drifter - Steam (Fishing)	1907	86 feet 4 inches (26.31 m)	18 feet 6 inches (5.64 m)	9 feet 1 inch (2.77 m)	100 long tons (100 t)	
Guide Me II		422	Steel	Drifter - Steam (Fishing)	1907	86 feet 3 inches (26.29 m)	18 feet 7 inches (5.66 m)	9 feet 10 inches (3.00 m)	100 long tons (100 t)	
Gloria		423	Steel	Trawler - Steam	1907	115 feet 4 inches (35.15 m)	21 feet 7 inches (6.58 m)	11 feet 6 inches (3.51 m)	187 long tons (190 t)	
Rosebud		424	Steel	Drifter - Steam (Fishing)	1907	86 feet 4 inches (26.31 m)	18 feet 6 inches (5.64 m)	9 feet (2.7 m)	100 long tons (100 t)	
Uno		425	Steel	Trawler - Steam	1907	112 feet 4 inches (34.24 m)	21 feet 5 inches (6.53 m)	11 feet 7 inches (3.53 m)	185 long tons (188 t)	
Dos		426	Steel	Trawler - Steam	1907	112 feet 4 inches (34.24 m)	21 feet 7 inches (6.58 m)	12 feet 6 inches (3.81 m)	185 long tons (188 t)	
Oceanic		427	Steel	Drifter - Steam (Fishing)	1907	86 feet 3 inches (26.29 m)	18 feet 7 inches (5.66 m)	9 feet 10 inches (3.00 m)	99 long tons (101 t)	
Pitullie		428	Steel	Drifter - Steam (Fishing)	1907	86 feet 3 inches (26.29 m)	18 feet 7 inches (5.66 m)	9 feet 10 inches (3.00 m)	99 long tons (101 t)	
Enterprise		429	Steel	Drifter - Steam (Fishing)	1907	86 feet 3 inches (26.29 m)	18 feet 7 inches (5.66 m)	9 feet 10 inches (3.00 m)	99 long tons (101 t)	
Industry		430	Steel	Drifter - Steam (Fishing)	1907	86 feet 3 inches (26.29 m)	18 feet 7 inches (5.66 m)	9 feet 10 inches (3.00 m)	100 long tons (100 t)	
Chrysoprasus		431			1907	92 feet 3 inches (28.12 m)	19 feet 7 inches (5.97 m)	11 feet (3.4 m)	119 long tons (121 t)	
Dreadnought		432	Steel	'Fishing Purposes'	1907	103 feet 4 inches (31.50 m)	21 feet 2 inches (6.45 m)	10 feet 5 inches (3.18 m)	150 long tons (150 t)	
Swift		433	Steel	Drifter - Steam (Fishing)	1907	86 feet 6 inches (26.37 m)	16 feet 6 inches (5.03 m)	9 feet 1 inch (2.77 m)	101 long tons (103 t)	
Mary Wetherly		434	Steel	Trawler - Steam	1907	115 feet 5 inches (35.18 m)	22 feet 6 inches (6.86 m)	12 feet 1 inch (3.68 m)	221 long tons (225 t)	
Grace Wetherly		435	Steel	Trawler - Steam	1907	115 feet 7 inches (35.23 m)	22 feet 6 inches (6.86 m)	12 feet (3.7 m)	231 long tons (235 t)	
Loch Doon		436	Steel	Trawler - Steam	1907	112 feet 2 inches (34.19 m)	22 feet (6.7 m)	11 feet 6 inches (3.51 m)	198 long tons (201 t)	
Loch Kildonan		437	Steel	Trawler - Steam	1907	115 feet 4 inches (35.15 m)	22 feet 2 inches (6.76 m)	11 feet 6 inches (3.51 m)	211 long tons (214 t)	
Kimberley		438	Steel	Drifting - Steam (Fishing)	1907	86 feet 6 inches (26.37 m)	18 feet 6 inches (5.64 m)	9 feet 1 inch (2.77 m)	102 long tons (104 t)	
Ar-Men		439	Steel	Trawler - Steam	1907	105 feet 6 inches (32.16 m)	21 feet 2 inches (6.45 m)	11 feet 1 inch (3.38 m)	158 long tons (161 t)	
North Star		440	Steel	Trawler - Steam	1907	115 feet 2 inches (35.10 m)	21 feet 6 inches (6.55 m)	11 feet 5 inches (3.48 m)	188 long tons (191 t)	
Peggy Nutten		441	Steel	Trawler - Steam	1907	110 feet 5 inches (33.66 m)	21 feet 8 inches (6.60 m)	11 feet 7 inches (3.53 m)	193 long tons (196 t)	
Vale of Leven		442		Trawler - Steam	1907	115 feet 3 inches (35.13 m)	22 feet 7 inches (6.88 m)	11 feet 3 inches (3.43 m)	223 long tons (227 t)	
Scot		443	Steel	Trawler - Steam	1907	115 feet 2 inches (35.10 m)	22 feet (6.7 m)	12 feet 1 inch (3.68 m)	202 long tons (205 t)	
Strathlui		444	Steel	Trawler - Steam	1908	133 feet 2 inches (40.59 m)	22 feet (6.7 m)	11 feet 6 inches (3.51 m)	199 long tons (202 t)	
Strathalladale		445	Steel	Trawler - Steam	1908	113 feet 2 inches (34.49 m)	22 feet (6.7 m)	11 feet 6 inches (3.51 m)	199 long tons (202 t)	
Vale of Clyde		446	Steel	Trawler - Steam	1908	115 feet 5 inches (35.18 m)	22 feet 6 inches (6.86 m)	12 feet 1 inch (3.68 m)	223 long tons (227 t)	
Lass O' Doune		447	Steel	Drifter - Steam (Fishing)	1910	86 feet 1 inch (26.24 m)	18 feet 6 inches (5.64 m)	9 feet (2.7 m)	92 long tons (93 t)	
Loch Craig		448	Steel	Drifter - Steam (Fishing)	1910	86 feet 3 inches (26.29 m)	18 feet 7 inches (5.66 m)	9 feet 10 inches (3.00 m)	91 long tons (92 t)	
Tres		449		Trawler - Steam	1908	134 feet 4 inches (40.94 m)	23 feet 1 inch (7.04 m)	12 feet 6 inches (3.81 m)	270 long tons (270 t)	
Cuatro		450	Steel	Trawler - Steam	1908	134 feet 3 inches (40.92 m)	23 feet 1 inch (7.04 m)	11 feet 7 inches (3.53 m)	275 long tons (279 t)	
Bon-Accord		451	Steel	Trawler - Steam	1908	116 feet 1 inch (35.38 m)	22 feet 6 inches (6.86 m)	12 feet 2 inches (3.71 m)	214 long tons (217 t)	
Jessie Wetherly		452		Trawler - Steam	1908	115 feet 3 inches (35.13 m)	22 feet 7 inches (6.88 m)	13 feet (4.0 m)	215 long tons (218 t)	
The Brae		453	Steel	Drifter - Steam (Fishing)	1908	82 feet 2 inches (25.04 m)	18 feet 4 inches (5.59 m)	9 feet 3 inches (2.82 m)	77 long tons (78 t)	
Star of Bethlehem		454		Drifter - Steam (Fishing)	1908	82 feet 2 inches (25.04 m)	18 feet 4 inches (5.59 m)		77 long tons (78 t)	
Firth		455	Steel	Cargo - Collier (Coal)	1908	160 feet 5 inches (48.90 m)	25 feet 1 inch (7.65 m)	12 feet 6 inches (3.81 m)	405 long tons (411 t)	
Loch Esk		456		Trawler - Steam	1908	115 feet 3 inches (35.13 m)	22 feet 7 inches (6.88 m)	13 feet (4.0 m)	215 long tons (218 t)	
Dorothy Gray		457	Steel	Trawler - Steam	1908	115 feet 3 inches (35.13 m)	22 feet (6.7 m)	12 feet 3 inches (3.73 m)	199 long tons (202 t)	
Keryado		458		Trawler - Steam	1908	112 feet 3 inches (34.21 m)	21 feet 7 inches (6.58 m)	12 feet 6 inches (3.81 m)	175 long tons (178 t)	
Jessie Nutten		459		Trawler - Steam	1908	110 feet 3 inches (33.60 m)	21 feet 10 inches (6.65 m)	12 feet 7 inches (3.84 m)	187 long tons (190 t)	
Cinco		460		Trawler - Steam	1909	112 feet 3 inches (34.21 m)	21 feet 7 inches (6.58 m)	12 feet 6 inches (3.81 m)	181 long tons (184 t)	
Richard Irvin		461	Steel	Trawler - Steam	1909	112 feet 9 inches (34.37 m)	22 feet 1 inch (6.73 m)	11 feet 9 inches (3.58 m)	197 long tons (200 t)	
Vale of Lennox		462	Steel	Trawler - Steam	1909	120 feet 4 inches (36.68 m)	23 feet 1 inch (7.04 m)	11 feet 7 inches (3.53 m)	233 long tons (237 t)	
Fair Isle		463	Steel	Trawler - Steam	1909	112 feet 6 inches (34.29 m)	22 feet 1 inch (6.73 m)	11 feet 6 inches (3.51 m)	192 long tons (195 t)	
John E. Lewis		464		Trawler - Steam	1909	125 feet 4 inches (38.20 m)	23 feet 1 inch (7.04 m)	13 feet 6 inches (4.11 m)	254 long tons (258 t)	
Glen Tanar		465		Cargo Steamer	1909	195 feet 6 inches (59.59 m)	32 feet 1 inch (9.78 m)	14 feet (4.3 m)	819 long tons (832 t)	
Loch Awe		466	Steel	Trawler - Steam	1909	115 feet 7 inches (35.23 m)	22 feet 6 inches (6.86 m)	12 feet 2 inches (3.71 m)	216 long tons (219 t)	
Loch Shiel		467		Trawler - Steam	1909	115 feet 3 inches (35.13 m)	22 feet 7 inches (6.88 m)	13 feet (4.0 m)	216 long tons (219 t)	
John H. Irvin		468		Trawler - Steam	1909	112 feet 9 inches (34.37 m)	22 feet 1 inch (6.73 m)	12 feet 9 inches (3.89 m)	197 long tons (200 t)	
Newhaven, N.B.		469	Steel	Trawler - Steam	1909	110 feet 3 inches (33.60 m)	21 feet 8 inches (6.60 m)	11 feet 7 inches (3.53 m)	182 long tons (185 t)	
Ferryhill		470		Cargo Steamer	1909	160 feet 5 inches (48.90 m)	24 feet 1 inch (7.34 m)	11 feet 9 inches (3.58 m)	411 long tons (418 t)	
Pelaw Main		471	Steel	Cargo Steamer	1909	235 feet 1 inch (71.65 m)	34 feet 6 inches (10.52 m)	15 feet 9 inches (4.80 m)	1,221 long tons (1,241 t)	
Strathlossie		472	Steel	Trawler - Steam	1911	113 feet 1 inch (34.47 m)	21 feet 9 inches (6.63 m)	11 feet 7 inches (3.53 m)	193 long tons (196 t)	
Strathalmond		473	Steel	Trawler - Steam	1910	112 feet 9 inches (34.37 m)	21 feet 10 inches (6.65 m)	12 feet 7 inches (3.84 m)	194 long tons (197 t)	
Craigewan		474	Steel	Trawler - Steam	1910	117 feet 2 inches (35.71 m)	22 feet 1 inch (6.73 m)	12 feet 2 inches (3.71 m)	204 long tons (207 t)	
Seis		475	Steel	Trawler - Steam	1910	134 feet 4 inches (40.94 m)	23 feet 1 inch (7.04 m)	12 feet 6 inches (3.81 m)	263 long tons (267 t)	
Intaba		476	Steel	Passenger and Cargo	1910	386 feet 1 inch (117.68 m)	48 feet 2 inches (14.68 m)	27 feet 1 inch (8.26 m)	4,736 long tons (4,812 t)	
Loch Maree		477	Steel	Trawler - Steam	1910	115 feet 3 inches (35.13 m)	22 feet 5 inches (6.83 m)	12 feet 1 inch (3.68 m)	215 long tons (218 t)	
Charles		478		Trawler - Steam	1910	85 feet 3 inches (25.98 m)	19 feet 1 inch (5.82 m)	10 feet 6 inches (3.20 m)	93 long tons (94 t)	
John G. Watson		479		Trawler - Steam	1910	115 feet 3 inches (35.13 m)	22 feet 1 inch (6.73 m)	12 feet 9 inches (3.89 m)	196 long tons (199 t)	
John C. Meikle		480	Steel	Trawler - Steam	1910	112 feet 9 inches (34.37 m)	22 feet 1 inch (6.73 m)	12 feet 9 inches (3.89 m)	198 long tons (201 t)	
Thomas Young		481	Steel	Trawler - Steam	1910	112 feet 7 inches (34.32 m)	22 feet 2 inches (6.76 m)	11 feet 9 inches (3.58 m)	198 long tons (201 t)	
Strathlethen		482	Steel	Trawler - Steam	1911	112 feet 7 inches (34.32 m)	21 feet 9 inches (6.63 m)	11 feet 7 inches (3.53 m)	192 long tons (195 t)	
Strathfinella		483	Steel	Trawler - Steam	1911	113 feet (34 m)	21 feet 9 inches (6.63 m)	11 feet 7 inches (3.53 m)	192 long tons (195 t)	
John E. Lewis		484		Trawler - Steam	1911	125 feet 4 inches (38.20 m)	23 feet 1 inch (7.04 m)	13 feet 6 inches (4.11 m)	253 long tons (257 t)	
A. Spence Macdonald		485	Steel	Trawler - Steam	1911	115 feet 2 inches (35.10 m)	22 feet 1 inch (6.73 m)	11 feet 9 inches (3.58 m)	195 long tons (198 t)	
Watchful		486	Steel	Coastguard Tender	1911	145 feet 3 inches (44.27 m)	25 feet 1 inch (7.65 m)	15 feet (4.6 m)	398 long tons (404 t)	
Star of Freedom		487		Trawler - Steam	1911	125 feet 4 inches (38.20 m)	23 feet 1 inch (7.04 m)	13 feet 9 inches (4.19 m)	258 long tons (262 t)	
Siete		488		Trawler - Steam	1911	136 feet 4 inches (41.55 m)	23 feet 7 inches (7.19 m)	12 feet 6 inches (3.81 m)	276 long tons (280 t)	
Ocho		489		Trawler - Steam	1911	136 feet 4 inches (41.55 m)	23 feet 7 inches (7.19 m)	12 feet 6 inches (3.81 m)	275 long tons (279 t)	
Heortnesse		490	Steel	Trawler - Steam	1911	112 feet 7 inches (34.32 m)	22 feet 1 inch (6.73 m)	11 feet 9 inches (3.58 m)	198 long tons (201 t)	
Kudos		491	Steel	Trawler - Steam	1911	115 feet 5 inches (35.18 m)	22 feet 6 inches (6.86 m)	12 feet 2 inches (3.71 m)	207 long tons (210 t)	
Strathderry		492	Steel	Trawler - Steam	1911	112 feet 8 inches (34.34 m)	21 feet 9 inches (6.63 m)	11 feet 7 inches (3.53 m)	193 long tons (196 t)	
Strathgeldie		493	Steel	Trawler - Steam	1911	112 feet 8 inches (34.34 m)	21 feet 9 inches (6.63 m)	11 feet 7 inches (3.53 m)	192 long tons (195 t)	
George D. Irvin		494	Steel	Trawler - Steam	1911	115 feet 3 inches (35.13 m)	22 feet 1 inch (6.73 m)	11 feet 9 inches (3.58 m)	194 long tons (197 t)	
Tina Nutten		495	Steel	Trawler - Steam	1911	110 feet 5 inches (33.66 m)	21 feet 8 inches (6.60 m)	11 feet 8 inches (3.56 m)	187 long tons (190 t)	
Strathtummel		496	Steel	Trawler - Steam	1911	115 feet 2 inches (35.10 m)	22 feet 1 inch (6.73 m)	12 feet 2 inches (3.71 m)	210 long tons (210 t)	
Strathurie		497	Steel	Trawler - Steam	1911	115 feet 4 inches (35.15 m)	22 feet 1 inch (6.73 m)	12 feet 2 inches (3.71 m)	210 long tons (210 t)	
Earl Marischal		498		Trawler - Steam	1911	117 feet 3 inches (35.74 m)	22 feet 1 inch (6.73 m)	13 feet (4.0 m)	206 long tons (209 t)	
Northman		499	Steel	Trawler - Steam	1911	115 feet 2 inches (35.10 m)	22 feet (6.7 m)	12 feet 1 inch (3.68 m)	197 long tons (200 t)	
Aberdon		500	Steel	Cargo - Collier (Coal)	1911	210 feet 6 inches (64.16 m)	32 feet 1 inch (9.78 m)	16 feet (4.9 m)	1,005 long tons (1,021 t)	

== Notes ==
- Where available, vessel measurements taken from Lloyd's Register, giving registered length, beam and draft. Hall, Russell and Company's own measurements typically are length overall, beam and moulded depth.
- Yard Number 464 John E. Lewis (1909) sold in 1910 and replaced with Yard Number 484 John E. Lewis (1911)
