= Queen (Canadian automobile) =

The Queen was a Canadian automobile manufactured in Toronto between 1901 and 1903 by the Queen City Cycle & Motor Works. The car was a 4-seater runabout powered by an 823cc single-cylinder engine mounted under the front seat.

The clutch and gearbox were so rough that passengers were sometimes thrown out. In 1903, company president Cornelius Ryerson gave up on the car and purchased a Cadillac.

== See also ==
- Photo of only surviving Queen automobile
