= Car de Luxe =

American automobile

The Car de Luxe was an American automobile manufactured in Detroit from 1906 until 1910. A sister marque to the Queen, the Car de Luxe had overhead valves which were operated by one rocker per cylinder. The 40/50 hp, 6755 cc car was actuated by a "push-pull" rod and an unusual back axle; the load was further taken by an I-beam dead axle which carried a separate differential unit.
