= Queen's School of Environmental Studies =

Unit at Queen's University in Ontario, Canada

School of Environmental Studies
- Type: School
- Parent institution: Faculty of Arts and Science
- Affiliations: Queen's University at Kingston
- Director: Alice Hovorka
- Academic staff: 12
- Location: Kingston, Ontario, Canada
- Website: www.queensu.ca/ensc

The Queen's School of Environmental Studies is a unit of the Faculty of Arts and Science at Queen's University at Kingston in Kingston, Ontario, Canada. The school offers an interdisciplinary approach to undergraduate and graduate studies dealing with the environment.
