= Queen (name) =

Queen is a given name and surname. In some cases it originated as a shortening of the surname MacQueen. In other cases it was the nickname of an ancestor that later became the family's surname.

== Given name ==
- Queen Celestine (born 1992), Nigerian beauty queen
- Queen Egbo (born 2000), American basketball player
- Queen Harrison (born 1988), American hurdler and sprinter
- Queen Hazarika (born 1976), Indian playback singer and actress
- Queen Latifah (born 1970), American actress and songwriter
- Queen Muhammad Ali, American film director
- Queen Nwokoye (born 1982), Nigerian actress
- Queen Okafor (born 1987), Nigerian nurse
- Queen Saray Villegas (born 2003), Colombian BMX cyclist
- Queen Naija (born 1995), R&B Singer

== Surname ==
- Alvin Queen (born 1950), Swiss jazz drummer
- Ben Queen, American screenwriter
- Billy Queen (baseball) (1928–2006), American baseball outfielder
- Brenden Queen (born 1997), American professional driver
- Carmen Queen (1912–1974), Canadian Anglican bishop
- Carol Queen (born 1958), American sexologist and writer
- Caroline Queen (born 1992), American slalom canoer
- Derik Queen (born 2004), American basketball player
- Gerry Queen (born 1945), Scottish football forward
- Howard Queen (1893–1978), American army officer
- Jeff Queen (born 1946), American National Football League running back
- Jenny Queen (born 1979), American singer-songwriter
- Joe Sam Queen (born 1950), American politician in the North Carolina House of Representatives
- Mary Jane Queen (1914–2007), American ballad singer and banjo player
- Mel Queen (pitcher) (1918–1982), American baseball player
- Mel Queen (pitcher/outfielder) (1942–2011), American baseball player
- Monica Queen, Scottish singer
- Pamela E. Queen, American politician in the Maryland General Assembly
- Patrick Queen (born 1999), American football player
- Richard Queen (1951–2002), American consul taken hostage during the Iran Hostage Crisis
- Robin Queen, American linguist
- Wendy Lee Queen (born 1981), American chemist and material scientist
- William Queen, American law enforcement officer and writer

In fiction:

- Ellery Queen, fictional detective created by Frederic Dannay and Manfred Bennington Lee
- Oliver Queen, The Billionaire secret identity of DC Superhero Green Arrow created by Mort Weisinger and George Papp!

== See also ==
- Queen, the well-meaning main antagonist of chapter 2 of Deltarune
