= Queen's Theater (Liberia) =

Theater in Ganta, Liberia

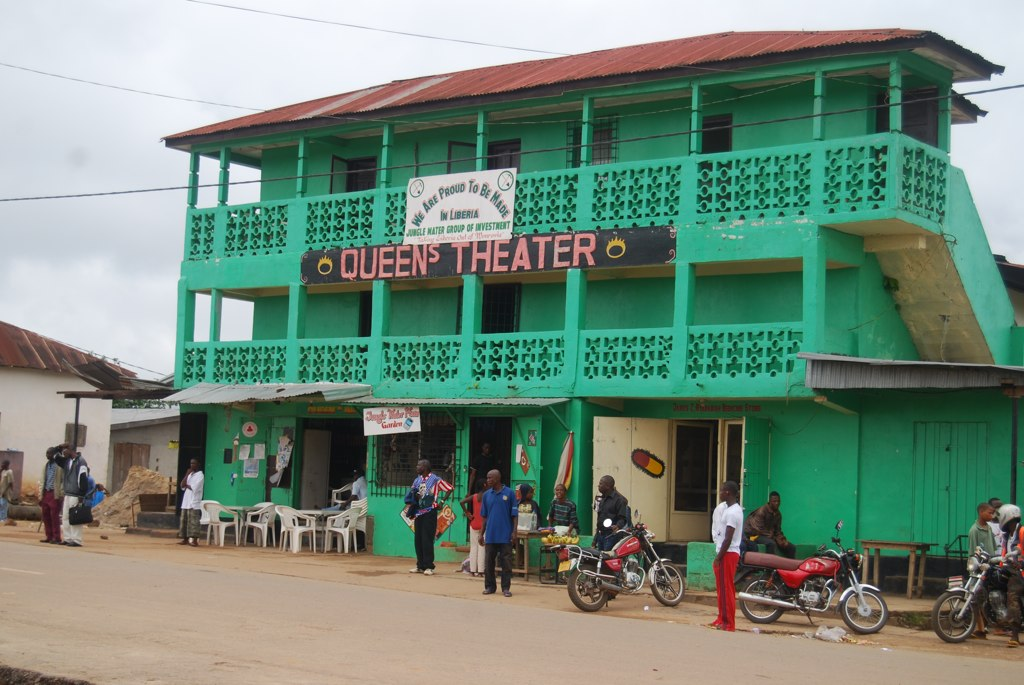
- Location: Ganta, Liberia

Queen's Theater is a theater in Ganta, Liberia. It is one of the few theaters in Liberia and is a tourist destination in Ganta.
