= Queen's School of Kinesiology and Health Studies =

The Queen's School of Kinesiology and Health Studies is a school within the Faculty of Arts and Science of Queen's University at Kingston in Kingston, Ontario, Canada. It was formerly known as the School of Physical and Health Education.
