= List of shipwrecks in November 1856 =

The list of shipwrecks in November 1856 includes ships sunk, foundered, grounded, or otherwise lost during November 1856.

== 1 November ==
List of shipwrecks: 1 November 1856
Ship	State	Description
Ardina	Netherlands	The galiot collided with the steamship Sylph (United Kingdom) and sank in the English Channel off Beachy Head, Sussex, United Kingdom with the loss of three of her crew. She was on a voyage from Lisbon, Portugal to Vlaardingen, South Holland.
Dundalk	United Kingdom	The paddle steamer ran aground in the Clyde near Dumbarton Castle.
Margaret	United Kingdom	The ship was lost near Tromsø. Her crew were rescued.
North American	United Kingdom	The steamship ran aground in the Saint Lawrence River. She was on a voyage from Montreal, Province of Canada, British North America to Liverpool, Lancashire.

== 2 November ==
List of shipwrecks: 2 November 1856
Ship	State	Description
Anne Armstrong	United Kingdom	The ship ran aground in the River Avon. She was on a voyage from Callao, Peru to Bristol, Gloucestershire.
Bordeaux	United Kingdom	The steamship was driven ashore and wrecked at "Krasniagorka", Russia. Her crew were rescued. She was on a voyage from Hull, Yorkshire to Kronstadt, Russia.
Canadian	United Kingdom	The steamship was driven ashore on White Island, British North America. she was on a voyage from Liverpool, Lancashire to Quebec City, Province of Canada, British North America. She was refloated the next day and completed her voyage.
Dan	Denmark	The brig ran aground and capsized at Hartlepool, County Durham, United Kingdom. She was on a voyage from Hartlepool to Rio de Janeiro, Brazil.
Eole	France	The schooner was wrecked on "Île Recervo", Finistère. Her crew were rescued. She was on a voyage from Saint-Malo, Ille-et-Vilaine to Bayonne, Basses-Pyrénées.
Letitia	United Kingdom	The ship was wrecked on the Hoop Sand, in the Bristol Channel. Her crew were rescued. She was on a voyage from Dublin to Bristol, Gloucestershire.
Pallas	United Kingdom	The ship ran aground in the Shipwash Sand, in the North Sea off the coast of Suffolk. She was refloated and taken in to Harwich, Essex in a leaky condition.

== 3 November ==
List of shipwrecks: 3 November 1856
Ship	State	Description
Southern Belle	United States	The ship was destroyed by fire in the Atlantic Ocean. She was on a voyage from Liverpool, Lancashire, United Kingdom to Boston, Massachusetts.
Washington	Norway	The ship sank. She was on a voyage from Chatham, Kent, United Kingdom to Porsgrund.

== 4 November ==
List of shipwrecks: 4 November 1856
Ship	State	Description
American Republic	United States	The barque was driven against the breakwater and sank at Oswego, Illinois.
Gundela	Hamburg	The ship ran aground on the Lemon and Ore Sand, in the North Sea. She was on a voyage from South Shields, County Durham, United Kingdom to Caldera, Chile. She was refloated and taken in to Hull, Yorkshire, United Kingdom in a severely leaky condition.
Henrietta	United Kingdom	The ship was driven ashore and wrecked on Prince Edward Island, British North America with the loss of three of her crew. She was on a voyage from Charlottetown, Prince Edward Island to Glasgow, Renfrewshire.
J. G. Deshler	United States	The schooner was driven ashore 9 nautical miles (17 km) north of Oswego.
Lyonnaise	France	After colliding with the barque Adriatic (United States) in fog on 2 November, the steamer sank in the Nantucket Shoals in the North Atlantic Ocean off Nantucket, Massachusetts, United States. One hundred and twenty passengers and crew perished. Sixteen survivors were rescued by the barques Elise (Bremen) and Elise (Hamburg). Lyonnaise was on a voyage from New York, United States to Havre de Grâce, Seine-Inférieure. The brig Beauty (United Kingdom) rescued some survivors. The barque Essex (United States) rescued two survivors on 6 December.
Prince Albert	United Kingdom	The steamship was driven ashore on Saint Helen's Island, Province of Canada, British North America.
Queen of the Isles	United Kingdom	The ship was driven ashore on Aegina, Greece. She was on a voyage from Liverpool, Lancashire to Odesa. She was refloated.
St. Joseph	United States	The ship was driven ashore and wrecked at Fairport, Michigan. Her crew were rescued.
Waakzamheid	Netherlands	The galiot was beached at Dublin, United Kingdom. She was on a voyage from Liverpool to Harlingen, Friesland.
Williams	United Kingdom	The schooner was driven ashore at Escalles, Pas-de-Calais, France. She was on a voyage from Blyth, Northumberland to Calais. She had been refloated by 12 November and taken in to Calais.
Windsor	United Kingdom	The steamship ran aground on the East Hoyle Bank, in Liverpool Bay. She was on a voyage from Drogheda, County Louth to Liverpool. She was refloated and taken in to Liverpool.

== 5 November ==
List of shipwrecks: 5 November 1856
Ship	State	Description
Celia	United States	The ship was driven ashore and wrecked at New Romney, Kent, United Kingdom. She was on a voyage from London, United Kingdom to New York.
Cuthbert Young	United Kingdom	The ship was driven ashore near Hamina, Grand Duchy of Finland. She was on a voyage from Saint Petersburg, Russia to London.
Globe	United Kingdom	The smack was driven ashore and wrecked at Swansea, Glamorgan. She was on a voyage from Swansea to Bude, Cornwall.
Leader	United Kingdom	The ship struck the Pancake Rock, off the coast of Newfoundland, British North America and sank. She was on a voyage from Waterford to Saint John's, Newfoundland.
Leopoldino	Portugal	The brig was abandoned off Ramsgate, Kent. She was on a voyage from Riga, Russia to Porto. She was later taken in to Ramsgate in a derelict condition.
Majestic	United Kingdom	The barque was driven ashore and wrecked at New Romney. She was on a voyage from South Shields, County Durham to Almena, Spain.
Meteor	United Kingdom	The ship departed from New York, United States for Bristol, Gloucestershire. No further trace, presumed foundered with the loss of all hands.
Spring	United Kingdom	The brig was driven ashore and wrecked on "Little Wrangelsholm", in the Baltic Sea.
Tartar	United Kingdom	The schooner was wrecked on the Goodwin Sands, Kent. She was on a voyage from Great Yarmouth, Norfolk to Waterford.

== 6 November ==
List of shipwrecks: 6 November 1856
Ship	State	Description
Ann Keen	United Kingdom	The schooner was driven ashore in the Dardanelles at "Aktash", Ottoman Empire. She was refloated.
Enmore	United Kingdom	The barque was driven ashore and wrecked at "Aktash". She was on a voyage from Marseille, Bouches-du-Rhône, France to Constantinople, Ottoman Empire.
Eunomia	Sweden	The ship was sighted in the Øresund whilst on a voyage from Helsingborg to London, United Kingdom. No further trace, presumed foundered with the loss of all hands.
General Dunlop	United States	The ship was wrecked near Europa Point, Gibraltar. Her crew were rescued. She was on a voyage from New Orleans, Louisiana to Vigo and Alicante, Spain.
Granville	(United Kingdom of Great Britain and Ireland) British North America	The schooner was abandoned in the Atlantic Ocean. Her crew were rescued.
La Perle	France	The cutter was driven ashore between Pontac and La Rocque, Jersey, Channel Islands. She was on a voyage from Regnéville-sur-Mer, Manche to Saint-Vaast-la-Hougue, Manche. She was later refloated and taken in to Saint Helier, Jersey.
Margaret	United Kingdom	The ship was driven ashore by ice at Krasnaya Gorka, Russia and was wrecked. Her crew were rescued.
Phoenix	(Russian Empire) Grand Duchy of Finland	The ship ran aground on the Longsand, in the North Sea off the coast of Essex, United Kingdom. Her crew were rescued.
Richard Cobden	United Kingdom	The Mersey Flat sank in the River Mersey. Her crew were rescued.
Zebulon	United Kingdom	The ship was wrecked on Cayo Confites. Her crew were rescued. She was on a voyage from Glasgow, Renfrewshire to Havana, Cuba.

== 7 November ==
List of shipwrecks: 7 November 1856
Ship	State	Description
Brownie	United Kingdom	The lighter, under tow of the steamship Vixen (United Kingdom), was in collision with the steamship Emerald (United Kingdom) and sank in the Clyde at Govan, Renfrewshire. Her two crew survived.
David	United Kingdom	The schooner was wrecked on the Gunfleet Sand, in the North Sea off the coast of Essex. Her crew were rescued by the smack Phoenix (United Kingdom). David was on a voyage from Arkhangelsk, Russia to London.
Devonshire	United Kingdom	The steamship ran aground in the River Mersey. She was on a voyage from Liverpool, Lancashire to London.
Eblana	United Kingdom	The paddle steamer collided with Sandon Pier, Liverpool, Lancashire and was damaged. She was on a voyage from Dublin to Liverpool.
Eleanor Lancaster	United Kingdom	The three-masted barque was wrecked on Oyster Bank, in the Pacific Ocean off Newcastle, New South Wales. Her sixteen crew survived.
Elizabeth	United Kingdom	The ship was driven ashore at Sutton, County Dublin. She was on a voyage from Liverpool to Dordrecht, South Holland, Netherlands. She was refloated and taken in to Dublin.
Forest King	(United Kingdom of Great Britain and Ireland) New South Wales	The ship was wrecked at Newcastle.
Hollandia	Netherlands	The ship ran aground on the Haisborough Sands, in the North Sea off the coast of Norfolk, United Kingdom and was abandoned by all but her captain.
Jane	(United Kingdom of Great Britain and Ireland) New South Wales	The ship was wrecked at Newcastle.
Landdrost Lutken	Russia	The ship departed from Kronstadt for Hull, Yorkshire, United Kingdom. No further trace, presumed foundered with the loss of all hands.
Mary Macklin	United Kingdom	The ship collided with Mangerton (United Kingdom) and sank off Mizen Head, County Cork. Her crew were rescued by Mangerton.
Rover	(United Kingdom of Great Britain and Ireland) New South Wales	The ship was wrecked at Newcastle.
Richard Cowle	Elbing	The barque departed from South Shields, County Durham, United Kingdom for Pillau, Prussia. No further trace, presumed foundered with the loss of all hands.

== 8 November ==
List of shipwrecks: 8 November 1856
Ship	State	Description
Beraza	United Kingdom	The ship ran aground on Morup's Reef, in the Baltic Sea. She was on a voyage from Prussia to Hull, Yorkshire. Bereza was refloated on 14 November and taken in to "Warberg" for repairs.
Hope	United Kingdom	The brig ran aground on the Longsand, in the North Sea off the coast of Essex whilst on her maiden voyage. She was refloated with assistance from the smack Tryall (United Kingdom) and assisted in to Harwich, Essex.
Linden	United States	The ship struck a submerged object and sank. She was on a voyage from Shreveport, Louisiana to New Orleans, Louisiana.
Maria	United Kingdom	The ship sank in the North Sea. Her crew were rescued by Thirteen (United Kingdom).
Mars	United Kingdom	The ship was abandoned in the Irish Sea. Her crew were rescued and she foundered. She was on a voyage from Kilrush, County Clare to Liverpool, Lancashire.
Oberon	United Kingdom	The ship was sighted in the Øresund whilst on a voyage from Danzig to London. No further trace, presumed foundered with the loss of all hands.
Sarnia	United Kingdom	The steamship was sighted in the Øresund whilst on a voyage from Saint Petersburg, Russia to London. No further trace, presumed foundered with the loss of all hands.
Spring	United Kingdom	The ship was driven ashore and wrecked on Scharhörn. Her crew were rescued. She was on a voyage from Middlesbrough, Yorkshire to Altona.
Taube	Sweden	The ship was driven ashore west of Wells-next-the-Sea, Norfolk, United Kingdom. She was on a voyage from Ängelholm to London. She had become a wreck by 12 November.
Tiger	United Kingdom	The schooner was abandoned in Liverpool Bay and sank. Her crew were rescued by the Hoylake Lifeboat.

== 9 November ==
List of shipwrecks: 9 November 1856
Ship	State	Description
Emerald Isle	United Kingdom	The ship departed from Singapore, Straits Settlements for Hong Kong. No further trace, presumed foundered with the loss of all hands.
Emma	United Kingdom	The ship was wrecked on the Flat Rock, off the coast of Newfoundland, British North America with the loss of a crew member. She was on a voyage from Liverpool, Lancashire to Newfoundland.
Kitty	United Kingdom	The ship was lost at Foo Choo Foo, China.
Star of Hope	United Kingdom	The ship was damaged by fire at Bristol, Gloucestershire.
Speculation	United Kingdom	The ship struck a rock and sank off Linney Head, Pembrokeshire. Her crew were rescued. She was on a voyage from Barrow-in-Furness, Lancashire to Newport, Monmouthshire.
Tricolour	Norway	The brig foundered in the North Sea. Her nine crew were rescued by the smack Elizabeth (United Kingdom).
Vixen	United Kingdom	The smack heeled over and sank at Dublin. She was righted.

== 10 November ==
List of shipwrecks: 10 November 1856
Ship	State	Description
Annechina	Netherlands	The koff was driven ashore and wrecked near Horne, Denmark. She was on a voyage from Gothenburg, Sweden to Hull, Yorkshire, United Kingdom.
Black Nymph	United Kingdom	The ship was wrecked on the Faludd Reef, in the Baltic Sea. She was on a voyage from Kronstadt, Russia to London.
D'Arcy	United Kingdom	The ship was wrecked on the Faludd Reef. She was on a voyage from Kronstadt to London.
Eastern Monarch	United Kingdom	The ship ran aground in the River Tay. She was on a voyage from Dundee, Forfarshire to Bombay, India. She was refloated and resumed her voyage, but consequently put in to Leith, Lothian in a leaky condition.
Hepsa	United Kingdom	The ship was wrecked on the Skagen Reef, in the Baltic Sea. She was on a voyage from "Wyburg" to Hull.
Johanna	Danzig	The ship foundered in the North Sea 15 nautical miles (28 km) east of Berwick upon Tweed, Northumberland, United Kingdom. Her crew were rescued. She was on a voyage from Grangemouth, Stirlingshire, United Kingdom to Copenhagen, Denmark.
John Hunter	United Kingdom	The ship was wrecked on the Faludd Reef. She was on a voyage from Kronstadt to London.
Mayarel	Flag unknown	The ship was driven ashore at Kronstadt, Russia.
Pomona	United Kingdom	The ship was in collision with another vessel and sank of Harwich, Essex. Her crew were rescued by the smack Orwell (United Kingdom). Pomona was on a voyage from London to "Kelvinaton".
Regina	United Kingdom	The full-rigged ship ran aground on the Hirtshals Shoal, in the North Sea off the coast of Denmark. Her nine crew took to a boat, but four of them died before they landed at Ringkøbing on 13 November. She was on a voyage from Port Talbot, Glamorgan to Gothenburg, Sweden.
Richard Cobden	United Kingdom	The Mersey Flat was holed by an anchor and sank in the Salisbury Dock, Liverpool, Lancashire.
Roslin	United Kingdom	The steamship was sighted in the Øresund whilst on the return leg of her maiden voyage, from Stettin to Leith, Lothian. Subsequently foundered with the loss of all hands, wreckage from the vessel washed up on Skagen, Denmark.
Tekelina Hendrika	Netherlands	The full-rigged ship sank in the Mediterranean Sea off Bastia, Corsica, France. She was on a voyage from Newcastle upon Tyne, Northumberland to Livorno, Grand Duchy of Tuscany.
Tyne	United Kingdom	The ship was wrecked on the Faludd Reef. She was on a voyage from "Wyborg" to London.

== 11 November ==
List of shipwrecks: 11 November 1856
Ship	State	Description
Ceres	United Kingdom	The ship was holed by ice and sank at Kronstadt, Russia.
C. E. Wittensen	(Russian Empire) Grand Duchy of Finland	The ship departed from Uusikaupunki for an English port. She subsequently foundered with the loss of all hands.
Elizabeth Holderness	United Kingdom	The ship was driven ashore at Cape Canso, Nova Scotia, British North America. She was on a voyage from Belfast, County Antrim to Richibucto, New Brunswick, British North America. She was consequently condemned.
Kertch	Russia	The ship was driven ashore at Kronstadt.
Mary Clark	United Kingdom	The ship was driven ashore at Kronstadt.
Norfolk Lass	United Kingdom	The ship was driven ashore and damaged near Bridlington, Yorkshire. She was refloated on 10 December.
Resolute	United Kingdom	The ship was driven ashore on Öland, Sweden. She was on a voyage from "Wyborg" to Wisbech, Cambridgeshire.
Thor	Norway	The ship ran aground on a reef north west of Læsø, Denmark and was damaged. She was on a voyage from Riga, Russia to London, United Kingdom. She was refloated and put in to Fredrikshavn, Denmark.

== 12 November ==
List of shipwrecks: 12 November 1856
Ship	State	Description
A. B. van Olinda	United Kingdom	The ship departed from Philadelphia, Pennsylvania, United States for Londonderry. No further trace, presumed foundered in the Atlantic Ocean with the loss of all hands.
Albion	United Kingdom	The barque sprang a leak. She was abandoned on 16 November 40 nautical miles (74 km) west south west of the Hanstholmen Lighthouse, Denmark. Her crew were rescued. She was on a voyage from Danzig to Southampton, Hampshire
Constance	United Kingdom	The ship was driven ashore near Christiansand, Norway. She was on a voyage from Stockholm, Sweden to an English port. She had been refloated by 20 November and towed in to Christiansand, Norway, where she was condemned.
Forrester	United Kingdom	The ship was destroyed by fire in the River Thames at Northfleet, Kent. She was on a voyage from Saint Petersburg, Russia to London.
John	United Kingdom	The brig was driven into Rose (United Kingdom and another vessel and came ashore at Gorleston, Suffolk. She was on a voyage from Hartlepool, County Durham to London.
Lambton	United Kingdom	The brig was driven ashore and wrecked at Lowestoft, Suffolk. Her crew were rescued. She was on a voyage from London to Sunderland, County Durham.
Louisiana	United States	The ship ran aground on the Little Burbo Bank, in Liverpool Bay and capsized. Her crew were rescued by the Formby Lifeboat. She was on a voyage from Liverpool, Lancashire, United Kingdom to New Orleans, Louisiana. She had broken up by 24 November.
Nancy	United Kingdom	The brig was driven ashore at Cleethorpes, Lincolnshire. She was on a voyage from London to South Shields, County Durham. She was refloated on 12 December and taken in to Grimsby, Lincolnshire.
Providentia	(Russian Empire) Grand Duchy of Finland	The ship was abandoned in the North Sea 60 nautical miles (110 km) off Lindesnes, Norway. Her crew were rescued by the steamship St. Olaf (Norway). Providentia was on a voyage from Pori to Hull, Yorkshire, United Kingdom. She was subsequently taken in to Løkken-Vrå, Denmark.
Samuel M. Fox	United States	The ship ran aground on the Great Burbo Bank, in Liverpool Bay. Her passengers and all but three of her crew were taken off. She was on a voyage from Liverpool to New York, United States. She broke up on 24 November.
Seaflower	(United Kingdom of Great Britain and Ireland) Jersey	The ship was driven ashore at Caraquet, New Brunswick, British North America. She was refloated on 17 November.
Silas M. Wright	United States	The ship ran aground on the Great Burbo Bank, in Liverpool Bay and was abandoned. She was on a voyage from Liverpool to New York. She had broken up by 17 November.
Sir William Wallace	United Kingdom	The brig was driven ashore at Tetney, Lincolnshire. She was on a voyage from Quebec City, Province of Canada, British North America to Hull, Yorkshire. She was refloated on 29 December and taken in to Grimsby, Lincolnshire.
Union, or Unity	United Kingdom	The brig foundered in the North Sea off Cromer, Norfolk with the loss of all hands and two crew of the fishing smack Royal Diadem (United Kingdom), who had been out aboard to assist the distressed vessel.
Uranie	France	The ship was in collision with another vessel in The Downs. She was on a voyage from South Shields to Martinique. She put in to Dover, Kent, United Kingdom, where she ran aground.

== 13 November ==
List of shipwrecks: 13 November 1856
Ship	State	Description
John	United Kingdom	The ship ran aground in the Belfast Lough. She was on a voyage from Belfast, County Antrim to Liverpool, Lancashire. She was refloated on 17 November and put back to Belfast for repairs.
Louise	United Kingdom	The brig ran aground and was wrecked on the coast Norway. Her crew were rescued. She was on a voyage from Saint Petersburg, Russia to Liverpool.
Maria Dorothea	Rostock	The ship foundered in the North Sea off Heyst, West Flanders, Belgium. She was on a voyage from Vlissingen, Zeeland, Netherlands to Newcastle upon Tyne, Northumberland, United Kingdom.
Peri	United Kingdom	The schooner ran aground on the Salmedner Rock, off the coast of Spain. She was on a voyage from Newport, Monmouthshire to Seville, Spain. She was refloated and resumed her voyage.

== 14 November ==
List of shipwrecks: 14 November 1856
Ship	State	Description
Argo	Norway	The brig sank in the North Sea. Her crew were rescued by the brig Careol (Denmark). Argo was on a voyage from Newcastle upon Tyne, Northumberland, United Kingdom to Gothenburg, Sweden.
Elizabeth	United Kingdom	The ship was driven ashore and wrecked south of Scarborough, Yorkshire. Her four crew were rescued by a coble. She was on a voyage from Memel, Prussia to London.
Two Brothers	United Kingdom	The ship was wrecked at Wells-next-the-Sea, Norfolk. Her crew were rescued.

== 15 November ==
List of shipwrecks: 15 November 1856
Ship	State	Description
Admiral	(United Kingdom of Great Britain and Ireland) Jersey	The cutter foundered 12 nautical miles (22 km) east of Christiansand, Norway with the loss of one of her three crew. She was on a voyage from Danzig to Grangemouth, Stirlingshire.
Elfin	United Kingdom	The schooner was driven ashore near "Sandoen", Norway. Her crew were rescued. She was on a voyage from Memel, Prussia to Dundee, Forfarshire.
Elizabeth	United Kingdom	The ship was driven ashore and wrecked south of Scarborough, Yorkshire. She was on a voyage from Methil, Fife to London.
Gipsey Queen	United Kingdom	The ship was driven ashore at Boston, Massachusetts, United States. She was on a voyage from Liverpool, Lancashire to Boston. She was later refloated and taken in to Charleston, South Carolina, United States.
Mary Ann	United Kingdom	The schooner was wrecked near Aspoo, Finland. Her crew were rescued. She was on a voyage from Saint Petersburg, Russia to Dublin.
Petrel	United Kingdom	The brig foundered in the North Sea off the Leman Sandbank. Crew presumed to have perished.
Sea	United Kingdom	The barque was damaged by fire at Liverpool, Lancashire.
Vistula	Prussia)	The steamship was driven ashore near Flensburg, Duchy of Holstein. Her crew were rescued. She was on a voyage from Königsberg to Vlissingen, Zeeland, Netherlands.
William Beckett	United Kingdom	The steamship foundered in the Baltic Sea 250 nautical miles (460 km) off Skagen, Denmark. Her crew were rescued by Eugenia (Denmark). She was on a voyage from Danzig to London.

== 16 November ==
List of shipwrecks: 16 November 1856
Ship	State	Description
Adolf	Denmark	The ship ran aground on the Girdler Sand, in the North Sea off the coast of Suffolk, United Kingdom, having been abandoned following the death of her captain, who was suspected of having been murdered. She was on a voyage from Saint Petersburg, Russia to London, United Kingdom. She was refloated with assistance from the smack and New Union (United Kingdom) taken in to Whitstable, Kent, United Kingdom in a derelict condition.
Antje Antje	Norway	The koff foundered 2 nautical miles (3.7 km) south of Christiansand with the loss of all but one of her crew. She was on a voyage from Harlingen, Friesland, Netherlands to Christiansand.
Ballaba	Norway	The schooner was wrecked in the Pentland Firth. Her crew were rescued. She was on a voyage from Thurso, Caithness, United Kingdom to Dram.
Brazilian	United Kingdom	The ship was driven ashore by ice at Pärnu, Russia. Her crew were rescued. She was on a voyage from Liverpool, Lancashire to Kronstadt, Russia.
Cairngorm	United Kingdom	The ship was driven onto the Longseer Rocks, on the coast of County Durham. Her crew were rescued by the Hartlepool Lifeboat.
Ceres	United Kingdom	The ship was wrecked on the Northern Triangles. Her crew survived.
Clyde	United Kingdom	The barque was driven ashore south of Sunderland, County Durham.
Maria Janna Jacoba Berendina	Netherlands	The ship was driven ashore at Kilnsea, Yorkshire. Her crew were rescued. She was on a voyage from Aalborg, Denmark to Newcastle upon Tyne, Northumberland, United Kingdom. She was refloated on 27 December and taken in to Hull, Yorkshire.
Pekin	United Kingdom	The barque ran aground on the Herd Sand, in the North Sea off the coast of County Durham and was severely damaged. Her crew were rescued. She was on a voyage from South Shields, County Durham to Cartagena, Spain.
Robert and Mary	United Kingdom	The ship was driven ashore at Sunderland.
Sturt	(United Kingdom of Great Britain and Ireland) South Australia	The steamship ran aground at the mouth of the Murray River with the loss of two lives. She was refloated.
Zephyr	United Kingdom	The ship ran aground on the Schulhoek Bank, in the North Sea off the coast of Zeeland, Netherlands. She was on a voyage from the Clyde to Liverpool, Lancashire. She was later refloated and assisted in to Rotterdam, South Holland, Netherlands, where she arrived on 18 November.

== 17 November ==
List of shipwrecks: 17 November 1856
Ship	State	Description
Colne	United Kingdom	The schooner collided with Norval (United Kingdom) and sank in the North Sea off the Dudgeon Sandbank. Her crew were rescued.
Trekvogel	Netherlands	The ship was driven ashore at Egmond aan Zee, North Holland. Her crew were rescued. She was on a voyage from Rotterdam, South Holland to Newcastle upon Tyne, Northumberland, United Kingdom.
William Allen	United Kingdom	The schooner was wrecked on Bornholm, Denmark with the loss of three of her seven crew. She was on a voyage from Kronstadt, Russia to Fisherrow or Morrison's Haven, Lothian.

== 18 November ==
List of shipwrecks: 18 November 1856
Ship	State	Description
Argo	United Kingdom	The ship ran aground 8 nautical miles (15 km) off Pillau, Prussia. She was on a voyage from Königsberg, Prussia to Hull, Yorkshire. She was refloated and taken in to Pillau.
Dondangen	(Russian Empire) Grand Duchy of Finland	The ship was driven ashore on Dagö, Russia. Her crew were rescued. She was on a voyage from Hull to Helsinki.
Fortuna	United Kingdom	The ship was lost at Reval, Russia.
Mississippi	United States	The brig was wrecked on the Anegada Reef, Bahamas with the loss of three of her crew. She was on a voyage from Sint Eustatius, to Baltimore, Maryland.
Pansey	United Kingdom	The ship was driven ashore and damaged at Blyth, Northumberland. She was on a voyage from Blyth to London.
Transport	United States	The ship was abandoned in the Atlantic Ocean. Her crew were rescued by St. Louis (United States). Transport was on a voyage from Sunderland, County Durham, United Kingdom to New York.

== 19 November ==
List of shipwrecks: 19 November 1856
Ship	State	Description
Amelia	United Kingdom	The steamship ran aground at Bristol, Gloucestershire. She was on a voyage from Bristol to Liverpool, Lancashire. She was refloated and resumed her voyage.
Argo	Hamburg	The ship ran aground 8 nautical miles (15 km) from Pillau, Prussia. She was on a voyage from Königsberg, Prussia to Hull, Yorkshire, United Kingdom. She was refloated and put in to Pillau in a leaky condition.
Blossom	United Kingdom	The smack was driven ashore at Crosby Point, Lancashire.
Helene	United Kingdom	The ship was driven ashore at Cape Surop, Russia. She was on a voyage from Kronstadt, Russia to an English port.
Lydia	United Kingdom	The collier foundered in the North Sea off the coast of Yorkshire. Her crew were rescued.
Star of Hope	United Kingdom	The brig struck the Tuskar Rock and was abandoned. She came ashore at Dunraven Castle, Glamorgan and was wrecked.

== 20 November ==
List of shipwrecks: 20 November 1856
Ship	State	Description
Ardina	Netherlands	The galiot collided with the steamship Sylph (United Kingdom) and sank in the English Channel off the coast of Sussex with the loss of three of her crew. She was on a voyage from Lisbon, Portugal to Rotterdam, South Holland.
Courier	United Kingdom	The ship was driven ashore at Helsingør, Denmark. She was refloated.
Patrick Henry	United States	The full-rigged ship ran aground at Pernambuco, Brazil. She was on a voyage from Newfoundland, British North America to Pernambuco. She was refloated and taken in to Pernambuco, where she was condemned.
Royal Exchange	United Kingdom	The ship was driven ashore at Helsingør. She was refloated.
Schiedam	United Kingdom	The ship ran aground at Helsingør. She was refloated on 3 December and taken in to Copenhagen for repairs.
William Aldam	United Kingdom	The steamship ran aground and was wrecked near Rügenwalde, Prussia. Her crew were rescued. She was on a voyage from Königsberg, Prussia to London.

== 21 November ==
List of shipwrecks: 21 November 1856
Ship	State	Description
Ann Augusta	United Kingdom	The barque was driven ashore on Cape Sable Island, Nova Scotia, British North America. She was on a voyage from Saint John, New Brunswick, British North America to the Clyde. She was refloated and taken in to Green Island.
Free State	United States	The ship departed from New York for Lisbon, Portugal. No further trace, presumed foundered in the Atlantic Ocean with the loss of all hands.
Hebe	United Kingdom	The cutter collided with the collier Jarrow (United Kingdom) and sank off Orfordness, Suffolk. Her crew were rescued by Jarrow. Hebe was on a voyage from Portsmouth, Hampshire to Montrose, Forfarshire.
Heindrich	Flag unknown	The ship struck the Thistle Rocks and sank in the Göta älv. She was on a voyage from Hartlepool, County Durham to a Baltic port.
Hollander	Netherlands	The ship was lost at Reval, Russia.
Industry	United Kingdom	The ship was in collision with a schooner and foundered in the North Sea off Spurn Point, Yorkshire. Her crew were rescued. She was on a voyage from Newcastle upon Tyne, Northumberland to London.
Leonard	United Kingdom	The ship was wrecked near the Wingo Beacon. Her crew were rescued. She was on a voyage from London to Gothenburgh, Sweden.
Valerie Gerard	United Kingdom	The ship was driven ashore at "Malpa", Russia. She was on a voyage from Kunda, Russia to an English port.

== 22 November ==
List of shipwrecks: 22 November 1856
Ship	State	Description
Bourgainville	France	The ship was driven ashore at Sanlúcar de Barrameda, Spain. She was on a voyage from Bordeaux, Gironde to Cádiz, Spain. She was refloated and resumed her voyage.
Concordia	Netherlands	The galiot collided with the schooner Emilie (Prussia) off Skagen, Denmark and sank with the loss of a crew member. Survivors were rescued by Emilie. Concordia was on a voyage from Newcastle upon Tyne, Northumberland, United Kingdom to Copenhagen, Denmark.
Hoffnung	Kingdom of Hanover	The ship was driven ashore and wrecked on Borkum. Her crew were rescued. She was on a voyage from Hull, Yorkshire, United Kingdom to Leer.
J. H. Ryerson	Netherlands	The ship was wrecked at Amsterdam.
Kirkman Findlay	(United Kingdom of Great Britain and Ireland) British Guiana	The ship was driven ashore and wrecked on Pladda, in the Firth of Clyde. Her crew were rescued. She was on a voyage from Greenock, Renfrewshire to Demerara.
Lord George Bentinck	United Kingdom	The ship capsized and sank in the South Atlantic with the loss of four of her twenty crew. Survivors were rescued by the brig Cuba (United Kingdom). Lord George Bentinck was on a voyage from South Shields to San Francisco, California, United States.
Martha	United Kingdom	The ship was driven ashore south of Ayr.
Nordcap	Denmark	The schooner collided with the schooner Heinrich (Bremen) and was abandoned. She was subsequently towed in to "Kloppau" by a steamship.
Queen	United Kingdom	The ship was wrecked at the Sand Heads, India.
Recovery	United Kingdom	The ship was driven ashore and wrecked at Cairnbulg Head, Aberdeenshire. Her crew were rescued. She was on a voyage from Dundee, Forfarshire to Wick, Caithness.
Wild Wave	United Kingdom	The ship was wrecked on Maugre Key. She was on a voyage from Aspinwall, Republic of New Granada to Belize City, British Honduras.

== 23 November ==
List of shipwrecks: 23 November 1856
Ship	State	Description
Aratus	United Kingdom	The brig was driven ashore and wrecked near Schoorl, North Holland, Netherlands. Her crew were rescued. She was on a voyage from Sunderland, County Durham to Amsterdam, North Holland.
Eleventh April	Costa Rica	Filibuster War: The brig was sunk in an engagement with the schooner Granada (Nicaragua) with the loss of at least 70 of her 114 crew. Nine survivors were not expected to live.
Euphrosyne	Denmark	The ship was driven ashore 6 nautical miles (11 km) east of Dunkirk, Nord, France with the loss of all hands. Shew as on a voyage from Grangemouth, Stirlingshire, United Kingdom to Messina, Sicily.
Tantivy	United Kingdom	The ship ran aground on the Pluckington Bank, in the River Mersey. She was on a voyage from Bombay, India to Liverpool, Lancashire. She was refloated on 28 November and taken in to Liverpool.

== 24 November ==
List of shipwrecks: 24 November 1856
Ship	State	Description
British Token	United Kingdom	The barque was wrecked on the Freshwater Bank, in the Irish Sea off the coast of Lancashire with the loss of one of her four crew. She was on a voyage from Dundalk, County Louth to Fleetwood or Preston, Lancashire.
Ceres	Stralsund	The schooner ran aground off Borkum, Kingdom of Hanover and was abandoned by her crew.
Casis, or Cres	Prussia	The ship, a brig or schooner, was discovered derelict in the North Sea off Heligoland. She was taken in tow by the steamship Chanticleer (Netherlands) and taken in to South Shields, County Durham, United Kingdom.
Durham	United Kingdom	The ship was wrecked at Bermuda.
Elbe	United Kingdom	The ship ran aground in the Kallebostrand, near Copenhagen, Denmark. She was on a voyage from Danzig to Sunderland, County Durham. She was refloated and taken in to Copenhagen.
Halcyon	United Kingdom	The ship was driven ashore 15 to 20 wersts (8.64 to 11.52 nautical miles (16.00 to 21.34 km) from the mouth of the Narva River. She was on a voyage from Hull to Narva, Russia. Her crew were rescued. She was refloated on 4 April 1857.
Highland Mary	United Kingdom	The ship was wrecked 15 to 20 wersts from the mouth of the Narva River. Her crew were rescued.
I. O	United Kingdom	The ship was wrecked near Narva. Her crew were rescued.
John Haven	United Kingdom	The ship was driven ashore at Woodside, Cheshire. She was on a voyage from Liverpool, Lancashire to Calcutta, India. She was refloated.
Juste	France	The barque was abandoned in the Atlantic Ocean. Her fourteen crew were rescued by Elizabeth (United Kingdom). Juste was on a voyage from Cherbourg, Seine-Inférieure to Guadeloupe.
Leviathan	United Kingdom	The ship was wrecked 15 to 20 wersts (8.64 to 11.52 nautical miles (16.00 to 21.34 km) from the mouth of the Narva River. Her crew were rescued.
Nauticon	United States	The whaler, a full-rigged ship, was wrecked at Honolulu, Hawaii. Her crew were rescued by Embuscade (French Navy) and HMS Havannah (Royal Navy).
St. George	United Kingdom	The ship was wrecked on the Niding Reef, in the Baltic Sea. She was on a voyage from Stettin to Leith, Lothian.

== 25 November ==
List of shipwrecks: 25 November 1856
Ship	State	Description
Brothers	United Kingdom	The ship ran aground on the Herd Sand, in the North Sea off the coast of County Durham. She was on a voyage from Sunderland, County Durham to Aberdeen.
Clio	United Kingdom	The ship foundered off Villerville, Calvados, France. Her crew were rescued. She was on a voyage from Swansea, Glamorgan to Honfleur, Manche, France.
Emma Graham	United Kingdom	The ship was driven ashore and wrecked at "Tarsons", Ottoman Syria. Her crew were rescued.
Harriet	United Kingdom	The ship was driven ashore and wrecked on Ameland, Friesland, Netherlands with the loss of all hands.
Hellespont	United Kingdom	The ship was driven ashore and wrecked at "Sudiah", Ottoman Syria. Her crew were rescued.
Hermes	Kingdom of Hanover	The schooner was lost in the Elbe. Her crew were rescued. She was on a voyage from London, United Kingdom to Hamburg.
Hesperus	United Kingdom	The barque was driven ashore and wrecked on Kythira, Greece. She was on a voyage from Brǎila, Ottoman Empire to Falmouth, Cornwall or Queenstown, County Cork.
Little Wonder	United Kingdom	The ship was driven ashore at Sunderland. She was on a voyage from Montrose, Forfarshire to Sunderland. She was refloated and towed in to Sunderland in a leaky condition.
Neva	United Kingdom	The steamship sprang a leak and foundered in the North Sea 100 nautical miles (190 km) off the coast of Jutland. All on board were rescued by the schooner Belford (United Kingdom). She was on a voyage from Kronstadt, Russia to Gothenburg, Sweden and Hull, Yorkshire.
Northern Queen	United Kingdom	The ship departed from New York, United States for Bristol, Gloucestershire. No further trace, presumed foundered with the loss of all hands.
William	United Kingdom	The brig was wrecked on the Gunfleet Sand, in the North Sea off the coast of Essex. Her crew were rescued by Resolution (United Kingdom). William was on a voyage from Stockton-on-Tees, County Durham to London.

== 26 November ==
List of shipwrecks: 26 November 1856
Ship	State	Description
Ada	United Kingdom	The ship ran aground at Gothenburg, Sweden. She was on a voyage from South Shields, County Durham to Gothenburg. She was refloated and taken in to Gothenburg in a severely leaky condition.
Antje Sluiswijk, and Hendrika Annegina	Netherlands; Prussia	The full-rigged ship Antje Sluiswijk collided with Hendrika Annegeina in the Dogger Bank with the loss of three lives. Hendrik Annegina was on a voyage from Königsberg to London, United Kingdom.
Elizabeth Harrison	United Kingdom	The brig ran aground at Alexandria, Egypt. She was on a voyage from Sunderland, County Durham to Alexandria.
Hannah	United Kingdom	The ship was driven ashore at Flamborough Head, Yorkshire. She was on a voyage from Sandwich, Kent to Hartlepool, County Durham. She was refloated and resumed her voyage.
Henriette	Prussia	The full-rigged ship struck a sunken object in the River Tees and sank. She was on a voyage from Stockton-on-Tees, County Durham to Memel.
Invoice	United Kingdom	The brig was wrecked on the Culver Sand, in the Bristol Channel with the loss of all hands. She was on a voyage from Cardiff, Glamorgan to Genoa, Kingdom of Sardinia.
Jane	(United Kingdom of Great Britain and Ireland) British North America	The brigantine was wrecked on the Mille Vache Shoals. She was on a voyage from Montreal, Province of Canada to Saint John, New Brunswick.
Laibach	Austrian Empire	The barque was wrecked between Cape Bon and Cape Tartas, Algeria. Her crew were rescued.
Lusitania	United Kingdom	The brig went ashore between Osseken and Wittemburg, Pomerania, Prussia. Her crew were rescued. She was on a voyage from Riga, Russia to an English port.
Nymph	United Kingdom	The schooner was driven ashore at Sunderland, County Durham. Her crew were rescued by rocket apparatus. She was on a voyage from Hartlepool, County Durham to Teignmouth, Devon. She was refloated and taken in to Sunderland.
Swan	United Kingdom	The Mersey Flat was in collision with the steamship Bee (United Kingdom) and sank in the River Mersey.
Vivid	United Kingdom	The ship sank in Étaples Bay. Her crew were rescued. She was on a voyage from Charlestown, Cornwall to Étaples, Pas-de-Calais, France.
Willschina	Denmark	The galiot ran aground near Rønne. She was on a voyage from Königsberg to Hull, Yorkshire, United Kingdom.

== 27 November ==
List of shipwrecks: 27 November 1856
Ship	State	Description
Adler	Hamburg	The brig was driven ashore at Winterton-on-Sea, Norfolk, United Kingdom. She was on a voyage from Hamburg to Liverpool, Lancashire, United Kingdom. She was refloated on 12 December and taken in to Great Yarmouth, Norfolk.
Allison	United Kingdom	The barque was driven ashore near Alexandria, Egypt. She was on a voyage from Newport, Monmouthshire to Alexandria.
Dre Aurelius	Flag unknown	The ship ran aground at Queenstown, County Cork, United Kingdom. She was on a voyage from Smyrna, Ottoman Empire to Queenstown.
Falcon	United Kingdom	The ship ran aground at Queenstown. She was on a voyage from Liverpool to Cork.
Guilhermina	Portugal	The ship ran aground in the River Mersey. She was on a voyage from Lisbon to Queenstown.
Joseph Cunard	United Kingdom	The barque was driven ashore on "Flat Island". She was on a voyage from Troon, Ayrshire to Saint John, New Brunswick, British North America.
Sir Henry Webb	United Kingdom	The barque was run into by the steamship William Hutt (United Kingdom) in the River Tyne and was beached on the Dotwick Sand, in the North Sea off the coast of County Durham.
To Gezusters	Denmark	The galeas was in collision with Grossherzogin von Oldenburg ( Grand Duchy of Oldenburg) in the North Sea and was presumed to have foundered. A crew member was rescued by Grossherzogin von Oldenburg. To Gezusters was on a voyage from Norrköping, Sweden to an English port.

== 28 November ==
List of shipwrecks: 28 November 1856
Ship	State	Description
Gebbina	Sweden	The ship was driven ashore at Höganäs.
Traffic	United Kingdom	The schooner caught fire at Thurso, Caithness and was scuttled. She was severely damaged.
Umeå	Sweden	The steamship sank near Sundsvall with the loss of nineteen of the 34 people on board.

== 29 November ==
List of shipwrecks: 29 November 1856
Ship	State	Description
Alma	France	The ship was wrecked at Karabourno, Ottoman Empire with the loss of three of her crew. She was on a voyage from Sulina to Constantinople.
Arab	United Kingdom	The barque was wrecked on the Kentish Knock. Her crew was rescued by the smack Scout (United Kingdom). Arab was on a voyage from Sunderland, County Durham to London.
Copia	United Kingdom	The schooner was wrecked at Cherbourg, Seine-Inférieure, France. She was on a voyage from Havre de Grâce, Seine-Inférieure to Guernsey, Channel Islands. She was later refloated and towed in to Cherbourg, where she was condemned.
Cornucopia	(United Kingdom of Great Britain and Ireland) British North America	The ship was abandoned in the Atlantic Ocean. Her crew were rescued by Eliza Fox (United Kingdom). Cornucopia was on a voyage from Ardrossan, Ayrshire to Yarmouth, Nova Scotia.
Quebec	United Kingdom	The brig departed from West Hartlepool, County Durham for Dieppe, Seine-Inférieure, France. No further trace, presumed foundered with the loss of all hands.
Toeval	Netherlands	The ship was driven ashore and wrecked near Castricum, North Holland. Her crew were rescued. She was on a voyage from Harlingen, Friesland to Great Yarmouth, Norfolk, United Kingdom.
Waterwitch	United Kingdom	The brig ran aground on the West Rocks, off Harwich, Essex. She was refloated and resumed her voyage.

== 30 November ==
List of shipwrecks: 30 November 1856
Ship	State	Description
Albion	United Kingdom	The ship ran aground on the Herd Sand, in the North Sea off the coast of County Durham. She was on a voyage from Dundee, Forfarshire to South Shields, County Durham. She was refloated and taken in to South Shields.
Ann Elizabeth	United Kingdom	The schooner was run down and sunk in the English Channel off Folkestone, Kent by the steamship Loire (United Kingdom). Her crew were rescued by Loire.
Ashton	United Kingdom	The Humber Keel sank in the Queen's Dock, Hull, Yorkshire. Nobody was on board at the time.
Caroline Liebart	Prussia	The ship ran aground on the Hattarp Reef, in the Baltic Sea. She was on a voyage from Liverpool, Lancashire, United Kingdom to Memel. She was refloated on 4 December and resumed her voyage.
Concord	United Kingdom	The brig ran aground on the West Rocks, off Harwich, Essex. She was on a voyage from the Baltic to London. She was refloated with the assistance of four smacks and resumed her voyage.
George Forster	Danzig	The ship ran aground on the Goodwin Sands, Kent, United Kingdom and was abandoned. She was on a voyage from Danzig to Toulon, Var, France. She was subsequently found to be severely hogged.
Jens Hansen Lund	Denmark	The schooner brig was wrecked near "Madsbol". She was on a voyage from Hartlepool, County Durham to Kalundborg, Denmark.
Scotia	United Kingdom	The schooner ran aground on the Skullmartin Rocks, in Belfast Lough. She was on a voyage from Glasgow, Renfrewshire to Caernarfon. She was refloated the next day and beached. Scotia was subsequently taken in to Ballywalter, County Down in a severely damaged condition.
Sunda	United Kingdom	The ship struck the Rock Dover and was damaged. She was taken in to Jersey, Channel Islands on 2 December.

== Unknown date ==
List of shipwrecks: Unknown date in November 1856
Ship	State	Description
Alma	Norway	The barque was wrecked near Gallipoli, Ottoman Empire before 17 November.
Calabar	United Kingdom	The ship ran aground in the Gulf of Martaban. She was on a voyage from Rangoon, Burma to Calcutta, India. She was refloated and completed her voyage, arriving on 8 November.
Carl August	Norway	The ship was driven ashore at Donna Nook, Lincolnshire, United Kingdom before 17 November. She was on a voyage from Christiania to Wisbech, Cambridgeshire, United Kingdom. She was consequently condemned.
Dee	United Kingdom	The Mersey Flat was driven ashore between Rhyl, Denbighshire and the Point of Ayr, Flintshire. She broke up on 12 November.
Deluri	Flag unknown	The ship was driven ashore on the Dutch coast before 7 November. Her crew were rescued.
Ellerslie	United Kingdom	The ship was driven ashore at Kronstadt, Russia before 14 November.
Enterprise	United Kingdom	The ship ran aground on the Diamond Reef, off the coast of New York, United States. She was on a voyage from New York City to Liverpool, Lancashire. She was refloated and put back to New York City.
Esmerelda	France	The ship was wrecked in the Black Sea before 8 November.
Hiram	United Kingdom	The schooner was wrecked near Tétouan, Morocco before 17 November.
Jane and Catherine	United Kingdom	The ship was driven ashore whilst on a voyage from Stettin to Dundee, Forfarshire. She was refloated and put in to Gothenburg, Sweden, where she arrived on 21 November in a leaky condition.
Kertch	Russia	The ship was driven ashore at Kronstadt. She was on a voyage from Saint Petersburg to London. She was refloated on 17 November.
Lady Franklin	United States	The full-rigged ship foundered before 25 November.
Leopoldina	Portugal	The ship ran aground on the Brake Sand. She was on a voyage from Porto to Riga, Russia. She was refloated on 6 November and taken in to Ramsgate, Kent, United Kingdom in a derelict condition.
Louisa	United Kingdom	The ship was lost off the coast of Norway. Her crew were rescued. She was on a voyage from Saint Petersburg to Liverpool.
Lykkens Prove	Norway	The ship was wrecked off Nordkyn. Her crew were rescued.
Lyra	United Kingdom	The ship ran aground on the Droogden, in the Baltic Sea. She was on a voyage from Copenhagen, Denmark to Memel, Prussia. She was refloated and complete her voyage, arriving on 16 November in a leaky condition.
Magdalena	United Kingdom	The brig was driven ashore near "Rosnaes", Norway. She was consequently condemned.
Medomac	Flag unknown	The ship was wrecked on the Banjaard Sand, in the North Sea off the coast of Walcheren, Zeeland, Netherlands. She was on a voyage from Rangoon, Burma to Queenstown, County Cork.
Minerva	United Kingdom	The ship was driven ashore on Skagen, Denmark. She was on a voyage from Dublin to a Baltic port. She was refloated and taken in to Gothenburg, Sweden in a disabled condition.
Oliveira V. Santana	Portugal	The ship was driven ashore at Gravelines, Nord, France in late November. She was on a voyage from Hamburg to Lisbon.
Paxton	United Kingdom	The ship was driven ashore on Islr Madame, Nova Scotia, British North America. She was on a voyage from Shediac, New Brunswick, British North America to Liverpool. Having been ashore for five days, she had been refloated by 19 November. Paxton was taken in to Charlottetown, Prince Edward Island, British North America.
Phoenix	(Russian Empire) Grand Duchy of Finland	The ship ran aground on the Longsand before 6 November. Her crew were rescued.
Tam O'Shanter	United Kingdom	The ship ran aground off Harwich. She was on a voyage from Odesa to Harwich. She was refloated.
Tartar	United Kingdom	The schooner was wrecked on the Goodwin Sands, Kent before 8 November.
Thomas and Elizabeth	United Kingdom	The ship was wrecked on the Helena Bank, in the Sea of Azov. She was on a voyage from Taganrog, Russia to an English port.
Thomas Jefferson	United States	The ship was destroyed by fire at New Orleans, Louisiana.
Troy	United Kingdom	The ship ran aground on the Diamond Reef and sank. She was on a voyage from New York City to Glasgow, Renfrewshire.
William France	United Kingdom	The steamship ran aground near Falkenberg, Sweden. She was on a voyage from Hull to a Baltic port. She was refloated and taken in to Copenhagen, Denmark, arriving on 13 November.
