= Winter Queen =

Winter Queen may refer to:

- The Winter Queen (novel), a 1998 novel in the Erast Fandorin series by Boris Akunin
- The Winter Queen (1910), a historical novel by Marie Hay
- "The Winter Queen", a series of the BBC radio programme Pilgrim
- Elizabeth Stuart, Queen of Bohemia (1596–1662), wife of Frederick V of the Palatinate, nicknamed "Winter Queen"
- Kohmi Hirose (born 1966), Japanese pop singer, also nicknamed "Winter Queen" (冬の女王, Fuyu no Joō)

== See also ==
- White Witch
- Snow Queen (disambiguation)
