= Queens (novel) =

1984 novel by Pickles

- First edition
- Author: Pickles
- Language: English
- Genre: Novel
- Publisher: Quartet Books
- Publication date: 29 October 1984
- Publication place: United Kingdom
- Media type: Print (Hardback)
- Pages: 289 pp
- ISBN: 0-7043-0038-9
- OCLC: 14716754

Queens is a novel, written in 1984 by an author under the apparent pseudonym "Pickles," which describes gay life in London. The author was Stephen Pickles, who at the time was working as an editor at Quartet Books, the publisher of the novel, with responsibility for its Encounters series.

== Style ==
The novel is written in a variety of styles:third-person, omniscient narrator, overheard dialogue, and epistolary. In many ways the novel reads like journalism as it mentions numerous real-life bars, pubs, and cruising spots, as well as other less anecdotally gay parts of London. Heaven, the Coleherne, and The Bell on Pentonville Road are just three of the main gay locations mentioned in the novel. In some regards, due to the absurdist tone of the novel's overall narration it could be considered to be written in mockumentary style. The omniscient narrator appears to have a pessimistic and ultimately unamused opinion of the characters described which contributes greatly to the novel's comedic value.

Though the narration is choppy the main focus appears to be that of a specific set of characters that are both overlaid and interlinked in one way or the other. The exact identity of each character requires close observation on the reader's part as most characters are initially introduced under an alias (usually of a female variety) or referred to by the author as what type of "queen" they are. Most of the "queens" mentioned in the novel's exordial phases have their stories elaborated further. Scenes in which their way of conduct and process of thinking is demonstrated in one narrative mode or the other. Some of the "queens" stories feature frequently throughout the story however the only consistent plot line is the epistolary styled narration of a young early twenty something named Ben and his courtship and love affair with an aspiring male model Danny.

== Literary significance and reception ==
It was "lambasted by the gay press for its allegedly 'negative' portrayal of London's gay community". Part of the controversy was due to the depiction of characters in the novel. Many are lonely, bored or superficial. The author's own interviews contributed to the controversy, both for his insistence that he needn't present an affirmative picture of gay life in London and also for his unwillingness to publicly come out.

The novel has been described as "a funny, and kind of mean, taxonomy, of gay types in London in the Thatcher years.". Instead of names, the author often refers to characters by their position in gay life: Clone, Opera Queen, Northern Queen, Leather Queen, City Queen, Rent Boy, Insidious Queen. The author also accepts genderfucking names that gay men use for each other: Doris Mavis, Gloria.
