= Gyroscope (automobile) =

Defunct American motor vehicle manufacturer

The Gyroscope was an American brass era automobile built in Detroit, Michigan first by the Blomstrom Manufacturing Company in 1908, and then the Lion Motor Car Company in Adrian, Michigan in 1909. The Gyroscope was so named because of its engine, a horizontal opposed two-cylinder engine, which had a horizontal flywheel. It was claimed the vehicle increased stability and prevented skidding with this powertrain setup. Although other companies had this type of layout, the Gyroscope was the only one to claim its stability effect. The 16 hp engine connected to a friction transmission and shaft drive, with three body styles available.
