= Queen of the South =

Queen of the South may refer to:

== People ==
- Queen of the South (biblical reference), an alternative title for the Queen of Sheba used in the New Testament
- "Queen of the South", a nickname for Kyrgyzstani stateswoman Kurmanjan Datka

== Places ==
- The nickname for the town of Dumfries, Scotland

== Arts, entertainment, and media ==
- The Queen of the South (novel), the English title of La Reina del Sur, a 2002 Spanish novel by Arturo Pérez-Reverte
  - La Reina del Sur (telenovela), a 2011 Spanish-language telenovela produced by the United States-based television network Telemundo based on the novel
  - Queen of the South (TV series), an American television series adaptation of the telenovela
- "Queen of the South", a song by the Scottish record producer Bill Drummond on the 1986 album The Man
- "Queen of the South", a song on the 1993 album Liberation by The Divine Comedy

== Sports ==
- Queen of the South F.C., a Scottish professional football club in Dumfries
- Queen of the South Stakes, a South Australian Jockey Club horse race

== See also ==
- Queen City of the South, a moniker for Cebu City, Philippines
