= Queen's College =

Queen's College, Queens' College or Queens College may refer to:

== Colleges within universities ==
- Queens' College, Cambridge, University of Cambridge, England
- Queen's College, Melbourne, Australia
- Queens College, City University of New York, US
- Queen's College, Newfoundland, affiliated to the Memorial University of Newfoundland, Canada
- The Queen's College, Oxford, University of Oxford, England

== Other colleges ==
- Queen's College, Birmingham, a predecessor college of the University of Birmingham, England
- Queen's College, Edgbaston, now the Queen’s Foundation, a theological college in Birmingham, England
- Queen's College, Edinburgh (active 1841–1842), part of the Edinburgh Extramural School of Medicine, Scotland
- The Queen's College, Glasgow, which merged with Glasgow Polytechnic in 1993 to form Glasgow Caledonian University, Scotland

== Schools ==
- Queen's College, St James
- Queen's College, Colombo, Sri Lanka, now Royal College, Colombo
- Queen's College, Georgetown
- Queen's College, Hobart, Australia, now The Hutchins School
- Queen's College, Hong Kong, the first government school in Hong Kong
- Queen's College, Lagos, Nigeria
- Queen's College, London, England
- Queen's College, Mallorca, a National Association of British Schools school in Spain
- Queen's College, Nassau, Bahamas
- Queen's College, North Adelaide, defunct boys' school in South Australia
- Queen's College Boys' High School, Queenstown, Eastern Cape, South Africa
- Queen's College, Taunton, England

== Universities ==
- Queen's College (1845–1908), now University of Galway, Ireland
- Queen's College (1841–1877), now Queen's University at Kingston, Ontario, Canada
- Queen's College (1845–1908), now Queen's University Belfast, Northern Ireland
- Queen's College (1845–1908), now University College Cork, Ireland
- Queen's College (1954–1967), now University of Dundee, Scotland
- Queen's College (1766–1825), now Rutgers University, New Jersey, US
- Queens College (1912–2002), now Queens University of Charlotte, North Carolina, US

== See also ==
- Queen's University (disambiguation)
- Queen's campus (disambiguation)
- Queen Elizabeth College
