= Queening =

Queening may refer to:

- Promotion in chess of a pawn to a queen
- Facesitting, a sexual practice
- Queen cat birthing
