= Queen (1795 ship) =

History

Great Britain
- Owner: 1796:Stewart & Co.; 1797:Urquhart & Co.; 1799:P. Dawson; 1803:Sherriff; c.1810:Ward
- Builder: Patrick Beatson, Quebec
- Launched: 1795
- Fate: Last listed in 1813
- Notes: Three decks

General characteristics
- Tons burthen: 484, or 497, (bm)
- Length: 115 ft 10 in (35.3 m) (overall); 92 ft 10 1/4 in (28.3 m) (keel)
- Beam: 31 ft 4 in (9.6 m)
- Depth of hold: 13 ft 2 1/2 in (4.0 m)
- Propulsion: Sail
- Complement: 1796:40; 1801:36
- Armament: 1796:12 × 4&6-pounder guns; 1801:16 ×9&12-pounder guns; 1808:4 × 6-pounder guns

Queen was launched at Quebec in 1795. She made three voyages for the British East India Company (EIC) and then became a West Indiaman, trading between London and West Indies. She was last listed in 1813.

== Career ==
Queen enters Lloyd's Register in 1796 with C. Venner, master, Stewart & Co., owners, and trade London—Cape of Good Hope.

EIC voyage #1 (1796): Captain Corbyn Morris Venner acquired a letter of marque on 18 February 1796. Venner sailed from Portsmouth on 6 March 1796, bound for the Cape of Good Hope and St Helena. Queen reached Porto Praya on 6 April and arrived at the Cape on 28 May. Homeward bound, she returned to St Helena on 17 September and arrived at the Downs on 7 December. On 10 December she landed a cargo of wheat.

The EIC had the shipbuilder Peter Mestaer measure Queen before her next voyage for the Company. She also underwent some repairs.

EIC voyage #2 (1797–1798): On 10 February 1797, the EIC accepted a tender from Robert Charnock for Queen for one voyage at a rate of £22 15s per ton of burthen, plus £11 7s per ton of "surplus".

Captain John Fam Timins was Queen's master for her second and third voyage for the EIC. He appears not to have acquired a letter of marque. Timins left Portsmouth on 5 Jun 1797, bound for Bengal. Queen reached the Cape on 1 October and arrived at Calcutta on 30 December. Homeward bound, she was at Kedgeree on 23 February 1798 and Saugor on 10 March. She reached the Cape on 15 June and St Helena on 6 August, and arrived at the Downs on 18 October.

Various issues of Lloyd's Register indicate that Queen underwent damage repairs and a thorough repair in 1799.

EIC voyage #3 (1799–1801): Timins sailed on 26 June 1799 for Madras. Homeward bound, Queen left Madras on 10 October 1800, reached the Cape on 2 December and St Helena on 29 January 1801, and arrived at the Downs on 10 April. For this voyage Queen's ownership changed from Urquhart to P. Dawson.

On her return to England, Queen began trading with the West Indies under a new master, but still with Pl Dawson as owner. Her trade became London–Surinam. On 10 June 1801, Captain Alfred Nicholas acquired a letter of marque. On 21 June Queen sailed from Portsmouth as part of a convoy for the West Indies under the escort of HMS Garland. Garland was also conveying Admiral Robert Montagu to Jamaica.

Lloyd's Register for 1803 shows Queen's master changing from Nicholas to W. Stonehouse, and her owner from Dawson to Sherriff & Co.

Although there was a Queen that was returning from Demarara to London when she had to put into Bermuda in distress. There this ship was surveyed, condemned as unseaworthy, and sold for breaking up. However, her master was Pearson, and it is not clear from either Lloyd's Register or the Register of shipping which vessel this was.

Both registers continued to carry Queen for some more years, with changes to the information, suggesting that they were not simply maintaining stale data. The data below are from Lloyd's Register.

Year	Master	Owner	Trade
1809	Stonehouse; Jayle	Sheriff	London—Surinam
1810			Missing pages
1811	Harrison	Ward	London—Buenos Aires
1812	Harrison	Ward	London—Buenos Aires
1813	Harrison	Ward	London—Buenos Aires

On 3 April 1811 Queen, Harrison, master, was sailing from Buenos Aires when she had to put into Rio de Janeiro because of leaking. Some of her cargo had to be landed.

Queen is no longer listed in 1814.
