= HMS Queen =

Several ships of the English navy and Royal Navy have been named Queen. It is one of the oldest ship names of the Royal Navy dating from the time of Henry III of England.

- English ship Queen (1225) was a ship built in 1225. She is mentioned in records for some 10 or 12 years after that year. Her fate is unknown.
- HMS Queen was a 100-gun first rate launched in 1673 as Royal Charles and renamed Queen in 1694, then renamed Royal George in 1715. She was renamed Royal Anne in 1756 and was broken up in 1767.
- HMS Queen (1769) was a 98-gun second rate launched in 1769. She was reduced to 74 guns in 1811 and was broken up in 1821.
- HMS Queen (1839) was a 110-gun first rate launched in 1839. In 1859 the ship was fitted with a screw propeller and reduced to 86 guns. She was broken up in 1871.
- HMS Queen (1902) was a Formidable-class pre-dreadnought battleship launched in 1902. She was sold in 1920 and broken up in 1921.
- Queen IV (1902) was the paddle steamer Queen, requisitioned and renamed in 1916 as an auxiliary patrol vessel and, later, minesweeper.
- HMS Queen (D19) was a Bogue-class escort carrier, formerly USS St. Andrews. She was launched in 1943 and transferred to the Royal Navy that year. She was returned to the United States Navy in 1946.

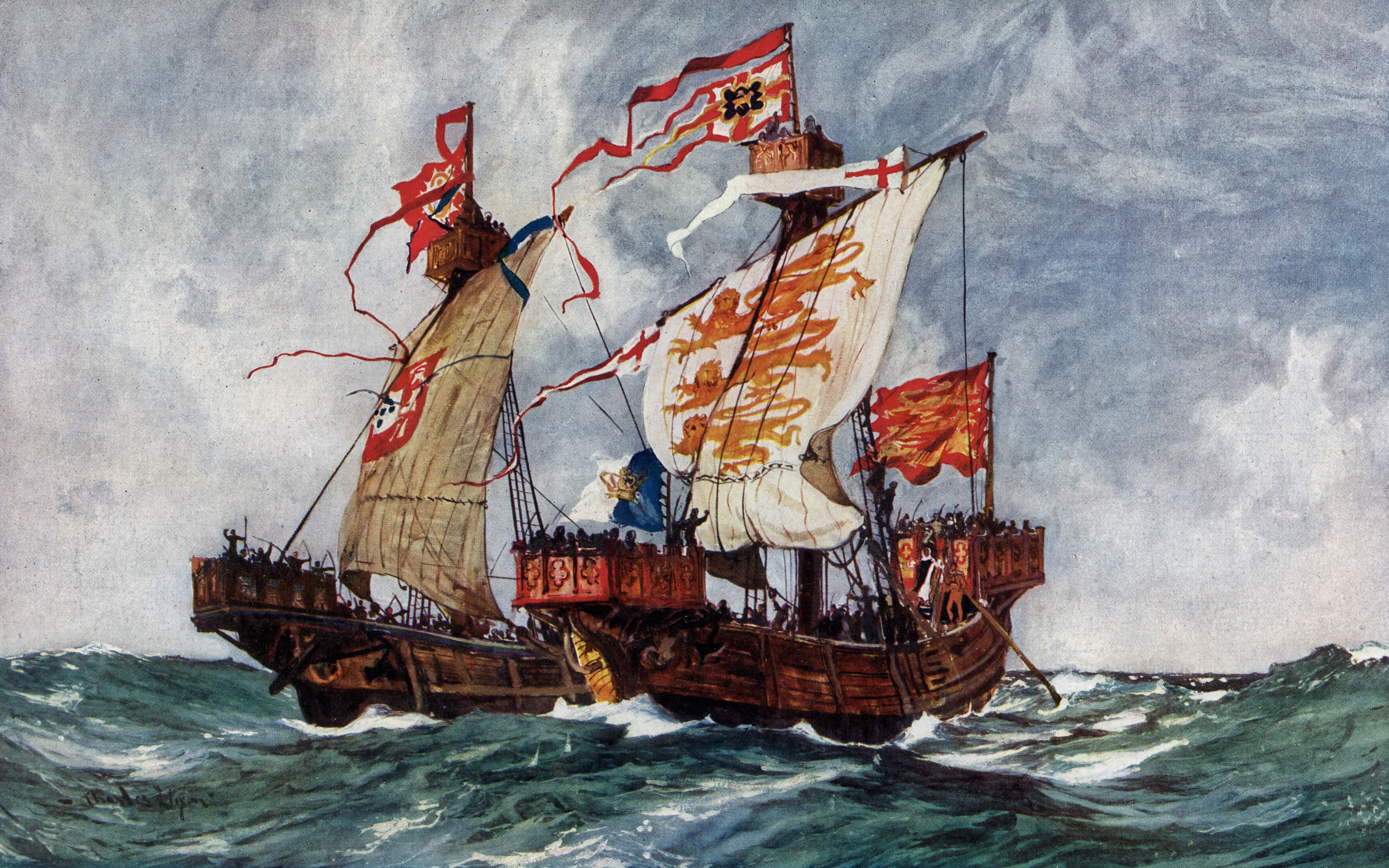
Painting of Queen (1225) (centre) by Charles Dixon

== Other ships ==
- HMCS Queen is the Canadian Naval Reserve Division in Regina, Saskatchewan. The battle honours of all HM Ships Queen have been inherited by HMCS Queen.
- Queen was an Indian service paddle sloop launched in 1839 and listed until 1860.

== Battle honours ==
- Ushant 1781
- First of June 1794
- Groix Island 1795
- Crimea 1854–55
- Dardanelles 1915
- Atlantic 1944
- Norway 1945
- Arctic 1945

== See also ==
- HMS Queen Charlotte
- HMS Queen Elizabeth
- HMS Queen Mab
- HMS Queen Mary
- HMS Queenborough
