= Elizabeth =

Elizabeth or Elisabeth may refer to:

== People ==
- Elizabeth (given name), a female given name (including people with that name)
  - Saint Elizabeth (disambiguation), lists various saints named Elizabeth or Elisabeth
    - Elizabeth, mother of John the Baptist, biblical figure
  - Empress Elisabeth (disambiguation), lists various empresses named Elisabeth or Elizabeth
  - Queen Elizabeth (disambiguation), lists various queens named Elizabeth
  - Princess Elizabeth (disambiguation), lists various princesses named Elizabeth

== Film and television ==
- Elizabeth R, 1971
- Elizabeth (TV series), 1980
- Elizabeth (film), 1998
- Elizabeth: The Golden Age, 2007

== Music ==
- Elisabeth (Elisabeth Andreassen album)
- Elisabeth (Zach Bryan album)
- Elizabeth (band), an American psychedelic rock/progressive rock band active from 1967 to 1970
- Elizabeth (Lisa album)
- Elizabeth, an album by Killah Priest
- "Elizabeth" (Ghost song)
- "Elizabeth" (The Statler Brothers song)
- Elizabeth (soundtrack), to the 1998 film

== Places ==
=== Australia ===
- City of Elizabeth
  - Elizabeth, South Australia
- Elizabeth Reef, a coral reef in the Tasman Sea

=== Bahamas ===
- Elizabeth (Bahamas Parliament constituency)

=== United States ===
- Elizabeth, Arkansas, an unincorporated community
- Elizabeth, Colorado, a town
- Elizabeth, Georgia, a former municipality
- Elizabeth, Illinois, a village
- Elizabeth, Indiana, a town
- Hopkinsville, Kentucky, originally known as Elizabeth
- Elizabeth, Louisiana, a village
- Elizabeth Islands, constituting the town of Gosnold, Massachusetts
- Elizabeth, Minnesota, a city
- Elizabeth, New Jersey, largest city with the name in the U.S.
- Elizabeth City, North Carolina, a city
- Elizabeth (Charlotte neighborhood), in Charlotte, North Carolina
- Elizabeth, Pennsylvania, a borough
- Elizabeth Township, Pennsylvania (disambiguation)
- Elizabeth, West Virginia, a town

== Ships ==
- Elisabeth (schooner), several ships
- Elizabeth (ship), a list of ships named Elizabeth
- Elizabeth-class ship of the line, 74-gun third-rates of the British Royal Navy
- HMS Elizabeth, several ships
- Elizabeth (freighter), an American freighter that was wrecked off New York harbor in 1850; see Margaret Fuller § Death

== Other uses ==
- Élisabeth (novel), a 1946 novel by Éric Rohmer
- Elisabeth (musical), a 1992 Viennese German-language musical written by Michael Kunze and composed by Sylvester Levay, about the life of Elisabeth of Bavaria
- Elisabeth (Antwerp premetro station)
- Elisabeth metro station, (a part of) a metro station in Brussels
- "Elizabeth", a poem by Edgar Allan Poe
- Elizabeth (BioShock), a fictional character in BioShock

== See also ==
- Elisaveta (disambiguation)
- Elizabeth I (disambiguation)
- Elizabeth II (disambiguation)
- Elizabeth Cup (disambiguation)
- Elizabeth Stakes (disambiguation)
- Elizebeth, given name
- Elizaveta (disambiguation)
- Jelisaveta (disambiguation)
- Lisbeth (disambiguation)
- Tropical Storm Elizabeta, a 1987 Indian Ocean tropical cyclone
- Tropical Storm Elizabetha, a 1992 Indian Ocean tropical cyclone
