= Isabel II (disambiguation) =

Isabel II (1830–1904; r. 1833–1868) was Queen of Spain.

Isabel II or Isabella II may also refer to:

- Isabel II barrio-pueblo, Vieques, Puerto Rico
- Isabella II of Jerusalem (1212–1228; r. 1212–1228), Queen of Jerusalem
- Spanish ship Isabel II, various Spanish Navy ships

== See also ==
- Elizabeth II (disambiguation)
- Isabella I (disambiguation)
- Isabella of Castile (disambiguation)
- Isabella of Spain (disambiguation)
- Queen Isabella (disambiguation)
