= List of ships named Elizabeth =

List of ships with the same or similar names

Numerous vessels have borne the name Elizabeth:

- Elizabeth (1786 ship) was launched at Bermuda in 1786 (or 1790). She first appears in Lloyd's Register in 1802. She then made four voyages as a slave ship, during the second of which a French privateer captured her; the British Royal Navy quickly recaptured her. After the end of the British slave trade in 1807, she spent a little over a year as a hired armed tender under contract to the British Royal Navy. She returned to mercantile service trading with Madeira or Africa, until in late in 1809 another French privateer captured her.
- Elizabeth (1798 ship) was launched at Hamburg in 1798. British owners purchased her in 1813. She traded with the Mediterranean and elsewhere. She was at the Cape of Good Hope in November 1817 when a group of convicts and army deserters took possession of her. They ran her onshore a few days later, wrecking her.
- Elizabeth (1798 Lancaster ship) was launched at Lancaster in 1798. She made five complete voyages as a slave ship in the triangular trade in enslaved people. Spanish privateers captured her in 1805 while she was on her sixth slave voyage after she had embarked slaves.
- Elizabeth (1801 ship) was launched at Liverpool in 1801. She made one voyage for the British East India Company (EIC). She wrecked, with great loss of life, in December 1810 early in the outward leg of a second voyage to India for the EIC.
- HMS Avenger (1803) was a sloop-of-war, previously the civilian vessel Elizabeth, launched in 1801 at Bridlington. The British Royal Navy purchased her in 1803. She foundered in Heligoland Bight, off the Weser, on 5 December 1803.
- Elizabeth (1805 ship) was a merchant ship built at Dartmouth, England in 1805. She made one voyage transporting convicts from England to Australia. She was condemned in 1838.
- Elizabeth (1806 ship) was launched at Liverpool. A French privateer captured her in 1807 while she was on her first voyage as a slave ship.
- Elizabeth (1809 Bristol ship) was launched at Bristol in 1809. She was originally a West Indiaman, but she wrecked in October 1819 at Table Bay while sailing from Bombay to London.
- Elizabeth (1809 ship) was a merchant ship built at Chepstow, Wales in 1809. She made three voyages transporting convicts from England and Ireland to Australia. Elizabeth was no longer listed after 1832 and may have been lost in 1831.
- Elizabeth (1813 ship) was launched at Hull in 1813. She made one round-trip to Bengal for the EIC. She was last listed in 1841.
- Elizabeth (1816 ship) was a merchant ship built at Calcutta, British India, in 1816. She made one voyage transporting convicts from Ireland to Australia. She also made one voyage for the EIC. This was the last voyage that any vessel made for the EIC. Elizabeth is no longer listed after 1834.
- Elizabeth (1825 New Brunswick barque) was a merchant ship built at New Brunswick, Nova Scotia, in 1825. She made one voyage transporting convicts from Singapore to Australia.
- Elizabeth (1825 Yarmouth brig) was a merchant ship built at Great Yarmouth, England, in 1825. On one voyage she transported convicts from Hobart Town to Sydney, Australia.
- Elizabeth (1830 ship) was a merchant ship built at Singapore in 1830. She made one voyage transporting convicts from the Swan River Colony to Sydney, Australia. She wrecked in 1839.

== See also ==
- Elizabeth-class ship of the line, 74-gun third-rates of the British Royal Navy
- HMS Elizabeth - one of 12 ships of the British Royal Navy
- USS Elizabeth - one of two ships of the United States Navy
- Queen Elizabeth (ship), ships named Queen Elizabeth
- Elizabeth (disambiguation)
