= The Queen Elizabeth =

The Queen Elizabeth can refer to:

- HMS Queen Elizabeth (for several ships of that name)
- RMS Queen Elizabeth
- Queen Elizabeth 2
- Queen Elizabeth Hotel

== See also ==
- Queen Elizabeth (disambiguation)
