= Empress Isabella =

Empress Isabella or Empress Isabel may refer to:

- Isabella of England (1214–1241), empress consort of Frederick II, Holy Roman Emperor
- Isabella of Portugal (1503–1539), empress consort of Charles V, Holy Roman Emperor
- Isabel Moctezuma (1509/1510–1550/1551), empress consort of Cuitláhuac, later of Cuauhtémoc, Aztec emperors

== See also ==
- Queen Isabella (disambiguation)
- Empress Elisabeth (disambiguation)
- Isabel, Princess Imperial of Brazil (1846–1921), titular Empress of Brazil
