= Lisbeth =

- Gender: Female

Origin
- Origin: Scandinavia, Germany

Other names
- Variant form: Elisabeth

Lisbeth or Lizbeth is a feminine given name, a variant of Elizabeth. It may be:

== Notable people ==
- Lisbeth Grönfeldt Bergman (born 1948), Swedish politician of the Moderate Party
- Lisbeth Holand (born 1946), Norwegian politician of the Socialist Left Party
- Lisbeth Klastrup (born 1970), Danish scholar
- Lisbeth Lenton (born 1985), Australian retired competition swimmer
- Lizbeth MacKay (born 1949), American actress
- Lizbeth Marano (born 1950), American artist and photographer
- Lizbeth Medina (2007–2023), American female murder victim
- Lisbeth Movin (1917–2011), Danish actress and director
- Lisbeth Nypan (1610–1670), Norwegian alleged witch
- Lisbeth Palme (1931–2018), Swedish children's psychologist, chairwoman for UNICEF
- Lisbeth Cathrine Amalie Rose (1738–1793), Danish actress
- Lisbeth Scott (born 1978), American singer-songwriter
- Lisbeth Stuer-Lauridsen (born 1968), Danish former badminton player
- Lisbeth Torfing (born 1987), Danish politician
- Lisbeth Zwerger (born 1954), Austrian illustrator of children's books

== Fictional characters ==
- Lisbeth, character from Sword Art Online
- Lisbeth "Bette" Fischer, title character of Honoré de Balzac's La Cousine Bette
- Lisbeth Salander, fictional heroine from The Girl with the Dragon Tattoo
- Lisbeth Brami, character in the Tara Duncan novels by Sophie Audouin-Mamikonian

== See also ==
- Elisabeth (disambiguation)
