= QE =

QE may refer to:

== Buildings ==
- Queen Elizabeth Hospital, Hong Kong, sometimes abbreviated as QE
- Queen Elizabeth Sixth Form College (QE), Darlington, County Durham, England
- Queen Elizabeth's School, Wimborne Minster (QE), Dorset, England
- Queen Elizabeth Hospital Birmingham, a major hospital often abbreviated to QE

== People ==
- Queen Elizabeth (disambiguation), various queens, including
  - Elizabeth I (1533–1603; r. 1558–1603), Queen of England
  - Queen Elizabeth the Queen Mother (1900–2002), queen consort of George VI and mother of Elizabeth II
  - Elizabeth II (1926–2022; r. 1952–2022), Queen of the United Kingdom

== Science and technology ==
- Crossair Europe, a former airline whose IATA airline designator was QE
- Quantum efficiency, a measure of a photodetector's electrical response to light
- Queen Elizabeth (ship), various ships
- Query expansion, the process of reformulating a query to improve retrieval performance

== Other uses ==
- Quantitative easing, a monetary policy intended to stimulate an economy in recession

== See also ==
- QE1 (disambiguation)
- QE2 (disambiguation)
- QE3 (disambiguation)
