= Elizabeth of Great Britain =

Elizabeth of Great Britain or Elizabeth of the United Kingdom may refer to:

- Elizabeth II (1926–2022), Queen of the United Kingdom
- Princess Elizabeth of Great Britain (1741–1759), grandchild of George II and sister of George III
- Princess Elizabeth of the United Kingdom (1770–1840), third daughter of George III
- Princess Elizabeth of Clarence (1820–1821), second legitimate daughter of Prince William, Duke of Clarence (later William IV)
- Elizabeth Bowes-Lyon (1900–2002), queen consort of George VI

== See also ==
- Princess Lilibet of Sussex (born 2021), granddaughter of Charles III and only daughter of Prince Harry, Duke of Sussex
- Elizabeth II (disambiguation)
- Elizabeth of England (disambiguation)
- Elizabeth of Scotland (disambiguation)
- Elizabeth the Queen Mother (disambiguation)
- Princess Elizabeth (disambiguation)
- Queen Elizabeth (disambiguation)
