= Queen Elizabeth (ship) =

Queen Elizabeth (ship) may refer to any one of many ships:

- HMS Queen Elizabeth, either of two ships of that name, or one planned ship that was cancelled
- RMS Queen Elizabeth
- Queen Elizabeth 2
- MS Queen Elizabeth
- Queen Elizabeth (1811 ship) was launched at Pownall Bay, Prince Edward Island. She sailed to England, transferred her registry to England, and was last listed in 1831.

== See also ==
- Queen Elizabeth class (disambiguation)
- Queen Elizabeth (disambiguation)
- Elizabeth (ship), ships named Elizabeth
