= Elizabeth of Sweden =

Elizabeth of Sweden (Swedish: Elisabet or Elsa) or Isabella of Sweden may refer to:

- Elizabeth of Denmark (1485–1555), princess of Sweden
- Isabella of Austria (1501–1526), queen consort of Sweden, also called Elizabeth
- Princess Elizabeth of Sweden (1549–1597), princess of Sweden and daughter of Gustav I of Sweden
- Elizabeth (Isabella) (1564–1566), princess of Sweden and daughter of John III of Sweden
- Elizabeth Sabina (1582–1585), princess of Sweden and daughter of Charles IX of Sweden
- Elsa Beata Brahe (Elizabeth Beatrice) (1629–1653), princess of Sweden and consort of Adolph John I, Count Palatine of Kleeburg

== See also ==
- Princess Elizabeth (disambiguation)
- Princess Isabella (disambiguation)
