= Elizabeth Cup =

Elizabeth Cup may refer to:

- Queen Elizabeth II Cup (Hong Kong), a horse race in Hong Kong, China
- Queen Elizabeth II Cup (Japan), a horse race in Kyoto, Japan; formerly held as the Queen Elizabeth II Commemorative Cup until 2012
- Queen Elizabeth II Challenge Cup Stakes, a horse race in Kentucky, USA
- Princess Elizabeth Challenge Cup, a rowing event for Eights at the Henley Royal Regatta in Henley, UK

== See also ==
- S. E. Cupp (S. Elizabeth Cupp)
- Elizabeth (disambiguation)
- Elizabeth Stakes (disambiguation)
- Queen's Cup (disambiguation)
