= Elisabeth of Bavaria (disambiguation) =

Elisabeth of Bavaria (1837–1898) was Empress of Austria as the wife of Emperor Franz Joseph I.

Elisabeth of Bavaria, Elizabeth of Bavaria, or Elisabeth of Wittelsbach may also refer to:

== Wives of the rulers of Bavaria ==
- Elisabeth of Hungary, Duchess of Bavaria (1236–1271), wife of Henry XIII, Duke of Bavaria
- Elisabeth of Sicily, Duchess of Bavaria (1310–1349), wife of Stephen II, Duke of Bavaria
- Isabelle of Lorraine (d. 1335), wife of Louis III, Duke of Bavaria
- Elisabetta Visconti (1374–1432), wife of Ernest, Duke of Bavaria
- Elisabeth of Cleves (1378–1424), wife of Stephen III, Duke of Bavaria
- Elisabeth of Görlitz (1390–1451), wife of John III, Duke of Bavaria
- Elisabeth of Lorraine, Electress of Bavaria (1574–1635), wife of Maximilian I, Elector of Bavaria
- Countess Palatine Elisabeth Auguste of Sulzbach (1721–1794), wife of Charles Theodore, Elector of Bavaria

== Other women ==
- Elisabeth of Bavaria, Queen of Germany (1227–1273), wife of King Conrad IV of Germany
- Elizabeth of Bavaria, Duchess of Austria (1306–1330), first wife of Otto, Duke of Austria
- Isabeau of Bavaria (originally called Elisabeth) (1370–1435), wife of Charles VI of France
- Elisabeth of Bavaria, Electress of Brandenburg (1383–1442), wife of Frederick I, Elector of Brandenburg
- Elisabeth of Bavaria-Landshut, Countess of Württemberg (1419–1451), wife of Ulrich V, Count of Württemberg
- Elisabeth of Bavaria, Electress of Saxony (1443–1484), wife of Ernest, Elector of Saxony
- Elisabeth of Bavaria (1478–1504), Duchess of Bavaria-Landshut
- Elisabeth Ludovika of Bavaria (1801–1873), wife of Frederick William IV of Prussia
- Princess Isabella of Bavaria (1863–1924), daughter of Prince Adalbert of Bavaria (1828–1875)
- Princess Elisabeth Marie of Bavaria (1874–1957), daughter of Prince Leopold of Bavaria
- Elisabeth of Bavaria, Queen of Belgium (1876–1965), wife of King Albert I of Belgium
- Princess Elisabeth Maria of Bavaria, (1913–2005), daughter of Prince Alfons of Bavaria
- Duchess Elisabeth in Bavaria (born 1973), daughter of Prince Max, Duke in Bavaria and Countess Elisabeth, Duchess in Bavaria

== See also ==
- Queen Elizabeth (disambiguation)
- Princess Elizabeth (disambiguation)
