= HMS Elizabeth =

Twelve ships of the Royal Navy have borne the name HMS Elizabeth. Most of these ships have been named in honour of Queen Elizabeth I of England:

- English ship Elizabeth (1514), also known as Great Elizabeth, was a ship purchased in 1514 and wrecked later that year. She had previously been the merchant Salvator.
- English ship Elizabeth Jonas (1559) was a large 56-gun galleon launched in 1559. She was rebuilt in 1597-98. She was sold in 1618.
- English ship Elizabeth (1577) was a 16-gun vessel in service between 1577 and 1588.
- English ship Elizabeth (1647) was a 38-gun frigate launched in 1647. She served during the Second Anglo-Dutch War but was burnt by the Dutch in 1667.
- HMS Elizabeth (1648) was a hoy purchased by the Royalists in 1648. She deserted to the Parliamentarians in 1649 and was sold in 1653.
- HMS Elizabeth (1679) was a third-rate ship of the line launched in 1679. She was rebuilt in 1704, but captured by the French later that year.
- HMS Elizabeth (1706) was a 70-gun third rate launched in 1706. She was rebuilt to carry 64 guns in 1737 and was broken up by 1766.
- HMS Elizabeth (1769) was a 74-gun third-rate ship of the line launched in 1769. She served in the American War of Independence and the French Revolutionary War, and was broken up in 1797.
- HMS Elizabeth (1795) was a 3-gun gunvessel purchased in 1795 and in service until at least 1801.
- HMS Elizabeth (1805 cutter) was a 10-gun cutter captured from the Spanish in 1805. She foundered in 1807.
- HMS Elizabeth (1805) was a 14-gun schooner that HMS Kingfisher captured from the French in 1805. Around 1812 the Navy enlarged and converted her to brig. Elizabeth capsized in 1814.
- HMS Elizabeth (1807) was a 74-gun third-rate ship of the line launched in 1807. She served in the Napoleonic Wars and was broken up in 1820.
- Elizabeth, cutter; 7 January 1812 whilst cruising off Plymouth discovered Deux Freres, from Lorient, which Pelorus had recently captured, and brought Deux Freres into port.

== See also ==
- Elizabeth-class ship of the line, 74-gun third-rates of the Royal Navy
- HMS Queen Elizabeth, Royal Navy shipname
- Elizabeth (ship), ships named Elizabeth
