= Queen Elizabeth-class =

Queen Elizabeth-class may refer to:

- Queen Elizabeth-class battleship, of the early 20th century
- Queen Elizabeth-class aircraft carrier (1960s), planned design of the 1960s
- Queen Elizabeth-class aircraft carrier, a class of two 65,000-tonne aircraft carriers commissioned in 2017 and 2019 respectively

== See also ==
- Elizabeth-class ship of the line, 74-gun third-rates of the British Royal Navy
- Queen Elizabeth (ship)
- Queen Elizabeth (disambiguation)
