= USS Elizabeth =

USS Elizabeth has been the name of more than one United States Navy ship, and may refer to:

- USS Elizabeth (SP-972), a patrol vessel in service from 1917 to 1919
- USS Elizabeth (SP-1092), a patrol vessel commissioned in 1917 and wrecked in 1918

See also

- USS Elizabeth C. Stanton (AP-69)
- USS Elizabeth M. Froelich (SP-380)
