= Portrait of Elizabeth II =

Portrait of Elizabeth II may refer to:

- Coronation portrait of Elizabeth II by Herbert James Gunn (1953–1956)
- Wattle Queen by William Dargie (1954)
- Pietro Annigoni's portraits of Elizabeth II (1955, 1969 and 1972)
- Reigning Queens by Andy Warhol (1985)
- Richard Stone's portraits of Elizabeth II (1992 and 2015)
- The Queen (Justin Mortimer portrait) (1997)
- Her Majesty the Queen by Lucian Freud (2001)
- Depictions of Elizabeth II by Banksy (2001, 2003 and 2012)
- Her Majesty Queen Elizabeth II – An 80th Birthday Portrait by Rolf Harris (2005)
- The Coronation Theatre: Portrait of HM Queen Elizabeth II by Ralph Heimans (2012)
- Beautiful Portrait, The Queen by Damien Hirst (2014)
- Her Majesty Queen Elizabeth II with the Founder of the British Red Cross Henri Dunant by Henry Ward (2016)
- Algorithm Queen by Ai-Da (2022)

== See also ==
- Conversation Piece at the Royal Lodge, Windsor by Herbert James Gunn (1950)
- The Royal Family: A Centenary Portrait by John Wonnacott (2000)
- Mural of Elizabeth II by Jignesh Patel and Yash Patel (2022)
