= Elisabeth of France (disambiguation) =

Élisabeth of France (1764–1794) was the daughter of Louis, Dauphin of France and Marie-Josèphe of Saxony, and sister of Louis XVI.

Elisabeth or Elizabeth of France may also refer to:

- Elisabeth of Valois (1546–1568), daughter of Henry II of France and Catherine de' Medici, and wife of Philip II of Spain
- Elisabeth of France, Queen of Spain (1602–1644), daughter of Henry IV of France and Marie de' Medici, and wife of Philip IV of Spain

== See also ==
- Isabelle of France (disambiguation)
- Princess Elizabeth (disambiguation)
