= Queen mother (disambiguation) =

A queen mother is a widowed queen consort who is also the mother of a reigning monarch.

Queen mother, queenmother, or The Queen Mother may also refer to:

== People ==
=== Royalty ===
- British queen mothers
  - Queen Elizabeth the Queen Mother (1900–2002), queen consort of King George VI and mother of Queen Elizabeth II
- Queen mother, certain female traditional African rulers

=== Other people ===
- Queen Mother Moore (1898–1997), American activist
- Queen Mother of the West, a goddess in Chinese folk religion

== Places ==
- Queen Mother Pedagogical Institute, Tirana, Albania
- Queen Mother Reservoir, Berkshire, England, United Kingdom
- Queen Mother Theatre, Hitchin, Hertfordshire, England, United Kingdom
- Queen Mother Hospital for Animals, Potters Bar, Hertfordshire, England, United Kingdom

== Sports ==
- Queen Mother Champion Chase, a horse race in the United Kingdom
- Queen Mother Memorial Cup, a horse race in Hong Kong

== Other uses ==
- The Queen Mother (film), a 1916 British film

== See also ==
- Queen (disambiguation)
- Mother (disambiguation)
- Elizabeth the Queen Mother (disambiguation)
- Insu, the Queen Mother, a 2011 South Korean television series
