= Annick Gendron =

French painter

- Born: 1939; Châtin, France
- Died: 22 October 2008 (aged 68–69); Saint-Cloud, France
- Known for: Painting
- Movement: Abstract art

Annick Gendron (1939, in Châtin, Nièvre – 22 October 2008, in Saint-Cloud), was a French abstract painter.

== Art ==
Spin painting, oil on Plexiglas by Annick Gendron (1969)

In the 1970s Gendron's use of industrial materials and tools included plastic, glass, hydraulics press and centrifuges. Gendron's painting and thought process has always revolved around using often surprising materials plexiglas, fossils, toy soldier, glitters, sponges. Uncommon themes such as the limits to scientific knowledge and the Pan-European identity are central to her work.

Annick Gendron has been painting and exhibiting since 1965. Her work has been shown at the Raymond Duncan Gallery, at the Bernheim-Jeune Gallery, at the Salon des Indépendants and Surindependant at the Musée d'Art Moderne de la Ville de Paris, at the Salon des Artistes Français at the Grand Palais and the Salon d'Automne in Paris.

== Spin painting ==
At the end of the 1960s she was one of the first artist to use centrifugal force to produce large-sized artworks. Inspired by children's games : spin art, spin painting, her goal was to transcend this modest use to get the most spectacular effects from it. Damien Hirst got the same idea in the 1990s, as her he transcends the original practice, by the use of more spectacular materials, sizes, shapes, and skill improvement.

== Gallery ==
Indoor view of The Galerie Annick Gendron in the 1970s

After winning the ORTF prize in 1971 and the Art Society Medal for Science and Literature, Gendron opened the Annick Gendron Gallery in the 5th arrondissement of Parisin 1973. During a period of 10 years, Gendron exhibited with artists and friends such as Philippe Derome, Eugène de Kermadec, Chu Teh-Chun, Albert Feraud, Ladislas Kijno and 1940s artists and designer as Chana Orloff, Paul Dupré-Lafon, Jean Dunand, André Arbus.

== Notes and references ==
- Galerie des arts (magazine) 1970
- L'Amateur d'Art (magazine) N° 525 - 18 October 1973

== See also ==
- Spin painting
