= Princess Elizabeth =

Princess Elizabeth or Princess Elisabeth may refer to:

== People ==
=== British ===
- Elizabeth of England (disambiguation), lists multiple princesses of England that lived prior to 1707
  - Elizabeth I (1533–1603; r. 1558–1603), known as Princess Elizabeth before her accession
- Elizabeth of Scotland (disambiguation), lists multiple princesses of Scotland that lived prior to 1707
- Elizabeth of Great Britain (disambiguation), lists multiple princesses that have lived since 1707
  - Elizabeth II (1926–2022; r. 1952–2022), known as HRH Princess Elizabeth of York and HRH The Princess Elizabeth before accession to the thrones of the United Kingdom, Canada, Australia, New Zealand, South Africa, Ceylon, and Pakistan in 1952

=== German ===
- Elisabeth of Bavaria (disambiguation), multiple princesses
- Elisabeth of Hesse (disambiguation), multiple princesses
- Princess Elisabeth of Hesse and by Rhine (disambiguation), multiple princesses
- Princess Elisabeth of Saxe-Altenburg (disambiguation), multiple princesses
- Princess Elisabeth of Thurn and Taxis (disambiguation), multiple princesses
- Elisabeth of the Palatinate (1618–1680), philosopher
- Elisabeth Christine of Brunswick-Wolfenbüttel (1691–1750), wife of future Charles VI, Holy Roman Emperor
- Princess Elisabeth Albertine of Saxe-Hildburghausen (1713–1761), daughter of Ernest Frederick I, Duke of Saxe-Hildburghausen, of the German Empire
- Princess Elisabeth of Saxony (1830–1912), wife of Prince Ferdinand, Duke of Genoa
- Princess Elisabeth of Schwarzburg-Rudolstadt (1833–1896), wife of Leopold III, Prince of Lippe
- Elisabeth of Wied (1843–1916), princess of Hohenzollern-Sigmaringen and wife of Carol I of Romania
- Princess Elisabeth of Anhalt (1857–1933), Grand Duchess of Mecklenburg-Strelitz, of the German Empire
- Princess Elisabeth Anna of Prussia (1857–1895), granddaughter of Leopold IV, Duke of Anhalt, of the German Empire
- Princess Elisabeth of Stolberg-Rossla (1885–1969), wife of Duke Johann Albrecht of Mecklenburg of the German Empire

=== Elsewhere ===
- Elisabeth of Bohemia (disambiguation), multiple female royals
- Elizabeth of Denmark (disambiguation), multiple princesses
- Elisabeth of France (disambiguation), multiple female royals, particularly
  - Princess Élisabeth of France (1764–1794), sister of Louis XVI
- Elizabeth of Hungary (disambiguation), multiple princesses, particularly
  - Elisabeth of Hungary (1207–1231), saint and daughter of Andrew II of Hungary
- Elisabeth of Luxembourg (disambiguation), multiple princesses
- Elisabeth of Poland (disambiguation), multiple princesses
- Elizabeth of Russia (disambiguation), multiple princesses
- Elizabeth of Sweden (disambiguation), multiple princesses
- Princess Élisabeth Charlotte of Lorraine (1700–1711), daughter of Duke of Lorraine
- Princess Elisabeth of Savoy-Carignan (1800–1856), granddaughter of Vittorio Emanuele II
- Elizabeth Kekaaniau (1834–1928), daughter of Gideon Peleioholani Laanui, Hawaiian chief
- Elizabeth Ka'akaualaninui Wilcox (1860–1944), great-granddaughter of Gideon Peleioholani Laanui, Hawaiian chief
- Elizabeth Bagration (1880–1915), member of Georgian House of Mukhrani and daughter of Prince Alexander Mikheilis dze Bagration
- Elisabeth of Romania (1894–1956), wife of future George II of Greece
- Princess Elizabeth of Greece and Denmark (1904–1955), middle daughter of Prince Nicholas of Greece and Elena Vladimirovna; wife of Karl Feodor of Torreing-Jettenbach
- Princess Elizabeth of Toro (born 1936), Batebe of Toro, Ugandan politician, diplomat, lawyer, model, and actress, former Minister for Foreign Affairs and aunt of current king
- Princess Elizabeth of Yugoslavia (born 1936), member of the Serbian-Yugoslavian Karageorgevich dynasty, human rights activist and former candidate for President of Serbia
- Princess Elisabeth, Duchess of Brabant (born 2001), daughter and heir apparent of Philippe, King of the Belgians

== Other uses ==
- LMS Princess Royal Class 6201 Princess Elizabeth, preserved railway engine
- Princess Elizabeth Alps, a mountain range in Greenland
- Princess Elizabeth Avenue, Edmonton, Canada
- Princess Elisabeth Antarctica, a Belgian research station on Antarctica
- Princess Elizabeth Challenge Cup, a rowing event
- Princess Elizabeth Land, a sector of Antarctica
- Princess Elizabeth Primary School, a primary school in Bukit Batok New Town, Singapore
- Princess Elizabeth Stakes, a horse race in Epsom, England
- Princess Elizabeth Stakes (Canada), a horse race in Toronto, Ontario
- PS Princess Elizabeth, a paddlesteamer launched in 1926 that was one of the Little Ships of Dunkirk

== See also ==
- Elisabeth of Austria (disambiguation), lists archduchesses (a separate royal title) named Elisabeth
- Empress Elisabeth (disambiguation)
- Isabella of Portugal (disambiguation)
- Princess Isabella (disambiguation)
- Queen Elizabeth (disambiguation)
- Elizabeth (disambiguation)
  - Elizabeth (given name)
