= HMS Swallow (1781) =

Brig of the Royal Navy

History

Great Britain
- Builder: Robert Fabian, East Cowes
- Launched: 1781
- Acquired: 1781 by purchase
- Fate: Sold 1795

Great Britain
- Owner: Liverpool merchants Thomas Twemlow, Peter MacIver, Samuel McDowell, and Iver MacIver, and her captain John MacIver
- Acquired: 1796
- Fate: Last listed 1799

General characteristics
- Tons burthen: 254, or 256, or 26215/94 (bm)
- Length: Overall:80 ft 0 in (24.4 m); Keel:580 ft 7 1/4 in (177.0 m)
- Beam: 29 ft 0 in (8.8 m)
- Depth of hold: 10 ft 5 in (3.2 m)
- Sail plan: Brig
- Complement: HMS: 90; West Indiaman: 35; Hired armed vessel:80
- Armament: HMS: 16 × 4-pounder guns; West Indiaman: 14 × 6&9-pounder guns; Hired armed vessel:20 × 6&12-pounder cannons + coehorns + swivel guns

In 1781 the British Royal Navy purchased HMS Swallow on the stocks. The Navy sold her in 1795. She became a West Indiaman and a hired armed vessel for the British government. She captured some prizes and was last listed in Lloyd's Register (LR) in 1799.

== Career ==
Swallow was a clincher-built cutter that was re-rigged as a brig. The Navy gave her the establishment of a sloop.

Commander Michael de Courcy commissioned Swallow in October 1782. Commander David MacKay replaced de Courcy in October 1783. Commander William Smith took command in February 1787. In January 1790 Commander William Hargood replaced Smith. In January 1791 her commander was Commander James Bisset. Swallow was paid off in October.

Disposal: The Navy sold Swallow in 1795.

== Merchantman and hired armed vessel ==
Swallow first appeared in LR in 1797; It showed her origins as a "King's Yard" (i.e., a navy yard), in 1782. Her master was M'Iver, her owner M'Dowall, and her trade London–Martinique.

Captain John McIver acquired a letter of marque on 28 June 1796. In January 1797 MacGiver acquired a letter of marque against Spain. In December 1796 he had received a letter that shows that the government had hired Swallow and that MacIver was to sail her to Santo Domingo and there put her under the orders of Captain Richard Lane of the 44-gun frigate HMS Acasta.

While cruising off Léogâne to intercept supplies destined for the French, MacIver captured a large brig and schooner that were carrying supplies from the United States. Swallow also captured a number of other prizes. Lastly, she prevented the capture of Fame, of Liverpool, which had gotten separated from the homeward-bound convoy.

Swallow was last listed in 1799 with unchanged information. She was last listed in the Register of Shipping in 1801 but with stale data and no trade.
