= Elizabeth of Scotland =

Elizabeth of Scotland may refer to:

- Elizabeth de Burgh (c. 1289 – 1327), queen consort of Robert the Bruce, King of Scots
- Elizabeth Stewart, Countess of Crawford, 14th-century Scottish princess and seventh legitimate daughter of Robert II, King of Scots
- Elizabeth Stuart, Queen of Bohemia (1596–1662), Scottish princess and eldest daughter of James VI, King of Scots
- Elizabeth Stuart (daughter of Charles I) (1635–1650)
- Elizabeth, Queen of the United Kingdom (1926–2022; r. 1952–2022), whose primary realm included Scotland

== See also ==
- Elizabeth of Great Britain (disambiguation), lists princesses named Elizabeth of successor states of Kingdom of Scotland
- Princess Elizabeth (disambiguation)
