= Isabella of Castile (disambiguation) =

Isabella of Castile most often refers to Queen Isabella I (1451–1504).

Isabella of Castile may also refer to:

- Isabel (d. bef. 1107), fourth wife of Alfonso VI of León and Castile, perhaps identical to Alfonso's mistress, Zaida of Seville
- Isabel, born Zaida of Seville, mistress of Alfonso VI of León and Castile, of Iberian Muslim origin, perhaps identical to Alfonso's Queen Isabel
- Infanta Isabella of Castile, (d. aft. 1272), ninth child of Alfonso X of Castile
- Isabella of Castile, Queen of Aragon (1283–1328), daughter of Sancho IV of Castile and wife of James II of Aragon and John III, Duke of Brittany
- Infanta Isabella Núñez de Lara (1340–1361), Lady of Lara and Vizcaya; daughter of Juan Núñez de Lara, wife of Infante Juan of Aragon (1331–1358)
- Infanta Isabella of Castile, Duchess of York (1355–1392), daughter of Peter of Castile and wife of Edmund of Langley, 1st Duke of York
- Isabella of Portugal, Queen of Castile (1428–1496), wife of John II of Castile and mother of Isabella I
- Isabella I of Castile (1451–1504), Queen Regnant of Castile, wife of Ferdinand II of Aragon
- Isabella, Princess of Asturias (1470–1498), daughter of Isabella I of Castile and wife of Manuel I of Portugal
- Isabella of Austria, Isabella of Castile, Queen of Denmark, Norway and Sweden, daughter of Philip I of Castile and wife of Christian II of Denmark, Norway and Sweden
- Isabella II of Spain (1830–1904), queen of Spain, Castile, Leon, and Aragon

== Other ==
- Isabella of Castille, a song from the album Starfucker (album)

== See also ==
- Isabella of Spain (disambiguation)
- Isabella, Princess of Asturias (disambiguation)
