= Philippe Derome =

French figurative painter

Selma marche, oil on canvas, by Philippe Derome 1965

Philippe Derome (born 18 February 1937 in Paris) is a French figurative painter.

== Biography ==
Philippe Derome grew up in Boulogne-Billancourt and in Villeurbanne. In 1956 he settled in Paris where he studied with Paul Colin. From 1960 to 1970 he was privileged enough to be part of the sophisticated and artistic circles of Paris. In Paris, he met black American students and writers such as James Baldwin. Baldwin fed his interest on issues related to black American identity and the Civil rights movement. Later in the 1980s he also painted themes about the black people in France. The staggered representation of recreation is another dominant theme seen in Derome's work.

== Themes ==
His main subjects are :

Le Flore, oil on canvas, 1974

- The leisure civilisation : Ski, beaches scenes, nights clubs
- Négritude, Civil Rights Movement, Selma to Montgomery marches and later black people in France.
- Vanitas
- War

== Techniques ==
- Oils and acrylics on canvas, gouaches on paper.
- Objects and painted furnitures.
- Collages : books of photograpics assemblies or colors papers silhouette cut and stuck as artwork

== Artworks ==
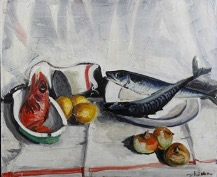
- Still Life of Mackerel and Red Mullet, oil on masonite board, by Phillippe Derome 1954
  Still Life with Mackerel and Red Mullet (1954)
- Riot (1963)
- Selma marche (1968)
- Black head (1971)
- Le Flore (1973)
- Jusqu'à quand ? (1974)
- Skieurs (1976)
- Harmony (1987)
- Tank rouge (1994)
- AIDS, hotel Bailey, NY (1997)

== Shows ==
- 1959 : Galerie Luc Burnap. Saint-Tropez. France
- 1960 : Luc Burnap Gallery. New York. USA
- 1967 : Biennale du Grand Palais, Paris (« Ph. Derome peint une conversation au Flore à la manière de Jean-Luc Godart », J. Warnod, le Figaro
- 1968 : Salon de Mai «A very hard-working young painter who knows what he wants and worries very little about –isms and the théories and ideas of others. » Edouard Roditi, NY Diplomat
- 1973 - 1980 : Galerie Annick Gendron Paris
- 1974 : Collection Jean Pierre Brasseur-Gregor. Munich (with a documentary realized by Fassbinder)
- 1978 : Marbella Club. Marbella
