= Elizabeth II (disambiguation) =

Elizabeth II (1926–2022; r. 1952–2022) was Queen of the United Kingdom.

Elizabeth II, Elizabeth 2 or Elisabeth II may also refer to:

- Elisabeth II, Abbess of Quedlinburg (1542–1584; r. 1574–1584), Princess-Abbess of Quedlinburg
- Queen Elizabeth 2, an ocean liner
- Queen Elizabeth II Centre, City of Westminster, London, England, United Kingdom

== See also ==
- Portrait of Elizabeth II (disambiguation)
- Elizabeth I (disambiguation)
- Elizabeth of Great Britain (disambiguation)
- Isabel II (disambiguation), the Spanish equivalent of Elizabeth II
- List of things named after Elizabeth II
- QE2 (disambiguation)
- Queen Elizabeth (disambiguation)
- The Queen (disambiguation)
