= Princess Elisabeth of Thurn and Taxis =

Princess Elisabeth of Thurn and Taxis may refer to:

- Princess Elisabeth of Thurn and Taxis (1860–1881), daughter of Maximilian Anton Lamoral, Hereditary Prince of Thurn and Taxis, wife of Miguel, Duke of Braganza
- Princess Elisabeth of Thurn and Taxis (1901–1950), daughter of William IV, Grand Duke of Luxembourg, wife of Prince Ludwig Philipp of Thurn and Taxis
- Princess Elisabeth Helene of Thurn and Taxis (1903–1976), daughter of Albert, 8th Prince of Thurn and Taxis, wife of Friedrich Christian, Margrave of Meissen
- Elisabeth von Thurn und Taxis (b. 1982), daughter of Johannes 11th, Prince of Thurn und Taxis and Gloria von Schönburg-Glauchau

== See also ==
- Princess Elizabeth (disambiguation)
