= Elisabeth of Luxembourg (disambiguation) =

Elisabeth of Luxembourg (1409–1442) was queen consort of Germany, Hungary and Bohemia.

Elisabeth (or Elizabeth) of Luxembourg may also refer to:

- Isabelle of Luxembourg (1247–1298), second wife of Guy of Dampierre, daughter of Count Henry V
- Elizabeth of Bohemia (1292–1330), wife of John the Blind (John of Luxembourg), mother of Charles IV
- Elisabeth of Bohemia (1358–1373), first wife of Albert III, Duke of Austria, daughter of Charles IV, Holy Roman Emperor
- Elisabeth of Pomerania (1347–1393), 4th wife of Charles IV, mother of Sigismund
- Elisabeth, Duchess of Luxembourg (1390–1451), reigning duchess of Luxembourg, also known as Elisabeth of Görlitz
- Princess Elisabeth of Luxembourg (1901–1950), daughter of Grand Duke Wilhelm IV, wife of Prince Ludwig Philipp of Thurn and Taxis
- Princess Elisabeth of Luxembourg (1922–2011), daughter of Grand Duchess Charlotte, wife of Franz, Duke of Hohenberg

== See also ==
- Elisabeth of Bohemia (disambiguation)
- Princess Elizabeth (disambiguation)
