= Elisabeth of Poland (disambiguation) =

Elisabeth of Poland or Elizabeth of Poland may refer to:

- Elisabeth of Greater Poland (1152–1209), married firstly ca. 1173 to Sobeslav II, Duke of Bohemia and secondly aft. January 1180 to Conrad of Landsberg, Margrave of Niederlausitz
- Elisabeth of Greater Poland (1263–1304), married Henry V, Duke of Legnica
- Elisabeth Richeza of Poland (1286–1335) married Wenceslaus II of Bohemia
- Elisabeth of Poland (1305–1380) married Charles I of Hungary
- Elisabeth of Poland (1326–1361) married Bogislaw V, Duke of Pomerania
- Elizabeth of Kuyavia married Stephen II, Ban of Bosnia, mother of Elizabeth of Bosnia

== See also ==
- Princess Elizabeth (disambiguation)
