= James Bisset (Royal Navy officer) =

Scottish Navy commander

Rear-Admiral James Bisset (1760–1824) was a Scottish commander in the Royal Navy during the Napoleonic Wars.

== Life ==
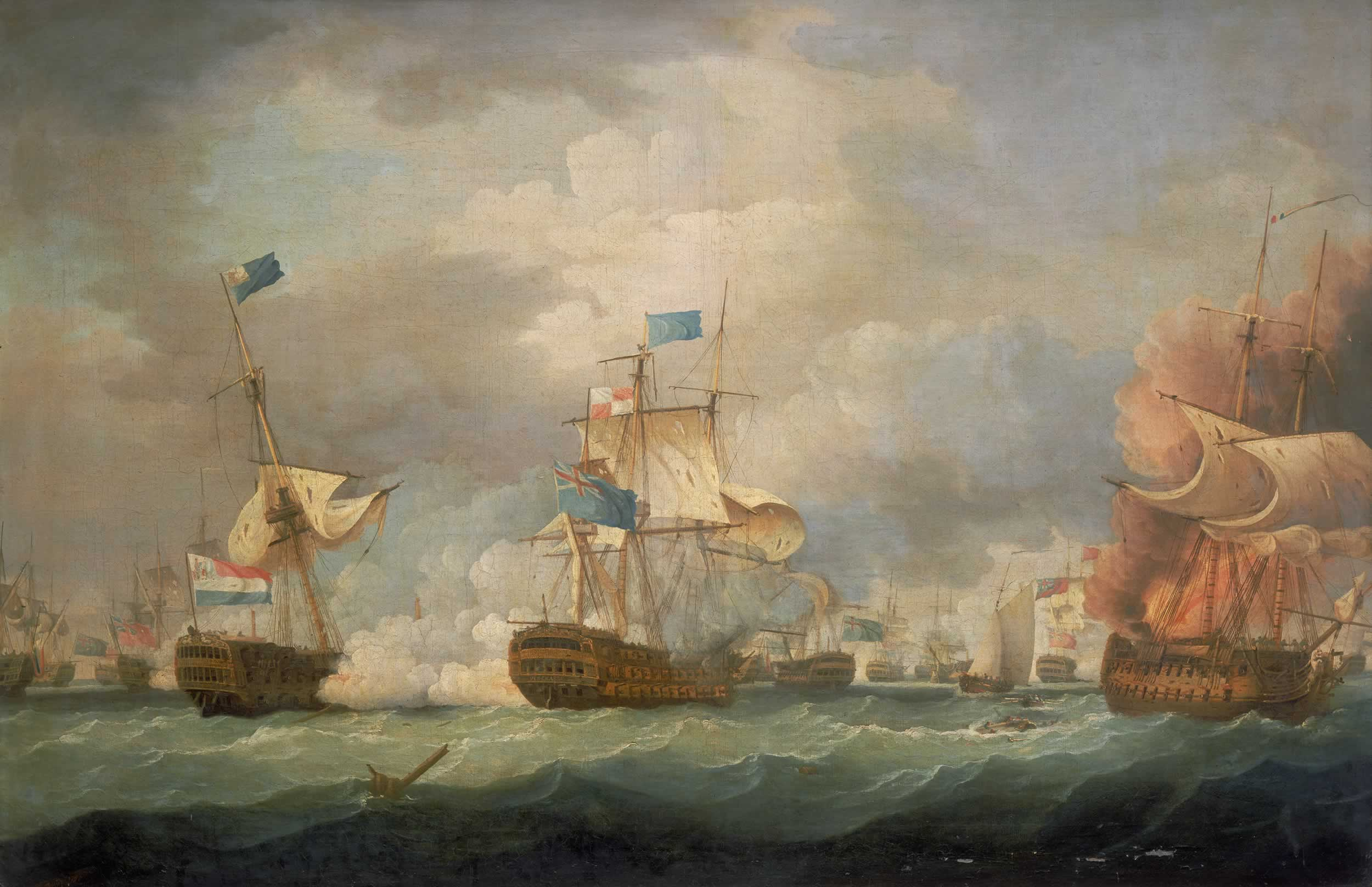
HMS Venerable (centre)

He was born in 1760 the third son of Captain Thomas Bisset (1722–1763), and his wife Janet McArthur. Bisset was a friend and ally of Captain Cook. When James' father died in 1763 when James was only three it is thought that he went to live with cousins in Edinburgh.

James joined the Royal Navy in 1771 as a captain's servant to Cpt John Bentinck on HMS Centaur a guardship at Portsmouth. In October 1773 he was present when Bentinck entertained Benjamin Franklin on board and he famously demonstrated the calming of the water by pouring oil on it.

He joined the sloop HMS Wasp in 1775 and stayed with this ship until commissioned as a Lieutenant on 10 February 1778, then joining HMS Elizabeth under Cpt Frederick Maitland. In 1767 Maitland had married Bisset's first cousin, Margaret Louisa Dick of Edinburgh.

In 1791 he was commanding the 16-gun HMS Swallow moving to 14-gun HMS Falcon, based in Jamaica, the following year. In 1793 he saw action in the English Channel, capturing several privateers, and was promoted to Post Captain in October 1794.

In 1795 he was given the far larger HMS Venerable, a 74-gun ship of the line, under Admiral Duncan in the North Sea.

On 23 December 1805 he sat on the panel of judges at Admiral Robert Calder's court-martial.

In 1811 his wife lived at Carnegie Street in south Edinburgh and in 1813 moved nearby to 174 Pleasance.

In December 1813 he was promoted to rear admiral.

His ultimate command was the highly prestigious 100-gun HMS Sovereign, which had famously seen action at the Battle of Trafalgar.

He died in Edinburgh on 20 January 1824 and is buried in New Calton Burial Ground in Edinburgh. He did not have any children.
