= QE3 =

QE3 may refer to:

- (5346) 1981 QE_{3}, a minor planet
- Qe3, the algebraic chess notation for moving a queen to square e3
- QE3, the boat that Don Allum used to row across the Atlantic Ocean in 1971
- QE3, a third round of quantitative easing

== See also ==
- MS Queen Elizabeth, the third Cunard Line ocean liner of that name
- QE (disambiguation)
- QE1 (disambiguation)
- QE2 (disambiguation)
