= Elizabeth of Denmark =

Elizabeth of Denmark or Elisabeth of Denmark may refer to:

- Isabella of Austria (1501–1526), wife of Christian II of Denmark
- Elizabeth of Denmark, Electress of Brandenburg (1485–1555), daughter of John of Denmark and wife of Joachim I Nestor, Elector of Brandenburg
- Elizabeth of Denmark, Duchess of Mecklenburg (1524–1586), daughter of Frederick I of Denmark and wife of Magnus III, Duke of Mecklenburg-Schwerin and later Ulrich, Duke of Mecklenburg
- Elizabeth of Denmark, Duchess of Brunswick-Wolfenbüttel (1573–1626), daughter of Frederick II of Denmark and wife of Henry Julius, Duke of Brunswick-Wolfenbüttel
- Princess Elisabeth of Denmark (1935–2018), daughter of Knud, Hereditary Prince of Denmark
- Princess Isabella of Denmark (b. 2007), daughter of King Frederik X of Denmark

== See also ==
- Princess Elizabeth (disambiguation)
