= Elisabeth of Hesse (disambiguation) =

Elisabeth of Hesse (1539–1582) was the fourth daughter of Philip I, Landgrave of Hesse, and the first spouse of Louis VI, Elector Palatine.

Elisabeth of Hesse may also refer to:

- Elisabeth of Hesse-Marburg (1466–1523), eldest daughter of Henry III, Landgrave of Upper Hesse
- Elisabeth of Hesse, Hereditary Princess of Saxony (1502–1557), eldest daughter of William II, Landgrave of Hesse
- Elisabeth of Hesse, Countess Palatine of Zweibrücken (1503–1563), youngest daughter of William I, Landgrave of Lower Hesse
- Princess Elisabeth of Hesse and by Rhine (disambiguation), various princesses, including
  - Princess Elisabeth of Hesse (1864–1918), second daughter of Louis IV, Grand Duke of Hesse

== See also ==
- Landgravine Elisabeth Amalie of Hesse-Darmstadt (1635–1709), third daughter of George II, Landgrave of Hesse-Darmstadt, and second spouse of Philip William, Elector Palatine
- Elisabeth Henriette of Hesse-Kassel (1661–1683), youngest child of William VI, Landgrave of Hesse-Kassel, and first spouse of Frederick I, King in Prussia
- Princess Elizabeth (disambiguation)
