= Elizabeth of Russia (disambiguation) =

Elizabeth of Russia (1709–1762) was the ruler of Russia from 1741 until her death in 1762.

Elizabeth of Russia may also refer to:

- Elisiv of Kiev (1025–1067), daughter of Yaroslav I the Wise
- Elizabeth Alexeievna (Louise of Baden) (1779–1826), wife of Alexander I of Russia
- Grand Duchess Elizabeth Alexandrovna of Russia (1806 – 1808), daughter of Alexander I of Russia
- Grand Duchess Elizabeth Mikhailovna of Russia (1826–1845), daughter of Grand Duke Michael Pavlovich of Russia
- Princess Elisabeth of Saxe-Altenburg (1865–1927), daughter of Prince Moritz of Saxe-Altenburg; wife of Grand Duke Constantine Constantinovich of Russia as Grand Duchess Elizabeth Mavrikievna of Russia
- Princess Elisabeth of Hesse and by Rhine (1864–1918), daughter of Louis IV, Grand Duke of Hesse; wife of Grand Duke Sergei Alexandrovich of Russia of Russia as Grand Duchess Elizabeth Feodorovna of Russia

== See also ==
- Princess Elizabeth (disambiguation)
