= Elizabeth Stakes =

Elizabeth Stakes may refer to:

- Princess Elizabeth Stakes, horse race in UK
- Princess Elizabeth Stakes (Canada), horse race in Canada
- Queen Elizabeth Stakes (VRC), horse race in Melbourne, Victoria, Australia
- Queen Elizabeth Stakes (ATC), horse race in Sydney, New South Wales, Australia
- King George VI and Queen Elizabeth Stakes, horse race in UK
- Queen Elizabeth II Stakes, horse race in UK
- Queen Elizabeth II Challenge Cup Stakes, horse race in USA

== See also ==
- Elizabeth (disambiguation)
- Elizabeth Cup (disambiguation)
- Queen's Cup (disambiguation)
