= Princess Isabelle =

Princess Isabelle may refer to:

- Saint Isabelle of France (1225 – 1270), a French princess and daughter of Louis VIII of France and Blanche of Castile
- Princess Isabelle of Orléans-Braganza (1911–2003), Countess of Paris
- Princess Isabelle of Orléans (1878–1961) (1878–1961), a member of the French Orleanist royal family
- Princess Isabelle of Orléans (1900–1983) (1900–1983)
- Princess Isabelle of Liechtenstein, a member of the Family of Liechtenstein

== See also ==
- Princess Marie Isabelle of Liechtenstein (born 1959), wife of Prince Gundakar of Liechtenstein
- Princess Isabella (disambiguation)
- Queen Isabella (disambiguation)
