= Elisabeth of Bohemia =

Elisabeth (or Elizabeth) of Bohemia may refer to:

- Elisabeth Richeza of Poland (1286–1335), daughter of Przemysl II of Poland and wife of Wenceslaus II of Bohemia.
- Elisabeth of Bohemia (1292–1330), daughter of Wenceslaus II of Bohemia and wife of John of Luxemburg, King of Bohemia.
- Elisabeth of Bohemia (1358–1373), daughter of Charles IV of Luxemburg, Holy Roman Emperor and King of Bohemia.
- Elisabeth of Pomerania (1347–1393), wife of Charles IV of Luxemburg, Holy Roman Emperor and King of Bohemia.
- Elisabeth, Duchess of Luxembourg (1390–1451), granddaughter of Charles IV of Luxemburg.
- Elisabeth of Luxembourg, Queen of Bohemia (1409–1442), queen consort of Hungary
- Elisabeth of Austria (1436–1505), daughter of Albert II, Holy Roman Emperor, King of Bohemia and Hungary, and Elisabeth of Bohemia, wife of Casimir IV of Poland.
- Elizabeth Stuart (1596–1662), daughter of James VI/I of Scotland and England, wife of Frederick V, Elector Palatine and King of Bohemia.
- Elisabeth of the Palatinate (also called "Elizabeth of Bohemia") (1618–1680), daughter of Frederick V, Elector Palatine, and Elizabeth Stuart, philosopher and correspondent of Descartes.

== See also ==
- Elisabeth of Luxembourg (disambiguation)
- Princess Elizabeth (disambiguation)
