= Isabella of France (disambiguation) =

Isabella of France (c. 1295 – 1358) was the only surviving daughter of King Philip IV and the queen consort of Edward II of England.

Isabella of France or Isabelle of France may also refer to:

- Saint Isabelle of France (1225–1270), youngest daughter of King Louis VIII
- Isabella of France, Queen of Navarre (1241–1271), second daughter of King Louis IX and consort of Theobald II of Navarre
- Isabella of Aragon, Queen of France (c. 1247 – 1271), first queen consort of King Philip III
- Isabella of France, Dauphine of Viennois (1312–1348), third child of King Philip V
- Isabella of Valois, Duchess of Bourbon (1313–1383), granddaughter of King Philip III
- Isabella, Countess of Vertus (1348–1372), youngest child of King John II
- Isabella of Valois (1389–1409), second daughter of King Charles VI and second queen consort of Richard II of England

== See also ==
- Elizabeth of France (disambiguation)
