= Beautiful Portrait, The Queen =

2014 painting by Damien Hirst

- Artist: Damien Hirst
- Year: 2014
- Type: Spin painting
- Subject: Queen Elizabeth II
- Owner: Government Art Collection

Beautiful Portrait, The Queen is a 2014 painting by Damien Hirst. The tondo is one of few portraits by Hirst, and depicts Queen Elizabeth II. It was made for the Government Art Collection, the official art collection of the British government.

The spin painting was made using household gloss paint, on a circular canvas with a diameter of 152.4 cm (60.0 in). It has radial bands of pink and light blue on a white ground, overpainted with a portrait of the Queen in darker red and blue, reproducing a photograph. She is depicted in a three quarter view, slightly smiling, wearing the Girls of Great Britain and Ireland Tiara, familiar from the Arnold Machin series of British coins issued until 1984. The modernist, almost Pop Art, image is also reminiscent of Jamie Reid's cover of the Sex Pistols second single "God Save the Queen", released in 1977.

Hirst made the painting after he was approached by the Government Art Collection, which was seeking a second Hirst painting to add to the single example already in its collection: the 2004 spot painting Pardaxin, acquired from White Cube in 2005 (the collection also holds two Hirst screenprints: an untitled work acquired in 1997, and Tulip Varieties acquired in 2018). As Hirst supports the collection's aims but his expensive paintings were beyond the official budget (similar works have sold for millions of pounds) he made a new spin painting specifically for the collection which was presented to the British government in 2015 by the artist's charity, Victim. Some art critics have decried this as Hirst joining "the establishment" or "selling out".

It is signed, dated and titled on the front of the canvas: "Damien Hirst", "Beautiful / portrait / 'The Queen' " and "2014", and the back is also signed "D Hirst" on the stretcher bar. As of 2021, the work has never been exhibited in public. It was displayed in the office of Matt Hancock at the Department for Culture, Media and Sport, and moved to his new office at the Department of Health and Social Care after Hancock became Secretary of State in July 2018. It has appeared behind Hancock in photographs and television interviews from his government office during the COVID-19 pandemic in 2020–21.

Other portraits by Hirst include a similar spin painting of Lionel Messi, entitled Beautiful Messi Spin Painting For One In Eleven, which was auctioned at Sotheby's in 2015 for £365,000 to raise funds for UNICEF's "1 in 11" campaign to support primary education, and a portrait of George Michael, entitled Beautiful Beautiful George Michael Love Painting, sold at a charity auction in 2017 for $580,000 to raise funds for the Goss-Michael Foundation.
