= Princess Elisabeth of Hesse and by Rhine (disambiguation) =

Princess Elisabeth of Hesse and by Rhine (1864–1918) was the second daughter of Louis IV, Grand Duke of Hesse.

Princess Elisabeth of Hesse and by Rhine may also refer to:

- Princess Elisabeth of Hesse and by Rhine (1821–1826), eldest daughter of Louis II, Grand Duke of Hesse
- Princess Elisabeth of Hesse and by Rhine (1895–1903), only daughter of Ernest Louis, Grand Duke of Hesse

== See also ==
- Elisabeth of Hesse (disambiguation)
- Princess Elizabeth (disambiguation)
