= Elizebeth =

Elizebeth is a given name. Notable people with the name include:

- Elizebeth Smith Friedman (1892–1980), American cryptanalyst and author
- Elizebeth Thomas Werlein (1883–1946), American preservationist

== See also ==
- Elizabeth (disambiguation)
- Sydney Agudong (born 2000), American actress and singer, sometimes credited as "Sydney Elizebeth Agudong"
