= QE2 (disambiguation) =

QE2 (Queen Elizabeth 2) is a retired ocean liner.

QE2 may also refer to:

== Astronomy ==
- (10457) 1978 QE_{2}, a main-belt minor planet
- (7168) 1986 QE_{2}, a main-belt minor planet
- (10083) 1990 QE_{2}, a main-belt minor planet
- (7827) 1992 QE_{2}, a main-belt minor planet
- (10862) 1995 QE_{2}, a main-belt minor planet
- (14534) 1997 QE_{2}, a main-belt minor planet
- (285263) 1998 QE_{2}, a near-Earth asteroid

== Other uses ==
- Elizabeth II (1926–2022; r. 1952–2022), Queen of the United Kingdom
- QE2 (album), by Mike Oldfield, 1980
- Qe2, the algebraic chess notation for moving a queen to square e2
- QE2 (monetary policy), a second round of quantitative easing

== See also ==
- Alberta Highway 2, known as the Queen Elizabeth II Highway between Calgary and Edmonton
- Elizabeth II (disambiguation)
- List of things named after Elizabeth II
- QE (disambiguation)
- QE1 (disambiguation)
- QE3 (disambiguation)
