= Eugène de Kermadec =

French painter

Eugène de Kermadec (1899 Paris – 1976) was a French painter.

En ordre dispersé, E de Kermadec, oils on canvas, 1962

Mr R Loubet, Mr and Mrs de Kermadec, Annick Gendron at an inauguration, Gallery Gendron, 1973

== Biography ==
Eugène de Kermadec studied at the École des Arts Decoratifs in 1915 and later at the École des Beaux Arts. During this time Paris was the center of the avant-garde, and the painterly language was Cubism. Kermadec, along with several foreign and French artists came into Cubism after 1918 when more and more artists adopting this technique and that the almost scientific approach was relaxed and replaced by a more lyrical style and figurative style. His first show was in 1929. From early on the Galerie Louise Leiris, which gallery was the centre of the avant-garde and the Cubists.

== Notes and references ==
- Exhibition Galerie Louise Leiris, Paris, 1929
- Exhibition Gallerie Annick Gendron, Paris, 1973
- Catalog exhibition : E. de Kermadec 1899 -1976. Dernières oeuvres Paris, Galerie Louise Leiris, 1977
