= Princess Elisabeth of Saxe-Altenburg =

Princess Elisabeth of Saxe-Altenburg may refer to:

- Princess Elisabeth Sophie of Saxe-Altenburg (1619–1680), daughter of Johann Philipp, Duke of Saxe-Altenburg
- Princess Elisabeth of Saxe-Altenburg (1826–1896), daughter of Joseph, Duke of Saxe-Altenburg
- Princess Elisabeth of Saxe-Altenburg (1865–1927), daughter of Prince Moritz of Saxe-Altenburg
- Princess Elisabeth Karola (1903–1991), daughter of Ernst II, Duke of Saxe-Altenburg

== See also ==
- Princess Elizabeth (disambiguation)
