= Elisabeth of Austria =

Elisabeth of Austria may refer to:

== People ==
- Elisabeth of Austria (died 1107), daughter of Leopold II, Margrave of Austria
- Elisabeth of Austria (1124–1143), daughter of Leopold III, Margrave of Austria; wife of Hermann II of Winzenburg
- Elisabeth of Austria, Duchess of Lorraine (c. 1285–1353), daughter of Albert I of Germany, Duke of Austria; wife of Frederick IV, Duke of Lorraine
- Elizabeth of Austria (1436–1505), daughter of Albert II of Germany; Queen consort of Casimir IV of Poland and Lithuania
- Isabella of Austria (1501–1526), Queen of Denmark, Norway and Sweden; widely known also as Elizabeth
- Elizabeth of Austria (1526–1545), daughter of Ferdinand I, Holy Roman Emperor; Queen consort of Sigismund II Augustus of Poland
- Elisabeth of Austria, Queen of France (1554–1592), daughter of Maximilian II, Holy Roman Emperor; Queen consort of Charles IX of France
- Archduchess Maria Elisabeth of Austria (governor) (1680–1741), governor of the Austrian Netherlands between 1725 and 1741
- Archduchess Maria Elisabeth of Austria (born 1737) (1737–1740), eldest child and daughter of Empress Maria Theresa and Francis I, Holy Roman Emperor
- Archduchess Maria Elisabeth of Austria (born 1743) (1743–1808), archduchess of Austria and princess of Tuscany
- Duchess Elisabeth of Württemberg (1767–1790), archduchess of Austria by her marriage to future Emperor Francis II
- Archduchess Elisabeth Franziska of Austria (1831–1903), daughter of Archduke Joseph, Palatine of Hungary; wife first of Archduke Ferdinand Karl Viktor of Austria-Este & second of Archduke Karl Ferdinand of Austria
- Empress Elisabeth of Austria (1837–1898), daughter of Duke Maximilian Joseph in Bavaria; wife of Emperor Franz Joseph I
- Archduchess Elisabeth Amalie of Austria (1878–1960), daughter of Archduke Charles Louis of Austria; wife of Prince Aloys of Liechtenstein
- Archduchess Elisabeth Marie of Austria (1883–1963), daughter of Rudolf, Crown Prince of Austria; wife first of Otto Weriand of Windisch-Grätz, second of Leopold Petznek
- Archduchess Elisabeth Franziska of Austria (1892–1930), daughter of Archduke Franz Salvator of Austria; wife of Georg Graf von Waldburg zu Zeil und Hohenems
- Archduchess Elisabeth of Austria (1922–1993), daughter of Emperor Charles I of Austria; wife of Prince Heinrich of Liechtenstein

== Other uses ==
- Elisabeth of Austria (film), a 1931 German film by Adolf Trotz starring Lil Dagover

== See also ==
- Princess Elizabeth (disambiguation)
