= QE1 =

QE1 may refer to:

- (5657) 1936 QE_{1}, a minor planet
- (5860) 1981 QE_{1}, a minor planet
- Elizabeth I (1533–1603; r. 1558–1603), Queen of England
- Qe1, the algebraic chess notation for moving a queen to square e1
- QE1, a first round of quantitative easing

== See also ==
- Elizabeth I (disambiguation)
- QE (disambiguation)
- QE2 (disambiguation)
- QE3 (disambiguation)
- RMS Queen Elizabeth, the first Cunard Line ocean liner of that name
