= Isabella of Spain =

Isabella of Spain or Isabel of Spain may refer to:

- Isabella I of Castile (1451–1504), queen regnant
- Isabella II of Spain (1830–1904), queen regnant
- Isabella of Austria (1501–1526), Spanish infanta, queen consort of Denmark-Norway
- Isabella Clara Eugenia (1566–1633), Spanish infanta, archduchess of the Spanish Netherlands
- María Isabella of Spain (1789–1848), Spanish infanta, queen consort of the Kingdom of the Two Sicilies
- Infanta Isabel, Countess of Girgenti, Princess of Asturias (1851-1931), Spanish infanta

== See also ==
- Isabella, Princess of Asturias (disambiguation)
- Isabella of Castile (disambiguation)
