= Elizabeth of Hungary (disambiguation) =

Elizabeth of Hungary most commonly refers to Saint Elizabeth, Landgravine of Thuringia (1207–1231), daughter of King Andrew II of Hungary.

Elizabeth of Hungary may also refer to:

- Elizabeth of Hungary, Duchess of Greater Poland (c. 1128–1154), daughter of King Béla II of Hungary
- Elizabeth of Hungary, Duchess of Bohemia (1145–1189)
- Elizabeth of Hungary, Duchess of Bavaria (1236–1271), daughter of King Béla IV of Hungary
- Elizabeth of Hungary, Queen of Serbia (c. 1255–1313), daughter of King Stephen V of Hungary
- Elizabeth of Töss (1292–1336 or 1338), Dominican nun, daughter of King Andrew III of Hungary
- Elizabeth of Slavonia (1352–before 1380), Princess of Taranto, granddaughter of King Charles I of Hungary
- Elizabeth of Austria (1436–1505), wife of King Casimir IV of Poland

== See also ==
- Elizabeth of Bosnia, queen consort of Hungary 1353–1382, queen regent 1382–1385, 1386
- Princess Elizabeth (disambiguation)
