= Alfons Schilling =

Swiss painter

Alfons J. Schilling
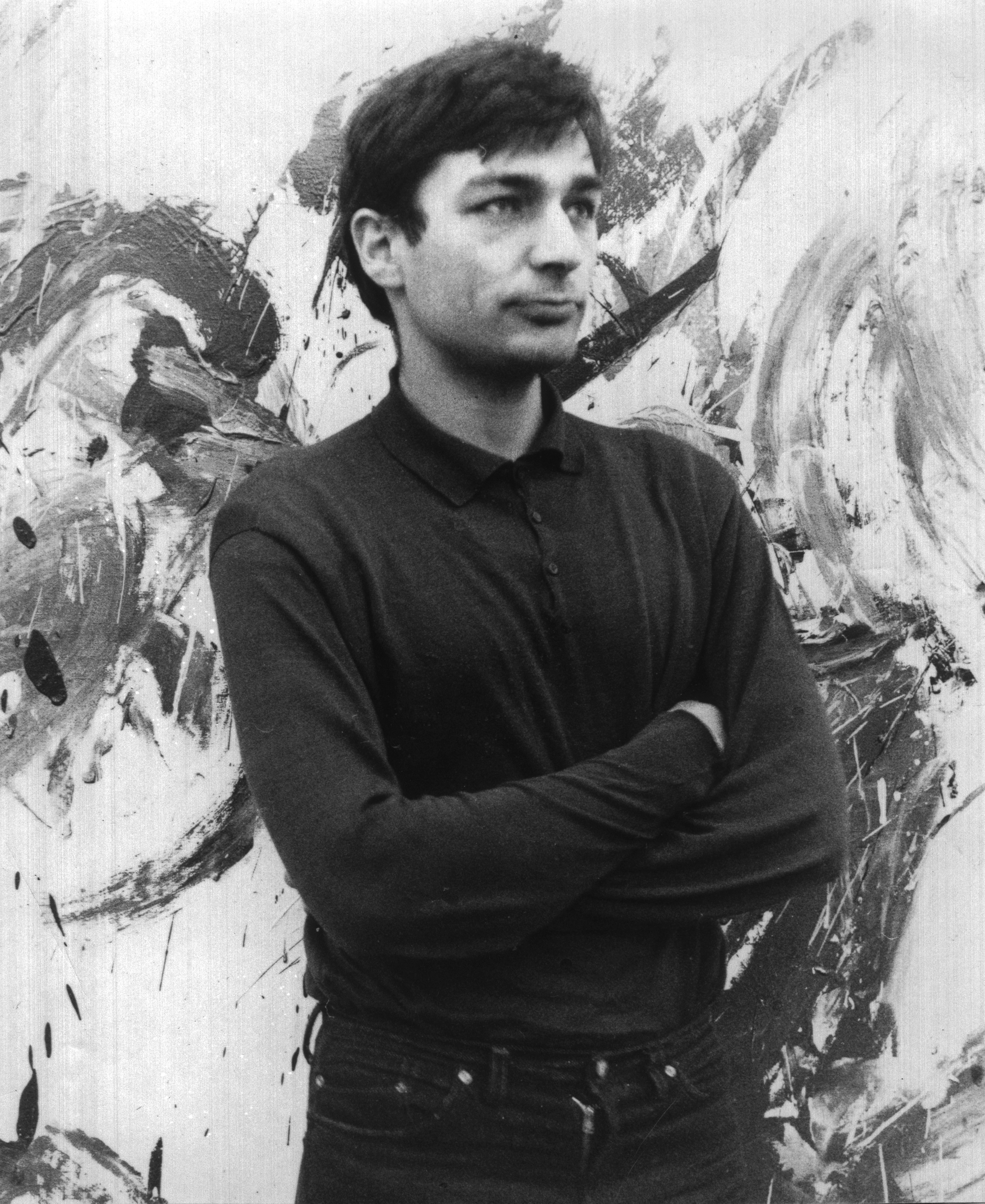
- Born: 20 May 1934; Basel, Switzerland
- Died: 19 June 2013 (aged 79); Vienna, Austria
- Known for: Painter, Photographer
- Movement: Spin art Action Painting; Viennese Actionism

Alfons J. Schilling (20 May 1934 – 19 June 2013) was a Swiss painter.

== Life ==
One of the first artists to become interested in spin art. He taught at various US universities and art schools. In 1986, he returned to Vienna and held a visiting professorship at the University of Applied Arts there until 1990. He also devoted himself to experiments with light and worked with composers such as Beat Furrer (light production for the opera Die Blinden, Vienna, 1989) and Karlheinz Essl (Music Protocol, Graz, 1990).

Action painting also had a large influence on his work and added to its originality. Alfons Schilling is apparently a learned follower of viennese actionism. He died in June 2013.

== Exhibitions ==
- Galerie Ariadne, 1975.

== Literature ==
- Schilling, Alfons; Weibel, Peter (2017). Ratz, Ines; Coeln, Peter; Reuter, Rebekka; Knierim, Fabian; Ratz, Inés (eds.). Alfons Schilling - Beyond Photography. Westlicht, Schauplatz für Fotografie. Wien: Verlag für Moderne Kunst. ISBN 978-3-903153-01-1.
- Schilling, Alfons; Essl, Karlheinz; Oberhollenzer, Günther (2009). Alfons Schilling. Museum Essl. Wien: Edition Sammlung Essl. ISBN 978-3-902001-49-8.
- Schilling, Alfons, ed. (2008). Die frühen Bilder. Wien: Schlebrügge. ISBN 978-3-85160-127-5.
