= Queen's Cup =

Queen's Cup may refer to:

- Queen's Cup (football), a former annual football competition in Thailand (1970-2010)
- Cartier Queen's Cup, an annual polo tournament in England
- Queen's Cup (golf), an annual golf tournament in Thailand
- Queen's Cup (ice hockey), an annual ice hockey championship in Canada
- Queen's Cup (horse race), an Australian horse race held in rotation in different states; called King's Cup from 1927 to 1951
  - SAJC Queen's Cup, name used in South Australia
- Queen's cup, a common name for a flowering plant native to western North America

== See also ==
- Elizabeth Stakes (disambiguation), for some races referred to informally as the Queen's Cup
- Queen of Cups, tarot card
- The Queens (golf), a women's professional team golf tournament held in Japan
