= Elisabeth (schooner) =

A number of schooners were named Elisabeth, including:

- Elisabeth (1919 schooner), a Danish schooner wrecked in 1920
- Elisabeth (1922 schooner), a German schooner that was sold in 1935
