= Mural of Elizabeth II =

2022 artwork

Coordinates: 51.47265675°N 0.35661403°W

- Subject: Elizabeth II
- Location: London, United Kingdom

In 2022, Jignesh and Yash Patel painted a mural of Elizabeth II, following her death. Located outside the Hounslow East Underground tube station, the mural took two days to complete and was funded in part by the Indian Diaspora in UK (IDUK) group via GoFundMe. The mural has received a mixed reaction.
