= Elizabeth (1809 Bristol ship) =

History

United Kingdom
- Name: Elizabeth
- Owner: 1809:Robert Claxton and Sons; 1814: (Note: "Richard Drew and J ames Drew, jr., mariners, Bristol; Anthony Hart, esquire, John Backhouse and Thomas Aston, jr., merchants, London; and Thomas Aston, esquire, Eyford House, Gloucestershire.")
- Builder: Hull built by William James, Brice, & Co., Wapping; Completed by Robert Claxton & Sons, Bristol
- Launched: 1809
- Fate: Wrecked 7 October 1819

General characteristics
- Type: Ship
- Tons burthen: 502, or 515, or 51577/94, or 516 (bm)
- Length: 120 ft 0 in (36.6 m)
- Beam: 31 ft 2 in (9.5 m)
- Propulsion: Sail
- Complement: 30
- Armament: 1809:14 × 9&6-pounder guns; 1816:4 × 6 + 12 × 9-pounder guns
- Notes: Two decks and three masts

Elizabeth was launched at Bristol in 1809. She was originally a West Indiaman, but she wrecked in October 1819 at Table Bay while sailing from Bombay to London.

== Career ==
William James, Brice and Co. built Elizabeth at Wapping, but on 3 June 1809, there appeared an advertisement for the sale, at auction, of their stock and trade, including the "hull of a new ship, copper fastened, about 500 tons," etc. Robert Claxton and Sons completed the vessel at Bristol, and she became Elizabeth.

James Drew, jnr. acquired a letter of marque on 28 August. Elizabeth appears in the 1810 volume of Lloyd's Register with J. Drew, master, Claxton, owner, and trade Bristol—St Vincent. She then continued to trade with the West Indies.

On 2 February 1812 Elizabeth, Drew, master, was on her way from London to St Vincent when she was driven ashore near Dungeness. A boat's crew from the shore came to her assistance and got her off. They left her safe about five miles off the coast. She had lost an anchor and cable, and was proceeding to Portsmouth. She subsequently underwent repairs for damages. From 1813 to 1814 her master was Power.

In September 1814, Claxton & Co. sold Elizabeth at auction to Aston and Company. From 1814 her master was Drew; in 1815 it was Richard Drew.

The Register of Shipping for 1816 shows her master as J. Drew, changing to Cooksley, and her trade as Bristol—St Vincent, changing to London—Ne(illegible). William Cooksley assumed command on 26 June 1815 at Basseterre.

In 1813, the British East India Company (EIC) had lost its monopoly on the trade between India and Britain. British ships were then free to sail to India or the Indian Ocean under a licence from the EIC.

On 12 September 1818, Thomas Harrison took command of Elizabeth in London. On 25 September 1818, her owners sold Elizabeth to the London merchant Edmund Reed. She was then registered in London on 13 October. Harrison sailed Elizabeth to Bombay.

The Register of Shipping for 1820, gives the name of Elizabeth's master as Harrison, that of her owner as E. Reed, and her trade as London—Bombay.

On 28 March 1819, Elizabeth, Harrison, master, sailed for Bombay under a licence from the EIC.

== Loss ==
On 7 October 1819, Elizabeth, Harrison, master, was on a voyage from Bombay to London and arrived at Table Bay. As she was turning she ran aground and was subsequently wrecked.
