= Murder of Lizbeth Medina =

2023 murder of a teenager in Texas

- Photograph of Lizbeth Medina, courtesy of her aunt Ana Medina
- Location: Edna, Texas, U.S.
- Date: December 5, 2023 (CST)
- Target: Lizbeth Medina
- Weapon: Knife
- Deaths: 1
- Victim: Lizbeth Iniguez Medina (aged 16)
- Perpetrator: Rafael Govea Romero
- Verdict: Guilty
- Convictions: Murder; aggravated robbery with a deadly weapon; burglary of a habitation

Lizbeth Iniguez Medina (March 28, 2007 – December 5, 2023) was a 16-year-old American girl from Edna, Texas who was stabbed multiple times to death in a bathtub. Jacqueline Medina discovered her daughter's body in their family apartment after Lizbeth failed to appear to perform with her school cheerleading squad at a Christmas parade. Perpetrator Rafael Govea Romero, an undocumented immigrant, was arrested and later pled guilty to the crime, prompting national attention to the case from critics of illegal immigration.

== Background ==
Lizbeth Iniguez Medina was born on March 28, 2007, in Grand Island, Nebraska. A year before Lizbeth's murder, her family moved to Edna, a small city approximately 25 miles northeast of Victoria, Texas. Lizbeth was a student and cheerleader at Edna High School. "She loved everybody. She cared for everybody," Jacqueline, Lizbeth's mother, told reporters at her school's football game days after the murder.

Rafael Govea Romero was a 23-year-old man from Mexico who had entered the United States on a work visa in 2018, but later he overstayed. In October 2022, he was charged with felony burglary in Schulenburg. In April 2023, less than eight months before Medina's murder, he entered a no-contest plea and was placed on five years of probation.

== Murder ==
On the evening of December 5, 2023, Jacqueline Medina grew concerned when her daughter failed to appear at a Christmas parade in Edna. Lizbeth was scheduled to perform with the Edna High School cheer squad. Returning to the family's apartment at the Cottonwood Apartments on North Wells Street, she found Lizbeth stabbed to death in the bathtub of the rear bedroom. Officers from the Edna Police Department responded at approximately 6:55 p.m. Medina died from stab wounds. A GoFundMe page established by Lizbeth's aunt Ana in Grand Island raised over $21,000 to cover funeral expenses and return her remains to Nebraska.

== Investigation ==
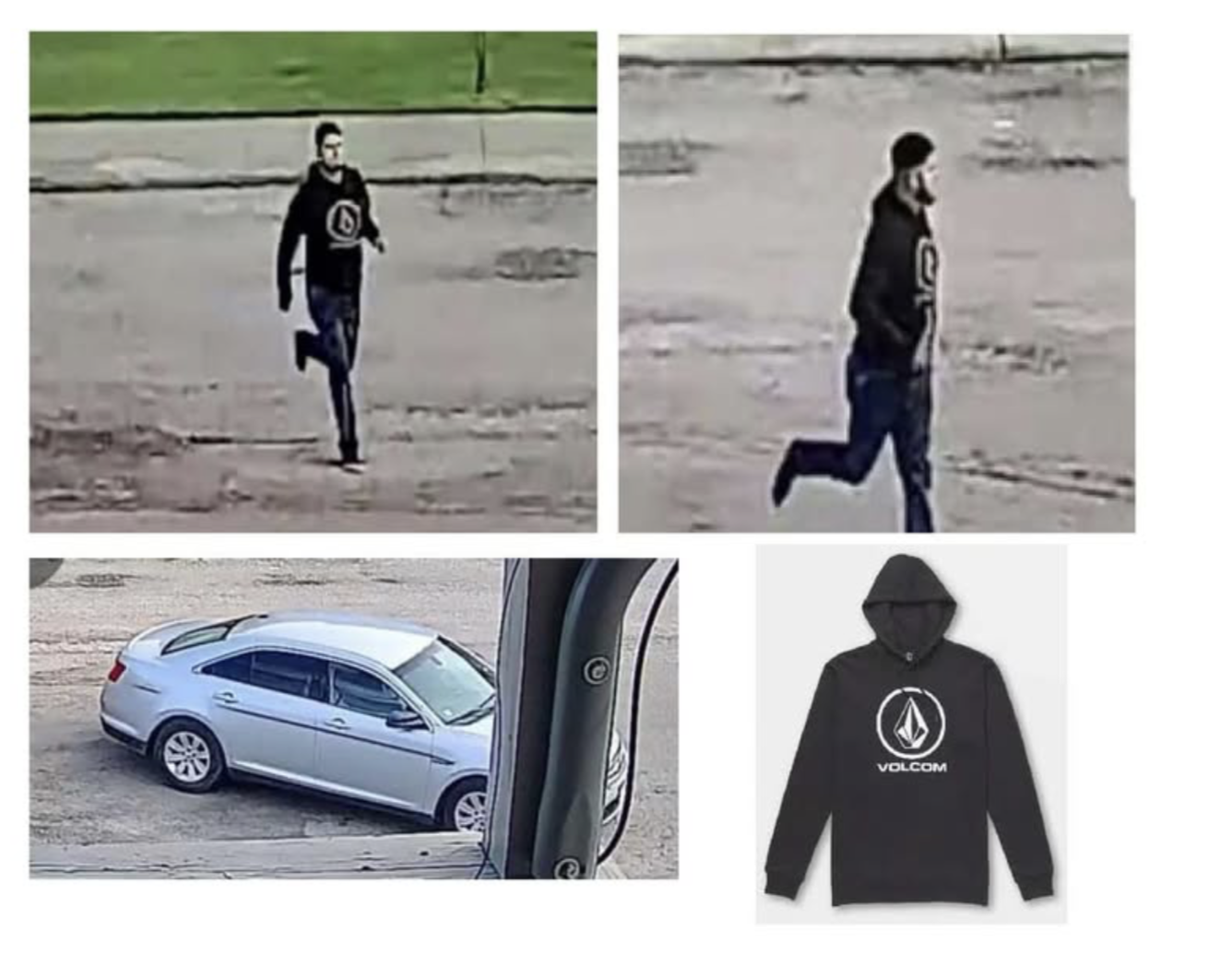
Images released by the Edna Police Department of a person of interest sought in the investigation of Lizbeth Medina's death on December 8, 2023.

Investigators from the Edna Police Department, the Texas Rangers, the Jackson County Sheriff's Office, and the Texas Department of Public Safety treated the case as a capital murder. Surveillance video from the night before the murder showed a silver Ford Taurus driving through the Cottonwood Apartments complex at approximately 10 p.m. The following morning, a man was captured on surveillance footage running toward his vehicle near the apartment building at around 10:15 a.m. A nearby resident reported hearing two loud sounds and then the sound of a shower running inside the Medina apartment at approximately 10:03 a.m.

On December 8, police released photographs of a male person of interest. He was described as possibly bearing a tattoo behind his right ear and wearing a black Volcom hooded sweatshirt, along with images of a silver Ford Taurus. Police identified Romero as a suspect and tracked him to Schulenburg through a tip on December 9. Officers located him at a private residence with family. Edna Police Chief Rick Boone said he was "100 percent confident" Romero had killed Medina, and that Romero had confessed to the crime.

Romero had exhibited stalking-like behavior toward Medina the weeks before her death. Officials determined that he was responsible for a burglary at the same apartment on November 13, 2023, approximately three weeks before the murder. Romero stole Medina's cell phone from the scene of the killing. Police later used the phone's location data to assist in tracking him. Romero was arrested on December 9, 2023, and booked into the Jackson County Jail. A magistrate set his bond at $2 million. U.S. Immigration and Customs Enforcement placed a detainer on him due to his immigration status.

== Legal proceedings ==
A Jackson County grand jury indicted Romero on February 5, 2024, on capital murder charges, alleging that he committed the murder during an attempted burglary, robbery, or aggravated sexual assault. In late 2024, Romero's legal team filed a motion for a behavioral health evaluation to support an insanity defense. Jacqueline rejected the attempt, telling reporters that he "knew what he was doing." In February 2025, a Jackson County judge found Romero mentally able to stand trial.

On September 25, 2025, Romero pleaded guilty to murder, aggravated robbery with a deadly weapon, and burglary of a habitation. He was sentenced to two concurrent life terms for the murder and robbery charges, and an additional 20-year sentence for the burglary. He is eligible for parole after 30 years. As part of this agreement, Romero waived all appellate rights.

Jacqueline Medina stated that she had not been consulted about the plea agreement and had hoped for a sentence of life without parole or the death penalty. "They lied completely," she said. "They lied to my attorney, they lied to me and they lied to the judge." The Jackson County District Attorney's Office contested this claim, issuing a press release stating that the agreement "was the only offer ever discussed or conveyed" and had been communicated to all relevant parties for more than six months. Assistant District Attorney Stephen Tyler drew public criticism after appearing to justify the decision not to pursue the death penalty on financial grounds in a comment on a local news Facebook page, writing that a capital case would cost "several millions of local dollars from arrest to grave." District Attorney Pam Guenther later apologized for the comments and stated that finances played no role in the charging decision.

== Political reactions ==
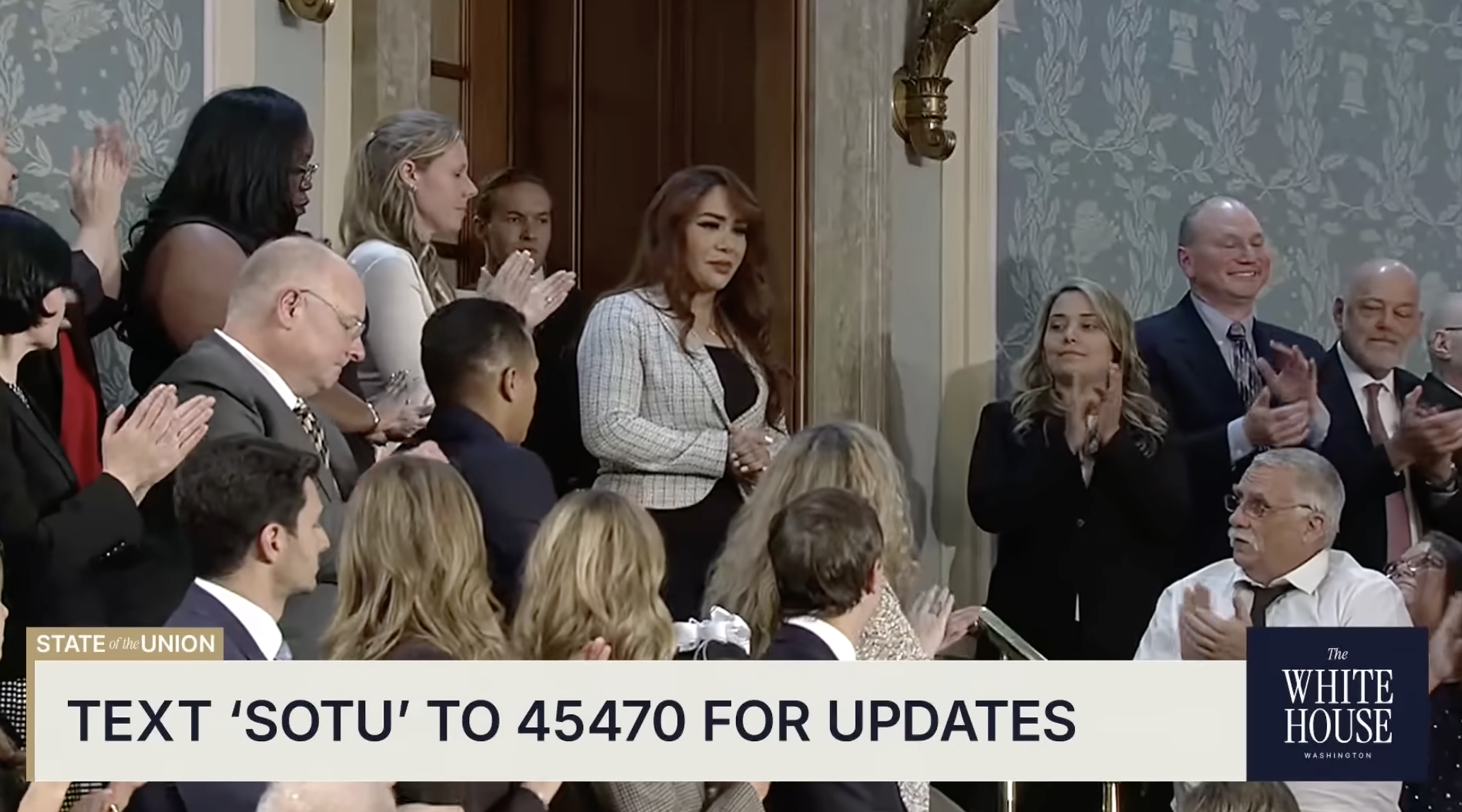
Jacqueline Medina receives a standing ovation in the House gallery during the 2026 State of the Union Address, February 24, 2026. She attended as a guest of Donald Trump.

On February 24, 2026, President Donald Trump recalled Medina's murder during his 2026 State of the Union Address. Jacqueline Medina came to the address, and sat in the House gallery as his guest. Trump described the killing in detail to call for stricter immigration enforcement. Immigration restrictionist groups across the United States, including The Remembrance Project, had previously drawn attention to the case.

Jacqueline Medina accepted Trump's invitation not as a political endorsement, but solely to honor her daughter. "My daughter, Lizbeth Medina, was not a headline. She was my child," she said. "I accepted the invitation because I made a promise to her."

== See also ==
- 2026 State of the Union Address
