= Elizabeth Township, Pennsylvania =

Elizabeth Township is the name of at least two townships in the U.S. state of Pennsylvania:

- Elizabeth Township, Allegheny County, Pennsylvania
- Elizabeth Township, Lancaster County, Pennsylvania
