= USS Elizabeth (SP-972) =

Patrol vessel of the United States Navy

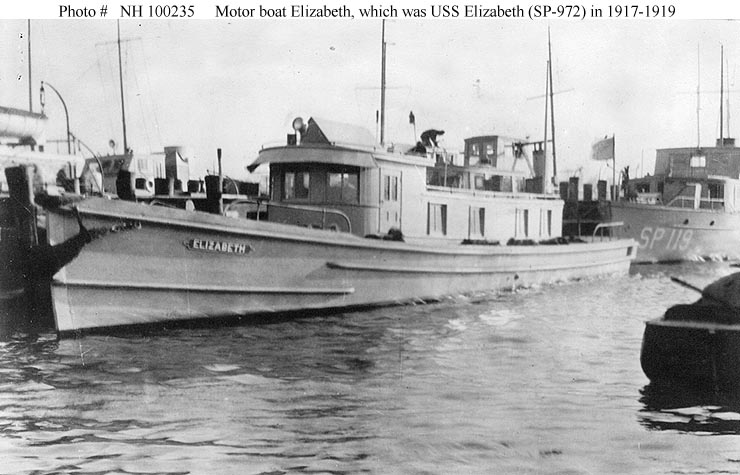
- Elizabeth as a commercial motorboat, possibly in 1917 prior to her United States Navy service. The patrol vessel USS Idylease (SP-119) is astern of her.

History

United States
- Name: USS Elizabeth
- Namesake: Previous name retained
- Completed: 1916
- Acquired: 4 October 1917
- In service: 1917 (non-commissioned)
- Out of service: 1919
- Commissioned: late May 1919 in ordinary
- Fate: Transferred to U.S. Department of War 10 November 1919
- Notes: Operated as commercial motorboat Elizabeth 1916-1917

General characteristics
- Type: Patrol vessel
- Length: 53 ft 1 in (16.18 m)

The first USS Elizabeth (SP-972) was a United States Navy patrol vessel in service from 1917 to 1919.

Elizabeth was built as a civilian motorboat of the same name in 1916 at West Norfolk, Virginia, and apparently was employed commercially as a ship chandler's workboat. In August 1917 she was ordered turned over to the U.S. Navy for use as a section patrol boat during World War I. She was delivered to the Navy on 4 October 1917, and placed in non-commissioned service as Elizabeth (SP-972) soon thereafter.

Assigned to the 5th Naval District, Elizabeth took up patrol duties in the Norfolk, Virginia, area. On 12 December 1917, she collided with the American steamship SS Northland and sank with the loss of two lives, but she was raised, repaired, and resumed her patrol duties for the rest of World War I and into 1919.

Taken out of service in 1919, Elizabeth was commissioned in ordinary as USS Elizabeth (SP-972) late in May 1919 and ordered sold. Withdrawn from sale in October 1919, she instead was transferred to the United States Department of War on 10 November 1919 for use by the United States Army.

Elizabeth should not be confused with another patrol boat, USS Elizabeth (SP-1092), which was in commission in 1917–1918.
