= USS Elizabeth (SP-1092) =

Patrol vessel of the United States Navy

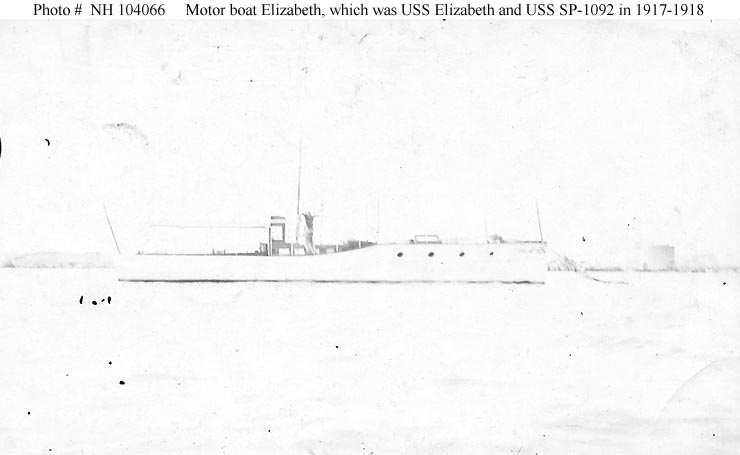
- An overexposed photograph of Elizabeth as a private motorboat sometime prior to her United States Navy service.

History

United States
- Name: USS Elizabeth; Later USS SP-1092
- Namesake: Elizabeth was her previous name retained; SP-1092 was her section patrol number
- Builder: Gulf Fisheries Company, Galveston, Texas
- Acquired: Acquired October 1917; Delivered ca. 2 November 1917
- Commissioned: 1917
- Renamed: SP-1092, probably 1918
- Stricken: 15 November 1918
- Fate: Wrecked 15 November 1918
- Notes: Operated as private motorboat Elizabeth until 1917

General characteristics
- Type: Patrol vessel
- Length: 55 ft (17 m)

The second USS Elizabeth (SP-1092) was a United States Navy patrol vessel in commission from 1917 to 1918.

Elizabeth was built as a private motorboat of the same name by the Gulf Fisheries Company at Galveston, Texas, for use as a pleasure craft. In October 1917, the U.S. Navy acquired her from her owner, W. L. Moody Jr. of Galveston, for use as a section patrol boat during World War I. Moody delivered her to the Navy on or about 2 November 1917, and she was commissioned as USS Elizabeth (SP-1092).

Assigned to the 8th Naval District, Elizabeth carried out patrol duties along the United States Gulf Coast for the rest of World War I. She eventually (presumably sometime in 1918) was renamed USS SP-1092, apparently to avoid confusion with another patrol boat, Elizabeth (SP-972), which was in service from 1917 to 1919.

On 15 November 1918, four days after the end of the war, SP-1092 was wrecked at the mouth of the Brazos River, near Freeport, Texas. She was stricken from the Navy Directory the same day.
