= Spanish ship Isabel II =

Various Spanish Navy ships

Six ships of the Spanish Navy have borne the name Isabel II, after Queen Isabella II of Spain (1830–1904):

- Spanish schooner Isabel II (1832), a three-gun schooner acquired in 1832 and wrecked in 1856.
- Spanish schooner Isabel II (1834), a five-gun schooner built as the British Wave in 1831 and acquired in 1834. Initially named Isabela, then quickly renamed Isabel and then Isabel II. Decommissioned in 1844, converted into the packet boat Gaditano, and served as such from 1849 to 1864.
- Isabel II, a paddle steamer acquired in 1834 and armed for use as a gunboat. Wrecked in 1860. Previously the British commercial steamer SS Royal William from 1831 to 1834.
- Spanish frigate Isabel II, a frigate built in 1836, hulked in 1860, and decommissioned in 1865.
- Spanish gunboat Isabel II, an armed paddle steamer launched in 1850, renamed Ciudad de Cádiz in 1868, and decommissioned in 1882.
- Spanish cruiser Isabel II, a Velasco-class unprotected cruiser commissioned in 1887, decommissioned and hulked in 1900, and discarded in 1935.

== See also ==
- Spanish cruiser Infanta Isabel, a Velasco-class unprotected cruiser commissioned in 1887 and decommissioned in 1926.
