= Spin art =

Abstract art form

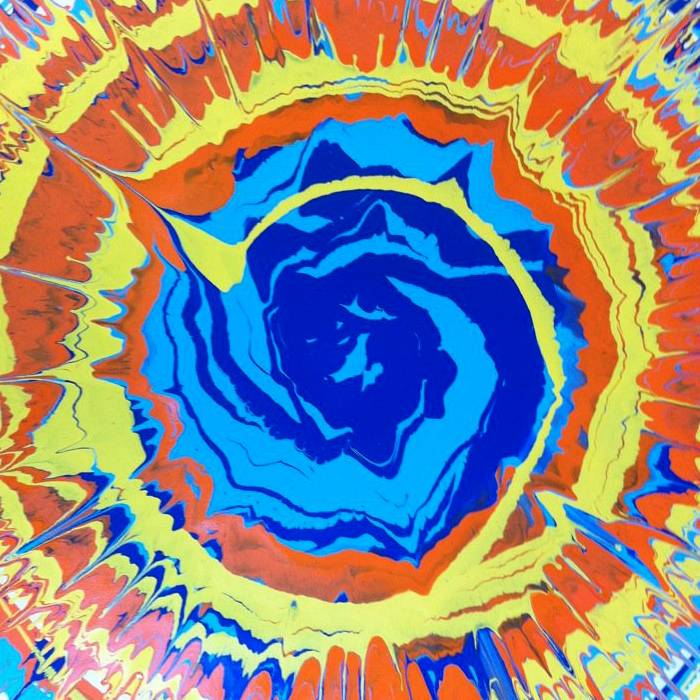
An example of spin art

Spin art is an art form that uses paint, a canvas such as glossy cardboard and a spinning platform. It is primarily used to entertain and expose children to the process of art creation, although it can be enjoyed by people of all ages.

== Techniques ==
Spin art time lapse

To create spin art, an artist initially decorates or drips paint onto a canvas. The canvas can be anything; however, the most common form of canvas is a small rectangular piece of cardboard. Before the paint on the canvas dries, the artist secures the canvas to a platform that can be rotated at high speed. Once the canvas is secure, the artist can then begin spinning the canvas. Most spinning platforms are electrical or battery operated, with more elaborate platforms enabling the artist to vary the rotational speed.

As the canvas rotates, centrifugal forces draw the wet paint outwards, creating intricate designs. The artist can drip more paint onto the canvas while it is spinning, thus layering paints on top of each other, creating different effects. Using different colors, a skilled spin artist can blend colors together into subtle designs. At any point during this process, the artist can stop the spinning platform to view the canvas. Since the canvas is usually rotating at a high rate, it is difficult if not impossible to view the image on the canvas until the platform has stopped spinning, thus creating a sense of surprise and uncertainty during the creation process.

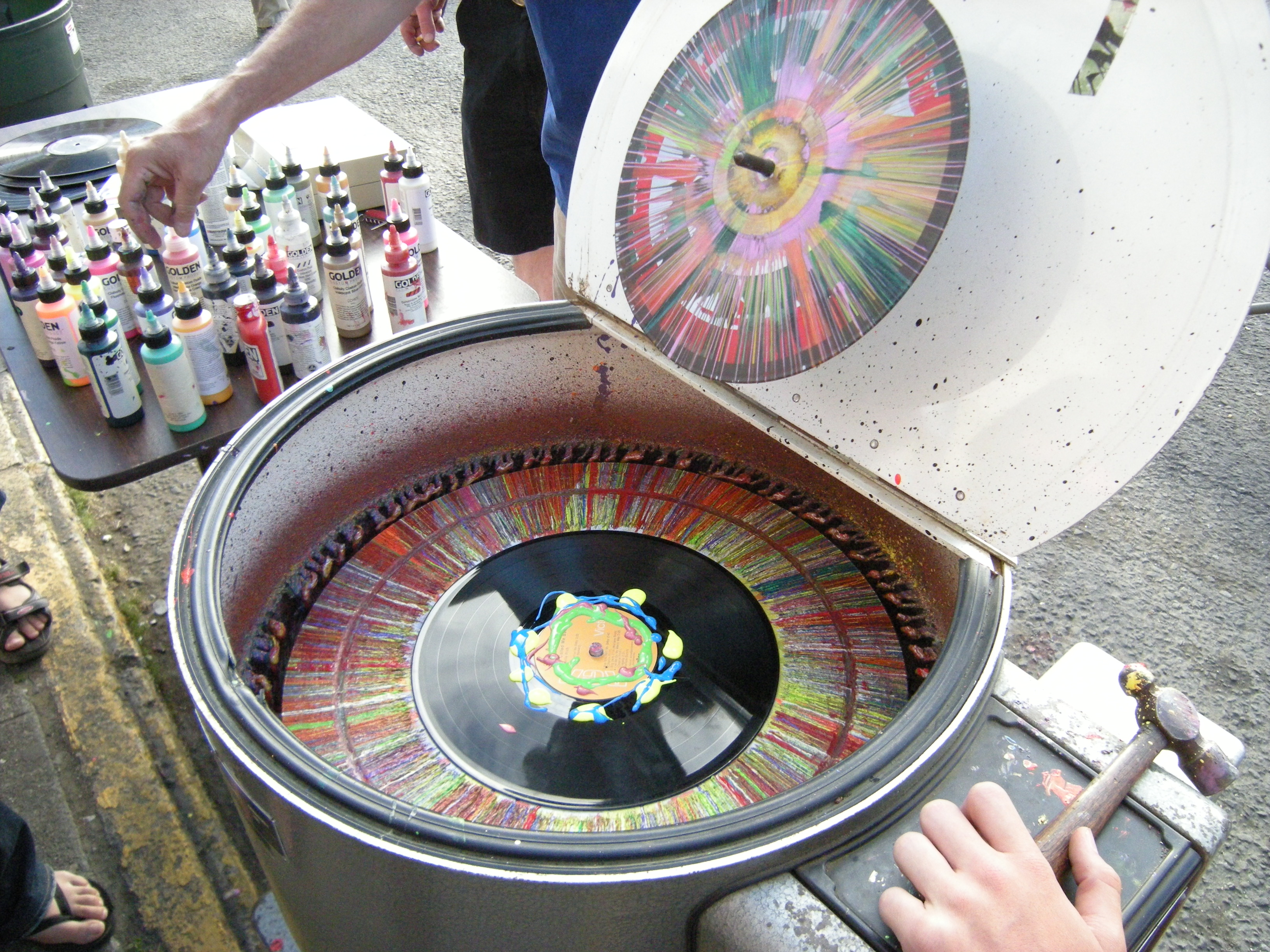
Making spin art on old phonograph records. Paint is applied…

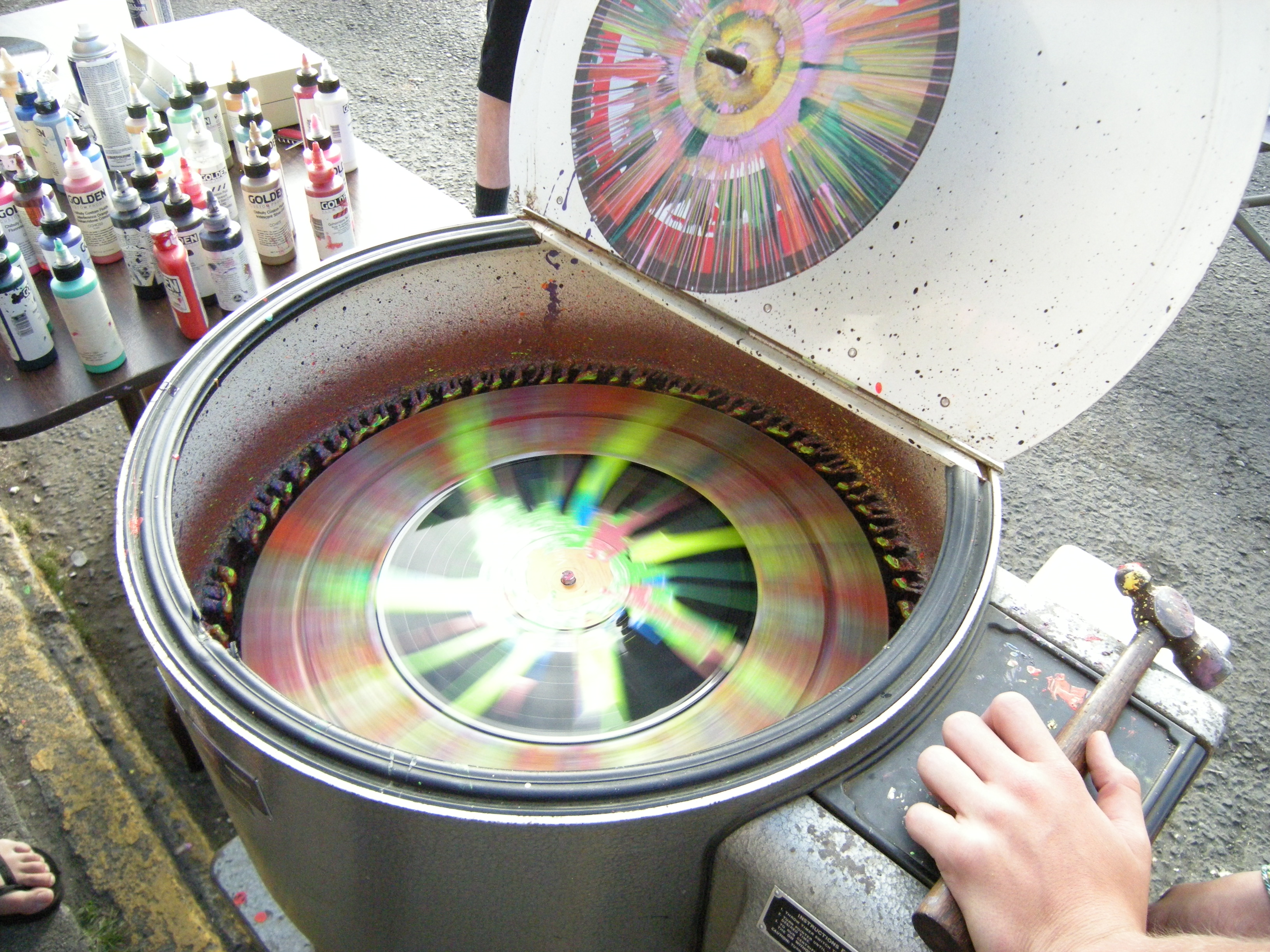
…and the disc is spun at a rapid rate…

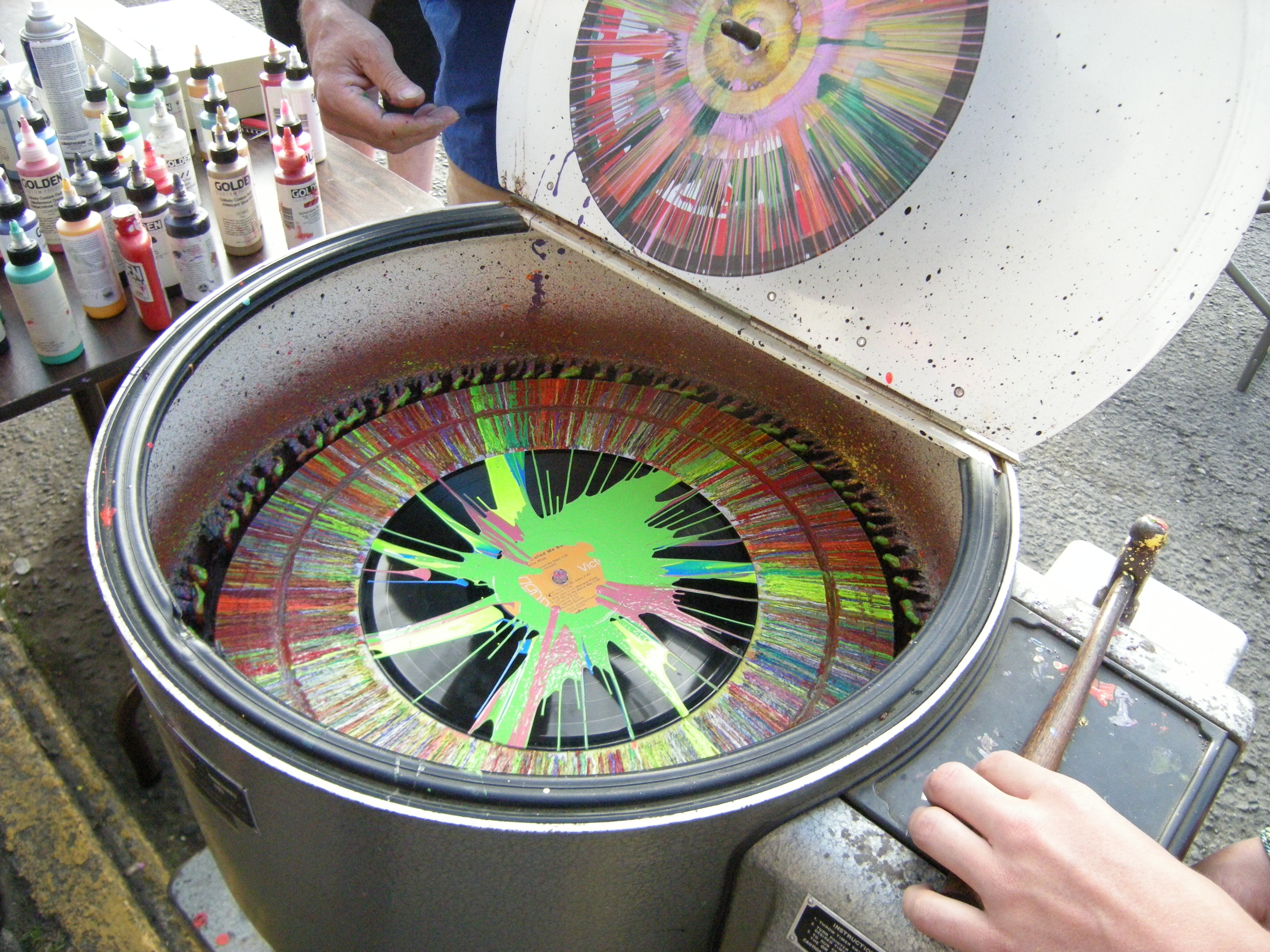
…resulting in a spin art piece.

== Fine art ==
Spin painting, oil on plexiglas by Annick Gendron (1969)

Since the 1960s, spin art has been seen in the works of certain contemporary artists. The artists using this technique often reconfigure their own machines by incorporating a more powerful engine than those belonging to schools.

Beautiful revolving sphincter, oops brown painting by Damien Hirst (2003)

Professional artists:

Alfons Schilling

Alfons Schilling was one of the first artists to become interested in spin art, in the 1960s. His action painting also had a large influence on his work and added to its originality. Instead of installing it vertically, he decided to install the artwork horizontally.

Annick Gendron

From 1968 to 1973, the French artist Annick Gendron used industrial wheels to spin paint on Plexiglas. At the end of the 1960s, she was one of the first artist to use centrifugal force to produce large-sized artworks. Inspired by children's games: spin art and spin painting, her goal was to transcend this modest use to get the most spectacular effects from it. Damien Hirst was inspired by this idea in the 1990s, as he transcends the original practice, by the use of more spectacular materials, sizes, shapes, and skill improvement. Her work has been shown at the Raymond Duncan Gallery, at the Bernheim-Jeune Gallery, at the Salon des Indépendants and Surindependant at the Musée d'Art Moderne de Paris, at the Salon des Artistes Français at the Grand Palais and the Salon d'Automne in Paris.

Damien Hirst

From 1995, the British artist Damien Hirst started a series of spin paintings. His finished pieces are circular in shape and mounted onto steel frames. This is a series of original works of art and screen prints. He was inspired by memories of the technique of spin painting which he saw as a child on the BBC's Blue Peter.

Lawrence Stafford

During the late 1960s developed a spinning rotating machine on which he attached raw canvas and sprayed acrylic paint while the drum spun. He exhibited those abstract paintings in the United States and in Germany in 1968-1969. Several are in important museum collections including the Whitney Museum of American Art.
