= Princess Isabella =

Princess Isabella may refer to:

- Isabella of Armenia, Princess of Tyre (1275–1323)
- Isabella of Armenia, Princess of Tyre (c. 1278–c. 1321), daughter of Leo III
- Isabel Moctezuma (1509–1550/1510–1550/1551), daughter of the Aztec ruler Moctezuma II
- Isabel Luísa, Princess of Beira (1668–1690), Portugal
- Princess Isabella of Parma (1741–1763), wife to Joseph II, Holy Roman Emperor
- Infanta Isabel Maria of Braganza (1801–1876)
- Isabel, Princess Imperial of Brazil (1846–1921), daughter and heir of Pedro II, Emperor of Brazil
- Infanta Isabel, Countess of Girgenti (1851–1931)
- Princess Isabella of Croÿ (1856–1931), wife of Archduke Friedrich, Duke of Teschen
- Princess Isabella of Bavaria (1863–1924)
- Princess Isabelle of Orléans (1878–1961)
- Princess Isabelle of Orléans (1900–1983)
- Princess Isabel Alfonsa of Bourbon-Two Sicilies (1904–1985)
- Princess Amalie Isabella of Bavaria (1921–1985)
- Princess Isabella of Denmark (born 2007), daughter of King Frederik X and Queen Mary of Denmark
- Princess Isabel, a character in Elena of Avalor

== See also ==
- Princess Marie Isabelle of Orléans (1848–1919), wife of Philippe d'Orléans, Count of Paris
- Princess Elizabeth (disambiguation)
- Princess Isabelle (disambiguation)
- Queen Isabella (disambiguation)
