= Elizabeth the Queen Mother (disambiguation) =

Elizabeth the Queen Mother (1900–2002) was the consort of George VI, King of the United Kingdom, and mother of Elizabeth II.

Elizabeth the Queen Mother or Elisabeth the Queen Mother may also refer to:

- Elisabeth of Bavaria, Queen of Germany (c. 1227 – 1273), consort of Conrad IV, King of Sicily, and mother of Conradin, King of Sicily
- Elizabeth the Cuman (1244–1290), consort of Stephen V, King of Hungary, and mother of Ladislaus IV, King of Hungary
- Elisabeth of Carinthia, Queen of the Romans (c. 1262 – 1312), consort of Albert I, King of the Romans, and mother of Rudolf I, King of Bohemia
- Elizabeth of Portugal (1271–1336), consort of Denis, King of Portugal, and mother of Afonso IV, King of Portugal
- Elizabeth of Carinthia, Queen of Sicily (1298–1352), consort of King Peter II and mother of King Louis the Child
- Elizabeth of Poland, Queen of Hungary (1305–1380), consort of King Charles I and mother of King Louis
- Elizabeth of Bosnia (c. 1339 – 1387), consort of Louis I, King of Hungary, and mother of Mary, Queen of Hungary
- Elizabeth of Pomerania (c. 1347 – 1393), consort of Charles IV, Holy Roman Emperor, and mother of Sigismund, Holy Roman Emperor
- Elisabeth of Bavaria-Ingolstadt (c. 1370 – 1435), consort of Charles VI, King of France, and mother of Charles VII, King of France
- Elizabeth of Austria (1436–1505), consort of King Casimir IV Jagiellon and mother of King John I Albert and King Alexander Jagiellon
- Elizabeth of Luxembourg (1409–1442), consort of Albert II, King of Bohemia, and mother of Ladislaus the Posthumous, King of Bohemia
- Elizabeth Woodville (c. 1437 – 1492), consort of Edward IV, King of England, and mother of Edward V, King of England
- Elisabeth Farnese (1692–1766), consort of Philip V, King of Spain, and mother of Charles III, King of Spain
- Elisabeth of Bavaria, Queen of the Belgians (1876–1965), consort of King Albert I and mother of King Leopold III

== See also ==
- Queen Elizabeth (disambiguation)
- Queen mother (disambiguation)
