= HMS Elizabeth (1769) =

Ship of the line of the Royal Navy

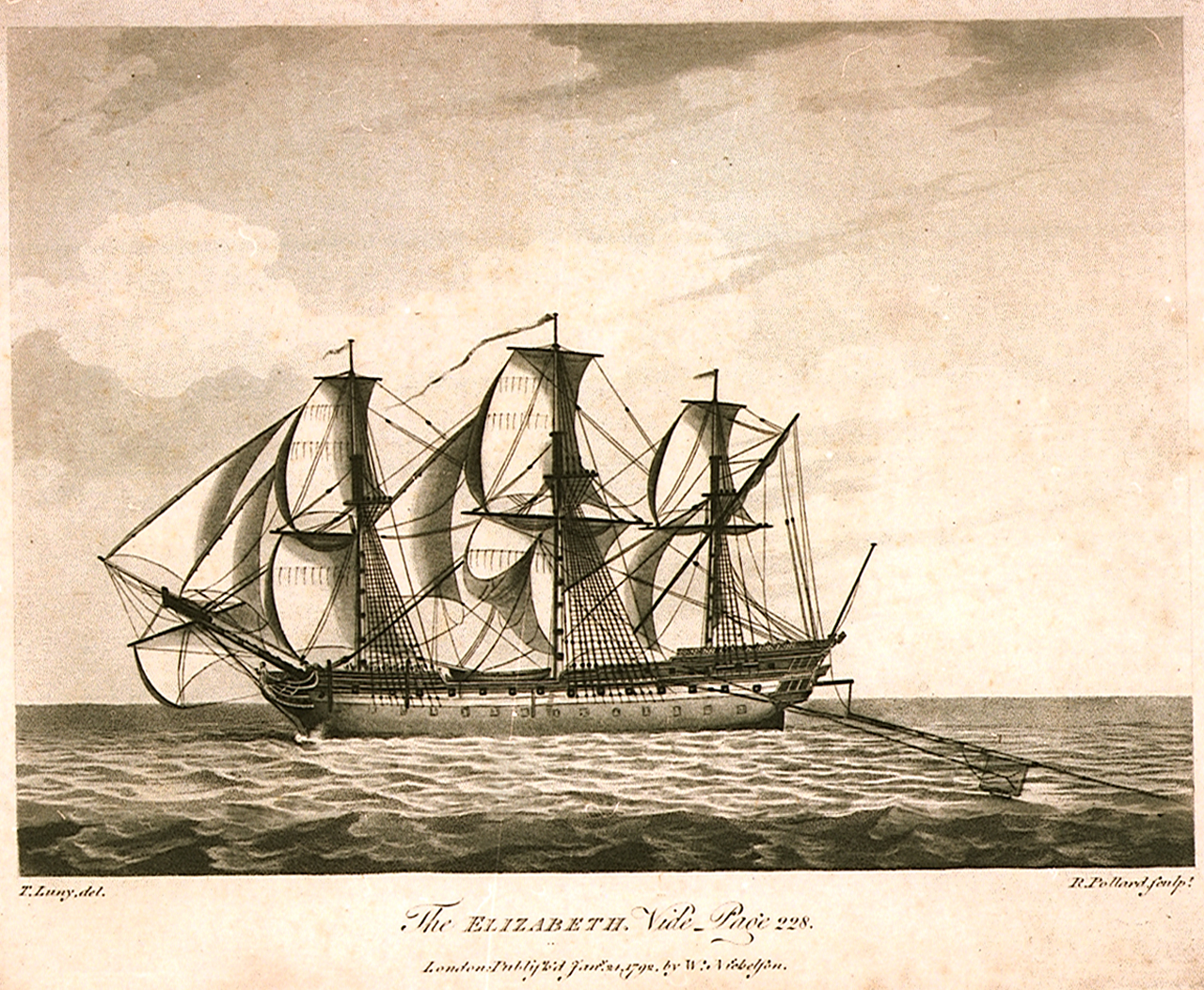
- Elizabeth as drawn by Thomas Luny

History

Great Britain
- Name: HMS Elizabeth
- Ordered: 6 November 1765
- Builder: Portsmouth Dockyard
- Laid down: 6 May 1766
- Launched: 17 October 1769
- Fate: Broken up, 1797

General characteristics
- Class & type: Elizabeth-class ship of the line
- Tons burthen: 1617 bm
- Length: 168 ft 6 in (51.36 m) (gundeck)
- Beam: 46 ft (14 m)
- Depth of hold: 19 ft 9 in (6.02 m)
- Propulsion: Sails
- Sail plan: Full-rigged ship
- Armament: Gundeck: 28 × 32-pounder guns; Upper gundeck: 28 × 18-pounder guns; QD: 14 × 9-pounder guns; Fc: 4 × 9-pounder guns

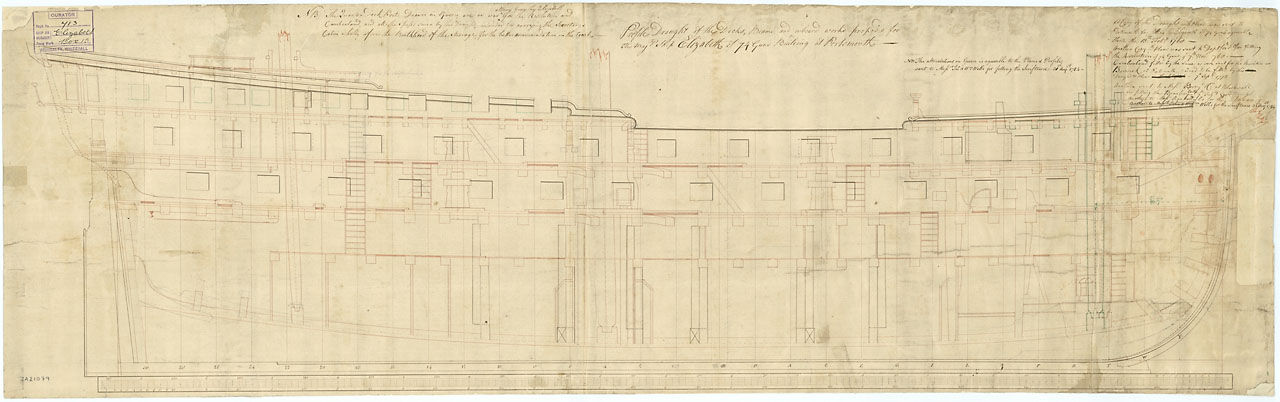
The approved plan showing the inboard profile for Elizabeth, 1769

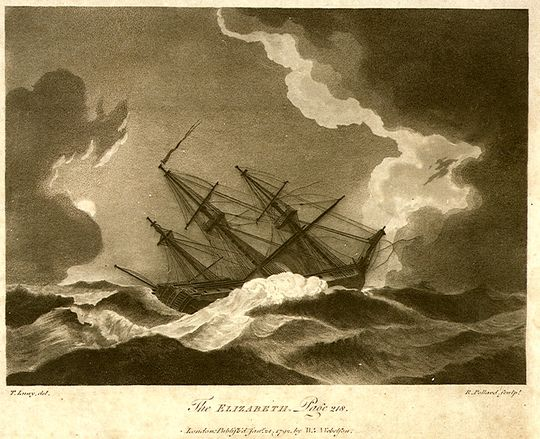
HMS Elizabeth in a storm circa 1791

HMS Elizabeth was a 74-gun third rate ship of the line of the Royal Navy, launched on 17 October 1769 at Portsmouth Dockyard.

In 1778 James Bisset served on the ship as a newly commissioned lieutenant under Captain Frederick Maitland. Maitland had married Bisset's first cousin, Margaret Louisa Dick of Edinburgh.

She was broken up in 1797.
