= Lizbeth Marano =

American artist

Lizbeth Marano (born 1950) is an American artist and photographer. Her work is included in the collections of the Whitney Museum of American Art and the Princeton University Art Museum.
