= Isabella, Princess of Asturias =

Isabella, Princess of Asturias may refer to:

- Isabella, Princess of Asturias (1470–1498), Queen of Portugal
- Isabella, Princess of Asturias (1851–1931)
- Isabella I of Castile
- Elisabeth of Bourbon, wife of Philip IV of Spain
- Isabella II of Spain
