= Queen Isabella =

Queen Isabella may refer to:

- Isabella of Urgell, Queen of Aragon
- Isabella of Hainault (1170–1190), queen consort of France
- Isabella I of Jerusalem (1172–1205), queen regnant
- Isabella of Angoulême (1188–1246), queen consort England
- Isabella II of Jerusalem (1212–1228), queen regnant, also known as Yolande
- Isabella of England (1214–1241), queen consort of Germany and of Sicily
- Isabella, Queen of Armenia (died 1252), queen regnant
- Isabella of France, Queen of Navarre (1241–1271), queen consort of Navarre
- Isabella of Aragon (1247–1271), queen consort of France
- Isabella of Ibelin (1241–1324), queen consort of Cyprus
- Isabella of Ibelin (1252–1282), queen consort of Cyprus
- Isabella of Burgundy, Queen of Germany (1270–1323), queen consort of Germany
- Elizabeth of Aragon (1271–1336), queen consort of Portugal
- Isabel Bruce, (c. 1272–1358), queen consort of Norway
- Isabella of Castile, Queen of Aragon (1283–1328), Queen of Aragon
- Isabella of France (1295–1358), queen consort of England
- Isabella of Aragon, Queen of Germany (1305–1330), queen consort of Germany
- Isabella of Majorca (1337–1406), titular queen consort
- Isabeau of Bavaria (1369–1435), queen consort of France
- Isabella of Valois (1389–1409), queen consort of England
- Isabella, Duchess of Lorraine (1400–1453), queen consort of Naples
- Isabella of Clermont (1424–1465), queen consort of Naples
- Isabella of Portugal, Queen of Castile (1428–1496), queen consort of Castile
- Isabel of Coimbra (1432–1455), queen consort of Portugal
- Isabella I of Castile (1451–1504), queen regnant
- Isabella del Balzo (1465–1533), queen consort of Naples
- Isabella, Princess of Asturias (1470–1498), queen consort of Portugal
- Isabella of Austria (1501–1526), queen consort of Denmark, Norway and Sweden
- Isabella of Portugal (1503–1539), queen consort of Aragon and Castile
- Isabella Jagiellon (1519–1559), queen consort of Hungary
- Isabella II of Spain (1830–1904), queen regnant

== See also ==
- Isabel (disambiguation)
- Isabella (given name)
- Princess Isabella (disambiguation)
- Princess Isabelle (disambiguation)
- Queen Elizabeth (disambiguation)
- Empress Isabella (disambiguation)
