= Empress Elisabeth (disambiguation) =

Empress Elizabeth (1709–1761) was the empress of Russia from 1741 until her death.

Empress Elisabeth or Empress Elizabeth may also refer to:

- Isabella of Portugal (1503–1539), Holy Roman Empress by marriage to Charles V
- Elisabeth Christine of Brunswick-Wolfenbüttel (1691–1750), Holy Roman Empress by marriage to Charles VI
- Elizabeth Alexeievna (Louise of Baden) (1779–1826), Empress of Russia by marriage to Alexander I
- Elisabeth in Bavaria (1837–1898), Empress of Austria by her marriage to Franz Joseph I; character in Kenneth MacMillan's ballet Mayerling
- Elizabeth Bowes-Lyon (1900–2002), Empress of India by marriage to George VI
- Wanrong (1906–1946), Empress of Manchukuo by marriage to Xuantong Emperor (Puyi) and adopted Western name Elizabeth

== See also ==
- Princess Elizabeth (disambiguation)
- Queen Elizabeth (disambiguation)
- Empress Isabella (disambiguation)
