= HMS Queen Elizabeth =

HMS Queen Elizabeth could refer to one of three ships named in honour of Elizabeth I of England:

- HMS Queen Elizabeth (1913) was the lead ship of the Queen Elizabeth-class battleships, launched in 1913 and scrapped in 1948
- HMS Queen Elizabeth was to have been the first of the 1960s planned CVA-01-class aircraft carriers, but the class was never constructed
- HMS Queen Elizabeth (R08) is the first ship of the Queen Elizabeth-class aircraft carriers, launched in 2014, on sea trials as of June 2017 and commissioned in December 2017

== Battle honours ==
- Dardanelles 1915
- Crete 1941
- Sabang 1944
- Burma 1944–45
- East Indies 1945

== See also ==
- HMS Elizabeth
