= Elizabeth-class ship of the line =

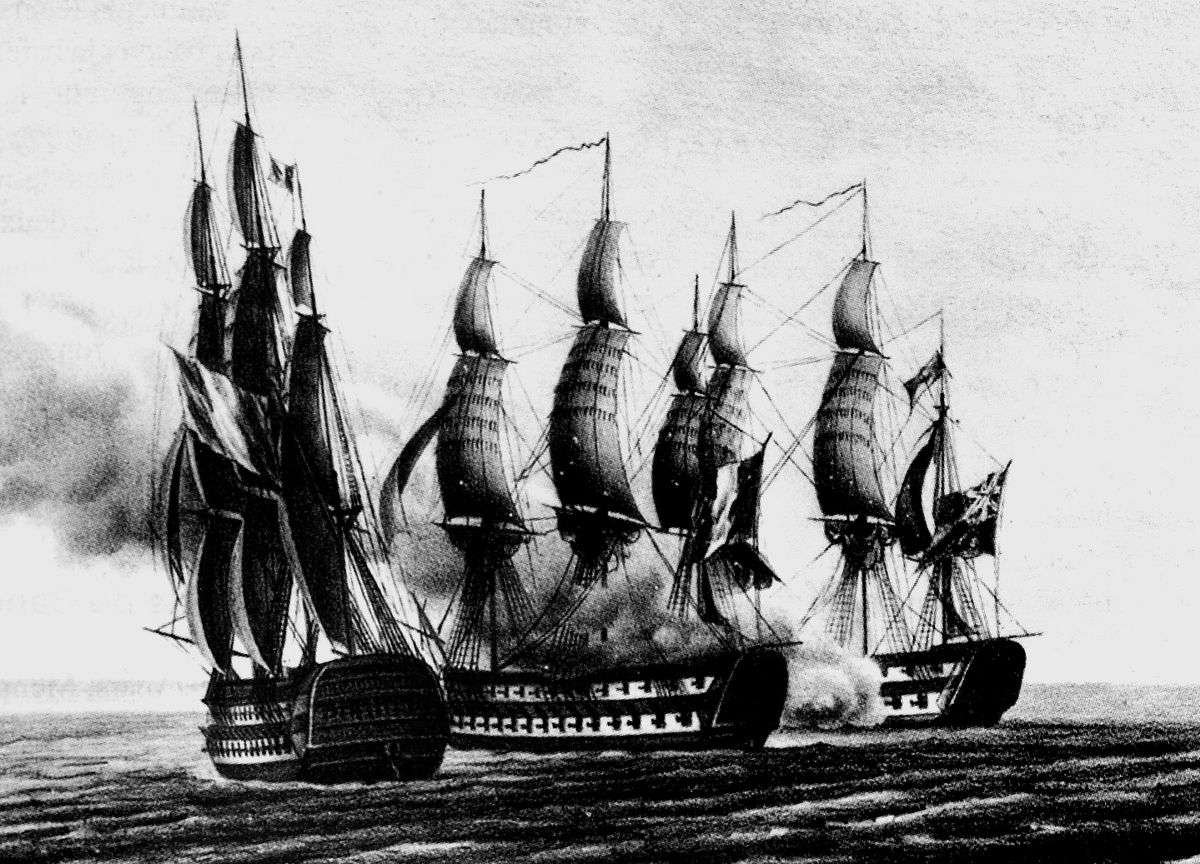
- Capture of HMS Swiftsure by Indivisible and Dix-Août

Class overview
- Name: Elizabeth
- Operators: Royal Navy; French Navy
- Preceded by: Albion class
- Succeeded by: Royal Oak class
- In service: 17 October 1769 – 1817
- Completed: 8
- Lost: 2

General characteristics
- Type: Ship of the line
- Length: 168 ft 6 in (51.36 m) (gundeck); 139 ft 3 3/8 in (42.453 m) (keel)
- Beam: 46 ft (14 m)
- Propulsion: Sails
- Armament: 74 guns: Gundeck: 28 × 32-pounders; Upper gundeck: 28 × 18-pounders; Quarterdeck: 14 × 9-pounders; Forecastle: 4 × 9-pounders
- Notes: Ships in class include: Elizabeth, Resolution, Cumberland, Berwick, Bombay Castle, Powerful, Defiance, Swiftsure

The Elizabeth-class ships of the line were a class of eight 74-gun third rates, designed for the Royal Navy by Sir Thomas Slade.

== Ships ==
Ships of the Elizabeth class
Name	Builder	Ordered	Launched	Fate
HMS Elizabeth	Portsmouth Dockyard	6 November 1765	17 October 1769	Broken up, 1797
HMS Resolution	Deptford Dockyard	16 September 1766	12 April 1770	Broken up, 1813
HMS Cumberland	Deptford Dockyard	8 June 1768	29 March 1774	Broken up, 1804
HMS Berwick	Portsmouth Dockyard	12 October 1768	18 April 1775	Wrecked, 1805
HMS Bombay Castle	Perry, Blackwall Yard	14 July 1779	14 June 1782	Wrecked, 1796
HMS Powerful	Perry, Blackwall Yard	8 July 1780	3 April 1783	Broken up, 1812
HMS Defiance	Randall, Rotherhithe	11 July 1780	10 December 1783	Broken up, 1817
HMS Swiftsure	Wells, Deptford	19 June 1782	4 April 1787	Broken up, 1816
