= Queen Elizabeth =

Queen Elizabeth, Queen Elisabeth or Elizabeth the Queen may refer to:

== Queens regnant ==
- Elizabeth I (1533–1603; r. 1558–1603), Queen of England and Ireland
- Elizabeth II (1926–2022; r. 1952–2022), Queen of the United Kingdom and other Commonwealth realms
- Queen Betty (reign began c. 1686, died either c. 1708 or c. 1723 as Queen Ann (Pamunkey chief) ), Weroansqua (chief) of the Pamunkey tribe

== Queens regent ==
- Elizabeth the Cuman (1239/1240–1290), queen consort and queen regent of Hungary
- Elizabeth of Carinthia, Queen of Sicily (1298–1352), queen consort and regent of Sicily
- Elizabeth of Poland, Queen of Hungary (1305–1380), queen consort of Hungary, regent of Poland
- Elizabeth Kaʻahumanu (c. 1768–1832), queen consort and queen regent of Hawaiʻi
- Elizabeth Kīnaʻu (c. 1805–1839), queen consort, queen regent and dowager queen of Hawaiʻi

== Queens consort ==
=== Bohemia, Hungary, and Poland ===
- Elizabeth of Sicily (1261–1303), queen consort of Hungary
- Elizabeth Richeza of Poland (1286–1335), queen consort of Bohemia and Poland
- Elizabeth of Bohemia (1292–1330), queen consort of Bohemia
- Elizabeth of Poland (1305–1380), queen consort of Hungary
- Elizabeth of Bosnia (1339–1387), queen consort and queen dowager of Hungary and Poland, queen mother of Hungary
- Elizabeth Granowska (c. 1372–1420), queen consort of Poland
- Elizabeth of Austria (1436–1505), queen consort, queen dowager and queen mother of Poland
- Elizabeth of Austria (1526–1545), queen consort of Poland
- Elizabeth Stuart (1596–1662), the "Winter Queen", briefly queen consort of Bohemia
- Elisabeth Christine of Brunswick-Wolfenbüttel (1691–1750), queen consort of Hungary, Croatia, and Bohemia
- Elisabeth of Bavaria (1837–1898), queen consort of Hungary, Croatia, and Bohemia

=== Castile and Leon, Portugal, and Spain ===
- Elisabeth of Swabia (1205–1235), also known as Beatrice of Swabia, queen consort of Castile and León
- Elizabeth of Portugal (1271–1336), also known as Saint Elizabeth of Portugal, queen consort of Portugal
- Elisabeth of Valois (1545–1568), queen consort of Spain
- Elisabeth of France (1602–1644), queen consort of Spain and Portugal
- Elisabeth Farnese (1692–1766), queen consort, queen dowager and queen mother of Spain
- Louise Élisabeth d'Orléans (1709–1742), queen consort of Spain

=== England, Scotland, and the United Kingdom ===
- Elizabeth de Burgh (1289–1327), queen consort of Scotland
- Elizabeth Woodville (1437–1492), queen consort, queen dowager and queen mother of England
- Elizabeth of York (1466–1503), queen consort of England
- Elizabeth Bowes-Lyon (1900–2002), queen consort, queen dowager and queen mother of the United Kingdom and the British Dominions

=== France ===
- Elisabeth of Bavaria-Ingolstadt or Isabeau of Bavaria (c. 1370–1435), queen consort of France
- Elisabeth of Austria (1554–1592), queen consort of France

=== Germany ===
- Elisabeth of Bavaria (c. 1227–1273), queen consort of Germany, Jerusalem and Sicily
- Elisabeth of Brunswick-Lüneburg (c. 1230–1266), queen consort of the Romans
- Elisabeth of Carinthia (c. 1262–1312), queen consort of Germany
- Elizabeth of Pomerania (1347–1393), queen consort and queen dowager of the Romans, Bohemia, Italy and Burgundy
- Elisabeth of Nuremberg (1358–1411), queen consort of the Romans
- Elizabeth of Luxembourg (1409–1442), queen consort of the Romans, Hungary, Bohemia and Croatia

=== Prussia ===
- Elisabeth Christine of Brunswick-Wolfenbüttel-Bevern (1715–1797), queen consort and queen dowager of Prussia
- Elisabeth Ludovika of Bavaria (1801–1873), queen consort of Prussia

=== Other countries ===
- Elisiv of Kiev (1025–c. 1067), also known as Elisaveta Yaroslavna, queen consort of Norway
- Elizabeth of Hungary (1255–1313), queen consort of Serbia
- Elizabeth of Carinthia (1298–1352), queen consort of Sicily
- Elizabeth of Holstein-Rendsburg (c. 1300–before 1340), junior queen consort of Denmark
- Elisabeth Therese of Lorraine (1711–1741), queen consort of Sardinia, Cyprus, Jerusalem and Armenia
- Elisabeth of Wied (1843–1916), queen consort and queen dowager of Romania
- Elisabeth of Bavaria (1876–1965), queen consort, queen dowager, and queen mother of the Belgians
- Elisabeth of Romania (1894–1956), queen consort of the Hellenes

== Ships ==
- HMS Queen Elizabeth, several ships of the Royal Navy
- MS Queen Elizabeth, Cunard cruise ship launched in 2010
- RMS Queen Elizabeth, Cunard ocean liner launched 1938, retired 1968
- Queen Elizabeth 2, Cunard ocean liner launched in 1969, retired 2008
- Queen Elizabeth-class (disambiguation), several classes of ships

== Arts and media ==
- Queen Elizabeth (band), a British experimental music project featuring Thighpaulsandra and Julian Cope
- Les Amours de la reine Élisabeth (Queen Elizabeth), a 1912 film starring Sarah Bernhardt
- Elizabeth the Queen (play), 1930, by Maxwell Anderson
- Queen Elizabeth (1940 film), a Hungarian film directed by Félix Podmaniczky
- Queen Elizabeth (2023 film), an Indian Malayalam-language film
- Elizabeth the Queen (film), a 1968 TV movie
- HMS Queen Elizabeth March, march music composed in 2012
- Elizabeth X, queen of Starship UK in the Doctor Who episode "The Beast Below"

== Other uses ==
- Queen Elizabeth, Saskatoon, a suburban neighborhood in the city of Saskatoon, Saskatchewan, Canada
- Queen Elizabeth Hotel, a hotel in Montreal, Quebec, Canada, known as Le Reine Élizabeth
- Queen Liz (criminal), a 19th-century American criminal
- Queen Elizabeth II Centre, a conference facility in the City of Westminster
- Queen Elizabeth Hospital, Kota Kinabalu, a hospital in the city of Kota Kinabalu, Sabah, Malaysia

== See also ==
- Elizabeth I (disambiguation)
- Elizabeth II (disambiguation)
- Elizabeth the Queen Mother (disambiguation), lists queen consorts named Elizabeth that were also mothers of monarchs
- Empress Elisabeth (disambiguation)
- List of things named after Elizabeth II
- Princess Elizabeth (disambiguation)
- Queen Elizabeth Hospital (disambiguation)
- Queen Elizabeth School (disambiguation)
- Queen Isabella (disambiguation)
- Queen Elizabitch, an album by American rapper CupcakKe (born Elizabeth Harris), 2017
- State visits of Queen Elizabeth (disambiguation)
