= List of things named after Elizabeth II =

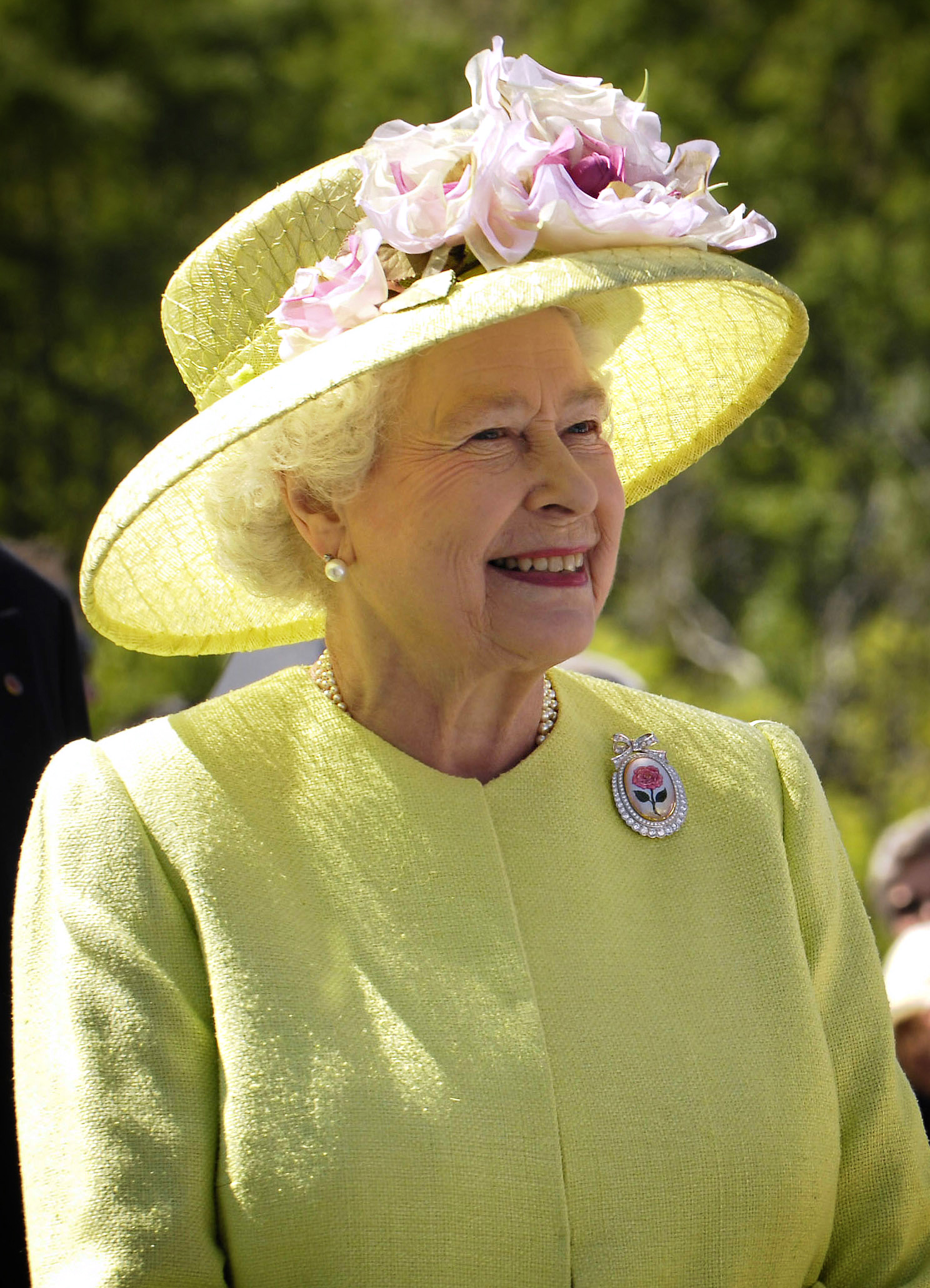
Elizabeth II was the reigning monarch of the United Kingdom and other Commonwealth realms from 6 February 1952 to 8 September 2022.

This is a list of places, buildings, roads and other things named after Elizabeth II. It is divided by category, and each item's location is noted in the entry.

== Awards and commemorative emblems ==
- Australia:
  - New South Wales: Queen Elizabeth Stakes (ATC), Randwick Racecourse, Sydney
  - Victoria: Queen Elizabeth Stakes (VRC), Flemington Racecourse, Melbourne
- Canada: Queen's Medal for Champion Shot
  - Ontario: Princess Elizabeth Stakes
- Hong Kong: Queen Elizabeth II Cup and Queen's Silver Jubilee Cup, both held in Sha Tin Racecourse, Sha Tin District
- India: Queen Elizabeth II Cup, Royal Calcutta Turf Club, Calcutta
- Japan: Queen Elizabeth II Cup (Queen Elizabeth II Commemorative Cup until 2012), Kyoto Racecourse, Fushimi-ku, Kyoto
- New Zealand: Queen's Service Order
- Singapore: Queen Elizabeth II Cup, Singapore Turf Club
- Turkey: Queen Elizabeth II Cup, Jockey Club of Turkey
- United Kingdom: Elizabeth Cross
- United Kingdom: Elizabeth Medal of Honour
- United Kingdom: Queen's Awards for Enterprise
- United Kingdom: Queen's Award for Enterprise Promotion
- United Kingdom: Queen's Award for Equestrianism
- United Kingdom: Queen's Award for Forestry
- United Kingdom: Queen's Award for Voluntary Service
- United Kingdom: Queen's Gallantry Medal (also bestowed on Commonwealth citizens)
- United Kingdom: Queen Elizabeth II Award for British Design
- United Kingdom: Queen Elizabeth II Coronation Award
- United Kingdom: Queen Elizabeth Prize for Engineering
  - England: Princess Elizabeth Challenge Cup
  - England: Princess Elizabeth Stakes
  - England: Queen Elizabeth II Stakes
  - England: Queen Elizabeth II Jubilee Stakes
- United States of America:
  - Kentucky: Queen Elizabeth II Challenge Cup Stakes, Keeneland Race Course, Lexington, Kentucky

Former:

- United Kingdom: Queen's Young Leader Award

== Geographic locations ==
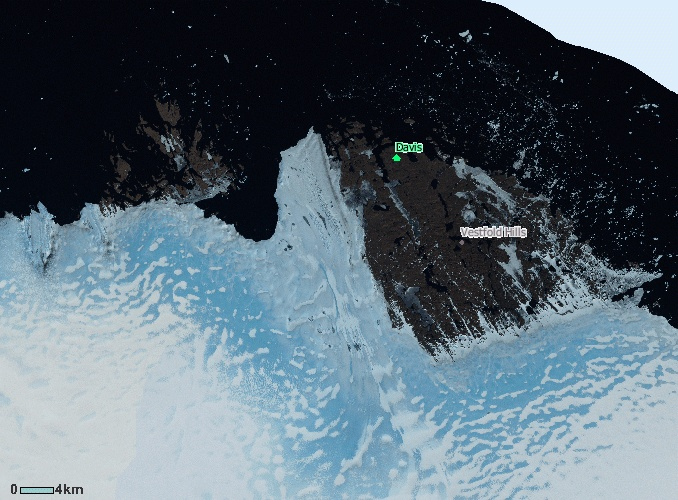
Princess Elizabeth Land, Australian Antarctic Territory

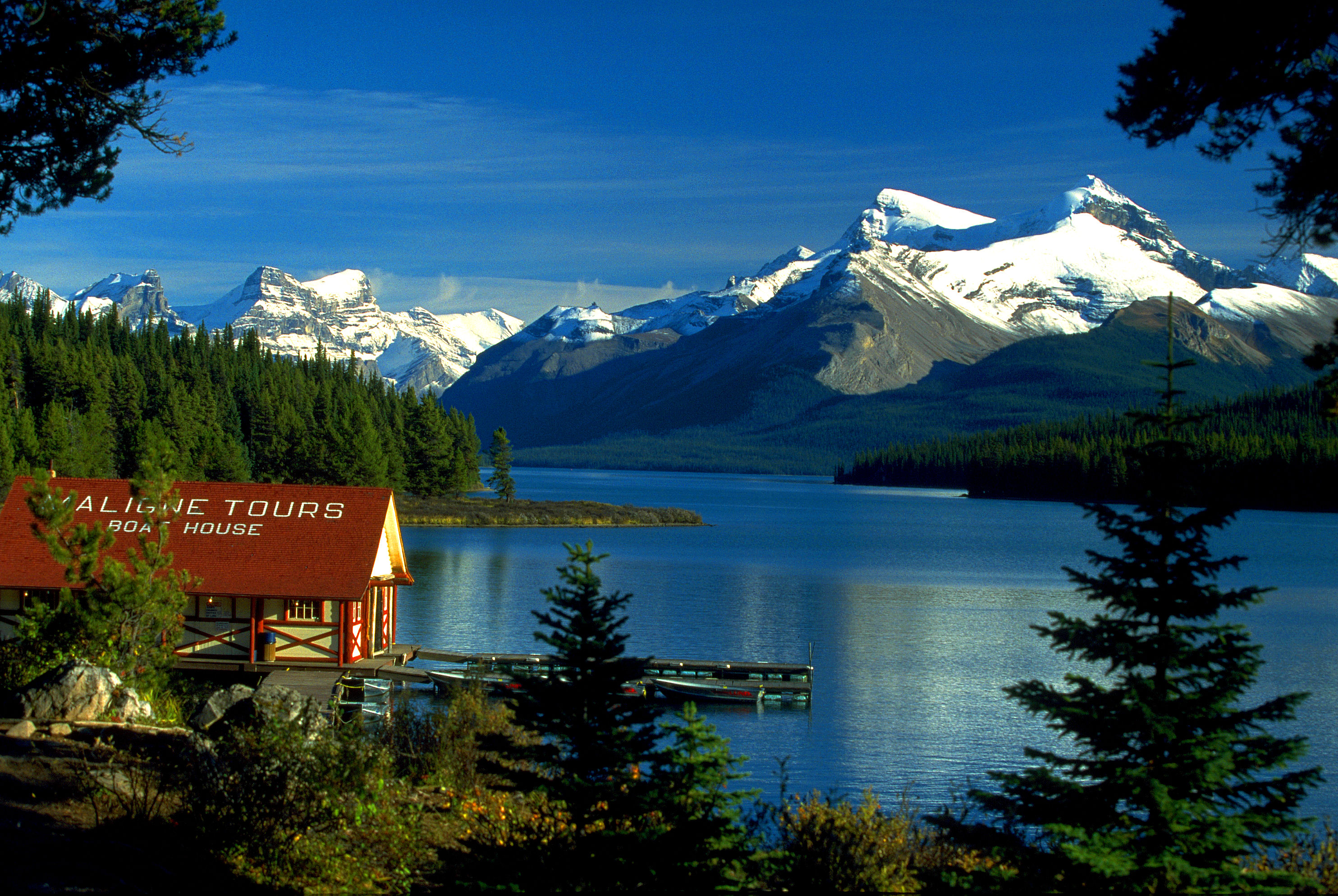
The Queen Elizabeth Ranges in the Canadian Rockies

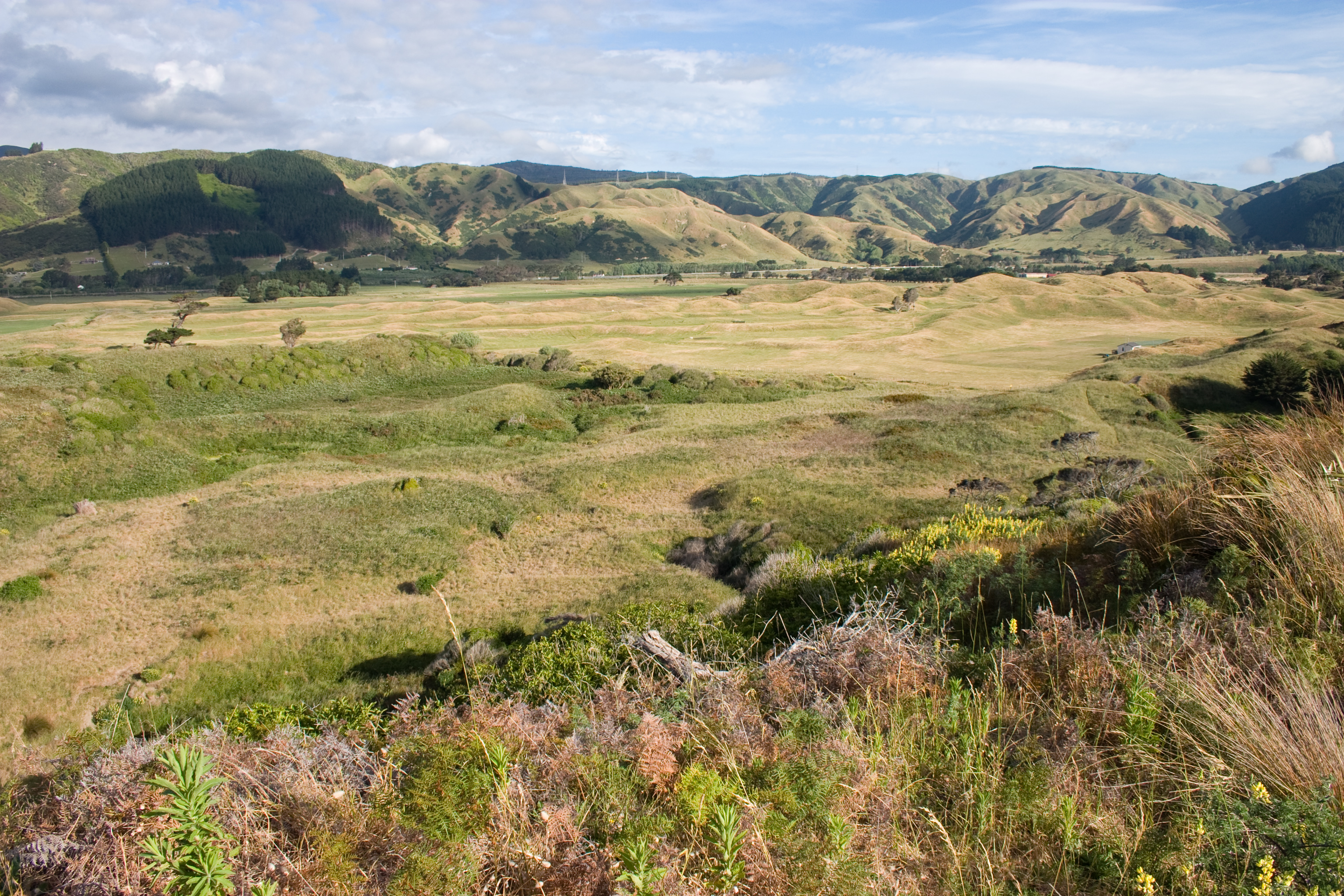
View of Queen Elizabeth Park, north of Wellington, New Zealand

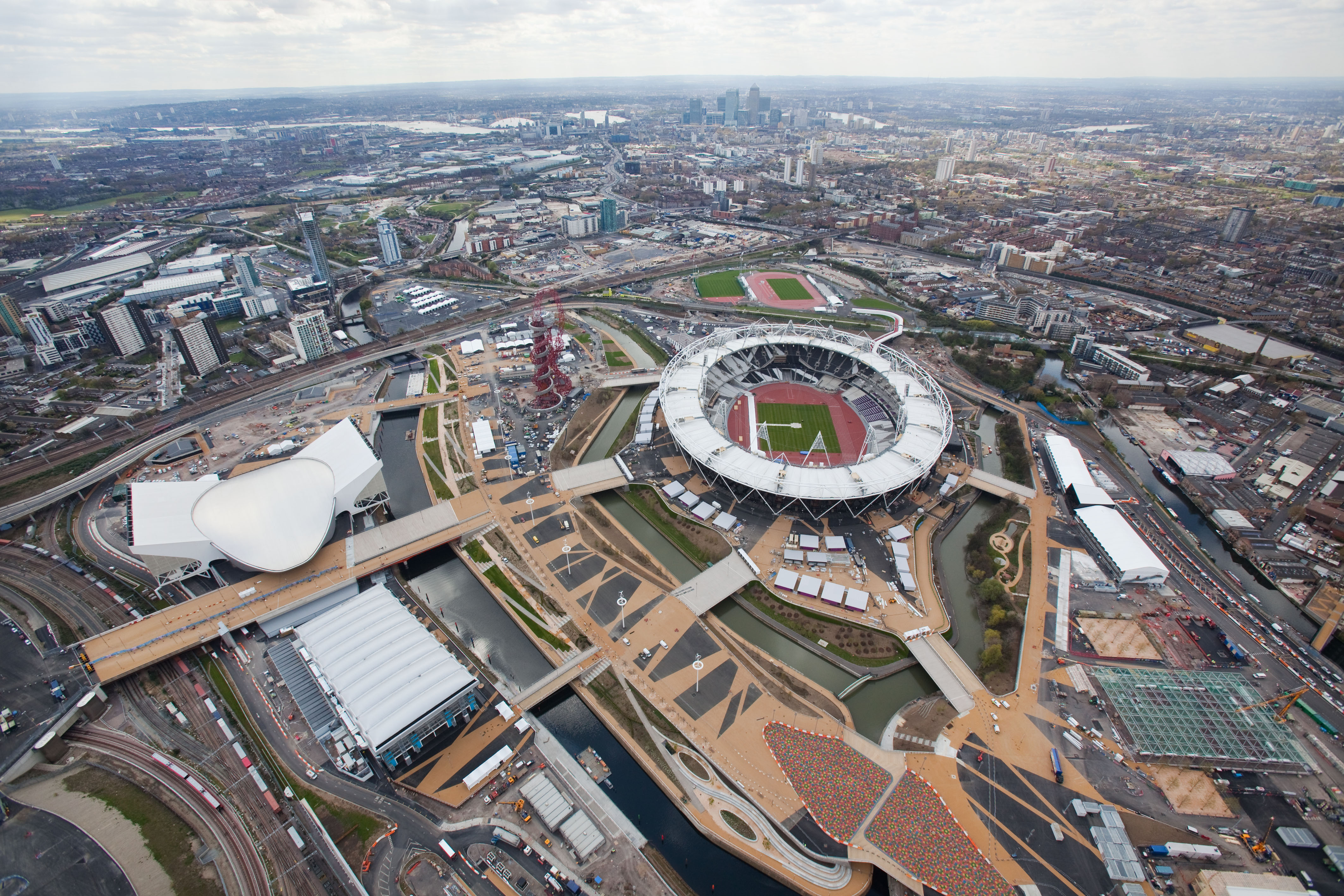
Queen Elizabeth Olympic Park in London, England

- Australia:
  - Australian Antarctic Territory: Princess Elizabeth Land, discovered on 9 February 1931, by the British Australian and New Zealand Antarctic Research Expedition and named after then Princess Elizabeth of York by Sir Douglas Mawson. It is home to Vostok Station (the coldest place on Earth)
  - Australian Capital Territory: Queen Elizabeth II Island, an artificial island located within Lake Burley Griffin, in Canberra
  - New South Wales: Queen Elizabeth Park, Concord, New South Wales.
  - New South Wales: Queen Elizabeth Lookout, Echo Point (lookout), Katoomba, New South Wales.
  - New South Wales: Queen Elizabeth Reserve, Killara
  - New South Wales: Queen Elizabeth Square, Albury
  - Northern Territory: Princess Elizabeth Mine, an abandoned mine situated about 1260 km south-southeast of Darwin
  - Norfolk Island: Queen Elizabeth Lookout, Kingston
  - Queensland: Queen Elizabeth Mine, an abandoned beryllium mine about 1560 km west-northwest of Brisbane
  - Queensland: Queen Elizabeth II Park, a community park and commemorative garden in Lamb Street Murgon
  - South Australia: City of Elizabeth
  - Victoria: Lake Elizabeth, Forrest
  - Western Australia: Elizabeth Quay, Perth
- Belize: Queen Elizabeth II Park, Orange Walk Town, Orange Walk District
- Canada:
  - Alberta: Queen Elizabeth Provincial Park
  - Alberta: Queen Elizabeth Ranges
  - Alberta: Coronation Park, Edmonton
  - British Columbia: Queen Elizabeth Park, Vancouver
  - British Columbia: Queen Elizabeth Ranges
  - Manitoba: Queen Elizabeth II Gardens, Winnipeg
  - New Brunswick: Coronation Park, Bathurst, New Brunswick
  - New Brunswick: Queen Elizabeth II Park, Miramichi, New Brunswick
  - Newfoundland and Labrador: Port Elizabeth
  - Northwest Territories: Queen Elizabeth Islands
  - Nova Scotia: Queen Elizabeth Park, Glace Bay
  - Nunavut: Queen Elizabeth Islands
  - Ontario: Golden Jubilee Greenway, Markham
  - Ontario: Golden Jubilee Park, Haliburton
  - Ontario: Golden Jubilee Park, Hamilton
  - Ontario: Queen Elizabeth II Gardens, Upper Canada Village, South Dundas, Ontario
  - Ontario: Queen Elizabeth II Gardens, Jackson Park (Windsor, Ontario)
  - Ontario: Queen Elizabeth II Rose Garden, Grange Park (Toronto)
  - Ontario: Queen Elizabeth II Rose Garden, Queen's Park, Toronto
  - Ontario: Queen Elizabeth II Wildlands Provincial Park
  - Ontario: The Queen Elizabeth II Diamond Jubilee Trail, Parliament Hill, Ottawa
  - Quebec: Queen Elizabeth II Park (French: Parc Reine Elizabeth II), La Pocatière
  - Quebec: Queen Elizabeth II Square (French: Place Reine Elizabeth II), Trois-Rivières
  - Saskatchewan: Queen Elizabeth Court, Regina
  - Saskatchewan: Queen's Golden Jubilee Rose Garden, Moose Jaw
  - Saskatchewan: The Queen Elizabeth II Gardens in front of the Saskatchewan Legislative Building, Regina
- Cayman Islands:
  - Queen Elizabeth II Botanic Park, Grand Cayman Island
- Chile:
  - Villa Reina Isabel II – Macul, Santiago, Santiago Province
- France: Marché aux fleurs Reine-Elizabeth-II, Paris
- Jersey:
  - Elizabeth Marina, a wet marina on the north-west side of St. Helier harbour
- New Zealand:
  - Auckland: Queen Elizabeth II Square, Auckland
  - Ross Dependency: Queen Elizabeth Range
  - Wellington: Queen Elizabeth Park
  - Queen Elizabeth II Platinum Jubilee Path
- Saint Vincent and the Grenadines:
  - Port Elizabeth, Saint Vincent and the Grenadines
- Singapore:
  - Queenstown, Singapore
- Solomon Islands: Queen Elizabeth National Park, Honiara The park was established on the occasion of the coronation of Queen Elizabeth II in 1953
- South Africa:
  - Queensburgh, its original name was Malvern, but it was changed in 1953 to celebrate Queen Elizabeth II's coronation
- Uganda:
  - Queen Elizabeth National Park
- United Kingdom:
  - British Antarctic Territory: Queen Elizabeth Land
  - England: Queen Elizabeth Country Park
  - England: Queen Elizabeth II Jubilee Country Park, Ashington, Northumberland
  - England: Queen's Gardens, Croydon
  - England: Queen Elizabeth II Garden, Regent’s Park, City of Westminster
  - England: Queen Elizabeth Diamond Jubilee Wood, Normanton le Heath, Leicestershire
  - England: Queen Elizabeth Olympic Park, East London
  - England: Queen Elizabeth Square, York
  - England: Queens Sports Centre, Godalming, (Charterhouse School)
  - Scotland: Queen Elizabeth Forest Park Trossachs
- United States of America:
  - Illinois: Queen's Landing, Chicago The place got its name in July 1959 when Queen Elizabeth II and Prince Philip sailed up the newly opened St. Lawrence Seaway and stopped in Chicago aboard the Royal Yacht Britannia
  - New York: Queen Elizabeth II September 11th Garden, New York City The Queen Elizabeth II September 11 Garden in Lower Manhattan's Hanover Square commemorates the enduring friendship and unity between the Commonwealth and the United States and its people
- Zimbabwe: Princess Elizabeth Island, Zambezi River

Former:

- Guyana: Queen Elizabeth II National Park
- Scotland: Queen Elizabeth Square, Glasgow

== Structures ==
=== Buildings ===
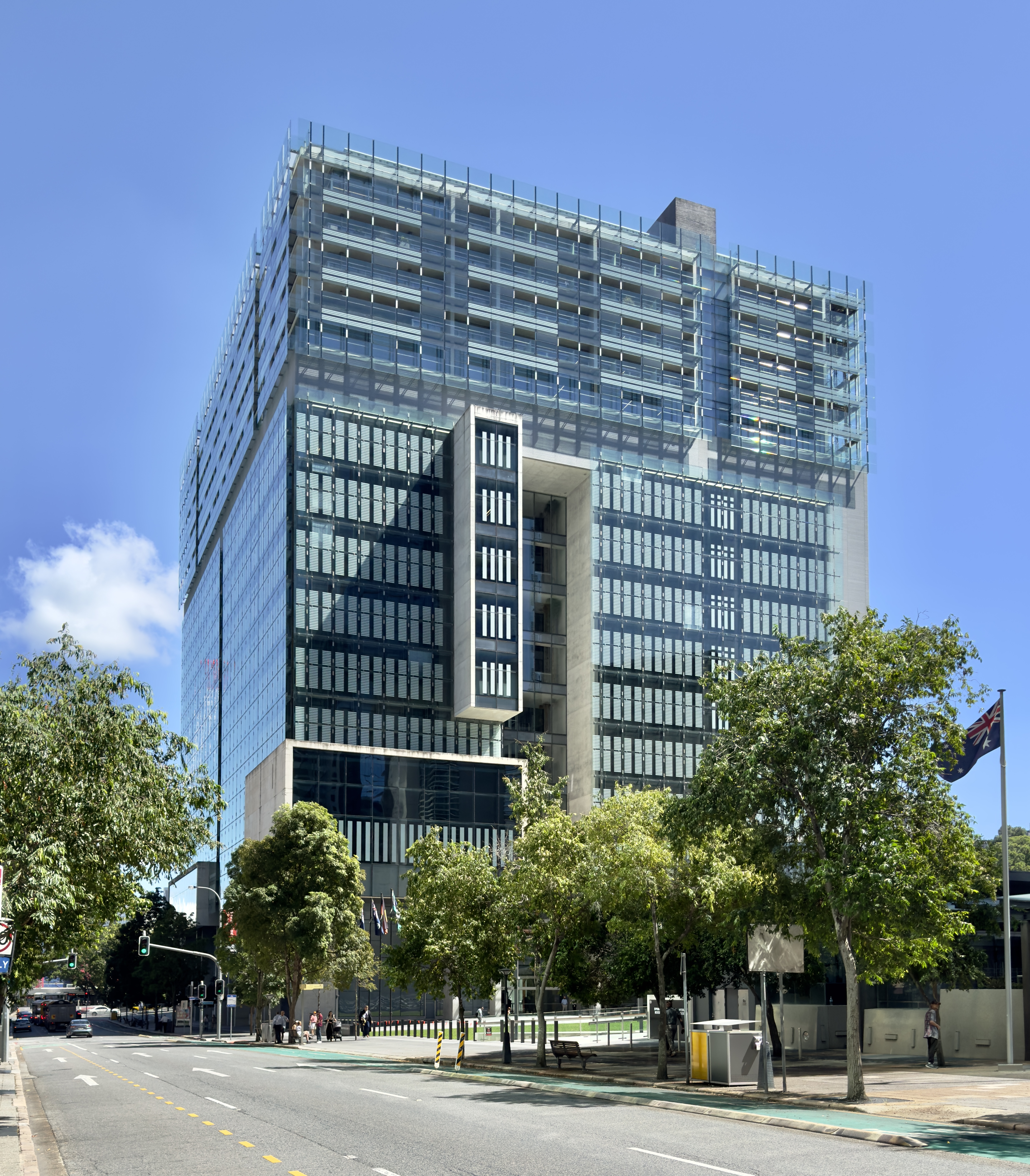
The Queen Elizabeth II Courts of Law, in Brisbane, Queensland

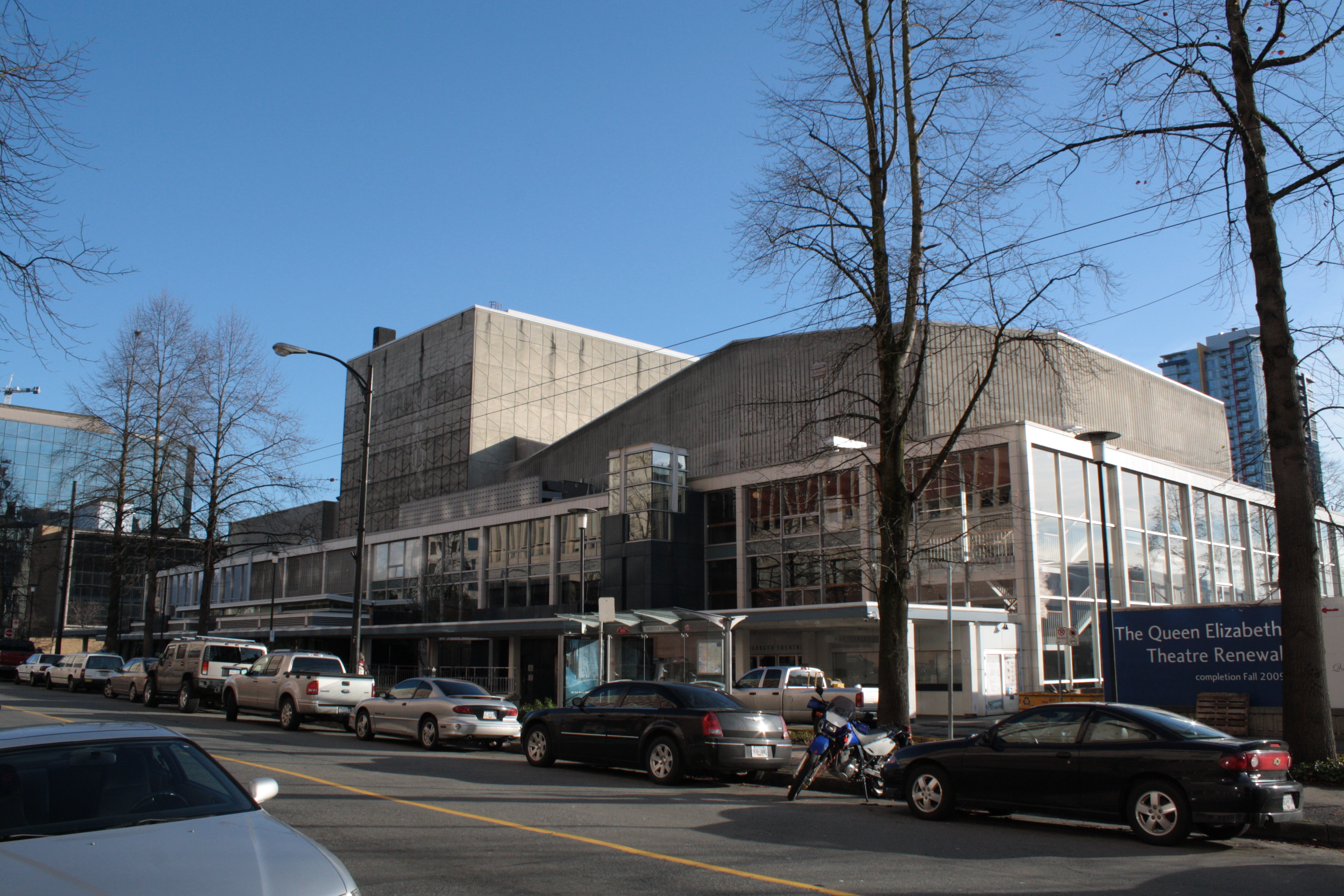
The Queen Elizabeth Theatre, in Vancouver, British Columbia.

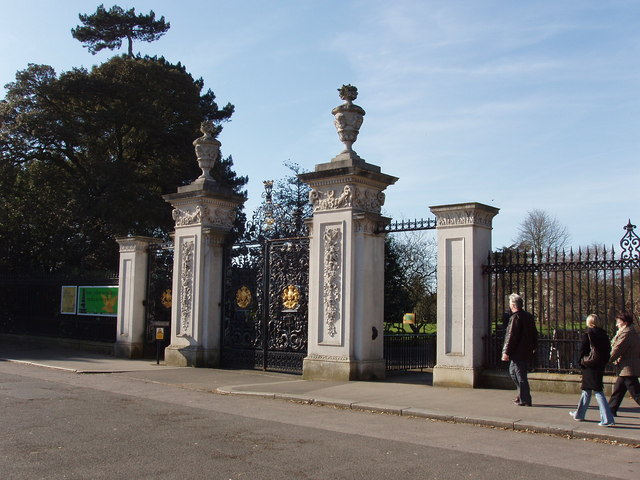
Elizabeth Gate, an entrance into Kew Gardens

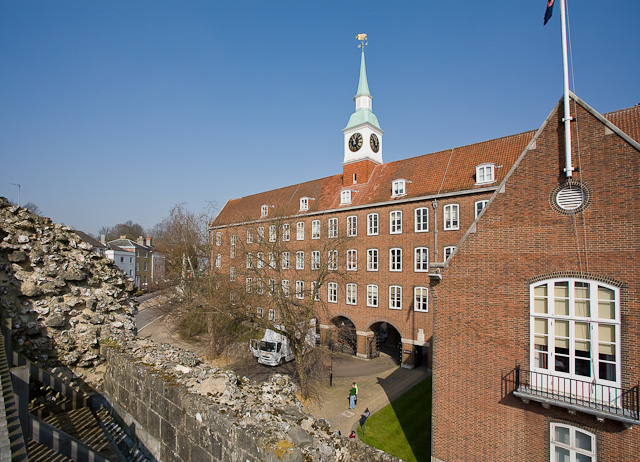
Queen Elizabeth II Court in Winchester, England

- Australia:
  - New South Wales: Queen Elizabeth II Grandstand, Randwick Racecourse, Sydney
  - Queensland: Queen Elizabeth II Courts of Law, Brisbane
  - Victoria: Queen Elizabeth Centre, Ballarat
- Bahamas: Queen Elizabeth Sports Centre, Nassau, Bahamas
- Canada:
  - Alberta: Queen Elizabeth II Building, Edmonton
  - Alberta: Queen Elizabeth II Planetarium, Edmonton
  - British Columbia: Queen Elizabeth Theatre, Vancouver
  - Manitoba: Queen Elizabeth II Music Building, Brandon University, Brandon
  - Newfoundland and Labrador: Queen Elizabeth II Library, Memorial University of Newfoundland, St. John's, Newfoundland
  - Ontario: Queen Elizabeth Building, Exhibition Place, Toronto
  - Quebec: Queen Elizabeth Hotel, Montreal
  - Saskatchewan: Queen Elizabeth Power Station, Regina
  - Saskatchewan: Queen Elizabeth II Court, Regina
- Fiji: Queen Elizabeth Barracks, Nabua
- Ghana: Queen Elizabeth II Hall, Kwame Nkrumah University of Science & Technology (KNUST), Kumasi
- Hong Kong: Queen Elizabeth Stadium
- New Zealand: Queen Elizabeth II Park, Christchurch
- New Zealand: Queen Elizabeth Youth Centre & Memorial Hall, Tauranga
- Nigeria: Queen Elizabeth II Hall University of Ibadan, Ibadan
- Sierra Leone: Queen Elizabeth II Quay Freetown, Sierra Leone
- South Africa: Princess Elizabeth Graving Dock, East London, Eastern Cape
- Trinidad and Tobago:
  - Princess Elizabeth Centre, Woodbrook, Port of Spain
  - Queen's Hall, St Ann's, Port of Spain
- United Kingdom:
  - England: Elizabeth Tower, Palace of Westminster, London (formerly the Clock Tower housing Big Ben)
  - England: The Queen's Terminal, London Heathrow (also known as Terminal 2)
  - England: Queen's Theatre, Hornchurch, London
  - England: Queen Elizabeth II Law Courts, Liverpool
  - England: Queen Elizabeth II Conference Centre, London
  - England: Queen Elizabeth II Great Court, London
  - England: Queen Elizabeth Hall, London
  - England: Queen's Gallery, Buckingham Palace, London (known since 2024 as The King's Gallery)
  - England: Queen Elizabeth II Dock, Eastham, Merseyside
  - England: Queen Elizabeth II Reservoir, Molesey, Surrey
  - England: Queen Elizabeth II Hall, Oldham
  - England: Queen's Building, University of Bristol, Bristol
  - England: Queen Elizabeth II Court, Winchester, part of the HQ of Hampshire County Council
  - England: Elizabeth Gate, the main entrance into Kew Gardens, London (formerly the Main Gate)
  - England: Sapphire Jubilee Community Centre, Collier Row, Romford
  - England: The Queen Elizabeth II Diamond Jubilee Leisure Centre, Leicester
  - England: The Queen Elizabeth II Diamond Jubilee Pavilion Café, Queen's Park, Bolton
  - England: Queen Elizabeth II Cruise Terminal, Port of Southampton, Southampton
  - Jersey: Elizabeth Harbour and Terminal, Saint Helier
  - Scotland: Queen's Gallery, Edinburgh

Former:

- Hong Kong: Queen Elizabeth II Youth Centre
- New Zealand: QEII Army Memorial Museum, Waiouru
- United Kingdom: Queens Building, Heathrow Airport (built in 1953 and demolished in 2009)
- Queensland: Queen Elizabeth II Jubilee Sports Centre, Brisbane
- England: QEII Pier, London

=== Hospitals and health ===
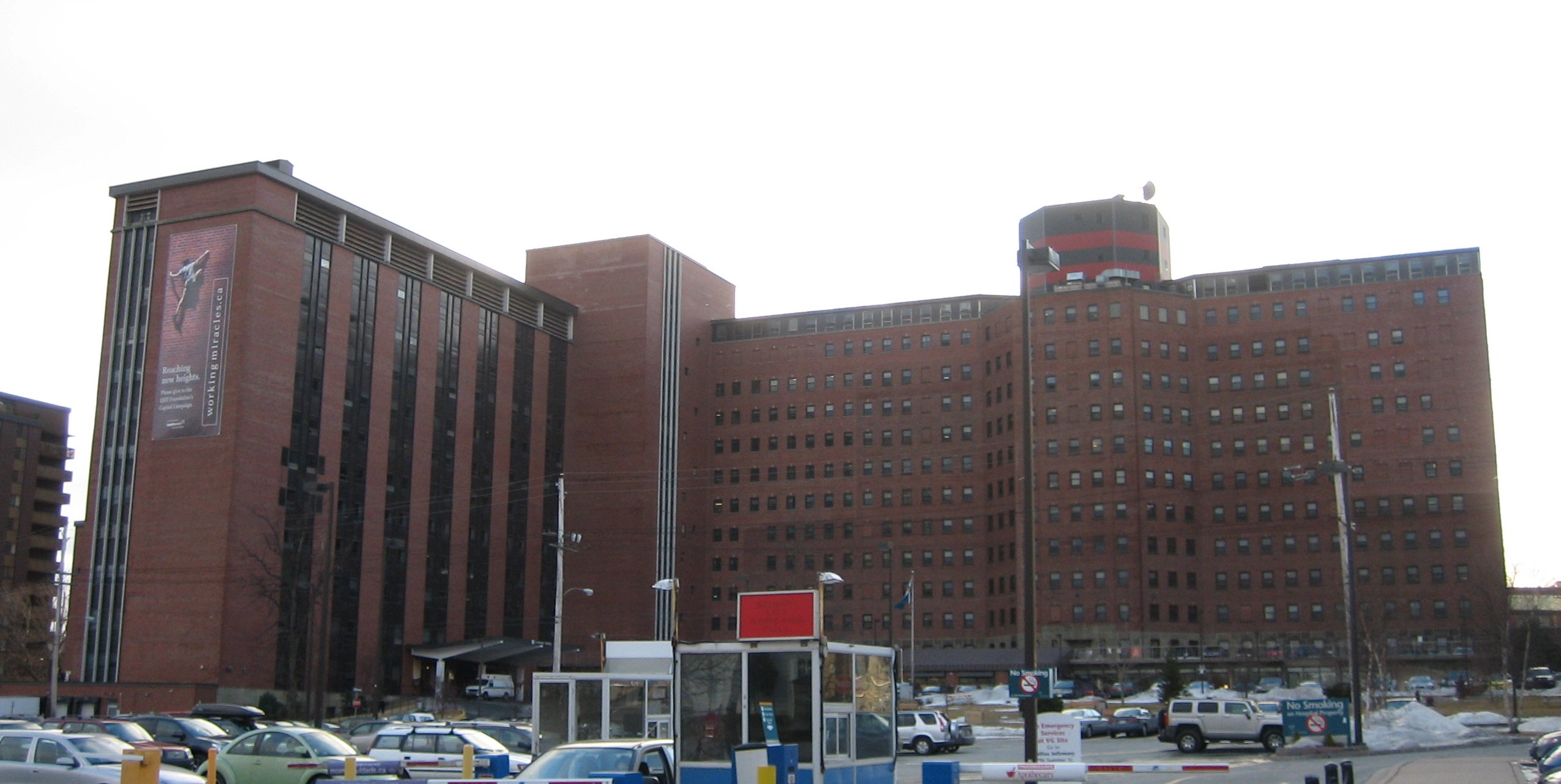
The Queen Elizabeth II Health Sciences Centre, in Halifax, Nova Scotia

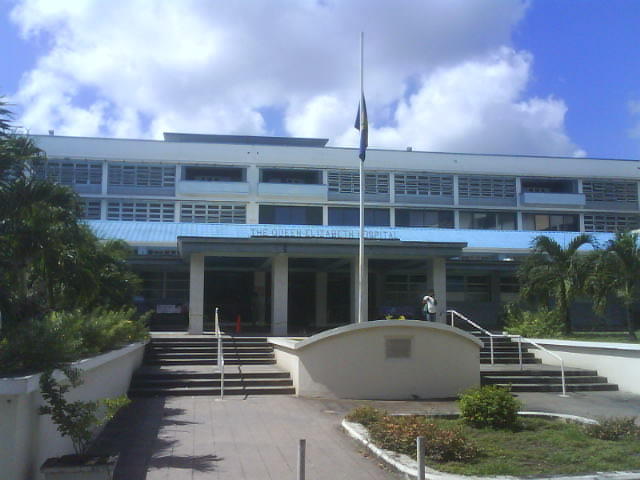
The Queen Elizabeth Hospital, in Bridgetown, Barbados

- Australia:
  - New South Wales: Queen Elizabeth II Rehabilitation Centre, Camperdown, New South Wales
  - South Australia: Queen Elizabeth Hospital, Adelaide
  - Queensland: Queen Elizabeth II Jubilee Hospital, Brisbane
  - Western Australia: Queen Elizabeth II Medical Centre, Nedlands, Western Australia
- Barbados: Queen Elizabeth Hospital, Bridgetown
- Canada:
  - Alberta: Queen Elizabeth II Hospital, Grande Prairie
  - Manitoba: Princess Elizabeth Hospital, Winnipeg
  - Nova Scotia: Queen Elizabeth II Health Sciences Centre, Halifax
  - Ontario: Princess Elizabeth Wing, Soldiers' Memorial Hospital, Orillia
  - Ontario: Toronto Rehabilitation Hospital – Queen Elizabeth Centre
  - Prince Edward Island: Queen Elizabeth Hospital, Charlottetown
  - Quebec: Queen Elizabeth Hospital, Montreal
- Chile: Centro de Salud Familiar Reina Isabel II, Valparaíso
- Grenada: Queen Elizabeth Home for Children, Saint George's
- Guernsey: The Princess Elizabeth Hospital, Guernsey
- Hong Kong: Queen Elizabeth Hospital, Hong Kong
- Lesotho: Queen Elizabeth II Hospital, Maseru
- Malaysia: Queen Elizabeth Hospital, Kota Kinabalu
- Malawi: Queen Elizabeth Central Hospital, Blantyre
- Mauritius: Queen Elizabeth Hospital, Rodrigues Island
- Singapore: Mount Elizabeth Hospital, Mount Elizabeth Orchard Road
- United Kingdom:
  - England: Golden Jubilee Wing, King's College Hospital
  - England: Princess Elizabeth Orthopaedic Centre, Exeter
  - England: New QEII Hospital, Welwyn Garden City
  - England: Queen's Medical Centre, Nottingham
  - England: Queen Elizabeth Hospital Birmingham, Birmingham
  - Scotland: Queen Elizabeth University Hospital, Glasgow

=== Monuments and sculptures ===
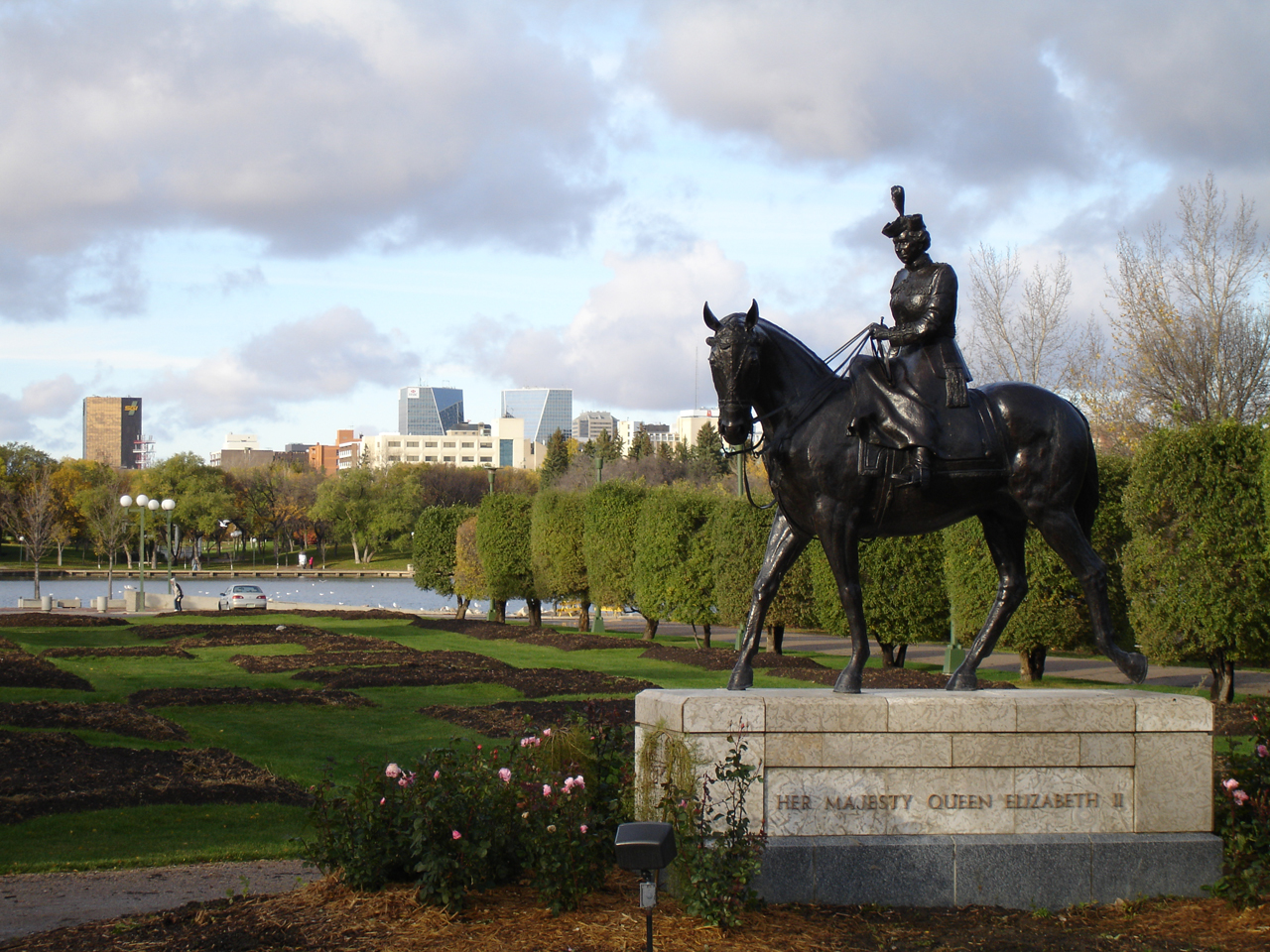
Equestrian statue of the Queen on the grounds of the Saskatchewan Legislative Building

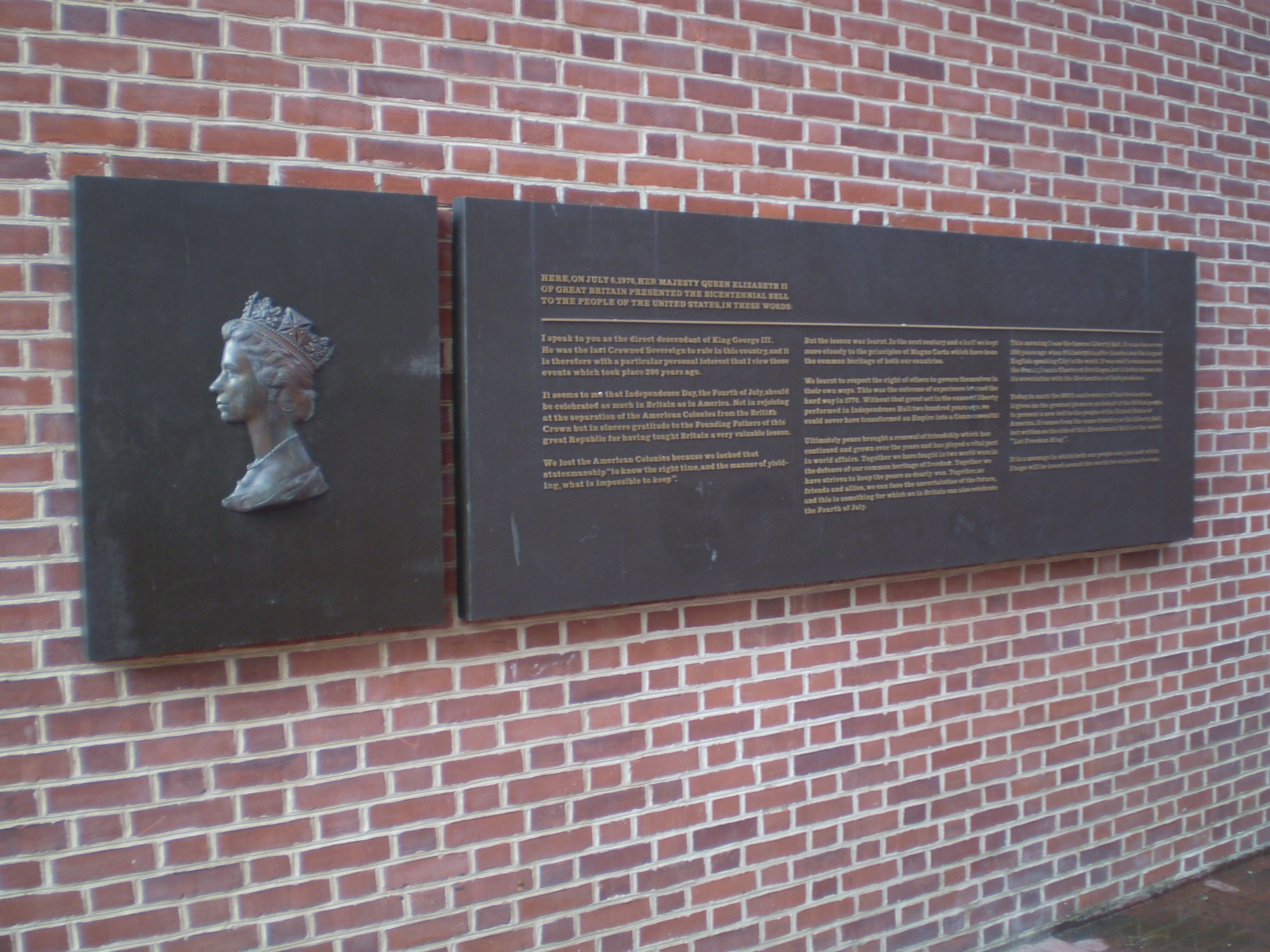
Queen speech Bicentennial Bell

- Australia:
  - Australian Capital Territory: statue, Parliament House, Canberra
  - Queensland: statue of Queen Elizabeth II holding a handbag, Spring Hill, Brisbane
  - South Australia: statue by sculptor Robert Hannaford at Government House in Adelaide
- Canada:
  - Manitoba: Statue, Government House, Winnipeg commemorating the Queen's address to the Legislative Assembly of Manitoba during its provincial centennial in 1970
  - Ontario: Statue, Parliament Hill, Ottawa
  - Saskatchewan: Statue of Queen Elizabeth II on her horse Burmese in front of Saskatchewan Legislative Building, Regina
- Nigeria:
  - Bronze statue that once stood in front of the Nigerian Parliament building depicting the Queen sitting on the throne by Ben Enwonwu, 1956. It was removed after Nigeria became a republic and now stands at the Deputy High Commissioner's Residence in Lagos
- Papua New Guinea:
  - Portrait bust of a young crowned Queen Elizabeth II, Port Moresby
- United Kingdom:
  - England: bronze bust by Frances Segelman erected at the Bexleyheath Clock Tower, Bexleyheath, Bexley, London, to commemorate the 60th anniversary of the queen's coronation
  - England: bronze bust at the Honourable Artillery Company, London
  - England: bronze cast in the Great Hall of Winchester Castle, Winchester, Hampshire
  - England: bronze statue amongst many others, including of Prince Philip's in a sculpture known as "Uniting Two Societies" on the grounds of Ascot Racecourse, Windsor
  - England: head sculpture on the left side of entrance to Chichester Cathedral, West Sussex
  - England: statue in the Garter robes, Canterbury Cathedral, Canterbury
  - England: equestrian statue, Windsor Great Park, Windsor
  - England: statue of the Queen in the Order of the Garter robes, Runnymede, Surrey, to mark the 800th anniversary of the sealing of Magna Carta
  - England: statue depicting her alongside a mare and its foal in 1977, Newmarket, to honour her 90th birthday
  - England: statue of the Queen in the Order of the Garter robes sitting in a chair in St Andrew's Gardens, Gravesend, Kent
  - England: plaque with relief portrait at Old Town Hall, Richmond, London
  - England: statue by Lydia Karpinska named "The Windsor Lady" - An informal representation of Elizabeth II wearing a head scarf and sitting down on a small bench atop a four-step brick built plinth. She is surrounded by her corgis, Bachelors Acre Park, Windsor
  - England: statue by Caroline Wallace, designed to celebrate the links between the Queen and the Army. It depicts the Queen at Trooping the Colour in 1984 wearing the Grenadier Guards uniform and riding her horse Burmese for the last time, at Royal Military Academy Sandhurst, Sandhurst, Berkshire
  - England: French limestone statue by Richard Bossons showing the Queen in robes of the Order of the Garter. It is installed above the West Front entrance of York Minster, the largest gothic cathedral in Britain, and pays tribute to the late monarch's life of service and dedication, York
- United States:
  - Pennsylvania: high relief portrait with Dedication Speech on the Bicentennial Bell Memorial Wall, Philadelphia. The Bicentennial Bell was a gift from the people of Britain presented by the Queen to the people of the United States to celebrate the 1976 United States Bicentennial

Former:

- Canada: British Columbia: bust in Beacon Hill Park, Victoria, commemorating the royal visit of 1959 had its head completely removed from the body by vandals in February 2021

=== Roads, highways, bridges and footpaths ===
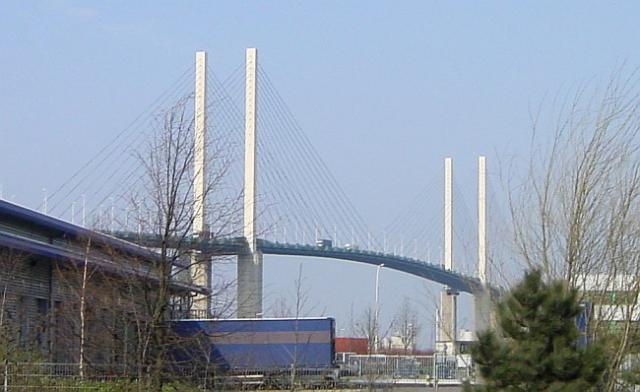
The Queen Elizabeth II Bridge, between Thurrock and Dartford, England

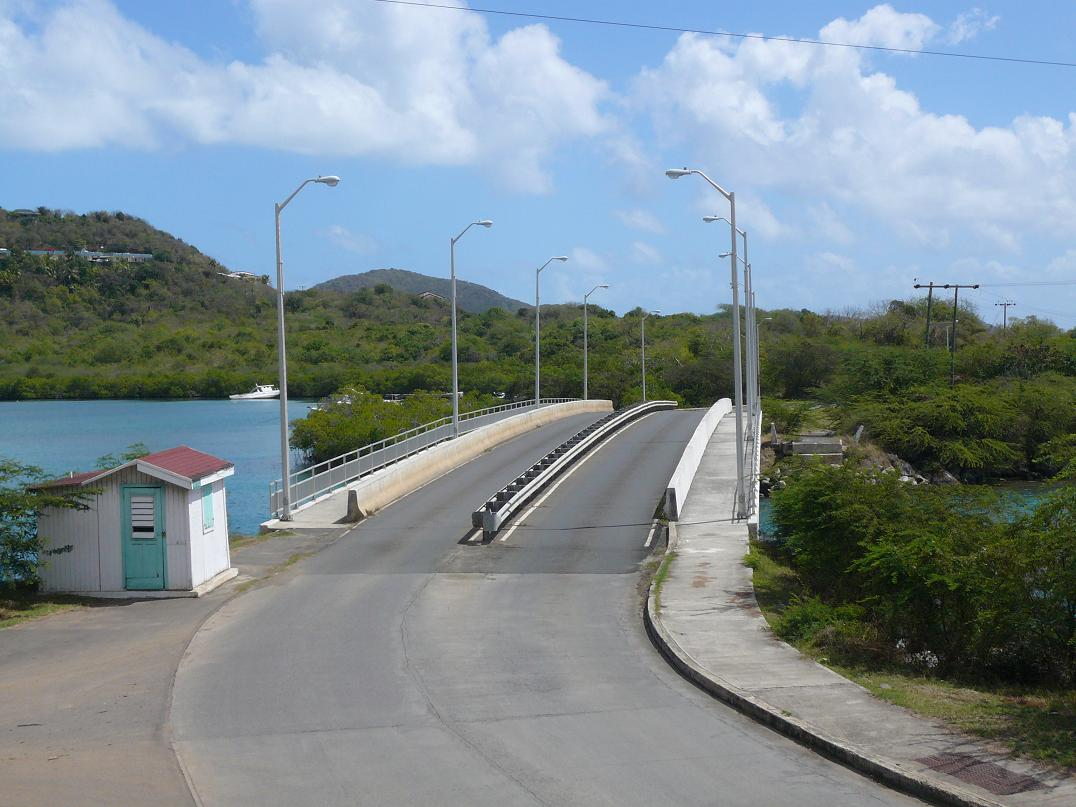
The Queen Elizabeth II Bridge, British Virgin Islands

- Alderney: Queen Elizabeth II Street
- Australia:
  - Australian Capital Territory: Queen Elizabeth Terrace, Parkes, Canberra
  - New South Wales: Queen Elizabeth Drive, Armidale
  - Norfolk Island: Queen Elizabeth Avenue
  - Victoria: Queen Street and Elizabeth Street (adjacent streets), Hamilton
- Bahamas: Queen Elizabeth Drive, Marsh Harbour, Abaco Islands
- Brazil:
  - Amazonas: Queen Elizabeth Way (Portuguese: Rua Rainha Elizabeth), Manaus
- British Virgin Islands: Queen Elizabeth II Bridge, between Beef Island and Tortola
- Brunei: Elizabeth II Street (Malay: Jalan Elizabeth Dua), Bandar Seri Begawan
- Canada:
  - Alberta: Princess Elizabeth Avenue, Edmonton
  - Alberta: Queen Elizabeth II Highway, the portion of Alberta Highway 2 between Calgary and Edmonton
  - Manitoba: Queen Elizabeth Avenue, Erickson
  - Manitoba: Queen Elizabeth Way, Winnipeg, in commemoration of the 2002 royal visit.
  - Ontario: Queen Elizabeth Driveway, Ottawa
  - Ontario: Queensway, Highway 417, Ottawa
  - Ontario: Queen Elizabeth Street, Lively (Greater Sudbury)
  - Quebec: Rue Élisabeth-II in Quebec City.
- Cayman Islands Queens Highway, East End, Grand Cayman Islands
- Ethiopia: Queen Elizabeth II Street, Addis Ababa, to commemorate the Queen's visit in 1965
- Fiji: Queen Elizabeth Drive
- Ghana: Elizabeth II Street, Prestea, Ocidental
- Jersey: L’Avenue de la Reine Elizabeth II
- Malaysia:
  - Perak: Queen's Street (Malay: Jalan Queen), Ipoh
  - Sabah: Queen Elizabeth Street (Malay: Jalan Queen Elizabeth), Kota Kinabalu
- Malta: (Maltese: Triq il-Prinċipessa Eliżabetta – Princess Elizabeth Street), Ta' Xbiex
- Mauritius: Queen Elizabeth II Avenue, Port Louis, Mauritius
- New Zealand: Queen Elizabeth II Drive, State Highway 74, Christchurch
- Nigeria:
  - Queen Elizabeth II Road, Ibadan
  - Queen Elizabeth Street, Abuja
- Poland: Queen Elizabeth Street (Polish: Ulica Królowej Elżbiety), Łańcut, Subcarpathian Voivodeship
- Singapore: Queen Elizabeth II Walk, Singapore, to commemorate the Queen's coronation in 1953
- Sri Lanka:
  - Central Province: Queen Elizabeth Drive, Nuwara Eliya
  - North Central Province: Queen Elizabeth II Street (Jaya Mawatha), Thambuththegama, to commemorate the Queen's visit in 1981
- Uganda: Queen's Way (Central Division, Kampala City) to commemorate the Queen's visit
- Ukraine: Queen Elizabeth Street (Ukrainian: Вулиця Королеви Єлизавети – Vulitsya Korolevy Yelyzavety), Mukachevo, Zakarpattia Oblast
- United Kingdom:
  - England: Diamond Jubilee Way, Carshalton, London. Formerly part of Fountain Drive, redeveloped and renamed for her Diamond Jubilee
  - England: Diamond Jubilee Way, Edlington, South Yorkshire
  - England: Diamond Jubilee Way, Wokingham, Berkshire
  - England: Golden Jubilee Bridge, London
  - England: Princess Elizabeth Way, Cheltenham, Gloucestershire
  - England: Queen Elizabeth II Bridge, part of the Dartford Crossing between Thurrock and Dartford
  - England: Queen Elizabeth Road, Nuneaton, main boundary road for Camp Hill adjoining to Tuttle Hill and Bucks Hill
  - England: Queen Elizabeth Bridge, A322 Windsor By-pass, Windsor
  - England: Queen Elizabeth II Metro Bridge, Tyne and Wear Metro, between Newcastle upon Tyne and Gateshead
  - England: Queen Elizabeth Walk, Barnes, London, to commemorate the Queen's coronation in 1953
  - England: Queen Elizabeth Way, Colchester
  - England: Queensway, Birmingham
  - England: Queensway, Stevenage
  - England: Queensway, Stoke-on-Trent
  - England: Elizabeth Avenue, Abingdon-on-Thames, Oxfordshire, one of several named during her Silver Jubilee
  - England: Elizabeth Avenue, Staines-upon-Thames, Surrey
  - England: Elizabeth Avenue, Stoke Hill, Exeter
  - England: Elizabeth II Avenue, Berkhamsted, Hertfordshire
  - England: Elizabeth Road, Purbrook, Hampshire
  - England: Elizabeth Road, Stamford, Lincolnshire
  - England: Elizabeth Way, Hilperton, Wiltshire
  - Northern Ireland: Queen Elizabeth Bridge, Belfast
  - Northern Ireland: Queen Elizabeth Bridge, Enniskillen, built in 1954, across the River Erne
  - Northern Ireland: Queen Elizabeth Road, Enniskillen, road which crosses the above bridge and runs alongside the Erne
- United States:
  - California: Queen Elizabeth Drive, Atwater
  - Texas: Queen Elizabeth Drive, Arlington
  - Washington, D.C.: Queen's Stroll, Ward 7

Former:

- Iran: Elizabeth II Boulevard (Persian: بلوار الیزابت دوم – Bolvār Elizābet Dovvom), Tehran, named to commemorate the Queen's visit in 1961, renamed Keshavarz Boulevard (Persian: بلوار کشاورز – Bolvār e Keshāvarz) in 1979.

=== Schools ===
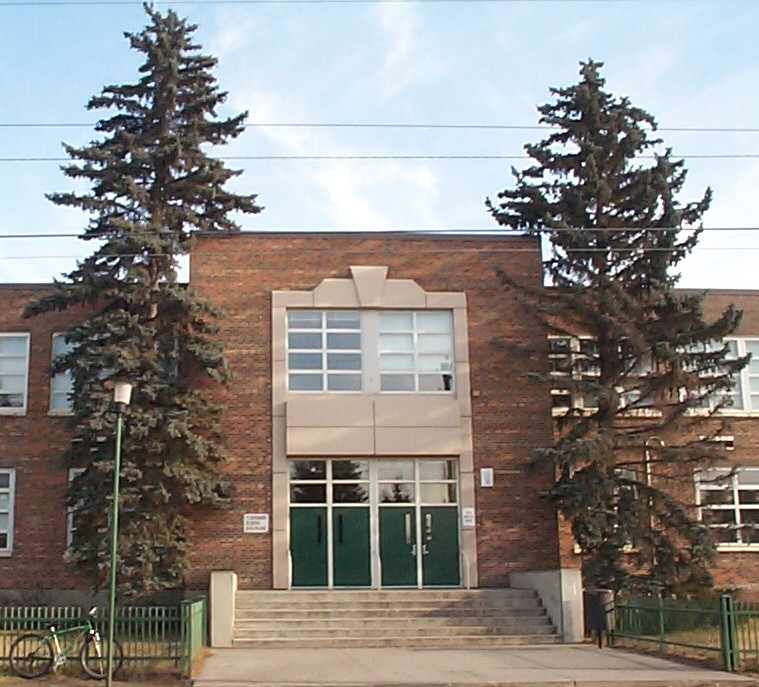
Queen Elizabeth High School in Calgary, Alberta

- Australia:
  - Victoria: Princess Elizabeth Junior School For Deaf Children Burwood, Victoria
- Canada:
  - Alberta: Queen Elizabeth High School, Calgary
  - Alberta: Queen Elizabeth High School, Edmonton
  - Manitoba: Princess Elizabeth High School, Shilo, Manitoba
  - New Brunswick: Princess Elizabeth School Saint John, New Brunswick
  - Newfoundland and Labrador: Queen Elizabeth Regional High School
  - Ontario: Princess Elizabeth School, Brantford
  - Ontario: Princess Elizabeth School, London
  - Ontario: Princess Elizabeth Senior Elementary School, Niagara Falls
  - Ontario: Princess Elizabeth School Orangeville
  - Ontario: Princess Elizabeth Public School, Welland
  - Ontario: Queen Elizabeth District High School, Sioux Lookout, Ontario
  - Ontario: Queen Elizabeth II School, Sarnia
  - Ontario: Queen Elizabeth II School, Chatham
  - Ontario: Queen Elizabeth Middle School, Mississauga
  - Ontario: Queen Elizabeth Public School (Trenton), Trenton
  - Ontario: Queen Elizabeth Public School, Oshawa
  - Ontario: Queen Elizabeth Public School, Ottawa
  - Quebec: École Primaire Princess Elizabeth, Magog, Quebec
  - Quebec: Princess Elizabeth High School, Magog, Quebec
- Hong Kong:
  - Queen Elizabeth School, Hong Kong
- Isle of Man:
  - Queen Elizabeth II High School, Peel, Isle of Man
- Jamaica:
  - The Queen's School, Kingston, Jamaica
- Malaysia:
  - Johor: Queen Elizabeth School for The Blind
  - Johor: SK Princess Elizabeth Primary School
- Mauritius:
  - Queen Elizabeth College, Mauritius
- Mexico:
  - Distrito Federal: Queen Elizabeth School, Mexico City
  - Mexico: Colegio Reina Elizabeth, Tlalnepantla
  - Querétaro: Colegio Reina Elizabeth, Santiago de Querétaro
  - Veracruz: Colegio Queen Elizabeth, Veracruz
- New Zealand:
  - Queen Elizabeth College, Palmerston North
- Nigeria:
  - Queen Elizabeth Secondary School, Ilorin
- Singapore:
  - Princess Elizabeth Primary School, Singapore
- Trinidad and Tobago:
  - Princess Elizabeth Special School, Port of Spain
- United Kingdom:
  - England: Queen Elizabeth House, University of Oxford, Oxfordshire
  - England: Queen Elizabeth College, University of London, London
  - England: Queen Elizabeth II Silver Jubilee School, West Sussex
  - Wales: Queen Elizabeth High School, Carmarthen
- Zimbabwe: Queen Elizabeth Girls High School, Harare

Former:

- United Kingdom (England): The Queen's Church of England Primary School, Kew, London, reverted to its previous name of The King's Church of England Primary School in 2023 after the Queen's death and her son's succession to the throne as King Charles III.

== Other ==
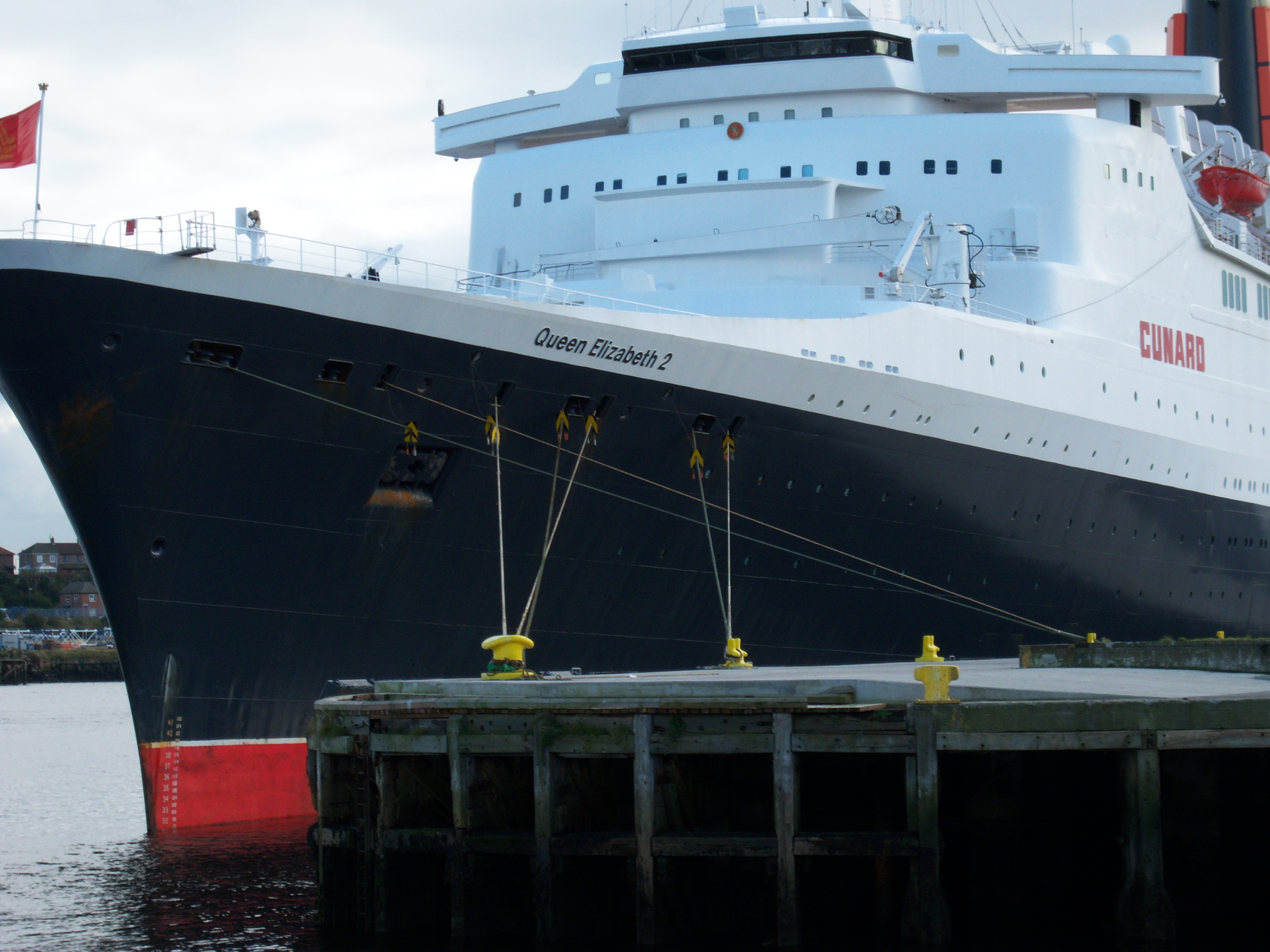
QE2 bow name, October 2008

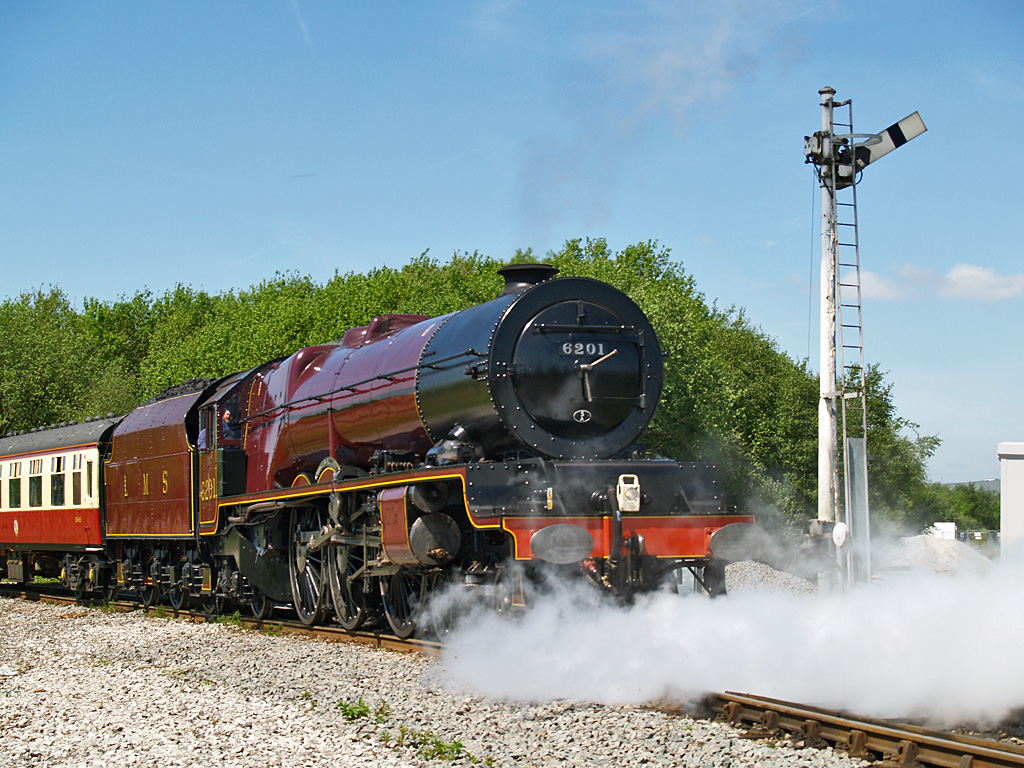
LMS Princess Royal Class 6201 Princess Elizabeth at Castleton East Junction

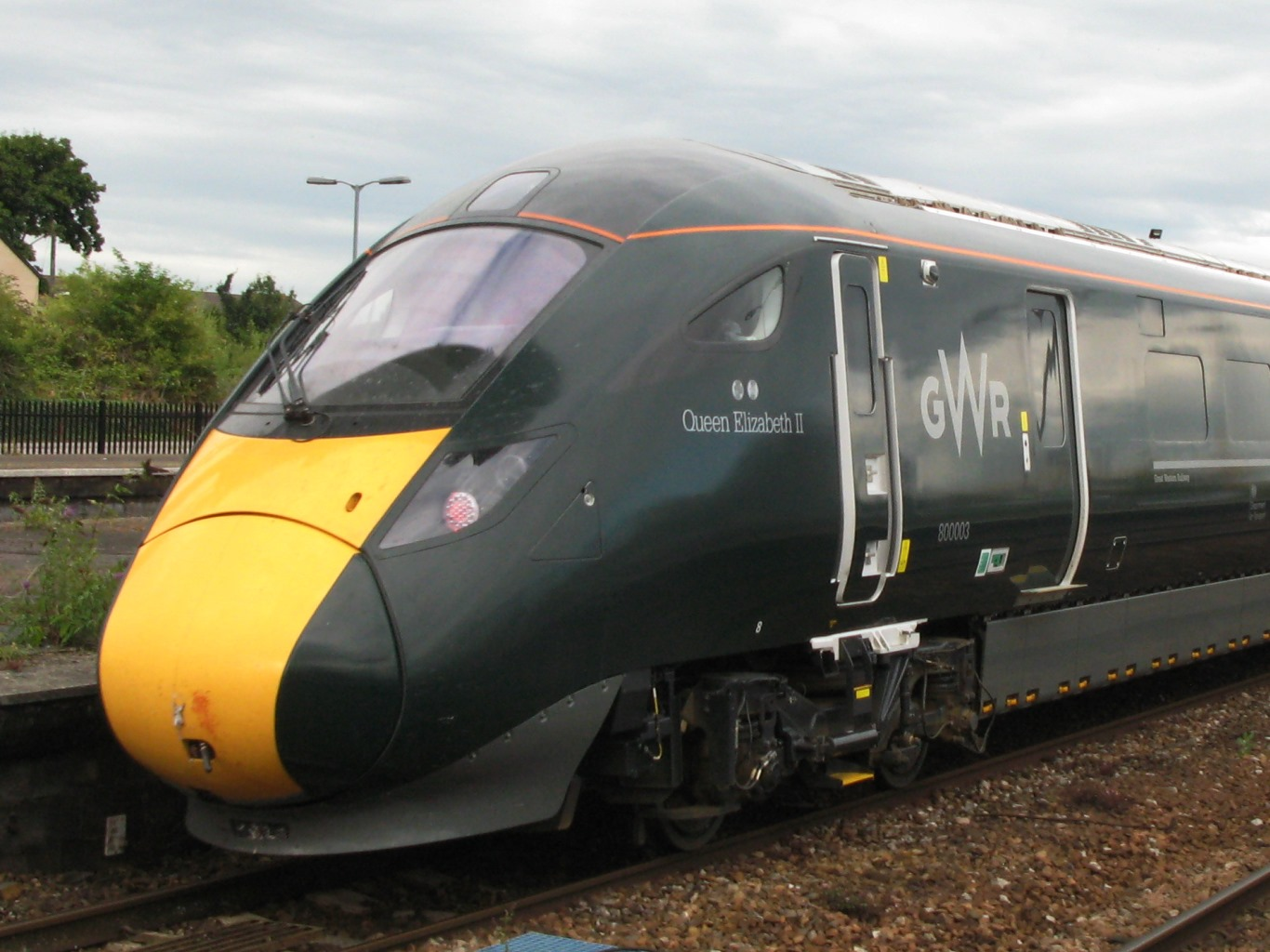
Class 800 800003 Queen Elizabeth II on test

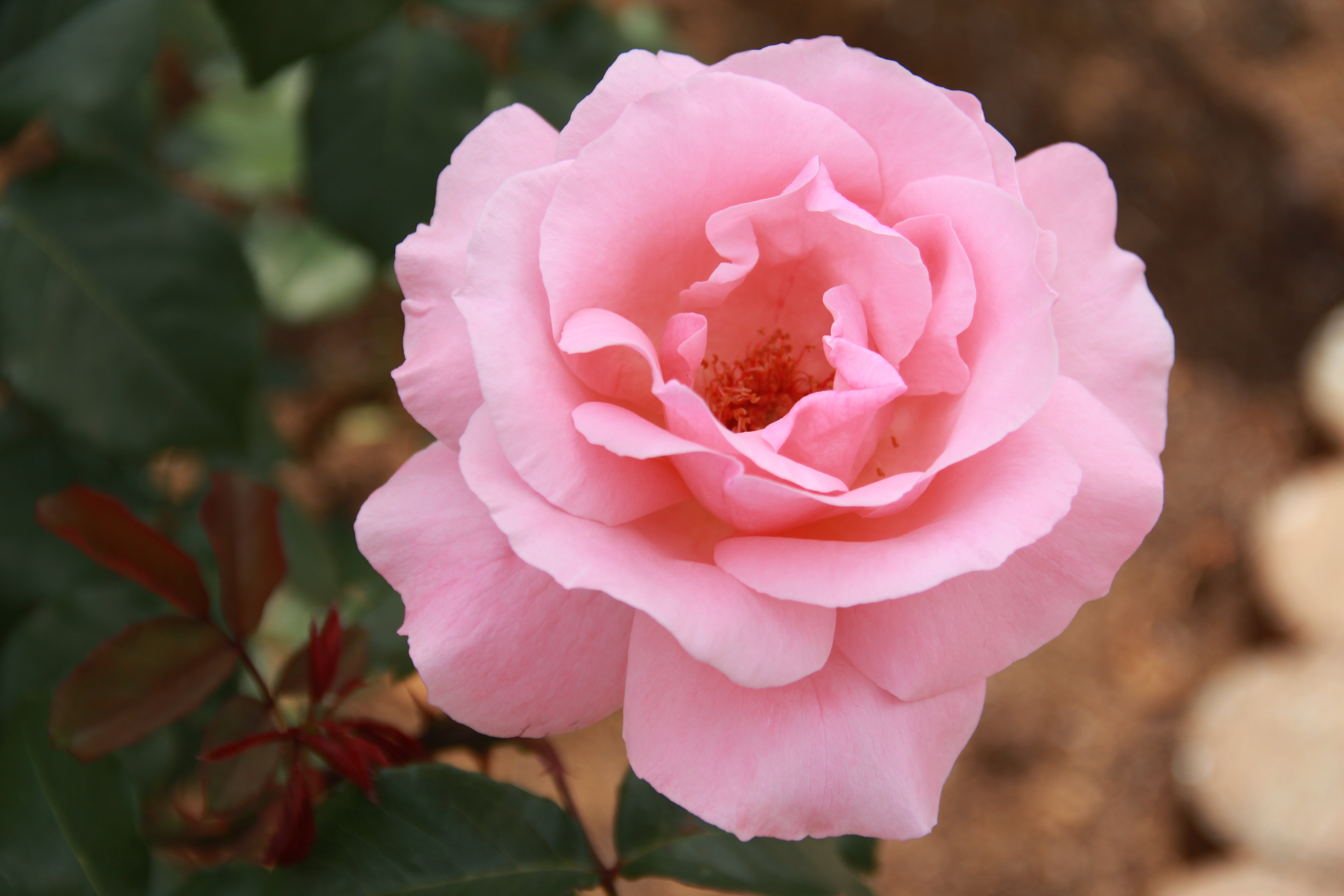
Queen Elizabeth II rose

- Australia:
  - Western Australia: Elizabeth Quay, Perth
- Canada:
  - Canadian Queen Elizabeth II Diamond Jubilee Scholarships: Also known as the Queen Elizabeth Scholars Program. Canada-based global education program led by the Rideau Hall Foundation, Universities Canada and the Community Foundations of Canada. By 2022, 3,000 QE Scholars were awarded
  - British Columbia: The proposed Queen Elizabeth II Observatory on Mount Kobau in British Columbia. Later renamed the Mount Kobau National Observatory, and the 3.81 m main telescope was named in her honour
  - Nova Scotia: Queen Elizabeth II Walkway at Halifax Public Gardens
  - Quebec: The Queen Elizabeth II Suite at the Fairmont le Chateau Frontenac, Quebec City
- Commonwealth of Nations
  - Queen's Baton Relay
- France:
  - Esplanade Élisabeth II, Biarritz
- New Zealand:
  - Taiora QEII Recreation and Sport Centre, Christchurch
- Sri Lanka:
  - Queen Elizabeth Quay, Colombo Harbour, Sri Lanka – to commemorate the Queen's visit in 1954
- United Kingdom:
  - LMS Princess Royal Class 6201 Princess Elizabeth, one of the LMS Princess Royal Class of steam locomotives
  - Railway carriage No 9188 Collett Super Saloon Princess Elizabeth, formerly used by the Great Western Railway and preserved at Didcot Railway Centre since 1976
  - Class 800 800003 Queen Elizabeth II
  - England: Coronation Capsule, one of the capsules on the London Eye, London
  - England: London Underground's Jubilee line
  - England: Crossrail's Elizabeth line
  - England: Queen Elizabeth II Centre at Thomas Coram Foundation for Children
  - England: South Bank Centre's Queen Elizabeth Hall Roof Garden, Lambeth, London
  - England: The Vintners' Bell "Elizabeth", the largest (and lowest-sounding) of the eight Royal Jubilee Bells used at the Thames Diamond Jubilee Pageant and now installed in the church of St James Garlickhythe in the City of London
  - Scotland: Elizabeth Sword, Scottish Sword of State
  - Scotland: Queen Elizabeth II Canal, Grangemouth
  - HMS Queen Elizabeth, a Royal Navy aircraft carrier, is actually named in honour of an earlier HMS Queen Elizabeth, which in turn was named after Elizabeth I, although many sources talk of the carrier as the "namesake" of Elizabeth II
- United States:
  - Queens' Bedroom, The White House, part of a guest suite of rooms that includes the Queens' Sitting Room, named after the many royal guests it has hosted, including the Queen. On the wall hangs an 18th-century painting with a mirror presented to President Harry S. Truman by then-Princess Elizabeth on behalf of her father, George VI, during her visit to Washington, D.C. in 1951
- Queen Elizabeth 2 (QE2): A retired ocean liner originally built for the Cunard Line, which operated by Cunard as both a transatlantic liner and a cruise ship from 1969 to 2008 (except during the Falklands War, when she served as a troopship). Since 18 April 2018, she has been operating as a floating hotel in Dubai.
- Queen Elizabeth cake
- Queenie: a pigeon officially called GB02ER34, the Queen's racing pigeon
- Queenie: a white rhinoceros calf at Cotswold Wildlife Park & Gardens, a zoo based in the grounds and parkland belonging to a 19th-century manor house, in Oxfordshire
- Coronation chicken
- Queen Elizabeth rose, a pink floribunda rose developed in the Coronation year and named after the Queen
- Queen Elizabeth II Silver Jubilee rose (1978)
- Queen Elizabeth II Ruby Anniversary rose (1993)
- Queen Elizabeth II Platinum Jubilee rose (2022)
- The Queen's Commonwealth Canopy (QCC) – an initiative begun in 2015 as a network of forest conservation programs throughout the Commonwealth of Nations

Former:

- United Kingdom: Class 91 91029 Queen Elizabeth II. The railway locomotive was named by the Queen in person in March 1991. It lost its nameplate in the late 1990s when GNER was founded, was renumbered in 2000, withdrawn in 2020 and finally scrapped the following year
- The Queen Elizabeth II Fields Challenge: a programme run by Fields in Trust aiming to protect outdoor recreational spaces across the UK to create a "grassroots legacy" in celebration of the 2012 Diamond Jubilee

== See also ==
- List of titles and honours of Elizabeth II
- Royal eponyms in Canada
