= Statue of Elizabeth II =

Statue of Elizabeth II may refer to:

- Statue of Elizabeth II, Lagos
- Statue of Elizabeth II, Oakham
- Statue of Elizabeth II, York Minster
- Statue of Elizabeth II (Toronto)
- Statue of Elizabeth II (Winnipeg)
- Equestrian statue of Elizabeth II, Windsor Great Park
