= Queen Elizabeth II Bridge (disambiguation) =

The Queen Elizabeth II Bridge is a bridge across the River Thames, England, part of the Dartford Crossing.

Queen Elizabeth II Bridge may also refer to:

- Queen Elizabeth Bridge, Belfast, in Belfast, Northern Ireland, sometimes mistakenly referred to as Queen Elizabeth II Bridge
- Queen Elizabeth II Bridge, Newcastle upon Tyne, a railway bridge across the River Tyne, England
- Queen Elizabeth II Bridge, British Virgin Islands, connecting Beef Island to Tortola in the British Virgin Islands

== See also ==
- Queen Elizabeth Bridge, Windsor, in Windsor, England
