= Port Elizabeth (disambiguation) =

Port Elizabeth was the name of a major city in the Eastern Cape province of South Africa. It was officially renamed Gqeberha on 23 February 2021.

Port Elizabeth may also refer to:

- Port Elizabeth, Newfoundland and Labrador, Canada
- Port Elizabeth, New Jersey, USA
- Port Newark–Elizabeth Marine Terminal, New Jersey, USA
- Port Elizabeth, Saint Vincent and the Grenadines
- Port Elizabeth is a port or bay on the south side of Gilford Island, British Columbia
