= Queen Elizabeth cake =

Cake with coconut topping

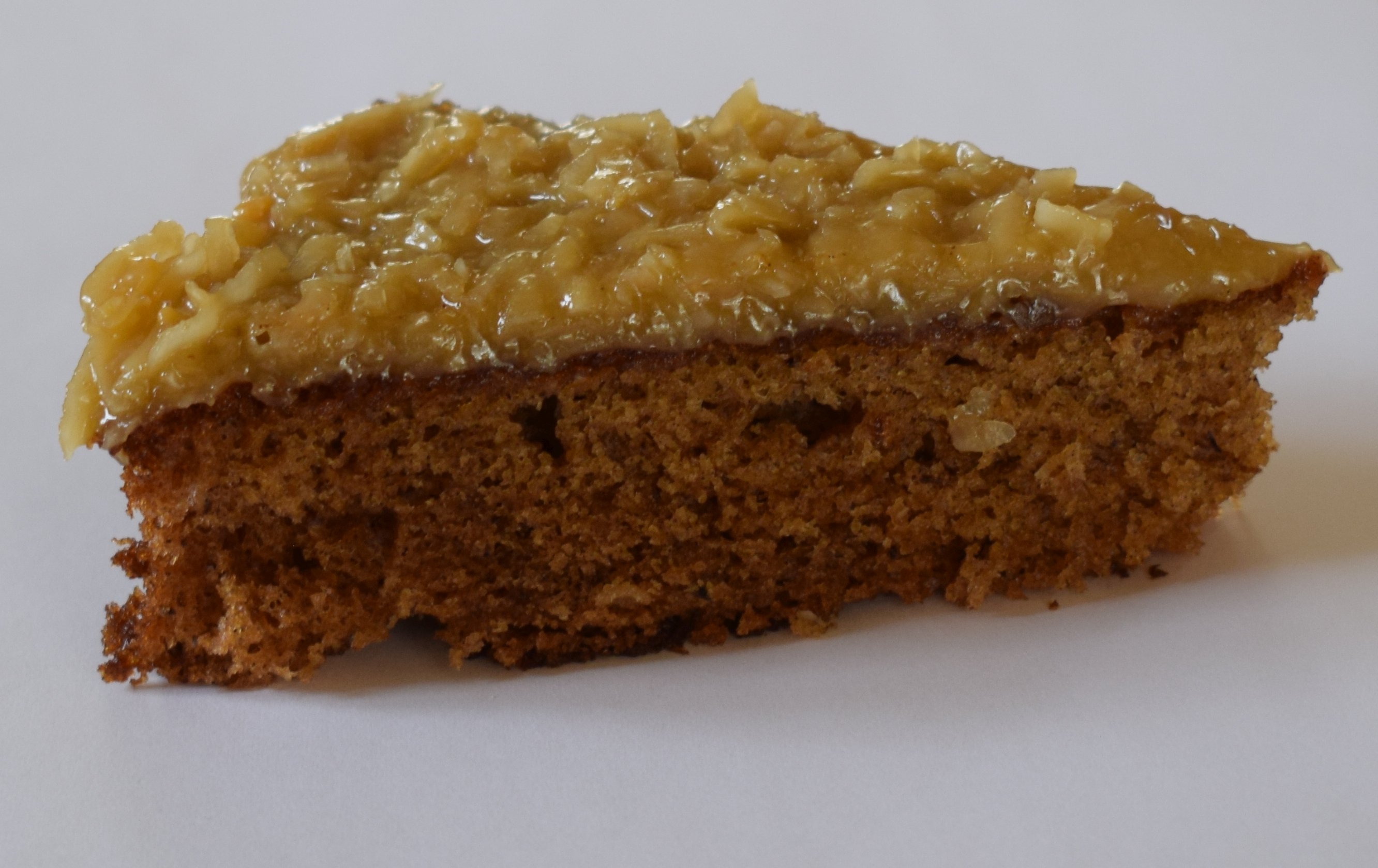
Queen Elizabeth cake

Queen Elizabeth cake is a lightly sweet, moist, and low-fat date cake, topped with a brown sugar, butter and broiled coconut mixture. "Queen Elizabeth cake" is named after the Queen of United Kingdom, Elizabeth II, and may have first been made in 1953 for her coronation. Another account holds that it was invented for the 1937 coronation of King George VI and Queen Elizabeth the Queen Mother. Despite its unsettled origin, the dessert gained national popularity in the 1950s and remains a Canadian staple.

== Overview ==
Queen Elizabeth cake is a dessert cake prepared with sugar, flour, dates, eggs, and butter, and topped with a sugary icing infused with shredded coconut. The cake is named after Elizabeth II. It is a popular cake in Canada. The coconut topping is prepared by broiling or grilling. The icing is prepared using a caramel base. The dates used are chopped, and give the cake a dark coloration. Chopped walnuts or other types of nuts are sometimes used atop the cake. Queen Elizabeth cake is low in fat compared to other cakes, and has a moist consistency. It is sometimes served accompanied with tea. The cake is common at farmers markets and bake sales. It is sometimes purveyed at pastry shops in Canada.

== History ==
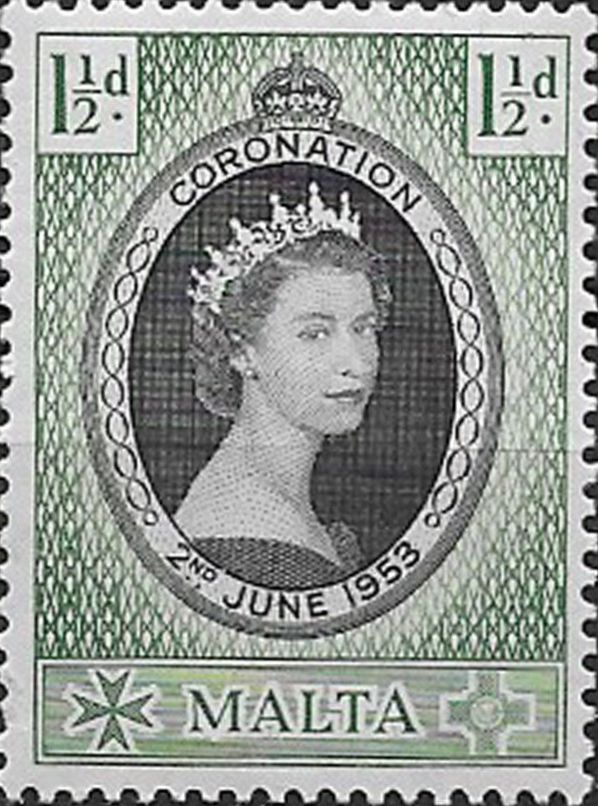
Queen Elizabeth II Malta coronation stamp

An account of Queen Elizabeth cake's origins is that it was prepared for the coronation of Elizabeth II in 1953. During this time, food rationing still existed in Great Britain, and a cake with few ingredients was in order. Another account is that the cake was invented for the 1937 coronation of King George VI and the Queen Mother Queen Elizabeth.

A recipe for Queen Elizabeth cake was published by the Coronation Cook Book in 1953 in celebration of Elizabeth II's coronation.

== See also ==
- List of cakes
- List of things named after Queen Elizabeth II
