= Queenie (name) =

The name Queenie is an affectionate, or pet use, of the term "queen", and is thought to be derived from the word "quean", meaning 'woman' rather than a reference to the monarch or his wife.

As a first name it can also mean "Royal Lady" or "Ruler". In this sense the name is also used as a nickname or pet name for a girl who shares her first name with a Queen. As such, it was popular name during the Victorian era in the British Empire. It was once very popular in London's East End.

== Given name ==
- Q. D. Leavis (1900–1982), English literary critic and essayist
- Queenie Allen (1911–2007), English badminton player
- Queenie Ashton (1903–1999), English-born Australian television- and film actress, stage performer, singer, dancer, and radio personality
- Queenie Chan (born 1980), Hong Kong-born Australian comic artist
- Queenie Chong (born 1987/1988), Brunei businessperson and politician
- Queenie Chu (born 1981), Hong Kong television presenter, actress, and beauty pageant titleholder
- Queenie Foote (1857–1937), American performer
- Queenie H. C. Captain, Indian social worker
- Queenie McKenzie (c. 1915–1998), Aboriginal Australian artist
- Queenie Muriel Francis Adams (1902–1999), English academic, physician, and missionary
- Queenie Mvana, South African politician
- Queenie Paul (1893–1982), Australian performer
- Queenie Rosson (1889–1978), American silent film actress
- Queenie Rynjah (born 1919), Indian social worker and educationist
- Queenie Scott-Hopper (1881–1924), English author of children’s stories, poetry, and devotional literature
- Queenie Smith (1898–1978), American stage-, film-, and television actress
- Queenie Tai (born 1982), Taiwanese actress
- Queenie Thomas (1898–1977), Welsh actress
- Queenie van de Zandt, Australian actress, singer, comedian, recording artist, writer, and arts educator
- Queenie Vassar (1870–1960), Scottish-born American film- and stage actress
- Queenie Watts (1923–1980), English television- and film actress, singer, and publican

== Nickname ==
- Jimmy O'Rourke (baseball) (1883–1955), American MLB player
- Mary Jane Cain (1844–1929), Aboriginal Australian human rights activist
- Merle Oberon (1911–1979), Anglo-Indian actress
- Queenie Newall (1854–1929), English archer
- Stephanie St. Clair (1897–1969), French gangster who operated out of New York's Harlem

== Stage names ==
- Queenie (born 1987), English member of pop quintet King (pop band)
- Queenie Leighton (1874–1943), stage name of British music hall star Lilian Caroline Augusta Rickard
- Queenie Leonard (1905–2002), stage name of English actress and singer Pearl Walker
- Queenie Williams (1896–1962), stage name of Australian actress, singer, and dancer Alfreda Ina Williams

== Animals ==
- Queenie (Melbourne elephant) (died 1944)
- Queenie (waterskiing elephant) (1952–2011)

== Fictional characters ==
- Queenie, in the Australian adult independent animated web series The Amazing Digital Circus
- Queenie (Blackadder), a caricature of Elizabeth I of England in the UK sitcom Blackadder, played by Miranda Richardson
- Queenie Cooper, in the UK comedy drama series Ackley Bridge, played by Jasmine Payne
- Magdalene "Queenie" Shaw, a character from the Fast & Furious franchise, played by Helen Mirren
- Queenie Gibbons, in Noël Coward's play This Happy Breed, played by Jennifer Gray (actress)
- Queenie Goldstein, in the Fantastic Beasts (film series), played by Alison Sudol
- Queenie Hennessy, in the 2012 UK novel The Unlikely Pilgrimage of Harold Fry
- Queenie Jenkins, in the UK TV series Queenie, played by Dionne Brown
- Queenie Kelley, main character in the 1987 Queenie (miniseries), played by Mia Sara
- Queenie or Queeney, a character in the Aubrey–Maturin series of novels by Patrick O'Brian
- Queenie Price, in the UK TV soap opera EastEnders, played by John Labanowski
- Queenie Shepherd, in the UK sitcom Queenie's Castle, played by Diana Dors
- Queenie Trott, in the UK TV soap opera EastEnders, played by Judy Cornwell
- Queenie Yoh, in the 2018 Japanese anime Lost Hope (TV series), voiced by Kana Hanazawa (Japanese) and Laura Post (English)
- Queenie, a dog in Truman Capote's short story A Christmas Memory
- Queenie, in Joseph Moncure March's poem "The Wild Party" (poem)
- Queenie, in the 2008 US romantic fantasy drama film The Curious Case of Benjamin Button (film), played by Taraji P. Henson
- Queenie, in the musical Show Boat, played by Tess Gardella, Alberta Hunter, Helen Dowdy, Ena Cabayo, Karla Burns, Gretha Boston, Sandra Marvin, and Hattie McDaniel
- Queenie, in the US horror anthology TV series American Horror Story, played by Gabourey Sidibe
- Queenie the Dog, in the 1931 US comedy film Queenie of Hollywood
