= Queen Elizabeth Bridge =

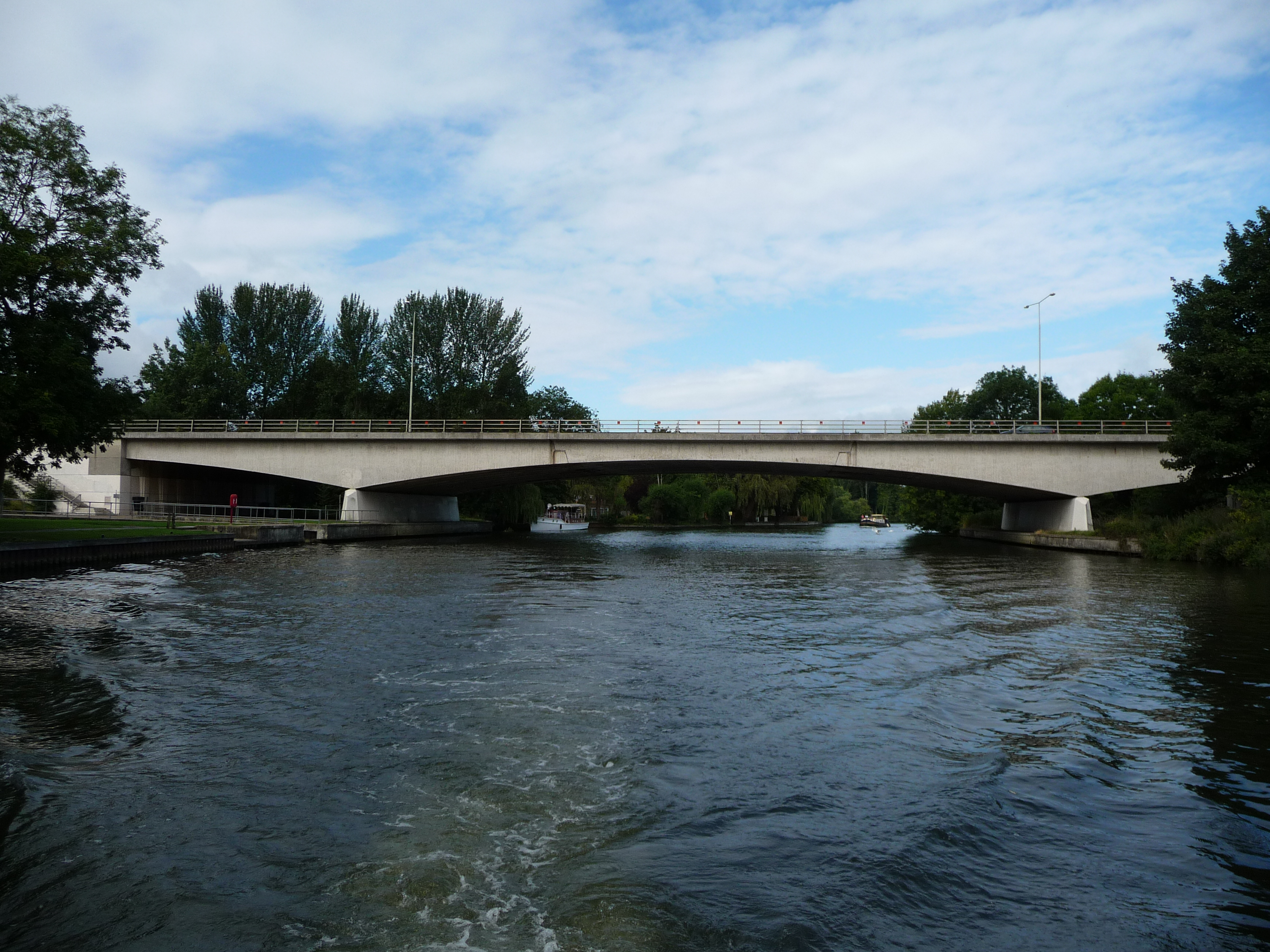
- Queen Elizabeth Bridge looking upstream
- Coordinates: 51°29′12″N 0°37′23″W
- Carries: A332 road
- Crosses: River Thames
- Locale: Windsor

Characteristics
- Height: 20 feet 6 inches (6.25 m)

History
- Opened: 1966

The Queen Elizabeth Bridge is a road bridge just to the west of the town of Windsor, Berkshire, England.

The bridge carries the A332 Royal Windsor Way across the River Thames, on the reach between Romney Lock and Boveney Lock. The bridge was completed in 1966, and has formed the principal road route between Windsor and Slough since 1970, when structural cracks in the nearby Windsor Bridge forced that bridge's closure to all motorised traffic.

== See also ==
- Crossings of the River Thames

Next bridge upstream	River Thames	Next bridge downstream
Summerleaze Footbridge	Queen Elizabeth Bridge	Windsor Railway Bridge
