= Statue of Elizabeth II, York Minster =

Statue of Queen Elizabeth II

Statue of Elizabeth II
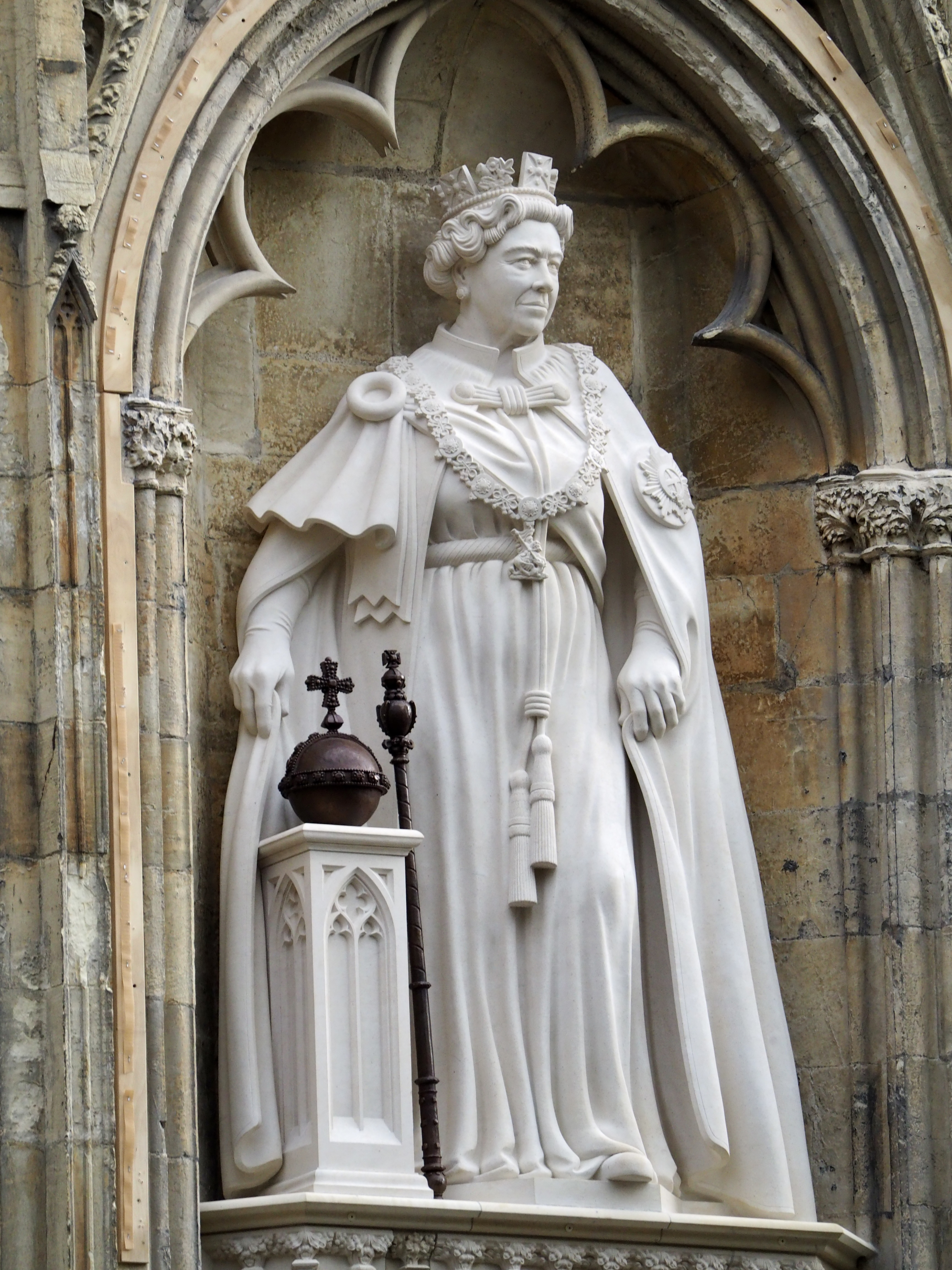
- The statue on the day of unveiling
- 53.9621246°N 1.0832111°W
- Location: York Minster
- Designer: Richard Bossons
- Type: Memorial
- Material: French lepine limestone
- Completion date: August 2022
- Opening date: 9 November 2022
- Dedicated to: Elizabeth II

A statue of Queen Elizabeth II was unveiled at York Minster on 9 November 2022 by King Charles III, two months after the Queen's death in September 2022. The 6ft 7in (2m) tall sculpture was intended to mark the late monarch's Platinum Jubilee and was completed in August 2022, a month before her death. The statue, which stands in a niche on the minster's west front and weighs almost two tonnes, is carved from French lepine limestone. It portrays the Queen wearing her Garter robes and the George IV State Diadem, and holding the orb and sceptre, symbols of authority. The design was chosen by the Queen. The statue was originally to have been unveiled in September 2022, but this was postponed owing to the Queen's death and state funeral that month.
