= Statue of Elizabeth II (Winnipeg) =

Statue in Winnipeg, Manitoba, Canada

- Artist: Leo Mol
- Year: 1970
- Medium: Bronze
- Subject: Elizabeth II
- Dimensions: 2.73 m (9.0 ft)
- Location: Winnipeg, Manitoba, Canada; 49°53′04″N 97°08′44″W

A statue of Elizabeth II by Leo Mol was installed in Winnipeg, Manitoba, Canada.

== Description ==
The bronze sculpture of Elizabeth II is 2.73 metres (9.0 ft) tall.

== History ==
Leo Mol completed the statue in 1970. The sculpture was originally installed in the Steinkopf Gardens at the Centennial Concert Hall, in downtown Winnipeg.

Although Mol had most of his bronze works cast in Germany, he also did perform some of his castings himself, in his studio. “Among the many casts done there was a giant nine foot figure of Queen Elizabeth for the City of Winnipeg – an astonishing achievement for a homemade foundry.”

In July 2010, Elizabeth II visited Winnipeg to rededicate the statue, which was relocated to the Government House grounds. Prince Philip, Duke of Edinburgh also attended the dedication ceremony.

The sculpture, along with another depicting Queen Victoria, was toppled on Canada Day, 1 July 2021, following the Canadian Indian residential schools gravesite discoveries. The statue of Elizabeth II was brought down by and left covered in yellow rope, as well as covered in red paint. Although both queens were constitutional monarchs, meaning they did not make policy or law and were bound to follow the advice and direction of their ministers and parliamentarians, and Canada had ceased to be a colony of Britain in 1931, meaning Elizabeth II reigned in Canada distinctly as Queen of Canada, the protesters who tore the statues down were said to have believed Elizabeth and Victoria represented Canada's colonial history.

As of July 2022, the statue of Elizabeth II was being restored while the statue of Queen Victoria was damaged beyond repair and will not be replaced. The statue was put back in place on 2 June 2023, the 70th anniversary of Elizabeth II's coronation.

== See also ==
- 1970 in art
- Royal monuments in Canada
