= Port Elizabeth, Newfoundland and Labrador =

Settlement in Newfoundland and Labrador, Canada

Coordinates: 47.266°N 54.888°W

Location of Port Elizabeth in Newfoundland and Labrador

Port Elizabeth is a resettled community in the Canadian province of Newfoundland and Labrador. It's located on Davis Island in the Flat Islands archipelago in Placentia Bay.
