= Queen Elizabeth II Bridge, British Virgin Islands =

Bridge in British Virgin Islands

Queen Elizabeth II Bridge
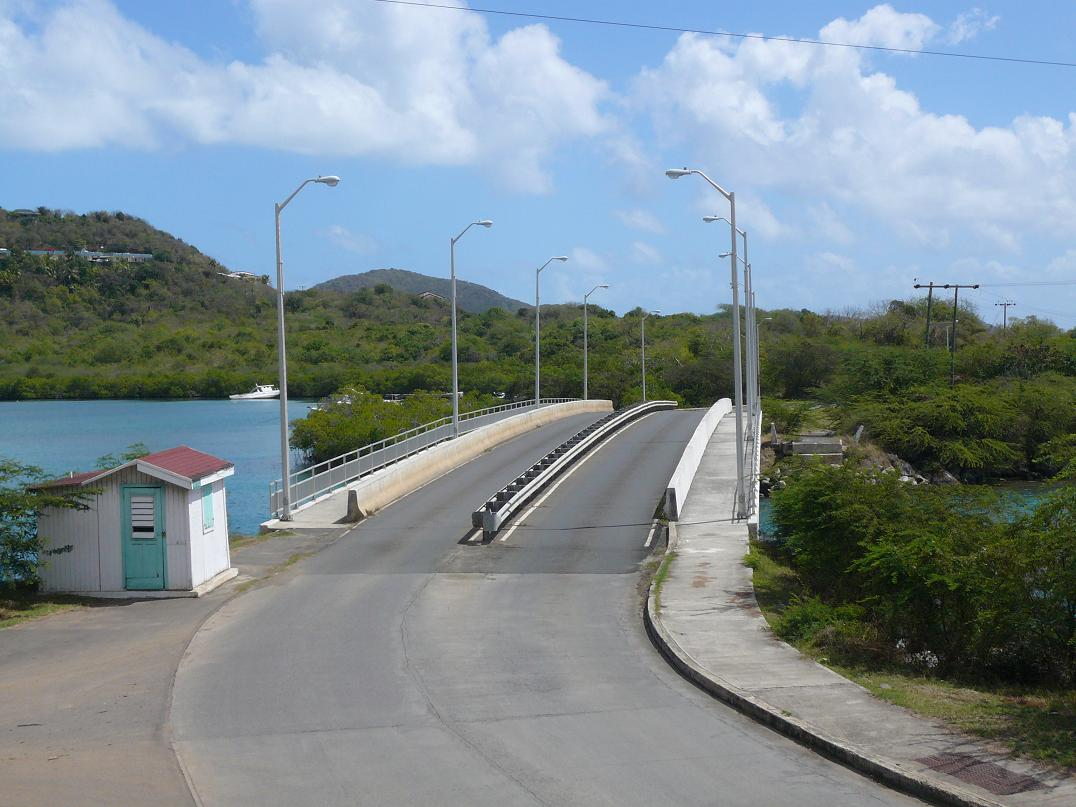
- The Queen Elizabeth II Bridge. The old toll booth can be seen on the left. The remains of the old bridge can be seen on the right.
- Coordinates: 18°26′40″N 64°33′14″W
- Crosses: Well Bay
- Begins: Beef Island
- Ends: Tortola
- Other name: Beef Island Bridge
- Named for: Elizabeth II

Characteristics
- Design: Girder
- Total length: 70 meters (230 ft)
- No. of lanes: 2

History
- Constructed by: CONDE (Samuel S. Condé & Associates)
- Built: 1966
- Rebuilt: 2002

Location
- Interactive map of Queen Elizabeth II Bridge

The Queen Elizabeth II Bridge, sometimes called the Beef Island Bridge, is a bridge, 70 meters (230 ft) long, that links Beef Island with Tortola in the British Virgin Islands. The original bridge was opened in 1966, and was replaced by a new bridge in 2002.

== The First Bridge ==
The first Queen Elizabeth II Bridge was opened in February 1966 by Queen Elizabeth II. The bridge was of steel and stone construction and had a single lane. The bridge proved its worth over the years, but with the extension of Terrance B. Lettsome International Airport and the upgrading of the Road Town/Cane Garden Bay road and the Road Town/West End road, a new bridge was needed. Motorists were often aggravated by having to wait in turn to pass on this single lane bridge, and it was becoming increasingly congested.

After a lengthy feasibility study, the entire area was substantially re-developed thanks to the upgrading and extension of the airport and the widening of the Road Town/Cane Garden Bay road and the Road Town/West End road. The bridge was constructed between 2001 and 2002, and was dedicated by Her Majesty Queen Elizabeth II once more. The bridge is of steel and reinforced concrete construction, and is higher and almost twice as wide as the older bridge. It is able to take large trucks and heavy goods vehicles and has two lanes, compared to the single lane of the old bridge. The bridge has come in line with the increased traffic in the area thanks to the increase in tourism of the British Virgin Islands. The bridge is illuminated at night.

== Controversies ==
=== Construction cost ===
The construction of the new bridge was surrounded by controversy from a relatively early stage. A construction company from the Dominican Republic won the tender to build the new bridge, but then ceased work when the bridge was three quarters finished claiming that the tender specifications were inaccurate. Unsubstantiated allegations were circulated about links between the construction company and members of the ruling Virgin Islands Party. Arbitration proceedings ensued between the contractors and the British Virgin Islands government. Eventually a revised price was agreed, and the final cost of the bridge was approximately 6.73 million U.S. dollars, for a bridge just over 70 meters (230 ft) in length over a shallow strait. Various (unsourced) claims have been advanced from time to time that the bridge is meter for meter and foot for foot the most expensive in the world. In 2003 the Government agreed to pay a further US$115,000 to demolish the old bridge.

=== Yacht racing ===
The Royal BVI Yacht Club sponsors an annual "round Tortola" yacht race. The event became slightly infamous when in the 1970s the Territory's resident surgeon, Robin Tattersall, persuaded the bridge operators to lift the old bridge enabling him to avoid circumnavigating Beef Island as well. Unfortunately the bridge got stuck and could not be reopened for two days, cutting off the airport. Since that date, the race instructions have stipulated Beef Island to port to ensure both islands are circumnavigated. The new bridge cannot now be raised (it is solid concrete), but the race rules still remain the same in any event.

== Tolls ==
Until June 2004 the bridge was a toll bridge. After that date it was made free of charge. Prior to that, Government accounts regularly showed that the tolls cost more to collect than the revenue that they raised, although the toll was popular with tourists, as the toll collector used a half coconut shell nailed to a plank of wood to collect the 25¢ (later 50¢) toll. The government had considered installing an automatic toll booth, but it would have cost $400,000.
