= Elizabeth (given name) =

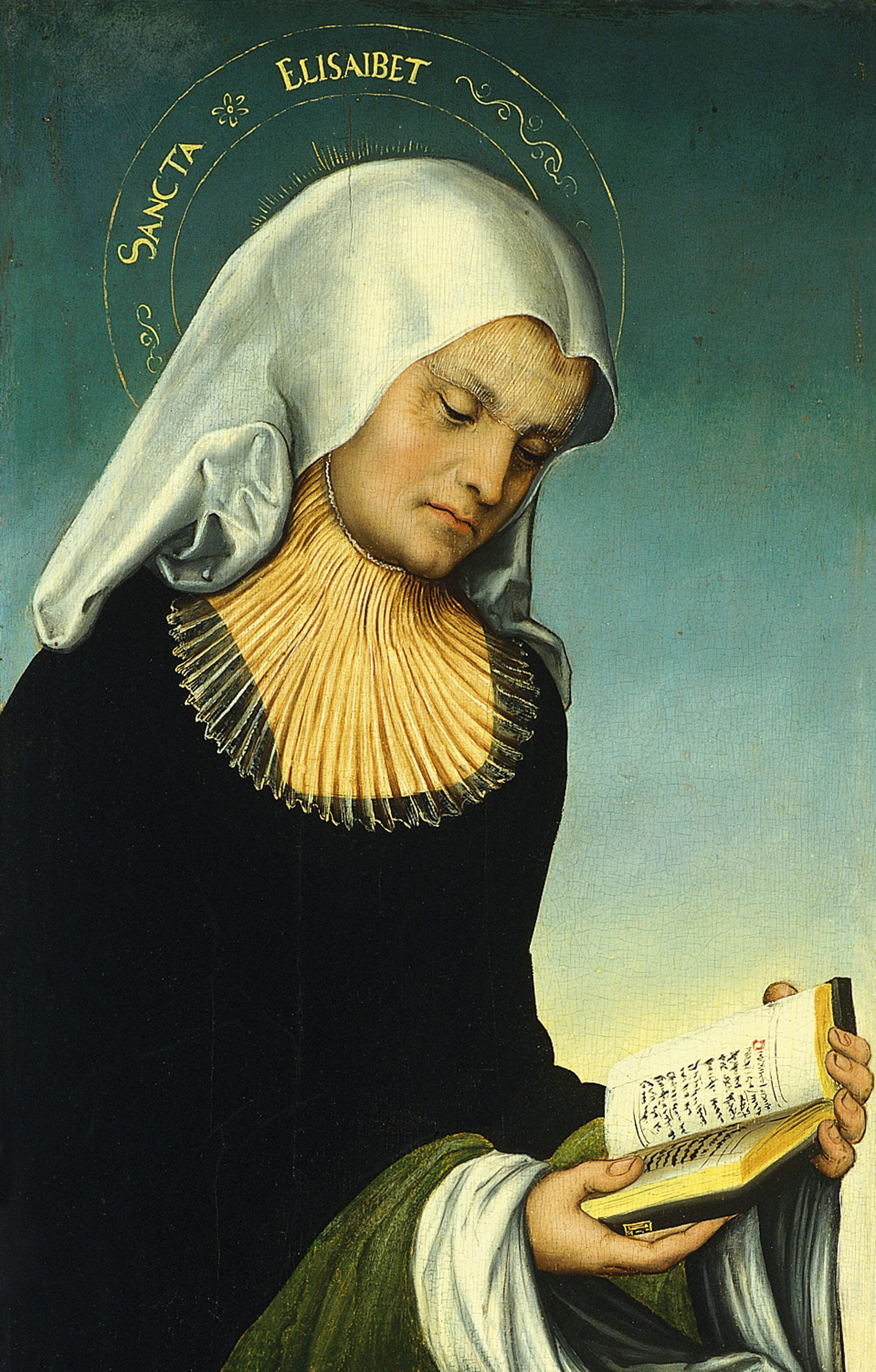
- Detail of Saint Elizabeth in a painting on an altar by Lucas Cranach the Elder
- Pronunciation: /ɪˈlɪzəbəθ/
- Gender: Female
- Language: English

Origin
- Language: Hebrew
- Derivation: Elisheva
- Meaning: My God is an oath
- Region of origin: Hebrew

Other names
- Alternative spelling: Elisabeth
- Related names: Bess; Bessie; Bessy; Beth; Betsy; Bettina; Betty; Biff; Buffy; Ellie; Eliza; Elise; Els; Elsa; Else; Elseena; Elsebeth; Elspeth; Isabel; Isabella; Isabelle; Lettie; Libby; Lisa; Lise; Lisbeth; Liza; Liz; Lizbeth; Lizzie; Lizzy
- Popularity: see popular names

Elizabeth is a feminine given name, a variation of the Hebrew name Elisheva (אֱלִישֶׁבַע), meaning "My God is an oath" or "My God is abundance", as rendered in the Septuagint.

== Occurrence in the Bible ==
"Elizabeth" appears in the Hebrew Bible as the name of Aaron's wife ("Elisheva" in the Hebrew Bible), and in the New Testament as the name of the wife of the priest Zechariah and mother of John the Baptist. It has also been the name of several saints and queens.

== Statistics ==
The name has many variants in use across the world and has been in consistent use worldwide. Elizabeth was the tenth most popular name given to baby girls in the United States in 2007 and has been among the 25 most popular names given to girls in the United States for the past 100 years. It is the only name that remained in the top ten US girls' names list from 1925 to 1972.

In the early 21st century, Elizabeth has been among the top 50 names given to girls in the past 10 years born in England and Wales, as well Canada and Australia, and has been in the top 100 most popular names given to baby girls born in Scotland and Ireland. In 2022, it was the 25th most popular name given to girls in Canada. Elizaveta (Eлизaвeтa), a Russian form of the name, has been in the top 10 names given to baby girls born in Moscow, Russia in the past 10 years. The name is also popular in Ukraine and Belarus.

== Name variants ==
- Elisabeta, Elisa, Liza, Izabela (Albanian)
- أليصابات, أليشابع, إِلِيزَابِيث (ʾAlīṣābāt, ʾAlīšābaʿ, ʾIlīzābīṯ) (Arabic)
- Ilisapesi (Tongan)
- Irihāpeti, Elisapeta (Māori)
- ელისაბედ (Elisabed) (Georgian)
- Aelswith, Aelswithia, Elesabeth, Elizabeth, Elyzabeth (English)
- Ⲉⲗⲉⲥⲁⲃⲏⲕ (Ilisabek) (Coptic)
- Alžběta, Eliška (Czech)
- Alžbeta (Slovak)
- Ealasaid (Scottish Gaelic)
- Ealisaid (Manx)
- Eibhlís, Eilís, Éilis, Isibéal (Irish)
- Elesbed (Breton)
- Elizabete, Isabel, Elisabete (Portuguese)
- Eliisabet, Eliise (Estonian)
- Elikapeka (Hawaiian)
- Elisa (Finnish, Turkish)
- Elizabeti (Swahili)
- Elizabeth, Elisabet, Elisabeth (Indonesian)
- Elisabet (Catalan, Danish, Finnish, German, Dutch, Spanish, Swedish)
- Elísabet (Icelandic)
- Elisabeta (Romanian)
- Élisabeth, Élizabeth (French)
- Elisabeth (Catalan, English, Danish, Dutch, German, Norwegian, Swedish)
- Elizabeto (Esperanto)
- Elisabetta (Italian)
- Ελισάβετ (Elisávet), Ζαμπέτα (Zabéta) (Greek)
- Eлисавета (Elisaveta) (Bulgarian)
- Альжбета (Alžbieta) (Belarusian)
- אֱלִישֶׁבַע (ʾĔlīšæḇaʿ) (Hebrew)
- Elixabete (Basque)
- Elizabeta (Albanian, Croatian, Bosnian, Slovene)
- Elizabete (Basque, Latvian)
- 엘리자베스 (Ellijabeseu) (Korean)
- Elishua (Malayalam)
- Elsebeth (Danish)
- Elsbeth (Dutch, German, Scots, Swiss German)
- Elspeth (Scots)
- Êlizabét (Vietnamese)
- Елизабета, Јелисавета (Elizabeta, Jelisaveta) (Serbian, Macedonian)
- Елизaвета, Элизабет (Yelizaveta, Elizaveta, Elizabet) (Russian)
- Єлизавета, Елізабет (Yelyzaveta, Elizabet) (Ukrainian)
- Elžbieta, Elzbute (Lithuanian)
- Elżbieta, Izabela (Polish)
- エリザベス (Erizabesu) (Japanese)
- Erzsébet (Hungarian)
- Isabella (Italian, Dutch)
- Isabelle (French, Dutch)
- Isabel (Spanish, Dutch)
- Եղիսաբեթ (Yeghisabet), Ելսաբեթ (Elsabet) (Armenian)
- 伊丽莎白; Yī lì shā bái (Chinese, simplified)
- 伊麗莎白; Yīlìshābái (Chinese, traditional)
- এলিজাবেথ (Ēlijābētha) (Bengali)
- એલિઝાબેથ (Ēlijhābētha) (Gujarati)
- एलिज़ाबेथ (Ēlizābētha) (Hindi)
- ಎಲಿಜಬೆತ್ (Elijabet) (Kannada)
- एलिझाबेथ (Ēlijhābētha) (Marathi)
- Элизабет (Elizabyet) (Mongolian)
- एलिजाबेथ (Ēlijābētha) (Nepali)
- الیزابت (Alizābt) (Persian/Farsi)
- ਇਲੀਸਬਤ (Ilīsabata) (Punjabi)
- எலிசபெத் (Elicapet) (Tamil)
- ఎలిజబెత్ (Elijabet) (Telugu)
- เอลิซาเบธ (Elisābeṭh) (Thai)
- الزبتھ (Elizebath) (Urdu)
- עליזאַבעטה (Elizabeta) (Yiddish)

=== Diminutives ===
- Chabela, Isabelita, Ybel, Ysabel, Yzabel, Yzabela (Spanish)
- Erzsi (Hungarian)
- Isabeau (French)
- Isabel (Catalan, English, Indonesian, Norwegian, Portuguese, Spanish, French)
- Isabela (Spanish, Indonesian, Portuguese, Italian)
- Isabell (English, German, Norwegian)
- Isabella (Dutch, English, Indonesian, Italian, Norwegian, Polish, Portuguese, Spanish, Swedish)
- Isabelle (English, French, Indonesian, German)
- Isave (Vietnamese)
- Isbal, Ysbal (Manx)
- Isbel, Isebella, Izabelle, Lisabeth, Lizabeth, Sabella, Sissy (English)
- Iseabail (Scottish Gaelic)
- Ishbel, Isobel (Scots)
- Isibéal, Sibéal (Irish)
- Izabel (Portuguese (archaic), Spanish, Polish)
- Izabela (Czech, Polish)
- Izabella (Hungarian, Polish)
- Lettie (Greek, Latin)
- Liesbeth, Lijsbeth (Dutch)
- Lisabella (Italian)
- Lisbet (Danish, Indonesian, Norwegian, Swedish)
- Lisbeth (German, Indonesian, Norwegian, Danish)
- Lizbeth (Spanish, chiefly Latin American)
- Sabela (Galician)
- Špela (Slovene)
- Zabel, Liza (Armenian)
- Λίζα, Βέτα (Liza, Veta) (Greek)
- Јелисавка, Савета, Савка (Jelisavka, Saveta, Savka) (Serbian)
- Лизa (Liza) (Russian, Serbian)
- Ліза (Liza) (Ukrainian, Belarusian)
- Лісавета (Lisaveta) (Ukrainian)
- ლიზა, ლიზი, ლიზიკო (Liza, Lizi, Liziko) (Georgian)

=== First half ===
- Ailsa (Danish)
- Aley, Aleyamma, Aleykutty (Malayalam)
- Alzira, Elisete, Lilianna (Portuguese)
- Ealee, Ealish (Manx)
- Eilís, Éilis (Irish language)
- Ela, Elunia, Elzira, Elżunia (Polish)
- Elbie (Afrikaans)
- Elise, Ella, Ellisif (Norwegian)
- El, Elly (English, Dutch)
- Eli (Catalan, English, Spanish)
- Eli, Eliamma, Elseena (Malayalam)
- Eliisa (Finnish)
- Elis, Elschen (German)
- Elisa (Finnish, Italian, Norwegian, Spanish, Portuguese)
- Élise, Elysée, Liset, Lisette, Lizette, Lysa (French)
- Eliška, Líza (Czech) and (Slovak)
- Elina, Elena (Bulgarian)
- Eliso, Lizi (Georgian)
- Elissa (English, Indonesian, Norwegian)
- Eliza (Albanian, English, Indonesian, Polish)
- Elka (Albanian, Polish)
- Ellee, Elsie, Elyse, Leesa, Lizzy, Liz, Lysette (English)
- Elli (Finnish, German)
- Ellie (Origin unknown)
- Els, Liesje, Liselot (Dutch)
- Elsa (Catalan, Dutch, Finnish, German, Indonesian, Italian, Norwegian, Portuguese, Spanish, Swedish)
- Else (Danish, German, Norwegian)
- Elts, Liis, Liisbet, Liisu (Estonian)
- Elza (Hebrew)
- Elzė (Lithuanian)
- Erzsi, Lilike, Zsóka (Hungarian)
- Ilsa, Liesa, Lieschen, Liese, Liesel, Liesl, Lilli, Lys (German)
- Ilse (Dutch, German)
- Isa (Spanish, Portuguese)
- Issa, Iza, Liseta, Yza (Spanish)
- Izzie (English)
- Izzy (English, Norwegian)
- Lela (Serbian)
- Lies (Dutch, German)
- Lieselotte (German, Swedish)
- Liisa, Liisi, Liis (Estonian, Finnish)
- Lila (mostly for kids) (Catalan, Indonesian, Polish)
- Lili (French, Polish)
- Liliana, Liliani (Indonesian)
- Lis (Danish, English, Norwegian, Swedish)
- Lisa (Catalan, Danish, English, German, Indonesian, Italian, Norwegian, Swedish, Portuguese, Spanish, Polish, Welsh)
- Lisanne (Dutch, English, Norwegian)
- Lise (French, Norwegian)
- Liselotte (Danish, German, Norwegian)
- Lisen (Swedish)
- Liz, Liza (English, Indonesian, Polish, Russian, Ukrainian)
- Lizina (Latvian)
- Lizzie, Lizzy (English, Norwegian)

=== Middle ===
- Babette (French)
- Ibbie, Ibby, Issy, Issie, Libby, Libbie, Liddy, Liddie (English)
- Liba (archaic, rural areas) (Catalan)
- Isa (German)

=== Second half ===
- Beileag (Scottish Gaelic)
- Bel (Catalan)
- Belita (Spanish)
- Bella (Italian)
- Bess, Bessie, Beth, Betsy, Betsey, Bette, Bettie, Betty, Bettye, Birdie, Bitsy, Buffy, Zabeth (English)
- Běta, Bětka, Bětuška (Czech)
- Bethan, Betsan (Welsh)
- Betka (Slovak)
- Betta (Italian)
- Betti (German)
- Bettina (German, Italian, Hungarian)
- Etti, Etty, Essie, Ettie (Estonian)

== People with the given name ==
=== Biblical figures ===
- Elizabeth, mother of John the Baptist (1st century BC).

=== Royalty ===
- Empress Elizabeth, lists various empresses named Elizabeth
- Queen Elizabeth, lists various queens named Elizabeth
  - Elizabeth I (1533–1603; r. 1558–1603), queen regnant of England and Ireland
  - Elizabeth II (1926–2022; r. 1952–2022), queen regnant of the United Kingdom and other Commonwealth realms
  - Queen Elizabeth the Queen Mother (1900–2002), queen consort of the United Kingdom and British Dominions, mother of Elizabeth II
- Princess Elizabeth, lists various princesses named Elizabeth
  - Elizabeth of Palatinate-Zweibrücken (1642–1677), Princess Consort of Anhalt-Bernburg
  - Elizabeth Richeza of Poland (1288–1335), Polish princess of the House of Piast and by her two marriages Queen consort of Bohemia and Poland and Duchess consort of Austria and Styria
  - Elizabeth of Slavonia (1352 – c. 1380), heir presumptive to the Hungarian throne
  - Elizabeth of Töss (1292 – c. 1336), Hungarian princess and the last member of the House of Árpád

=== Other aristocrats ===
- Countess Elisabeth of Leuchtenberg (1537–1579), German noblewoman
- Countess Elisabeth of Nassau (1577–1642), the second daughter of prince William of Orange and his third spouse Charlotte of Bourbon, and Duchess of Bouillon by marriage
- Countess Elizabeth Dobrženský von Dobrženitz (1875–1951), Bohemian noblewoman
- Elisabeth of Austria (c. 1285 – 1353), member of the House of Habsburg and Duchess of Lorraine
- Élisabeth Charlotte d'Orléans (1676–1744), princess of Commercy
- Elizabeth of Bavaria, Duchess of Austria (c. 1306 – 1330), the first wife of Otto, Duke of Austria
- Elizabeth of Blois, Duchess of Apulia (c. 1130 – after 1175), French noblewoman and later nun at Fontevraud
- Elisabeth of Brandenburg, Duchess of Brunswick-Calenberg-Göttingen (1510–1558) German noblewoman
- Elisabeth of Carinthia (c. 1262 – 1312), Duchess of Austria and Queen of Germany
- Elizabeth of Carinthia (1298–1352), Queen consort of Sicily
- Elizabeth of Frankopan (1386–1422), Croat noblewoman and Countess of Celje
- Elizabeth of Görlitz (1390–1451), reigning Duchess of Luxemburg
- Elisabeth Juliana Francisca of Hesse-Homburg (1681–1707), German landgravine
- Elizabeth of Hesse-Kassel, Duchess of Mecklenburg (1596–1625), German noblewoman
- Elizabeth of Holstein-Rendsburg (c. 1300 – before 1340), Duchess of Saxe-Lauenburg, regent of the Duchy of Saxe-Lauenburg during the minority of her son and queen consort of Denmark
- Elizabeth of Lancaster, Duchess of Exeter (1363–1426), younger daughter and second surviving child of John of Gaunt, 1st Duke of Lancaster and Blanche of Lancaster
- Elisabeth of Nassau-Hadamar (died 1412), abbess in Essen, Germany
- Elizabeth of Nevers (1439–1483), French noblewoman and Duchess of Cleves
- Elizabeth of Poland, Duchess of Pomerania (1326–1361), Polish noblewoman and Pomeranian Duchess
- Elizabeth of Serbia (fl. 1270 — died 1331), Baness consort of Bosnia
- Elisabeth van den Eynde, Princess of Belvedere (1674–1743), Italian noblewoman
- Elizabeth von Arnim (1866–1941), Australian-born writer and German aristocrat by marriage
- Elisabeth von Matsch (c. 1380s – c. 1439), last countess of Toggenburg
- Elizabeth Apsley (died 1626), English courtier
- Elizabeth Bacon (c. 1541 – 1621), English aristocrat
- Elisabeth Bagréeff-Speransky (1799–1857), Russian noblewoman and writer
- Elizabeth Báthory (1560–1614), niece of the Polish King Stephen Báthory; Hungarian countess and murderer
- Elizabeth Beauchamp, Baroness Bergavenny (1415–1448), English baroness
- Elisabeth Berenberg (1749–1822, German banker and heiress
- Elizabeth Berlay (died 1518), English lady in waiting
- Elizabeth Blount (died 1540), English noblewoman and mistress of Henry VIII
- Elizabeth Boleyn, Countess of Wiltshire (1480–1538), English noblewoman
- Elizabeth Boleyn (lady-in-waiting), English noblewoman
- Elizabeth Bourchier, 4th Baroness Bourchier (c.1399–1432), English noblewoman
- Elizabeth Bourchier (died 1557), English noblewoman
- Elizabeth Bruce (born c. 1327), daughter of Robert I of Scotland
- Elizabeth Brydges (c. 1575–1617), English aristocrat, Maid of Honour to Elizabeth I, and victim of bigamy
- Elizabeth Burghersh, 3rd Baroness Burghersh, English noblewoman
- Elizabeth Campbell, Duchess of Argyll (1824–1878), British noblewoman and abolitionist
- Elizabeth Capell, Countess of Essex (1636–1718), English noblewoman
- Elizabeth Carew, mistress of Henry VIII
- Elizabeth Carnegy, Baroness Carnegy of Lour (1925–2010), British peer
- Elizabeth Cecil, 15th Baroness Ros (1570–1591), English noblewoman
- Élisabeth Charlotte d'Orléans (1676–1744), Duchess consort of Lorraine and Bar
- Elizabeth Charlotte, Madame Palatine (1652–1722), Duchess of Orléans
- Elizabeth Charlotte of the Palatinate, Electress of Brandenburg (1597–1660), Duchess of Prussia
- Elizabeth Cheney (1422–1473), English noblewoman
- Elizabeth Claypole (1629–1658), daughter of Oliver Cromwell, Lord Protector of the Commonwealth of England, Scotland and Ireland
- Elizabeth Compton, Countess of Northampton (1694–1740), British peer
- Elisabeth Corvinus (1496–1508), last member of the Hungarian Royal House of Hunyadi
- Elizabeth Cromwell (1598 –1665) wife of Oliver Cromwell, Lord Protector of the Commonwealth of England, Scotland and Ireland
- Elizabeth Cromwell (1598–1665), the wife of Oliver Cromwell and Her Highness the Lady Protector
- Elizabeth Danvers (1545–1630), English noblewoman
- Elizabeth de Bohun, Countess of Northampton (1313–1356), English noblewoman and co-heiress of her brother Giles de Badlesmere, 2nd Baron Badlesmere
- Elizabeth de Burgh, 4th Countess of Ulster (1332–1363), Norman-Irish noblewoman
- Elizabeth de Comyn (1299–1372), English noblewoman
- Elizabeth Douglas-Hamilton, Duchess of Hamilton (1916–2008), English-born Scottish noblewoman
- Elizabeth Fitzalan, Duchess of Norfolk (1366– 1425), English noblewoman
- Elizabeth Granowska (1372–1420), queen consort of Poland
- Elizabeth Hamilton, comtesse de Gramont (1641–1708), Irish-born courtier and French noblewoman
- Elizabeth Harcourt, Countess Harcourt (1747–1826), British courtier
- Elizabeth Hay, Countess of Erroll (1801–1856), British aristocrat and illegitimate daughter of King William IV
- Elizabeth Herbert, Countess of Pembroke (1737–1831), English noblewoman
- Elizabeth Hussey, Baroness Hungerford (c. 1510–1554), English noblewoman
- Elizabeth Keith, Countess of Huntly (born 1515), Scottish noblewoman
- Elizabeth Kekaaniau (1834–1928), Hawaiian chief, great-grandniece of Kamehameha I
- Elisabeth Kemeys-Tynte, 10th Baroness Wharton (1906–1974), English peer
- Elizabeth Lackfi (died 1428), Hungarian noblewoman
- Elizabeth Leveson-Gower, Duchess of Sutherland (1765–1839), Scottish noblewoman
- Elizabeth Leyburne (1536–1567), English noblewoman
- Elizabeth Maitland, Duchess of Lauderdale (1626–1698), Scottish noblewoman
- Elizabeth Manners, Duchess of Rutland, English aristocrat
- Elisabeth von Matsch, Swiss noblewoman
- Elizabeth Montagu, Duchess of Manchester (c. 1740–1832), English noblewoman
- Elisabeth Canori Mora (1774–1825), Italian Roman Catholic mystic
- Elizabeth Mortimer (1371–1417), English noblewoman
- Elizabeth Mure (1320–1355), wife of Robert, High Steward of Scotland
- Elizabeth Noel, Viscountess Campden (1640–1683), wife of Baptist Noel, 3rd Viscount Campden
- Elizabeth Nugent (died 1645), Irish noblewoman
- Elizabeth O'Brien, Countess of Inchiquin (1651–1718), English noblewoman
- Elizabeth Vere Drummond Ogilvie (1909–1997), British baroness
- Elizabeth Pakenham, 1st Countess of Longford (1719–1794), Irish noblewoman
- Elizabeth Paulet (1533–1576), English noblewoman
- Elizabeth Percy, Countess of Northumberland (1646–1690), English noblewoman
- Elizabeth Percy, Duchess of Northumberland (1716–1776), British peeress
- Elizabeth Petty, Baroness Shelburne (1636–1708), Anglo-Irish peeress
- Elizabeth Philipps, Viscountess St Davids (1884–1974), British peeress
- Elizabeth Pierrepont, Duchess of Kingston-upon-Hull (1721–1788), English courtier
- Elizabeth Ponsonby (1900–1940), English aristocrat
- Elizabeth Preston, Countess of Desmond (died 1628), Irish Countess
- Elizabeth Raleigh (1565–1647), English gentlewoman and lady-in-waiting
- Elizabeth Rawdon, Countess of Moira (1731–1808), Irish noblewoman
- Elizabeth Savage, Countess Rivers and Viscountess Savage (1581–1651), English noblewoman
- Elizabeth Scales (died 1473), English noblewoman, Countess Rivers and 8th Baroness Scales
- Elizabeth Scott, Duchess of Buccleuch (1743–1827), English-born Scottish peeress
- Elizabeth Scott, Duchess of Buccleuch (1954–2023), Scottish peeress
- Elizabeth Schaw, Countess of Annandale (died 1640), Scottish courtier and servant to Anne of Denmark
- Elizabeth Smith-Stanley, Countess of Derby (1753–1797), English peeress
- Elizabeth Somerset, Baroness Herbert (1476–1507), English noblewoman
- Elizabeth Southwell (1674–1709), English noblewoman
- Elizabeth Stanley, Countess of Derby (1575–1627), English noblewoman and courtier
- Elizabeth Stuart, Countess of Lennox (1555–1582), English noblewoman and a close relation to both the English and Scottish thrones
- Elizabeth Stuart (1596–1662), queen consort of Bohemia and Electress of the Palatinate
- Elizabeth Sutherland, 24th Countess of Sutherland (1921–2019), Scottish noblewoman
- Elizabeth Symons, Baroness Symons of Vernham Dean (born 1951), British politician and trade unionist
- Elizabeth Szilágyi (1410–1483), Hungarian queen and noblewoman
- Elizabeth Talbot, Duchess of Norfolk (c. 1443 – 1507), English noblewoman
- Elizabeth Temkina, Russian alleged daughter of Catherine the Great and Grigory Potemkin
- Elizabeth Tilney, Countess of Surrey (1445–1497), English noblewoman
- Elizabeth Trevannion (1563–1641), English aristocrat and keeper of Prince Charles
- Elizabeth Trussell, Countess of Oxford (c. 1496–1527), English noblewoman
- Elizabeth Waldegrave, Countess Waldegrave (1760–1816), British noblewoman, courtier and society beauty
- Elizabeth Woodville (1437–1492) queen consort of England as the wife of Edward IV
- Elizabeth Wray, 3rd Baroness Norreys (c. 1603 – 1645), English noblewoman
- Elizabeth Wriothesley, Countess of Southampton (1572–1655), English noblewoman
- Elizabeth Wyckes (died 1529), wife of Thomas Cromwell, Earl of Essex and minister to Henry VIII of England
- Elisabeth Ypsilantis (1770–1866), Greek aristocrat
- Lady Elizabeth Finch-Hatton (1760–1825), British aristocrat

=== Religion ===
- Elizabeth Alfred (1914–2015), Australian Anglican deaconess
- Elizabeth Awut Ngor, South Sudanese Anglican bishop
- Elizabeth Barr (1905–1995), Scottish Presbyterian minister
- Elizabeth Barton (1506–1534), English Catholic nun and martyr
- Elizabeth Bathurst (1655–1685), English Quaker preacher and theologian
- Élisabeth Bergeron (1851–1936), Canadian Venerable religious servant
- Elizabeth Boase (born 1963), Australian Old Testament biblical scholar
- Elizabeth Colenso (1821–1904), New Zealand missionary, teacher and bible translator
- Elizabeth Chadwick (missionary) (1869–1940), Irish missionary and educator in Uganda and Kenya
- Elizabeth Coles Bouey (1891–1957), American missionary
- Elizabeth Bowes (1505–1572), English Protestant exile
- Elizabeth Coggeshall (1754–1825), American Quaker minister
- Elizabeth Cressener (1457–1536), English Dominican prioress
- Élisabeth de Chimay (1926–2023), French-born Belgian princess and writer
- Elizabeth Eaton (born 1955), American Lutheran bishop
- Elizabeth Evelinge (c. 1597 – 1668), English Catholic abbess and translator
- Elizabeth Fedde (1850–1921), Norwegian Lutheran Deaconess
- Elizabeth Ferard (1825–1883), Anglo-French gentlewoman and first deaconess of the Church of England
- Elizabeth Bonforte Gardner (born 1965), American Episcopal Bishop
- Elizabeth Mary Goodlet (1854–1926), Australian church worker and philanthropist
- Elisabeth Haseloff (1914–1974), German Lutheran pastor
- Élisabeth Haudry (c. 1727–1800), French noblewoman and salon-holder
- Elizabeth Hesselblad (1870–1957), Swedish religious foundress
- Elizabeth Kinniburgh (1929–2016), Scottish ordained female minister
- Elizabeth Knatchbull (1584–1629), English Benedictine abbess
- Elizabeth Litchfield Cunnyngham (1831–1911), American missionary and church worker
- Elizabeth Livingstone (1929–2023), English Anglican theologian
- Elizabeth Lorde (died 1551), English Benedictine prioress
- Elizabeth Lutton (c. 1498 – 1553), abducted English Benedictine nun
- Elizabeth Platz, American Lutheran pastor
- Elizabeth Schrader Polczer (born 1979), American biblical scholar and singer-songwriter
- Elizabeth Poole (prophetess) (1622–1668), English prophetess and writer
- Elizabeth Clare Prophet (1939–2009), American spiritual leader
- Elizabeth Prout (1820–1864), English Catholic, founder of Passionist Sisters
- Elizabeth Ritchie (1831–1903), British Methodist biographer
- Elizabeth Lownes Rust (1835–1899), American philanthropist, humanitarian, Christian missionary
- Elizabeth Sander (died 1607), English Bridgettine nun and writer
- Elizabeth Tikvah Sarah (born 1955), British rabbi and author
- Elizabeth Missing Sewell (1815–1906), English author of religious and other texts
- Elizabeth Shirley (1564–1641), English Augustinian nun and author
- Elizabeth Bowen Thompson (1812/1813–1869), British missionary who founded of the British Syrian Schools
- Elizabeth Ursic (born 1959), American theologian and scholar
- Elisabeth von Thurn und Taxis (born 1982), German aristocrat and writer
- Elisabeth Helene von Vieregg (1679–1704), Danish noble and lady-in-waiting of German origin
- Elisabeth Wandscherer (died 1535), Dutch Anabaptist
- Elizabeth Zouche (c. 1496 – 1553), 16th-century English Benedictine abbess

=== Saints ===
- Elizabeth of Aragon or Elizabeth of Portugal (1271–1336), queen consort of Portugal
- Elizabeth of Hungary (1207–1231), Hungarian princess and saint
- Elisabeth of Schönau (1129–1164), German Benedictine visionary
- Elizabeth of Reute (1386–1420) German Franciscan tertiary sister and purported stigmatist
- Elizabeth of the Trinity (1880–1906), French Carmelite nun
- Elizabeth Ann Seton (1774–1821), American educator
- Princess Elisabeth of Hesse and by Rhine (1864–1918), Eastern Orthodox saint and wife of Grand Duke Sergei Alexandrovich of Russia
- Elizabeth of Pasărea (1970–2014), Romanian schemanun

=== Politicians and activists ===
- Elisabeth Aasen (1922–2009), Norwegian politician
- Elizabeth Abbott (born 1946), Canadian writer, historian, and animal rights activist
- Elizabeth Ackroyd (1910–1987), British civil servant
- Elizabeth Adekogbe (1919–1968), Nigerian women's rights activist
- Elizabeth Adjei, Ghanaian diplomat
- Elizabeth Afoley Quaye (born 1970), Ghanaian politician
- Elizabeth Agyemang (born 1949), Ghanaian politician
- Elizabeth Aipira, Malawian politician
- Elizabeth Alpha-Lavalie (1947–2013), Sierra Leonean politician
- Elizabeth Amoaa (born 1983), Ghanaian advocate
- Elizabeth Amoah Tetteh (born 1945), educationist and Ghanaian politician
- Elizabeth Amukugo (born 1954), Namibian politician
- Elizabeth Andrews (1882–1960), first woman organizer of the Labour Party in Wales
- Elizabeth B. Andrews (1911–2002), American politician
- Elisabeth Arnold, Canadian politician
- Elizabeth Arrieta (1960–2019), Uruguayan politician and engineer
- Elizabeth P. Arriola (1928–2002), Democratic Party of Guam politician
- Elisabeth Aspaker (born 1962), Norwegian politician
- Elizabeth Astete (born 1952), Foreign Minister of Peru
- Elizabeth Ativie, Nigerian politician
- Elizabeth Azcona Bocock (born 1969), Honduran politician
- Elizabeth Bagley (born 1952), American diplomat
- Elisabeth Barbier (1912–1968), French resistance leader
- Elizabeth Barrett-Anderson (born 1953), Guamanian lawyer, judge and politician
- Élisabeth Baume-Schneider (born 1963), Swiss Federal Councillor
- Elisabeth Bauriedel (born 1939), German politician
- Elizabeth Beikiriize Karungi (born 1976), Ugandan politician
- Elizabeth Bennett-Parker, House of Delegates member of Virginia
- Elisabeth Bennington (born 1976), American politician
- Elisabeth Berge (1954–2020), Norwegian civil servant
- Élisabeth Beton Delègue (born 1955), French diplomat
- Elizabeth Biddulph, Baroness Biddulph (1834–1916), English humanitarian, temperance leader; Woman of the Bedchamber to Queen Victoria
- Elizabeth Bigler (1809–1873), First Lady of California
- Elizabeth Bloxham (1877–1962), Irish feminist and suffragist
- Elisabeth Blunschy (1922–2015), Swiss politician
- Elizabeth Bobo (born 1943), American politician
- Elizabeth Bodine (1898–1986), American humanitarian
- Élisabeth Borne (born 1961), French politician and Prime Minister of France
- Élisabeth Bouissonade (died 1647), French servant who led a women's uprising
- Elizabeth Bouvia (born c. 1958), American right-to-die activist
- Elisabeth Bowes, Australian diplomat
- Elizabeth Brater (born 1951), American politician
- Elizabeth Brentnall (1830–1909), Australian suffragist and philanthropist
- Élisabeth Brière, Canadian politician
- Elizabeth Britomarte James (1867–1943), Australian political reformer
- Elizabeth Childress Brown (1842–1919), American civic leader, First Lady of Tennessee, President General of the United Daughters of the Confederacy
- Elizabeth Buffum Chace (1806–1899), American anti-slavery, women's rights, and prison reform activist
- Elizabeth Burrows, American politician from Vermont
- Elizabeth Cabezas (born 1963), Ecuadorian politician
- Elizabeth Cadbury (1858–1951) British activist, politician and philanthropist
- Elizabeth Calabrese, American Democratic Party politician
- Elizabeth Campos (born 1969), Texan Legislator
- Elizabeth Caradus (1832–1912), New Zealand suffragist, temperance and welfare worker
- Elizabeth Carriere, British diplomat and civil servant
- Elizabeth Chryst (born 1959), American political strategist
- Elizabeth Cervantes Barron (1938–2020), American politician
- Elizabeth Connelly (1928–2006), American politician
- Elizabeth Brownrigg Henderson Cotten (1875–1975), American suffragist
- Elizabeth Couchman (1876–1982), Australian politician
- Elizabeth Coulson (born 1954), American politician
- Elizabeth Cosson (born 1958), Australian public servant
- Elizabeth Crowley (born 1977), American politician
- Elizabeth Crowley (Rhode Island politician) (born 1951), American politician
- Elizabeth Cull (born 1952), Canadian politician
- Élisabeth Degryse (born 1980), Belgian politician
- Elisabeth Dieringer-Granza (born 1974), Austrian politician
- Elisabeth Dmitrieff (1850–c. 1919), Russian revolutionary and feminist activist
- Élisabeth Doineau (born 1961), French politician
- Elisabeth Domitien (c. 1925–2005), Central African politician
- Elizabeth Ann Doody Gorman (born 1968), American politician
- Elizabeth Henry Haywood Dudley (1796–1840), American political hostess
- Elizabeth Dunne (born 1956), Irish Supreme Court judge
- Elizabeth Ebosele, Nigerian public administrator
- Elizabeth Eggleston (1934–1976), Australian Indigenous rights activist
- Elizabeth Eilor, Ugandan women's rights activist
- Elizabeth Eisenstein (1923–2016), American historian
- Elizabeth Elstob (1683–1756), English linguist and feminist
- Elizabeth Embry (born 1977), American politician
- Elisabeth Enger (born 1958), Norwegian civil servant
- Elisabeth Epps, American politician
- Elizabeth Esty (born 1959), American politician
- Elizabeth Hawley Everett (1857–1940), American clubwoman, suffragist, author, magazine founder/editor, school principal, superintendent of schools
- Elisabeth Falkhaven (born 1955), Swedish politician
- Elisabeth Fanghol (born 1983), Norwegian politician
- Elizabeth Farians (1923–2013), American religious studies scholar, activist and feminist
- Elisabeth Feichtinger (born 1987), Austrian politician
- Elizabeth Fell (1940–2020), Australian activist, journalist, academic, feminist and public intellectual
- Elizabeth Fetterhoff (born 1981), American politician from Florida
- Elisabet Fidjestøl (1922–2013), Norwegian politician
- Elizabeth Fiedler (born 1980), American politician
- Elizabeth Filkin (born 1940), British civil servant
- Elisabeth Fleetwood (1927–2024), Swedish politician
- Elizabeth Gurley Flynn (1890–1964), American labor leader and feminist
- Elizabeth Fouse (1875–1952), American activist
- Elizabeth Fry (1780–1845), English prison reformer
- Elizabeth Fulton Hester (1839–1929), American suffragette
- Elizabeth Furse (1936–2021), American politician
- Elizabeth Finlayson Gauld (c. 1863 – 1941), Scottish suffrage campaigner
- Elizabeth Gawrie, Rojava politician
- Elizabeth Neall Gay (1819–1907), American abolitionist
- Elisabeth Geday (born 1965), Danish politician
- Elisabeth Gehrer (born 1942), Austrian politician
- Elizabeth V. Gillette (1872–1965), American physician and politician
- Elisabeth Gilman (1867–1950), American socialist and civil liberties advocate
- Elizabeth Gilmer (1880–1960), New Zealand horticulturalist and activist
- Elizabeth Glaser (1947–1994), American AIDS activist and child advocate
- Elizabeth Gómez Alcorta (born 1972), Argentine lawyer, professor and politician
- Elizabeth Grace (born 1961), Australian politician
- Elisabeth Griffith, American historian, educator, and activist
- Elisabeth Grossmann (born 1968), Austrian politician
- Elizabeth Grosz (born 1952), Australian feminist theorist
- Elisabeth Grundtvig, Danish women’s rights activist
- Élisabeth Guigou (born 1946), French politician
- Elizabeth Komikie Gumede (1921–2016), South African anti-apartheid activist
- Elizabeth Guzmán, American politician
- Elisabeth Gyllenstierna (1581–1646), Swedish court official
- Elizabeth Hanan (1937–2024), New Zealand local-body politician
- Elizabeth Hanniford (1909–1977), American politician
- Elizabeth Rose Hanretty (1881–1967), Australian politician
- Elizabeth Hanson, Canadian politician
- Elizabeth Harden Gilmore (1909–1986), American activist
- Elizabeth Ya Eli Harding (born 1956), Gambian diplomat
- Elizabeth K. Hartline (1909–2001), American environmental activist
- Elizabeth S. Hartwell (1924–2000), American conservationist
- Elizabeth Harvey (born 1946), Australian politician
- Elisabeth Hattemer (1870–1948), German politician
- Elizabeth Hawley Gasque (1886–1989), American politician
- Elisabeth Heiss (born 1978), Austrian politician
- Elizabeth Helgelien (born 1983), American politician
- Elizabeth Anna Hendrickson (1884–1946), Afro-American civil right and political activist
- Elisabeth Hermsen (1895–1980), Dutch nurse and resistance fighter
- Elizabeth Heyrick (1769–1831), English abolitionist
- Elizabeth Hindson, the first aboriginal person as a member of the national Bahá'í governing body of Australia
- Elizabeth Holland (died 1547/8), 16th-century English political figure
- Elizabeth Holtzman (born 1941), American politician
- Elisabeth Hoodless (born 1941), British humanitarian
- Elizabeth Horsell (1798–1874), English vegetarianism and teetotalism activist
- Elizabeth K. Horst, American diplomat
- Elizabeth Howlett (born 1938), British politician
- Elizabeth Janzen Dreger (1917–1979), Canadian politician and businesswoman
- Elisabeth Jeggle (born 1947), German politician
- Elisabeth Johansen (1907–1993), Greenlandic midwife and politician
- Elisabeth Kaiser (born 1987), German politician
- Elizabeth Keckley (1818–1907), American inventor, activist, professional dressmaker and writer
- Elizabeth Kee (1895–1975), American politician
- Elizabeth Kennett (born 1964), American politician
- Elizabeth Kerekere, New Zealand academic and politician
- Elizabeth Khaxas (born 1960), Namibian feminist
- Elizabeth Kikkert (born 1980), Australian politician
- Elisabeth Kirkby (1921–2026), Australian politician
- Elisabeth Kopp (1936–2023), Swiss politician
- Elisabeth Köstinger (born 1978), Austrian politician
- Elisabeth Krey-Lange, Swedish journalist and women’s rights activist
- Elizabeth Kucinich (born 1977), British activist
- Elisabeth Kula, German politician
- Elizabeth Kyazike is a Ugandan archaeologist and cultural heritage researcher
- Élisabeth Lamure (born 1947), French politician
- Elisabeth Lardelli (1921–2008), Swiss lawyer and politician
- Élizabeth Larouche (born 1953), Canadian politician
- Elizabeth Ammons Larsen (1893–1990), American First Lady of American Samoa and First Lady of Guam
- Élisabeth Laurin (born 1952), French diplomat
- Elizabeth Lehman Belen (1886–1975), American politician
- Elizabeth Lidgett (1843–1919), British poor law guardian and suffragist
- Elizabeth Lockman, American politician
- Elisabeth Lovrek (born 1958), Austrian jurist and incumbent President of the Supreme Court of Justice
- Élisabeth de Maistre (born 1975), French politician
- Elizabeth Malleson (1828–1916), English educationist, suffragist and activist
- Elizabeth Eunice Marcy (1821–1911), American author, activist, and social reformer
- Elisabeth Margue (born 1990), Luxembourgish politician
- Elizabeth Vargas Martín (born 1957), Mexican politician
- Elizabeth May (born 1954), Canadian politician
- Elizabeth Mayo (1793–1865), English educational reformer and evangelical writer
- Elizabeth McAlister (born 1939), American peace activist and former nun
- Elizabeth McCombs (1873–1935), New Zealand politician
- Elizabeth McCracken (Irish writer) (c. 1871–1944), Irish Union suffragette and author
- Elizabeth McDermott, British mental health inequality researcher
- Elizabeth McIngvale, American activist
- Elizabeth McMaster (1847–1903), Canadian humanitarian
- Elisabeth Mengel-Stähle (born 1982), German politician
- Elizabeth Metayer (1911–1998), American politician
- Elisabeth I. Millard, American diplomat
- Elizabeth Maria Molteno (1852–1927), South African-British activist
- Elizabeth Monk (1898–1980), Canadian lawyer and city councillor
- Elizabeth Monroe Boggs (1913–1996), American policy maker, scholar and advocate for people with developmental disabilities
- Elizabeth Montagu (1718–1776), English social reformer and arts patron
- Élisabeth Morin (born 1947), French politician
- Elisabeth Motschmann (born 1952), German politician
- Elisabeth Mukamana, Rwandan politician
- Elisabeth Worth Muller (1862–1952), American suffragist
- Elizabeth Munnerlyn (born 1969), American politician
- Elizabeth Maher Muoio, American politician
- Elizabeth Muyovwe (1956–2021), Zambian Supreme Court Justice
- Elisabeth Røbekk Nørve (born 1951), Norwegian politician
- Elizabeth Nyström (1942–2016), Swedish politician
- Elizabeth Ogbaga, Nigerian lawyer and politician
- Elizabeth Ongoro, Kenyan politician
- Elizabeth Ordway (1828–1897), advocate for women's suffrage
- Elizabeth Lewis Otey (1880–1974), American economist and suffragist
- Elizabeth Margaret Pace (1866–1957), Scottish physician and suffragette
- Elizabeth Eyre Pellet (1887–1976), Colorado state legislator
- Élisabeth Pochon (born 1955), French politician
- Elisabeth Post (born 1965), Dutch politician
- Elisabeth Prass, Canadian politician
- Elizabeth Quat (born 1967), Hong Kong politician
- Elizabeth Raspolic (1939–2022), American diplomat
- Elisabeth Rehn (born 1935), Finnish politician and diplomat
- Élisabeth Renaud (1846–1932), French teacher, social activist and feminist
- Elizabeth Rennick (1833–1923), British born Australian suffragist
- Elisabeth Thand Ringqvist (born 1972), Swedish politician
- Elizabeth Ritter (born 1951), American politician
- Elisabeth Röhl (1888–1930), German politician
- Elizabeth Rowley, Canadian Leader of the Communist Party
- Elizabeth Roy, Canadian politician
- Elisabeth Sabaditsch-Wolff (born 1971), Austrian diplomat and activist
- Elizabeth Salamatu Forgor, Ghanaian diplomat
- Elizabeth Salguero (born 1964), Bolivian minister of Cultures
- Elisabeth Scharfenberg (born 1963), German politician
- Elisabeth Scheucher-Pichler (born 1954), Austrian politician
- Elizabeth Schmitz (1938–2024), Dutch politician
- Elizabeth Schneider, American politician
- Elisabeth Schneider-Schneiter (born 1964), Swiss politician
- Elisabeth Schroedter (born 1959), German politician
- Elisabeth Schwarzhaupt (1901–1986), German politician
- Elisabeth Schweigaard Selmer (1923–2009), Norwegian jurist and politician
- Elizabeth Shepard (1899–1992), American politician
- Elizabeth Shields (born 1928), British politician
- Elisabeth Sickl (born 1940), Austrian politician
- Elizabeth Smith-McCrossin (born 1969), Canadian politician
- Elizabeth Simbiwa Sogbo-Tortu, Sierra Leonean woman barred from her bid to become Paramount Chief
- Elisabeth Steiner, Austrian jurist
- Elizabeth Steiner (born 1963), American politician
- Elizabeth Sumner (1851–1911), Hawaiian high chiefess
- Elisabeth Svantesson (born 1967), Swedish politician
- Elisabeth Svendsen (1930–2011), British animal rights activist
- Elisabeth Tamm (1880–1958), Swedish politician and women’s rights activist
- Elizabeth M. Tamposi (born 1955), American politician and diplomat
- Elisabeth Tankeu (1944–2011), Cameroonian politician
- Elizabeth Tate, civil rights advocate during the Civil Rights Movement
- Elizabeth Thabethe (1959–2021), South African politician
- Elizabeth Theiss-Morse (born 1960), American political scientist
- Elisabeth Tichy-Fisslberger, Austrian lawyer and diplomat
- Elisabeth Tigerstedt-Tähtelä, Finnish diplomat
- Elizabeth Richards Tilton (1834–1897), American suffragist and editor
- Élisabeth Toutut-Picard (born 1954), French politician
- Elisabeth Tuijnman (born 1943), Dutch politician
- Elisabeth Udolf-Strobl (born 1956), Austrian civil servant
- Elizabeth Vallance (1945–2020), British philosopher and policy maker
- Elizabeth Velasco, Mexican-born American politician
- Elizabeth Rosa Vélez, Puerto Rican politician
- Elisabeth Walaas (born 1956), Norwegian civil servant, diplomat and politician
- Elizabeth Erin Walsh, American government official
- Elizabeth Walters, American politician and Chair of the Ohio Democratic Party
- Elisabeth Winkelmeier-Becker (born 1962), German politician
- Elizabeth Yáñez Robles (born 1945), Mexican politician
- Elizabeth Yeampierre, American attorney and environmental activist
- Elizabeth Zelinski, American gerontologist
- Elizabeth Zetzel (1907–1970), American physician
- Elisabeth Zillken (1888–1980), German politician

=== Businesswomen ===
- Elizabeth Arden (1881–1966), American businesswoman
- Elizabeth Arhin, Ghanaian executive
- Elisabeth Baulacre (1613–1693), Genevan businessperson
- Elizabeth Beecroft (1748–1812), English iron manufacturer and butter seller
- Elizabeth Bertrand (1760–1827), Anishinaabe fur trader and leader
- Elizabeth Birch (born 1956), American lawyer and businesswoman
- Elizabeth Christ Trump (1880–1966), German-American businesswoman and grandmother to Donald Trump
- Elisabeth Coste (1748–1794), French cloth merchant and resistor
- Elizabeth Cuthrell, American film producer and co-founder of Evenstar Films
- Elizabeth Davenport McKune (born 1947), American diplomat
- Elisabeth Delatour Préval, Haitian businesswoman and economist
- Elisabeth DeMarse, American businessperson
- Elisabeth Dieudonné Vincent, 19th-century Haitian free woman of colour
- Elizabeth Dilling (1894–1966), American writer and political activist
- Elizabeth Dole (born 1936), American politician and writer
- Elizabeth Ann Doody Gorman (born 1968), American politician
- Elizabeth Dowdeswell (born 1944), lieutenant governor of Ontario
- Elizabeth Dreaver (1848–1934), milliner and Draper in Dunedin, New Zealand
- Elizabeth Elting (born 1966), American businesswoman
- Elisabeth Feller (1910–1973), Swiss entrepreneur and patron
- Elizabeth Filippouli, Greek journalist-turned-entrepreneur, founder of the international non-profit think tank Global Thinkers Forum
- Elizabeth Gaines, Western Australian businesswoman
- Elizabeth A. Gloucester (1817–1883), American businesswoman
- Elisabeth Götze (born 1966), member of the National Council of Austria
- Elisabeth Grieg (born 1959), Norwegian businessperson
- Elizabeth Grierson (c. 1790 – 1847), Native American Muscogee plantation owner and businesswoman
- Elisabeth Gürtler (born 1950), Austrian businesswoman
- Elizabeth Handley-Seymour (1867–1948), British fashion designer
- Elizabeth Hargrave, American game designer
- Elizabeth Janzen Dreger (1917–1979), Canadian politician and businesswoman
- Elizabeth Kirkeby, English merchant
- Elizabeth Littlefield, American businesswoman and executive
- Elizabeth Macarthur (1766–1850), English-born landowner and businesswoman
- Elizabeth Mallet (fl. 1672–1706), English printer and bookseller
- Élisabeth Moreno (born 1970), French—Cape Verdean businesswoman
- Elizabeth Peck Perkins (1735–1807), American shipping magnate
- Elisabeth de Ranfaing (1592–1649), French founder of the Order of Refuge
- Elisabeth Rivers-Bulkeley (1924–2006), Austrian stockbroker
- Elizabeth Sinclair (1800–1892), British farmer and plantation owner in New Zealand and Hawaii
- Elisabeth Valerio, Zimbabwean businesswoman and politician
- Elizabeth Wiatt, American businesswoman
- Elizabeth Wyns-Dogbe, Ghanaian chartered insurer
- Elizabeth Xu, American Chinese business and technical leader

=== Educators ===
- Elizabeth Cabot Agassiz (1822–1907), American educator and illustrator of natural history texts
- Elizabeth Ammons (born 1943), American literary scholar
- Elisabeth Anthony Dexter, American social historian
- Elizabeth Anyakoha (born 1948), professor of home economics education in Nigeria
- Élisabeth Badinter (born 1944), French philosopher, author and historian
- Elizabeth R. Baer (born 1946), American academic
- Elizabeth Bannan (1909–1977), Australian educationist interested in the use of radio in school tuition
- Elizabeth Barnes, American philosopher
- Elizabeth Bartholet, American academic
- Elisabeth Beck-Gernsheim (1946–2025), German sociologist and scholar
- Elizabeth Bernstein (born 1968), American sociologist
- Elizabeth Binmore (1860–1917), Canadian educationist
- Elisabeth Blochmann (1892–1972), German academics
- Elisabeth Blomqvist (1827–1901), Finnish educator
- Elizabeth Lee Bloomstein (1859–1927), American historian
- Elizabeth Boa, British scholar of German literature
- Élisabeth Bouscaren, French mathematician
- Elizabeth Brake, American philosopher
- Elisabeth Bronfen (born 1958), German specialist
- Elizabeth Burgwin (1850–1940), headteacher and found of charity supplying free school meals in London
- Elizabeth Burmaster (born 1954), American educator and principal
- Elisabeth Busse-Wilson (1890–1974), German historian
- Elisabeth Camp, American philosopher
- Elizabeth Caskey (1910–1994), Canadian-American classical scholar and professor
- Elizabeth S. Chilton, American academic
- Elizabeth Millicent Chilver (1914–2014), British educator
- Elisabeth S. Clemens, American sociologist
- Elizabeth Couper-Kuhlen, American linguist
- Elizabeth Coxen (1825–1906), Australian museum curator, meteorologist and specimen collector
- Elizabeth Craik (born 1939), Scottish classical scholar
- Elizabeth Cripps, British political philosopher
- Elisabeth Croll (1944–2007), New Zealand anthropologist
- Elisabeth Crouzet-Pavan, French historian and teacher
- Elizabeth Cullingford, American scholar
- Elisabeth Joan Doyle (1922–2009), American historian
- Élisabeth Du Réau (1937–2021), French historian and professor
- Elisabeth Engberg-Pedersen (born 1952), Danish linguist and professor
- Elisabeth Erke (born 1962), Norwegian Sami educator and politician
- Elizabeth Fennema (1928–2021), American educator specializing in the teaching of mathematics
- Élisabeth de Feydeau (born 1966), French historian and writer
- Elizabeth Fish (1860–1944), Scottish teacher, and the first elected woman president of the Educational Institute of Scotland
- Elizabeth Foulis (1746–1827), Scottish library benefactor
- Elisabeth Freund (1898–1982), German-Jewish educator and writer
- Elizabeth Futas (1944–1995), American librarian
- Elizabeth Wells Gallup (1848–1934), American educator and philosopher
- Élisabeth Gassiat, French mathematical statistician
- Elisabeth Gerle (born 1951), Swedish ethicist
- Elizabeth Goodfellow (c. 1767–1851), American cooking teacher
- Elisabeth Gössmann (1928–2019), German Roman Catholic theologian
- Elisabeth Gottschalk (1912–1989), Dutch historical geographer
- Elizabeth Gregory (1901–1983), university professor of home science
- Elisabeth Griffith, American historian, author and educator
- Elisabeth Hoemberg (1909–1994), Canadian historian and writer
- Elizabeth Horrell (1826–1913), New Zealand teacher and homemaker
- Elisabeth van Houts (born 1952), Dutch-British historian
- Elisabeth Howen (1834–1923), Estonian pedagogue
- Elizabeth Huckaby (1905–1999), American educator
- Elisabeth Irwin (1880–1942), American academic
- Elisabeth Jaquette, American translator
- Elisabeth Joris (born 1946), Swiss historian
- Elisabeth Kendall, British Arabist
- Elisabeth Labrousse (1914–2000), French philosopher, historian and academic
- Elizabeth "Betty" Lacey (1950–2012), American educator and community advocate
- Elisabeth Langgässer (1899–1950), German author and teacher
- Elisabeth Leinfellner (1938–2010), Austrian linguist
- Elisabeth Lemke (1849–1925), German historian
- Elizabeth Llewellyn-Smith (born 1934), British academic administrator
- Elisabeth Long, American librarian, book artist and academic administrator
- Élisabeth Lutz (1914–2008), French mathematician
- Elisabeth Marbury (1856–1933), American literary and talent agent; translator
- Elisabeth Maxwell (1921–2013), Anglo-French historical researcher
- Elisabeth McDonald, New Zealand feminist law academic
- Elizabeth Moir, Sri Lankan educationalist
- Elizabeth Homer Morton (1903–1977), Canadian librarian
- Elisabeth Munksgaard (1924–1997), Danish historian
- Elizabeth Nesbitt (1897–1977), American children's librarian and a library science educator
- Elisabeth Niggemann (born 1954), German librarian
- Elizabeth Helm Nitchie, American educator and expert on lip reading
- Elizabeth Ntege, Ugandan engineer and educator
- Elizabeth Orr (1929–2021), New Zealand lecturer and university chancellor
- Elisabeth Oswald, Austrian cryptographer
- Elizabeth Parish (c. 1740/41 –1823, Swiss-born English governess and lady's companion
- Elizabeth Peet (1874–1961), American educator and lecturer
- Elisabeth Piirainen (1943–2017), German linguist
- Elizabeth Pilant (1905–1987), American educational psychologist and folklorist
- Élisabeth Platel (born 1959), French prima ballerina
- Elizabeth Povinelli (born 1962), professor of Anthropology and Gender Studies
- Élisabeth Roudinesco (born 1944), French historian
- Elisabeth Ruttkay (1926–2009), Hungarian archaeologist and prehistorian
- Elisabeth Samsonov, Austrian philosopher
- Elisabeth Schellekens, Swedish philosopher
- Elisabeth Selkirk, American linguist
- Elisabeth Sikes, American geoscientist and academic
- Elisabeth Tournier-Lasserve, French neurologist, medical geneticist and university professor
- Elisabeth M. Werner, American mathematician
- Elizabeth H. West (1873–1948), American librarian
- Elisabeth Whittle, Welsh garden historian
- Elizabeth Wordsworth (1840–1932), founding principal of Lady Margaret Hall, Oxford
- Elizabeth Yakel, archivist, researcher and educator in information science
- Elizabeth Yeats (1868–1940), Irish educator and publisher
- Elizabeth Ziegler (1854–1942), Canadian educator and principal

=== Military ===
- Elisabeth Becker (1923–1946), German concentration camp guard
- Élisabeth Boselli (1914–2005), French fighter pilot
- Elizabeth Burgin (1760–1787), American patriot during the American Revolutionary War
- Elizabeth Choy (1910–2006), Singaporean educator and war heroine
- Elizabeth Craig-McFeely (born 1927), British Director of the Women's Royal Naval Service
- Elizabeth Depelsenaire (1913–1998), Belgian spy
- Elisabeth Friske, first female West German airline pilot
- Elizabeth Godwin, British army officer
- Elisabeth Hasse, Nazi guard at Auschwitz
- Elizabeth P. Hoisington (1918–2007), United States Army officer
- Elizabeth Carraway Howland, Confederate spy during the American Civil War
- Elizabeth Jacobson (1984–2005), United States Air Force airwoman
- Elizabeth Kimber, CIA director and corporate executive
- Elisabeth Le Port, French resistance fighter from Tours
- Élisabeth Lion (1904–1998), French aviator
- Elizabeth A. Niles (1842–1920), Union soldier during American Civil War
- Elisabeth Sveri (1927–2018), Norwegian army officer
- Elisabeth Volkenrath (1919–1945), Nazi concentration camp supervisor

=== Musicians ===
- Elisabeth Andreassen (born 1958), Norwegian-Swedish singer
- Elizabeth Atherton, British lyric soprano
- Elizabeth Ayoub, Venezuelan musical artist of Lebanese descent
- Elizabeth Bainbridge (born 1930), British opera singer
- Elizabeth Bannister (1757–1849), British actress and singer
- Elizabeth Barraclough, American folk, country, rock and pop musician
- Elizabeth Billington (1765–1818), British opera singer
- Elisabeth Boisen (1850–1919), Danish composer
- Élisabeth Brasseur (1896–1972), French choral conductor
- Elisabeth Brauss, German pianist
- Elisabeth Breul (1930–2016), German opera singer and singing teacher
- Elizabeth Caballero (born 1974), Cuban-American lyric soprano
- Elisabeth Caland (1862–1929), German woman pianist
- Elisabeth Carew (born 1985), Norwegian singer and songwriter
- Elisabeth Carlisle-Hollenbeck (born 1963), American singer-songwriter
- Elisabeth Carron (1922–2016), American operatic soprano
- Elisabeth Chojnacka (1939–2017), Polish harpsichordist
- Elizabeth Clephane (1830–1869), Scottish songwriter
- Elizabeth Connell (1946–2012), South African-born opera singer
- Elizabeth Cosnett (1936–2024), British hymnodist
- Elizabeth Cronin (1879–1956), Irish singer
- Elizabeth Crotty (1885–1960), Irish musical artist
- Elizabeth de la Porte (1941–2020), British musician
- Elisabeth Dons (1864–1942), Danish operatic mezzo-soprano
- Elizabeth Drake, Australian film soundtrack composer
- Élisabeth Duparc, French opera singer
- Elizabeth Fetzer Bates (1909–1999), American musician
- Elisabeth Forsselius (1771–1850), Swedish opera singer
- Elizabeth Futral (born 1963), American soprano
- Elizabeth Garrett (songwriter) (1885–1947), American songwriter
- Elizabeth Gilels (1919–2008), Soviet and Russian violinist
- Elisabeth Glauser (born 1943), Swiss opera singer
- Elizabeth Greenfield (1809–1876), American singer
- Elisabeth Grümmer (1911–1986), German soprano
- Élisabeth Jacquet de La Guerre (1665–1729), French musician, harpsichordist and composer
- Elizabeth Gyring (1906–1970), American composer
- Elizabeth Joanetta Catherine von Hagen (1750–1809), American classical composer
- Elizabeth Mae "Lzzy" Hale (born 1983), American musician, singer, songwriter. Lead singer and rhythm guitarist for Halestorm
- Elizabeth Hardin (1750–1780), English composer and organist
- Elizabeth Harwood (1938–1990), British opera singer
- Élisabeth de Haulteterre, French composer and violinist
- Elizabeth Hayden Pizer (born 1954), American classical composer
- Elisabeth Hermans, Belgian soprano
- Elisabeth Höngen (1906–1997), German opera singer
- Elizabeth Hudson, musicologist and professor in America and New Zealand
- Elisabeth Janda, Bohemian musician
- Elisabeth Jordán (born 1983), Spanish singer
- Elisabeth Klein (1911–2004), Hungarian-born Danish classical pianist
- Elisabeth Kohut-Mannstein (1843–1926), German operatic soprano
- Elisabeth Kontomanou (born 1961), French jazz singer and composer
- Elisabeth Kulman (born 1973), Austrian classical singer
- Elisabeth Kuyper (1877–1953), Dutch composer and conductor
- Elisabeth Kværne (1953–2024), Norwegian musician
- Elizabeth Larner (1932–2022), British actress and singer
- Elizabeth Laurence (born 1949), British opera singer
- Elisabeth Le Guin, American musicologist and cellist
- Elisabeth Leisinger (1864–1913), German opera singer
- Elizabeth Lennox (1894–1992), American contralto
- Elisabeth Leonskaja (born 1945), Russian-Austrian pianist
- Elisabeth Lillström (c. 1717–1791), Swedish opera singer
- Elisabeth Lindermeier (1923–1998), German operatic soprano
- Elizabeth Ann Linley (1754–1792), English singer
- Elizabeth Llewellyn, British opera singer
- Elisabeth Lutyens (1906–1983), English composer
- Elizabeth Maconchy (1907–1994), Irish-English composer
- Elisabeth von Magnus (born 1954), Austrian classical mezzo-soprano
- Elizabeth Mannion, American operatic mezzo-soprano
- Elizabeth Norman McKay (1931–2018), English musicologist, pianist and Lieder accompanist
- Elizabeth Moen, American singer-songwriter
- Elizabeth Mounsey (1819–1905), British organist, guitarist and composer
- Elizabeth Nickell-Lean (1908–1986), British opera singer and actor
- Elizabeth Norberg-Schulz (born 1959), Norwegian-Italian operatic soprano
- Elizabeth Ogonek (born 1989), American classical composer
- Elisabeth Olin (1740–1828), Swedish opera singer
- Elizabeth Parcells (1951–2005), American coloratura soprano
- Elisabeth Popien, German alto singer
- Elizabeth Raum (born 1945), Canadian oboist and composer
- Elizabeth Reiter, American soprano
- Elisabeth Rethberg (1894–1976), German opera singer
- Elisabeth Röckel (1793–1883), German opera singer
- Elizabeth Sandunova (1772–1826), Russian opera singer
- Elizabeth Sankey, British filmmaker and musician in the indie-pop band Summer Camp
- Elisabeth Schärtel (1919–2012), German mezzo-soprano and contralto
- Elisabeth Schmierer, German musicologist
- Elisabeth Scholl, German soprano and academic teacher
- Elizabeth Schultz Rigg (1921–2001), American singer and pianist
- Elisabeth Schumann (1888–1952), German soprano
- Elizabeth Schwartz, American vocalist of klezmer music and the Romanian Yiddish dialect
- Elisabeth Schwarzenberg (1933–2004), German operatic soprano
- Elisabeth Schwarzkopf (1915–2006), German-born opera soprano
- Elisabeth Sobotka (born 1965), Austrian woman opera director
- Elisabeth Söderström (1927–2009), Swedish soprano
- Elizabeth Sombart (born 1958), French pianist
- Elisabeth Speiser (born 1940), Swiss operatic soprano
- Elisabeth von Trapp (born 1955), American folk singer
- Elisabeth Lid Trøen (born 1992), Norwegian jazz saxophonist and composer
- Elisabeth Troy, British singer and songwriter
- Elizabeth Anka Vajagic, Canadian singer and guitarist
- Elizabeth Vaughan (born 1937), Welsh opera singer
- Elizabeth Vidal (born 1960), French operatic coloratura soprano
- Elisabeth Waldo (1918–2026), American violinist
- Elisabeth Waterhouse (born 1933), English pianist and music pedagogue
- Elisabeth Wendling (1746–1786), German operatic soprano
- Elisabeth Westenholz, Danish pianist and organist
- Elisabeth Wintzer, German composer
- Elisabeth Withers (born 1970), American singer
- Elizabeth Zharoff (born 1986), American opera singer and YouTuber

=== Scientists ===
- Elizabeth von Hauff (born 1977), Canadian physicist
- Elizabeth C. Addoms (1905–1983), American physical therapist
- Elizabeth Adkins-Regan (born 1945), American neuroendocrinologist
- Elizabeth Alkin (c. 1600 – 1655), English nurse and Parliamentarian spy
- Elizabeth Allgeier (1941–2016), American psychologist and sexologist
- Elizabeth S. Allman (born 1965), American mathematician
- Elizabeth Altmaier (born 1952), academic counseling psychologist
- Elizabeth Garrett Anderson (1836–1917), English physician, doctor and feminist
- Elisabeth André, German computer scientist
- Elizabeth Anionwu (born 1947), British nurse, professor and activist
- Elizabeth Asiedu, Ghanaian economist
- Elizabeth Emerson Atwater (1812–1878), naturalist, botanist and botanical collector
- Elizabeth Abimbola Awoliyi (1910–1971), Nigerian physician
- Elizabeth Bagshaw (1881–1982), Canadian doctor
- Elizabeth Bailey (1938–2022), American economist
- Elizabeth Baldwin Garland (1930–2020), American archaeologist
- Elizabeth Bang (born 1942), New Zealand nurse and chief executive
- Elizabeth Baranger (1927–2019), American physicist and academic administrator
- Elisabeth Bardwell (1831–1899), American astronomer
- Elizabeth A. Barnes, American climate scientist
- Elizabeth Ann Bartholomew (1912–1985), American botanist
- Elizabeth Bass (1876–1956), American physician
- Elizabeth Bates (1947–2003), American cognitive scientist
- Elizabeth Wayland Barber (born 1940), American textile archaeologist
- Elizabeth Beach Keller (1918–1997), American biochemist
- Elizabeth Beckley (c. 1846–1927), British astronomical photographer
- Elizabeth Beise, American professor of physics
- Elizabeth Belding, computer scientist
- Elizabeth Bertram (1874–1954), Scottish nursing sister
- Elizabeth Bielby, British physician and medical missionary
- Elisabeth Bik (born 1966), Dutch microbiologist
- Elisabeth Binder, Austrian psychiatrist
- Elisabeth Bing (1914–2015), American physical therapist
- Elizabeth Bixler Torrey (1899–1976), American nurse
- Elizabeth Blackburn (born 1948), Australian-born American biological researcher
- Elizabeth Blanton (born 1970), American astronomer
- Elizabeth Pierce Blegen (1888–1966), American archaeologist
- Elizabeth Borer, American ecologist
- Elisabeth Bormann (1895–1986), Austrian physicist
- Elisabeth Boyko (1892–1985), Austrian-Israeli botanist
- Elizabeth Bragg (1858–1929), American civil engineer
- Elizabeth L. Brainerd (born 1963), American biologist
- Elizabeth M. Bright (1893–1975), American physiologist
- Elizabeth Gertrude Britton (1858–1934), American botanist
- Elizabeth Broadbent, New Zealand health psychologist
- Elizabeth Brumfiel (1945–2012), American archaeologist
- Elizabeth Brunner (1920–1983), British economist
- Elizabeth B. Bryant (1875–1953), American archaeologist
- Elizabeth Bugie (1920–2001), American biochemist
- Elizabeth Bunce (1915–2003), American geophysicist
- Elisabeth Burger (1923–2013), American economist
- Elizabeth Burgos (born 1941), Venezuelan anthropologist
- Elizabeth Buckley-Geer, particle physicist and astrophysicist
- Elizabeth A. Buffalo, American physiologist and academic
- Elizabeth Burchill (1904–2003), Australian nurse, philanthropist and author
- Elizabeth K. Cahoon, Georgian-born American biologist
- Elizabeth Cameron, American biodefense expert
- Elizabeth Canuel, American organic geochemist
- Elizabeth Carne (1817–1873), English geologist and writer
- Elizabeth Cascio, American economist
- Elizabeth Chesser (1877–1940), British physician and medical journalist
- Elizabeth F. Churchill (born 1962), psychologist
- Elizabeth Chang, Australian electrical engineer
- Elizabeth Casson (1881–1954), British doctor
- Elizabeth Celi, Australian psychologist and author
- Elizabeth Cellier (born 1650), English midwife
- Elisabeth S. Clemens, American sociologist
- Elizabeth Cobbold (1767–1824), English artist, poet and geologist
- Elizabeth Cochran, seismologist
- Elizabeth Conabere (1929–2009), Australian botanical artist and scientific illustrator
- Elizabeth Connell (doctor) (1925–2018), doctor and proponent of women's reproductive health
- Elizabeth Colson (1917–2016), US social anthropologist
- Elizabeth Cosgriff-Hernandez, American biomedical engineer
- Elizabeth Cottrell (born 1975), American geologist
- Elizabeth Courtauld (1867–1947), British doctor in First World War
- Elizabeth Cuthill (1923–2011), American applied mathematician and analyst
- Elizabeth Cutter (1929–2010), Scottish botanist and professor
- Elizabeth G. Creamer, American researcher
- Elizabeth Croft, Canadian roboticist
- Elizabeth C. Crosby (1888–1983), American neuro-anatomist
- Elizabeth Dale (born 1868), British palaeobotanist and botanist
- Elisabeth Dane (1903–1984), German biochemist
- Elizabeth Dawbarn (died 1839), English nurse and religious writer
- Elisabeth Deichmann (1896–1975), Danish-born American marine biologist
- Elizabeth DeLong, American biostatistician
- Elizabeth Derryberry, American ornithologist
- Elizabeth Dickens (ornithologist) (1877–1963), American ornithologist
- Elizabeth Dickey, American materials scientist
- Elizabeth Delia Dixon-Carroll (1872–1934), American physician
- Elizabeth Donley (born 1970), American physicist
- Elizabeth Donnelly (engineer), British engineer and executive
- Elizabeth R. Douvan (1926–2002), American psychologist
- Elisabeth Drake (1936–2024), American chemical engineer
- Elizabeth Dunn, Canadian social psychologist
- E. C. L. During Caspers (1934–1996), Dutch archaeologist
- Elizabeth Eames (1918–2008), English archaeologist and expert on medieval tiles
- Elizabeth Eaton Morse (1864–1955), American botanist
- Elizabeth Edgar (1929–2019), New Zealand botanist
- Elizabeth Eisenhauer, Canadian oncologist
- Elisabeth Ekman (1862–1936), Swedish botanist
- Elisabeth Lund Engebretsen (born 1973), Norwegian anthropologist
- Elizabeth Engle, professor of neurology and ophthalmology
- Elizabeth Essex-Cohen (1940–2004), Australian physicist
- Elisabeth Ettlinger (1915–2012), Swiss archaeologist
- Elizabeth Exley (1927–2007), Australian entomologist
- Elizabeth J. Feinler (born 1931), American information scientist
- Elizabeth Fentress (born 1948), American archaeologist
- Elizabeth Warnock Fernea (1927–2008), American anthropologist, writer and filmmaker
- Elisabeth Fischer-Friedrich, German biophysicist
- Elizabeth Gault Fisher (1909–2000), U.S. Entomologist, bacteriologist and amateur bryologist
- Elisabeth West FitzHugh (1926–2017), Lebanese-American conservation scientist
- Elizabeth Fleischman (1867–1905), American radiographer
- Elizabeth Fontham, American epidemiologist
- Elizabeth Warham Forster (1886–1972), American nurse
- Elizabeth Foxcroft (1600–1679), English theosophist
- Elizabeth French (1931–2021), British archaeologist
- Elizabeth Fulhame (1759–1790), British chemist
- Elizabeth A. Fulton (born 1973), Australian ecosystem modeler
- Elisabeth Gasteiger, Swiss bioinformatician
- Elizabeth Gavis, American biologist
- Elisabeth Geleerd (1909–1969), Dutch-American psychoanalyst
- Elizabeth Georgeson (1895–?), Scottish engineer
- Elizabeth Gerber, American engineer
- Elizabeth Gershoff, American psychologist
- Elizabeth D. Getzoff, American biochemist
- Elisabeth Giacobino (born 1946), French physicist
- Elisabeth Gidengil, Canadian political scientist
- Elizabeth V. Gillette (1874–1965), American physician and politician
- Elizabeth Gilmer (1880–1960), New Zealand horticulturalist and activist
- Elizabeth Gitau (born 1988), Kenyan physician
- Elisabeth Goldschmidt (1912–1970), Israeli geneticist
- Elizabeth Riddle Graves (1916–1972), American nuclear physicist
- Élisabeth Guazzelli (born 1955), French physicist
- Elisabeth Gwinn, American physicist
- Elizabeth Hadly, American professor of biology
- Elizabeth Harry, Australian biologist
- Elizabeth Haswell, American biologist
- Elisabeth Haub (1889–1977), German philanthropist
- Elizabeth Hays, American astrophysicist
- Elizabeth Hayes (1912–1984), American physician
- Elizabeth Herriott (1882–1936), New Zealand scientist and academic
- Elisabeth Hevelius (1647–1693), astronomer from Danzig
- Elizabeth Hillman, British physicist
- Elizabeth Hodgson (1814–1877), botanist
- Elisabeth Holland, American climate scientist
- Elizabeth A. Holm, American materials scientist
- Elizabeth E. Hood, American plant biologist
- Elizabeth Hounsell (1950–2020), British academic and carbohydrate chemist
- Elizabeth Ellis Hoyt (1893–1980), American economist
- Elisabeth Huber-Sannwald, Austrian researcher
- Elizabeth Hurdon, British gynaecologist and pathologist
- Elizabeth Hyatt, American Union nurse and ambulance driver during the American Civil War
- Elizabeth Innes (1921–2015), Scottish haematologist
- Elisabeth Isaksson, Swedish glaciologist and geologist
- Elizabeth Isham (1609–1654), English intellectual, herbalist and diarist
- Elizabeth Itotia (born 1992), Kenyan nuclear physicist
- Elizabeth Jaffee, American oncologist
- Elizabeth James-Perry (born 1973), American artist and restoration ecologist
- Elisabeth Jastrow (1890–1981), German-born classical archaeologist
- Elizabeth Jens (born 1984), Australian propulsion engineer
- Elisabeth Jérémine originally Élisabeth Tchernayev (Russian: Елизавета Владимировна Ерёмина) (1879-1964), Russian French geologist and petrographer
- Elizabeth Jessup, American computer scientist
- Elizabeth Jockusch, American biologist
- Elizabeth Jonas (neurologist), American neurologist
- Elizabeth Loaiza Junca (born 1989), Colombian aviator and model
- Elisabeth Kalko (1962–2011), German tropical scientist and ecologist
- Elizabeth Kane (1836–1909), American physician, writer and philanthropist
- Elizabeth Karlin (1944–1998), American doctor of internal medicine and women's health
- Elizabeth Anne Kellogg (born 1951), American botanist
- Elizabeth Kenny (1880–1952), Australian nurse
- Elizabeth Kensinger, American psychologist and neuroscientist
- Elizabeth Killick (1924–2019), British naval electronics engineer
- Elisabeth von Knobelsdorff (1877–1959), German engineer
- Elizabeth Kozlova (1892–1975), Russian ornithologist
- Elisabeth Krämer-Bannow (1874–1945), German ethnologist
- Elisabeth Krause, German-American astronomer
- Elizabeth Krupinski, professor of medical imaging
- Elisabeth Kübler-Ross (1926–2004), Swiss-American psychiatrist
- Elizabeth Kujawinski, American oceanographer
- Elizabeth Kutter, American phage biologist
- Elizabeth Lack (1916–2015), British ornithologist
- Elisabeth Larsson (1895–1997), Swedish-American obstetrician and gynecologist
- Elisabeth Larsson (scientific computing) (born 1971), Swedish applied mathematician and numerical analyst
- Elizabeth Laverick (1925–2010), British radar and electrical engineer
- Elizabeth Leitman, American meteorologist
- Elizabeth Lepper (1883–1971), British physician
- Elisabeth Lichtenberger (1925–2017), Austrian geographer
- Elizabeth Sherman Lindsay (1885–1954), American landscape architect
- Elisabeth Christina von Linné (1743–1782), Swedish botanist
- Elizabeth G. Loboa, American engineer and academic administrator
- Elizabeth Loftus (born 1944), American cognitive psychologist
- Elizabeth Lomax (1810–1895), English botanist
- Elizabeth Losey (1912–2005), American biologist and environmentalist
- Elisabeth Lukas (born 1942), Austrian psychiatrist
- Elizabeth Teter Lunn, American biologist
- Elisabeth Mann Borgese (1918–2002), Canadian-born German expert in maritime law and ecologist
- Elizabeth Mannshardt, American environmental statistician
- Elizabeth Mansfield (mathematician), Australian mathematician
- Elizabeth Margosches, American statistician
- Elizabeth Nesta Marks (1918–2002), Australian entomologist
- Elizabeth Holloway Marston (1893–1993), American psychologist
- Elisabeth von Matt (1762–1814), Austrian astronomer
- Elizabeth Mayer-Davis, American nutritionist and academic
- Elizabeth Maywood, English chronobiologist
- Elizabeth McClintock (1912–2004), Californian botanist
- Elizabeth McCoy (microbiologist) (1903–1978), American microbiologist
- Elizabeth McGraw, American biologist and academic
- Elizabeth McGregor, Canadian veterinarian
- Elizabeth McHarg (1923–1999), Scottish mathematician
- Elizabeth A. McMahan (1924–2009), American entomologist
- Elizabeth Midlarsky (died 2023), American psychologist
- Elizabeth Murchison, British-Australian geneticist
- Elizabeth Ann Nalley (born 1942), American chemist
- Elizabeth Nance, American chemical engineer
- Elizabeth F. Neufeld (born 1928), French-American geneticist
- Elizabeth Newson (1929–2014), British developmental psychologist
- Elizabeth New (born 1984), Australian chemist
- Elizabeth Niespolo, American geologist
- Elisabeth Noelle-Neumann (1916–2010), German political scientist
- Elizabeth Nolan (born 1978), American biochemist
- Elizabeth Ofili (born 1956), Nigerian-American physician
- Elizabeth O'Hara (medical doctor) (1866–1942), Australian medical doctor
- Elizabeth Opila, American materials scientist
- Elisabeth Pate-Cornell, American engineer
- Elizabeth Patton (1700–1776), fellow of the Royal Society of Edinburgh, professor of chemical genetics
- Elizabeth Pennisi, American science journalist
- Elizabeth Percival (1906–1997), British research chemist
- Elisabeth Peveling (1932–1993), German botanist
- Elisabeth Julienne Pommereul (1733–1782), French botanist
- Elizabeth Press (1920–2008), British immunologist
- Elizabeth Rakoczy, Hungarian-born Australian molecular ophthalmologist
- Elizabeth Rather, American computer scientist
- Elizabeth Rauscher (1937–2019), American physicist and parapsychologist
- Elizabeth Reitz, American zoo archaeologist
- Elizabeth Rhoades, American biophysicist
- Elizabeth Richter, American acting administrator of the Centers for Medicare and Medicaid Services
- Elizabeth Ripper (1909–2004), Australian geologist
- Elisabeth Rohde (1915–2013), German classical archaeologist
- Elizabeth Rona (1890–1981), Hungarian chemist
- Elisabeth Sadoulet, economist
- Elisabeth Schiemann (1881–1972), German geneticist and botanist
- Elisabeth Schmid (c. 1912–1994), German geologist, paleontologist, archaeologist and prehistorian
- Elisabeth Schmitz (1893–1977), German theologian
- Elizabeth Selvin, American diabetes epidemiologist
- Elizabeth Smellie (1884–1968), Canadian nurse
- Elizabeth Soshkina (1889–1963), Soviet geologist and palaeontologist
- Elizabeth Spelke (born 1949), American cognitive scientist
- Elizabeth Spillius (1924–2016), Canadian anthropologist and psychoanalyst
- Elizabeth Stack (1829–1919), New Zealand settler and botanist
- Elizabeth Stasny, expert on survey methodology
- Elizabeth Kilgore Steen (1886–1938), American explorer, social anthropologist
- Elisabeth Ivanovna Steinberg (1884–1963), Russian botanist
- Elizabeth Stephansen (1872–1961), Norwegian mathematician and educator
- Elizabeth Stern (1915–1980), American physician
- Elizabeth Joan Stokes (1912–2010), English bacteriologist
- Elizabeth Tanner (born 1957), British biomedical engineer
- Elisabeth Targ (1961–2002), American psychiatrist
- Elizabeth Tasker, Australian fire ecologist
- Elizabeth C. Theil (born 1936), American biochemist
- Elisabeth Tooker (1927–2005), American anthropologist
- Elizabeth Topp, American pharmaceutical scientist
- Elizabeth Treasure, British dentist
- Elizabeth Trembath-Reichert, astrobiologist and geomicrobiologist
- Elizabeth Mary Troy (1914–2011), obstetrician and Ireland's first female medical consultant
- Elizabeth Truswell (born 1941), Australian palaeontologist
- Elisabeth Tschermak-Woess (1917–2001), Austrian biologist
- Elizabeth Turtle (born 1967), American planetary scientist
- Elizabeth Catherine Usher (1911–1996), Australian speech disorders therapist
- Elizabeth Villa, American biophysicist
- Elizabeth Anne Voigt (1944–2010), South African museologist and zoo archaeologists
- Elizabeth Van Volkenburgh (born 1952) Australian plant scientist
- Elisabeth Vrba (1942–2025), American paleontologist
- Elisabeth Vreede (1879–1943), Dutch scientist
- Elisabeth Walther-Bense, German semiotician
- Elizabeth Warrington (born 1931), British neurologist
- Elizabeth Wayne, biomedical engineer
- Elizabeth Weisburger (1924–2019), American chemist
- Elizabeth Weiss, American anthropologist
- Elisabeth Wells, New Zealand biostatistician
- Elisabeth Wheeler (born 1944), American botanist, biologist and wood scientist
- Elizabeth Lyding Will (1924–2009), American archaeologist
- Elizabeth Williamson, British pharmacist
- Elisabeth Winterhalter (1856–1952), German surgeon
- Elisabeth Wollman (1888–1943), French microbiologist and physicist

=== Writers ===
- Elizabeth Abbott (born 1946), Canadian writer, historian, and animal rights activist
- Elizabeth Abel (born 1945), American literary critic
- Elizabeth Acevedo (born 1988), Dominican American poet and author
- Elizabeth Achtemeier (1926–2002), American ordained Presbyterian minister, bible professor and author
- Elizabeth Adler (born 1950), British author
- Elizabeth Algrávez (born 1972), Mexican poet, translator and editor
- Elizabeth Allston Pringle (1845–1921), American author
- Elizabeth Amber, American novelist
- Elizabeth Ammon, British cricket journalist
- Elizabeth von Arnim (1866–1941), Australian-born English writer
- Elizabeth Barr Arthur (1884–1971), American poet, author, journalist, librarian, and suffragist
- Elisabeth Åsbrink (born 1965), Swedish author and journalist
- Elizabeth Ashbridge (1713–1755), Quaker minister and autobiographer
- Elizabeth Ashurst Biggs (1839–1905), English Victorian-era novelist and activist
- Elisabeth Aspe (1860–1927), Estonian writer
- Elisabeth Augustin (1903–2001), German-Dutch writer
- Elisabeth Axmann (1926–2015), Romanian writer
- Elisabeth Ayrton (1910–1991), British novelist and cookery writer
- Elizabeth Azcona Cranwell (1933–2004), Argentine poet, storyteller, writer, translator and literary critic
- Elizabeth Bachinsky (born 1976), Canadian poet
- Elizabeth Backhouse (1917–2013), Australian novelist, scriptwriter and playwright
- Elizabeth Baron (1910–?), Australian screenwriter
- Elizabeth Barrett Browning (1806–1861), Victorian era poet
- Elizabeth Bath (1776–1844), English poet
- Elizabeth Bear (born 1971), American author
- Elizabeth Becker (born 1947), American author and journalist
- Elizabeth Beecher (1898–1973), American screenwriter
- Elizabeth Benedict, American author
- Elizabeth Benger (1775–1827), English biographer, novelist and poet
- Elizabeth Benjamin, American TV writer and producer
- Elizabeth Benjamin (journalist), American journalist
- Elisabeth Beresford (1926–2010), English children’s author
- Elisabeth Beskow (1870–1928), Swedish writer
- Elizabeth Best, Australian writer
- Elizabeth Bevarly, American writer
- Elizabeth Beverley (1792–1832), English pamphleteer
- Elizabeth Bibesco (1897–1945), English writer and socialite
- Elizabeth Bisland (1861–1929), American writer and journalist
- Elizabeth Blackmar, American historian and author
- Elizabeth Blower (1763–1820), English writer and actress
- Elizabeth Bogart (1795–1879), American author and poet
- Elizabeth Borton de Treviño (1904–2001), American writer
- Elizabeth Joanna Bosman (1894–1963), South African author, first Afrikaner novelist published in English
- Elizabeth Bonhôte (1744–1818), English novelist, essayist and host
- Elisabeth Borchers (1926–2013), German writer and poet
- Elizabeth Bowen (1899–1973), Irish writer
- Elisabeth Bowers (born 1949), Canadian writer
- Elizabeth Boyd (fl. 1727–1745), English writer and poet
- Elizabeth Brackett (1941–2018), American journalist
- Elizabeth Bradfield, American poet
- Elizabeth Brewster (1922–2012), Canadian poet
- Elizabeth Bruenig (born 1990), American writer and opinion columnist for The New York Times
- Elisabeth Bumiller (born 1956), American journalist and writer
- Elizabeth Burgoyne Corbett (1846–1930), British feminist and author
- Elizabeth Burnet (1661–1709), British philanthropist and devotional writer
- Elizabeth Burchill (1904–2003), Australian nurse, philanthropist and author
- Élisabeth Burdot (1940–2021), Belgian journalist
- Elisabeth Bürstenbinder (1838–1918), German writer
- Elizabeth Bury (1644–1720), English writer
- Elizabeth Byrd (1912–1989), historical fiction author
- Elizabeth Byrom (1722–1801), British Jacobite sympathizer and diarist
- Elizabeth Cadell (1903–1989), British writer
- Elizabeth Caffin, New Zealand writer, author and publisher
- Elizabeth Duncan Campbell (1804–1878), Scottish working class poet and autobiographical writer
- Elizabeth Cambridge (1893–1949), English novelist
- Elizabeth Carne (1817–1873), English geologist and writer
- Elizabeth Jordan Carr (born 1981), American journalist
- Elizabeth Carter (1717–1806), English poet, classicist, writer, translator, linguist, polymath
- Elizabeth Castelli, American professor of religion and author
- Elisabeth Castonier (1894–1975), German journalist
- Elisabeth Cavazza (1849–1926), American author, journalist, music critic
- Elizabeth Celi, Australian psychologist and author
- Elizabeth Chadwick (born 1957), British historical fiction writer
- Elizabeth Chapman (1919–2005), British children's author
- Elizabeth Charles (1828–1896), English writer
- Elizabeth Chater (1910–2004), Canadian novelist, poet and professor
- Elizabeth Pickett Chevalier (1896–1984), American novelist
- Elizabeth Chipman, Australian writer, administrator and Antarctic pioneer
- E. C. Spykman (1896–1965), American writer
- Elizabeth Margaret Chandler (1807–1834), American poet
- Elizabeth Christensen, American novelist
- Elizabeth Christitch (1861–1933), Irish and Serbian journalist and writer
- Elizabeth Chadwick, British writer of historical fiction
- Elizabeth Coatsworth (1893–1986), American poet
- Elizabeth Cobbold (1767–1824), English artist, poet and geologist
- Elizabeth Cobbs (born 1956), American historian and author
- Elizabeth Cody Kimmel (born 1964), American children's book writer
- Elizabeth Marney Conner (1856–?), American dramatic reader, educator, author
- Elizabeth Cook-Lynn (1930–2023), Native American writer
- Elizabeth Frances Corbett (1887–1981), American writer of fiction, poems and plays
- Elisabeth Couperus-Baud (1867–1960), Dutch translator
- Elizabeth Crook (born 1959), American novelist
- Elizabeth Crow (1946–2005), American editor, journalist and businesswoman
- Elizabeth Cumings Pierce, American children's author
- Elizabeth Cunningham, American feminist novelist
- Elizabeth Currid-Halkett (born 1978), American social researcher and author
- Elizabeth Cutter Morrow (1873–1955), American poet
- Elizabeth Daly (1878–1967), American writer
- Elizabeth Otis Dannelly (1838–1896), American poet
- Elizabeth Daryush (1887–1977), English poet
- Elizabeth David (1913–1992), British cookery writer
- Elizabeth Davis Beall, American screenwriter and TV producer
- Elizabeth Day (born 1978), British writer
- Elizabeth Deeble (1899–1972), American journalist
- Elizabeth Deering Hanscom (1865–1960), American writer
- Elizabeth Dejeans (1868–1928), American novelist
- Elizabeth Diggs, American playwright and TV writer
- Elizabeth Diller (born 1958), Polish-born American architect
- Elizabeth Dilling (1894–1966), American writer and political activist
- Elizabeth Dole (born 1936), American politician and writer
- Elizabeth Donald (born 1975), American horror author and journalist
- Elizabeth Drew (born 1935), American political journalist and leader
- Elizabeth Sandwith Drinker (1735–1807), Quaker diarist
- Elizabeth Nell Dubus (1933–2020), American author and playwright
- Elizabeth Dawbarn (died 1839), English nurse and religious writer
- Elizabeth Jessup Eames (1813–1856), American writer
- Elisabeth Eaves, American journalist
- Elizabeth Mayhew Edmonds (1821–1907), English translator and writer
- Elizabeth Ehrlich (born 1954), American author
- Elisabeth Eide (born 1950), Norwegian journalist, novelist and non-fiction writer
- Elizabeth Eiloart (1827–1898), English novelist
- Elizabeth Ellis (born 1943), American storyteller and author
- Elizabeth Engstrom (born 1951), American speculative fiction writer
- Elizabeth Enright (1907–1968), American writer
- Elisabeth Erdmann-Macke (1888–1978), German writer
- Elizabeth Esther, American ex-Christian author and blogger
- Elisabeth Eybers (1915–2007), South African poet
- Elizabeth Fair (1908–1997), English writer
- Elizabeth Fama (born 1965), American writer
- Elizabeth Fane (c. 1510–1568), English writer and literary patron
- Élisabeth Fanger (born 1956), French writer
- Elizabeth Farnsworth, American journalist and author
- Elizabeth Farrand (1852–1900), author and librarian
- Elizabeth Farrelly, New Zealand-Australian architecture critic and writer
- Elizabeth P. Farrington (1898–1984), American journalist
- Elizabeth Fensham (born 1953), Australian writer
- Elizabeth Fenwick Way (1916–1996), American writer
- Elizabeth Ferrars (1907–1995), British writer
- Élisabeth Filhol (born 1965), French writer
- Elizabeth Filippouli, Greek journalist-turned-entrepreneur, founder of the international non-profit think tank Global Thinkers Forum
- Elizabeth Warnock Fernea (1927–2008), American anthropologist, writer and filmmaker
- Elisabeth R. Finch, American television writer
- Elizabeth Finkel (born 1956), Polish-born Australian science journalist
- Elizabeth Anne Finn (1825–1921), British writer
- Élisabeth de Fontenay (born 1934), French philosopher and essayist
- Elizabeth Frank (born 1945), American writer and academic
- Elizabeth Forsythe Hailey (born 1938), American journalist and playwright
- Elizabeth Freke (1641–1714), English memoirist, poet and cookery writer
- Elizabeth Fremantle (born 1962), British novelist
- Elizabeth Wynne Fremantle (1778–1857), British diarist
- Elisabeth Frerot Södergren (born 1964), Swedish journalist, television presenter and foreign correspondent
- Elizabeth Gaffney (born 1966), American novelist
- Elizabeth Gaskell (1810–1865), British novelist and short story writer
- Elizabeth Gibney, science journalist
- Elizabeth Gilbert (born 1969), American journalist and author
- ElizaBeth Gilligan (1962–2017), American novelist
- Elizabeth Glaister (1839–1892), British novelist and needlework writer
- Elizabeth Goudge (1900–1984), English novelist and children's writer
- Elizabeth Goudie (1902–1982), Canadian Inuk writer
- Elizabeth Ayton Godwin (1817–1889), English hymnwriter, religious poet
- Elizabeth Gooch (1757–1807), English writer
- Elizabeth Gowing, British-Kosovan writer and traveler
- Élisabeth de Gramont (1875–1954), French writer
- Elizabeth Graver (born 1964), American writer and academic
- Elizabeth Grech (born 1978), Maltese writer and translator
- Elizabeth Grenville (1719–1769), British artist and writer
- Elizabeth Grimston (died 1603), English poet
- Élisabeth Guibert, 18th-century French writer and playwright
- Elizabeth Ham (1783–1859), British poet and writer
- Elizabeth Hampsten (born 1932), American historian and author
- Elizabeth Hand (born 1957), American writer
- Elizabeth Hands (1746–1815), English poet
- Elizabeth Haran (born 1954), Australian novelist
- Elizabeth Boynton Harbert (1843–1925), American author, lecturer, reformer philanthropist
- Elisabeth Harvor (1936–2024), Canadian novelist and poet
- Elisabeth Hauptmann (1897–1973), German writer
- Elisabeth Haussard, French scientific illustrator
- Elizabeth Hawley (1923–2018), journalist and chronicler of Nepal Himalayan expeditions
- Elizabeth Manning Hawthorne (1802–1883), American writer
- Elizabeth Haydon (born 1965), American fantasy writer
- Elizabeth Helme (1743–1814), English writer
- Elizabeth Heyert (born 1951), American photographer and author
- Elisabeth von Heyking (1861–1925), German writer
- Elisabeth Sanxay Holding (1889–1955), American novelist
- Elizabeth Honey (born 1947), Australian writer
- Elizabeth Horrocks (born 1946), British writer
- Elizabeth Hoyt (born 1970), author of historical romance
- Elizabeth O. Sampson Hoyt (1828–1912), American poet
- Elizabeth Humphrys, Australian political economist, academic and author
- Elizabeth Ann "Betty" Hyland (1927–2012), American author
- Elizabeth Inchbald (1753–1821), English novelist, actress, dramatist and translator
- Elizabeth Isham (1609–1654), English intellectual, herbalist and diarist
- Elizabeth Inness-Brown (born 1954), American novelist
- Elisabeth Jäger (1924–2019), Austrian journalist
- Elizabeth Janeway (1913–2005), American novelist
- Elizabeth Jaranyi (1918–1998), Holocaust survivor and writer
- Elizabeth Jekyll (1624–1653), English diarist
- Elizabeth Jolley (1923–2007), Australian writer
- Elizabeth Jordan (1867–1947), American novelist
- Elizabeth Justice (1703–1752), British author
- Elizabeth Kane (1836–1909), American physician, writer and philanthropist
- Elizabeth Kata (1912–1998), Australian writer
- Elizabeth Keckley (1818–1907), American inventor, activist, professional dressmaker and writer
- Elizabeth Kelso (1889–1967), New Zealand journalist, editor and community leader
- Elizabeth Kerner (born 1958), American novelist
- Elizabeth Kerr Coulson (1819–1876), English novelist
- Elizabeth Kilcoyne, American writer of young adult fiction
- Elizabeth Kim, Korean-American journalist
- Elizabeth Knowlton (1895–1989), American mountaineer and writer
- Elizabeth Knox (born 1959), New Zealand writer
- Elizabeth Koch (publisher), American publisher and writer
- Elizabeth Koehler-Pentacoff (born 1957), American author
- Elizabeth Kolbert (born 1961), American journalist, author and scholar
- Elizabeth Korte, American TV writer
- Elizabeth Kostova (born 1964), American writer
- Elisabeth Kuylenstierna-Wenster (1869–1933), Swedish translator and writer
- Elizabeth Kuti, English actress and playwright
- Elisabeth Kyle, Scottish novelist and children’s writer
- Elisabeth Lambert Ortiz (1915–2003), British food writer
- Elizabeth Lambert, American writer of romance
- Elizabeth Landau, US journalist and science educator
- Elisabeth Leamy (born 1967), American journalist, author and speaker
- Elizabeth Lemarchand (1906–2000), English novelist
- Elizabeth Emmet Lenox-Conyngham (1800–1889), Irish poet and translator
- Elizabeth Lesser, author and co-founder/senior adviser of Omega Institute in Rhinebeck, NY
- Elizabeth Letts (born 1961), American author
- Élisabeth Lévy (born 1964), French journalist
- Elizabeth Levy (born 1942), American novelist
- Elizabeth Linington (1921–1988), American novelist
- Elisabeth Luard, British food writer and illustrator
- Elizabeth A. Lynn (born 1946), American writer most known for fantasy and to a lesser extent science fiction
- Elisabeth Mace (born 1933), British writer
- Elisabeth MacIntyre (1916–2004), Australian writer and illustrator
- Elizabeth Macklin (born 1952), American poet
- Elizabeth MacLeod, Canadian writer
- Elizabeth Macneal (born 1988), British writer
- Elizabeth Magid, American fighter pilot and writer
- Elizabeth Mahoney, American screenwriter
- Elizabeth Mansfield (1925–2003), American novelist
- Elizabeth Eunice Marcy (1821–1911), American author, activist, and social reformer
- Elisabeth de Mariaffi, Canadian writer
- Elizabeth Marsh (1735–1785), English writer
- Elizabeth Massie (born 1953), American author
- Elizabeth Mavor (1927–2013), British novelist and biographer
- Elizabeth Mayo (1793–1865), English educational reformer and evangelical writer
- Elizabeth McCausland (1899–1965), American art critic, historian and writer
- Elizabeth McCracken (born 1966), American author
- Elizabeth McCracken (Irish writer) (c. 1871–1944), Irish Union suffragette and author
- Elizabeth McGowan (born 1961), American journalist
- Elizabeth McKenzie (born 1958), American author and editor
- Elizabeth McLeod (born 1963), journalist and broadcast historian
- Elizabeth Meehan (1894–1967), British screenwriter
- Elizabeth Meeke (1761–1826), English novelist and children's writer
- Elizabeth Melville (1578–1630), Scottish poet
- Elizabeth Meriwether (born 1981), American writer and producer
- Elizabeth Merrick (born 1970), American author
- Elizabeth Messenger (1908–1965), New Zealand journalist, cookery writer and crime novelist
- Elizabeth Mixer (abt 1736), American religious autobiographer
- Elizabeth Moon (born 1945), American science fiction and fantasy writer
- Elizabeth Morton (born 1961), British actress and screenwriter
- Elizabeth Murphy Moss (1917–1998), American journalist
- Elizabeth Morton (born 1961), British actress and screenwriter
- Elisabeth Mulder (1904–1987), Spanish writer
- Elizabeth Myers (author), British novelist and short story writer
- Elisabeth Ogilvie (1917–2006), American novelist
- Elisabeth Östnäs, Swedish writer
- Elizabeth Pinchard (1791–1820), English writer
- Elisabeth Maria Post (1755–1812), Dutch poet and writer
- Elizabeth Reapy, Irish writer
- Elisabeth Reichart (born 1953), Austrian author
- Elizabeth Royte, American science/nature writer
- Elizabeth Rubin, American journalist
- Elizabeth Rusch (born 1966), American children's author and magazine writer
- Elisabeth Rynell (born 1954), Swedish poet and novelist
- Élisabeth van Rysselberghe (1890–1980), Belgian translator
- Elizabeth Garton Scanlon, American writer
- Elizabeth Ann Scarborough (born 1947), American novelist
- Elizabeth Scarlett (born 1961), American academic and author
- Elizabeth Seeger (1889–1973), American children's author and educator
- Elizabeth Eggleston Seelye (1858–1923), American writer
- Elizabeth Seifert, American writer
- Elizabeth Searle, American fiction writer
- Elizabeth Shepley Sergeant (1881–1965), American writer
- Elizabeth Shackleton (1726–1781), English diarist
- Elizabeth Shane (1877–1951), Irish poet
- Elizabeth Sharp (writer) (1856–1932), American writer
- Elizabeth Shown Mills (born 1944), American author
- Elizabeth Sican, 18th century Irish literary critic
- Elizabeth Sims (born 1957), American novelist
- Elizabeth Smither (born 1941), New Zealand poet and writer
- Elizabeth Snyder (1914–2021), American TV writer
- Elizabeth Socolow (born 1940), American poet
- Elizabeth Somerville (1774–1840), Scottish novelist
- Elizabeth Clementine Stedman (1810–1889), American poet
- Elizabeth Willisson Stephen (1856–1925), American author
- Elisabeth de Stroumillo (1926–2010), British journalist
- Elizabeth Strout (born 1956), American writer
- Elizabeth Strutt (1782–1867), English writer and traveller
- Elizabeth Stuckey-French (born 1958), American short story writer and novelist
- Elizabeth Subercaseaux (born 1945), Chilean journalist and writer
- Elizabeth Suneby, Jewish children's book author
- Elizabeth Swados (1951–2016), American writer, composer, musician, and theatre director
- Elisabeth Thorsell (born 1945), Swedish writer and genealogist
- Elizabeth Towne (1865–1960), American magazine editor
- Elizabeth Phipps Train (1856–1940), American novelist
- Elizabeth Treadwell (born 1967), American poet
- Elizabeth Trefusis (1762–1808), Cornish poet
- E. M. Valk-Heijnsdijk (1867–1945), Dutch cookbook writer and restaurateur
- Elisabeth de Waal (1899–1991), Austrian writer
- Elizabeth Wagmeister (born 1990), American journalist
- Elizabeth Walcott-Hackshaw (born 1964), Trinidadian writer and academic
- Elizabeth Wallace (writer), American television writer
- Elizabeth Hely Walshe (1835–1869), Irish writer
- Elizabeth Weil, American journalist and nonfiction writer
- Elizabeth E. Wein (born 1964), American writer
- Elisabeth Welhaven (1815–1901), Norwegian writer
- Elizabeth Wellburn (born 1955), Canadian author
- Elizabeth Jane Weston (1582–1612), English-Czech Neo-Latin poet
- Elisabeth Wynhausen (1946–2013), Australian journalist
- Elizabeth Yorke, Countess of Hardwicke (1763–1858), British playwright
- Elizabeth Youatt (1816–1879), British novelist
- Elisabeth Young-Bruehl (1946–2011), American writer

=== Actresses and filmmakers ===
- Elizabeth Adare (born 1949), British television actor
- Elizabeth Alderfer (born 1986), American actress
- Elizabeth Alley (1955–2013), American actress
- Elisabeth Adele Allram-Lechner (1824–1861), Czech stage actress
- Elizabeth Álvarez (born 1977), Mexican telenovela actress
- Elizabeth Amsden (1881–1966), American actress
- Elisabeth Andersen (1920–2018), Dutch actress
- Elizabeth Arciniega, Mexican-Swiss actress
- Elizabeth Ashley (born 1939), American actress
- Elizabeth Aston (1948–2016), English author
- Elizabeth Baird (1810–1890), American writer
- Elizabeth Baity (1907–1989), American children's author
- Elizabeth Balneaves (1911–2006), Scottish author, painter and filmmaker
- Elisabeth Bang (1922–2009), Norwegian actress
- Elizabeth Bannister (1757–1849), British actress and singer
- Elizabeth Barret, American documentary filmmaker
- Elizabeth Barry (1658–1713), English actress
- Elizabeth Baur (1947–2017), American actress
- Elisabeth Bergner (1897–1986), German actress
- Elizabeth Berkley (born 1972), American actress
- Elizabeth Berrington (born 1970), English actress
- Elisabeth Biebl (1915–1989), German actress
- Elizabeth Blower (1763–1820), English writer and actress
- Elizabeth Bogush (born 1977), American actress
- Elizabeth Blackmore (born c. 1987), Australian actress
- Elizabeth Bower (born 1976), English actress
- Élizabeth Bourgine (born 1957), French actress
- Elizabeth Boutell (1648–1715), British actress
- Elizabeth Bracco (born 1957), American actress
- Elizabeth Cappuccino (born 1994), American actress
- Elizabeth Carling (born 1967), English actress
- Elizabeth Chomko (born 1981), American actress, filmmaker and playwright
- Elizabeth Cheshire (born 1967), American actress
- Elizabeth Cervantes (born 1973), Mexican actress of films and soap operas
- Elizabeth Coffey (born 1948), American actress
- Elizabeth Counsell (born 1942), English actress
- Elizabeth Crocker Bowers (1830–1895), American actress
- Elisabeth Croft (1907–2003), English actress
- Elizabeth Currer, Irish actress
- Elizabeth Cuthrell, American film producer
- Elizabeth Daily (born 1961), American actress and singer
- Elizabeth De Razzo (born 1980), American actress
- Elizabeth Debicki (born 1990), Australian actress
- Elizabeth Dennehy (born 1960), American TV and film actress
- Élisabeth Depardieu (born 1941), French actress
- Elisabeth Dermot Walsh (born 1974), English actress
- Elizabeth Destro, American film producer
- Elisabeth Dispannet, French actress
- Elizabeth Dupeyrón (born 1951), Mexican actress
- Elisabeth Easther, New Zealand actor, broadcaster, journalist and playwright
- Elisabeth Ebeling (1946–2020), German film and stage actress
- Elizabeth Rebecca Edwin (1771–1854), Anglo-Irish stage actress
- Elisabeth Engstler (born 1960), Austrian television presenter
- Elisabeth Epp (1910–2000), Austrian actress
- Élisabeth Ercy (born 1944), French actress
- Elisabeth Erm (born 1993), Estonian model
- Elizabeth Estensen (born 1949), English actress
- Elizabeth Farren (c. 1759–1829), Irish actress
- Elizabeth Franz (born 1941), American stage and TV actress
- Elisabeth Frisk (1909–1986), Swedish actress
- Elizabeth Garvie (born 1957), British actress
- Elizabeth Gillies (born 1993), American Broadway actress
- Elisabeth Gording (1907–2001), Norwegian actress
- Elizabeth Gracen (born 1961), American actress
- Elizabeth Gutiérrez (born 1979), American actress and model
- Elizabeth Hamblin (1799–1849), American actress
- Elisabeth Harnois (born 1979), American actress
- Elizabeth Hartman (1943–1987), American actress
- Elisabeth Hasselbeck (born 1977), American actress
- Elizabeth Hawthorne (born 1977), New Zealand actress
- Elizabeth Heard (born c. 1775), English stage actress
- Elizabeth Hendrickson (born 1979), American actress
- Elizabeth Henstridge (born 1987), English actress, model, and director
- Elizabeth Hess (born 1953), Canadian actress
- Elizabeth Hoare (1915–2001), English church furnisher and actress
- Elisabeth Holm, American film producer and screenwriter
- Elizabeth Hopkins (1731–1801), English stage actress
- Elizabeth Hubbard (1933–2023), American actress
- Elizabeth Hurley (born 1965), British actress and model
- Elizabeth Inchbald (1753–1821), English novelist, actress, dramatist and translator
- Elizabeth Inglis (1913–2017), British actress
- Elizabeth Irving (1904–2003), British actress
- Elizabeth Jagger (born 1984), English model and actress
- Elizabeth James, English actress
- Elizabeth Jenns (1911–1968), British actress
- Elizabeth Kaitan (born 1960), American actress
- Elizabeth Katz, French-born Mexican actress and former model
- Elizabeth Keenan, American set decorator
- Elizabeth Keifer (born 1961), American actress
- Elizabeth Kemp (1951–2017), American actress
- Elizabeth "Ellie" Kemper (born 1980), American actress and comedian
- Elizabeth Kerr (1912–2000), American actress
- Elizabeth Kuti, English actress and playwright
- Elizabeth Lail (born 1992), American actress
- Elizabeth Larner (1932–2022), British actress and singer
- Elizabeth Lazebnik, Latvian-Canadian filmmaker
- Elisabeth Lennartz (1902–2001), German stage actress
- Elizabeth Ludlow (born 1989), American actress
- Elizabeth MacRae (1936–2024), American actress
- Elisabeth Markus (1895–1970), Austrian actress
- Elizabeth Marvel (born 1969), American actress
- Elizabeth Mathis (active 2001–2015), American actress
- Elizabeth Maxwell, American voice actress
- Elizabeth McGovern (born 1961), American actress
- Elizabeth McKechnie (born 1961), English actress
- Elizabeth McLaughlin (born 1993), American actress
- Elizabeth McRae (born 1936), New Zealand actress
- Elizabeth Michael (born 1995), Tanzanian actress
- Elizabeth Montgomery (1933–1995), American actress
- Elizabeth Moody (actress) (1939–2010), New Zealand actress and director
- Elisabeth Mooij, Dutch actress
- Elisabeth Moss (born 1982), American actor
- Elisabeth Müller (1926–2006), Swiss actress
- Elisabeth Neumann-Viertel (1900–1994), Austrian actress
- Elizabeth Olin (born 1984), American actress
- Elizabeth Olsen (born 1989), American actress
- Elizabeth Oropesa (born 1954), Filipino actress
- Elizabeth Parkinson, American stage actress and dancer
- Elizabeth Parrish (1925–2022), American actress and singer
- Elisabeth Pinajeff (1900–1995), Russian-German actress
- Élisabeth Rappeneau (1940–2020), French film director
- Elizabeth Reaser (born 1975), American actress
- Elisabeth Reyes (born 1985), Spanish model and moderator
- Elisabeth Risdon (1887–1958), English film actress
- Elisabeth Röhm (born 1973), American-German actress
- Elisabeth Rosen, Canadian actress
- Elizabeth Savalla (born 1949), Brazilian actress
- Elizabeth Saunders, British actress
- Elisabeth Scherer (1914–2013), German actress
- Elisabeth Shue (born 1963), American actress
- Elisabeth Sladen (1946–2011), English actress
- Elisabeth Strøm Henriksen (1940–1985), Norwegian actress
- Elizabeth Teeter, American actress
- Elizabeth Threatt (1926–1993), American actress
- Elisabeth Trissenaar (1944–2024), Austrian actress
- Elizabeth Tulloch (born 1981), American actress
- Elizabeth Tyree (1865–1952), American actress
- Elisabeth Volkmann (1936–2006), German actress
- Elisabeth Welch (1904–2003), American singer, actress and entertainer
- Elisabeth Wendt (1906–1980), German actress
- Elisabeth Wilms (1905–1981), German filmmaker
- Elizabeth Yu, American actress

=== Artists ===
- Elizabeth Amherst Hale (1774–1826), Canadian landscape artist
- Elisabeth Andrae (1876–1945), German painter
- Elizabeth Angrnaqquaq (1916–2003), Canadian Inuk textile artist
- Elizabeth Aro (born 1961), Argentine interdisciplinary artist
- Elizabeth Nutaraluk Aulatjut (1914–1998), Inuk sculptor
- Elizabeth Axtman (born 1980), American mixed-media artist
- Élisabeth Ballet (born 1957), French sculptor
- Elizabeth Balneaves (1911–2006), Scottish author, painter and filmmaker
- Elisabeth Barnekow (1874–1942), Swedish painter
- Elizabeth Blackadder (1931–2021), Scottish painter and printmaker
- Elisabeth Boehm (1843–1914), Russian artist
- Elisabeth Bol-Smit (1904–1987), Dutch artist
- Elizabeth Fearne Bonsall (1861–1956), American painter and illustrator
- Elizabeth Boott (1846–1888), American painter of still life, landscapes, and portraits
- Elizabeth Bradford (born 1950), American painter known for large-scale landscapes
- Elizabeth Bradford Holbrook (1913–2009), Canadian portrait sculptor, medal designer, and liturgical artist
- Elizabeth Blancas, queer Xicana artist specializing in muralism and screen printing
- Elizabeth York Brunton (1880–1960), Scottish painter and printmaker
- Elisabeth Büchsel (1867–1957), German painter
- Elizabeth Butterworth (born 1949), English artist known for painting parrots
- Elizabeth Burden (1841–1924), English embroiderer and teacher
- Elizabeth Burger Monath (1907–1986), Austrian artist known for painting, children's illustration and intaglio
- Elisabeth Calmes (born 1947), Luxembourgish painter
- Elizabeth Carmichael (1927–2004), English oil and pastel portraitist
- Elizabeth Catlett (1915–2012), American artist and sculptor
- Elisabeth Chant, American painter
- Élisabeth Chaplin (1890–1982), French painter
- Elizabeth Charleston (1910–1997), American impressionist flower and landscape painter
- Élisabeth Sophie Chéron (1648–1711), French painter
- Élisabeth Cibot (born 1960), French sculptor and art historian
- Elizabeth Coffin (1850–1930), American painter, educator and philanthropist
- Elizabeth Colborne (1885–1948), American printmaker and illustrator
- Elisabeth Collins (1904–2000), British painter and sculptor
- Elizabeth Colomba (born 1976), French painter of Martinique heritage known for her paintings of black people in historic settings
- Elizabeth Colwell (1881–1961), American printmaker and type designer
- Elisabeth Condon, American painter
- Elizabeth Coppin (1768–1812), British portrait painter
- Elizabeth Kitchenman Coyne (1892–1971), American impressionist painter of landscapes and horses
- Elizabeth Creed (1642–1728), English artist, needleworker and philanthropist
- Elizabeth de Cuevas (1929–2023), French-born American monumental sculptor
- Elisabeth Cummings (born 1934), Australian artist
- Elisabeth Czapek (1860–1949), Swedish miniature painter
- Élisabeth Daynès, French artist
- Elisabeth Dhanens (c. 1915–2014), Belgian art historian
- Elisabeth Dored (1908–1972), Norwegian artist and author
- Elizabeth Durack (1915–2000), Australian painter and dyeline printer
- Elizabeth Dempster (1909–1987), Scottish sculptor and wood carver
- Elizabeth Honor Dolan (1871–1948), American natural history muralist
- Elizabeth Eaton Rosenthal (born 1941), Canadian-American artist and fabric designer known as the "Green Lady of Brooklyn" or her love of the color green
- Elizabeth Eichhorn (born 1957), Argentine sculptor and draftswoman
- Elisabeth von Eicken (1862–1940), German painter
- Elisabeth Epstein (1879–1956), Russian artist
- Elizabeth Erickson, American painter, poet, and educator
- Elisabeth Forsell, Swedish artist
- Elizabeth Friedländer (1903–1984), British calligrapher
- Elisabeth Frink (1930–1993), English sculptor and printmaker
- Elizabeth Fritsch (born 1940), British studio potter and ceramic artist
- Elizabeth Gertsakis (born 1954), Greek-Australian visual artist and photographer
- Elizabeth Ginno (1907–1991), American painter and printmaker
- Elizabeth Glaser (artist), American watercolor painter and folk artist
- Elizabeth Godfrey (1711–1811), English gold and silversmith
- Elizabeth Gower (born 1952), Australian mixed-media artist and collagist
- Elizabeth Goodridge (1798–1882), American miniaturist painter
- Elizabeth Greenwood (1873–1961), New Zealand photographer and an early promoter of the autochrome photographic process in New Zealand
- Elisabeth de Groux (1894–c. 1949), Belgian engraver and painter
- Elizabeth Gulland (1857–1934), Scottish printmaker and painter
- Elisabeth Haarr (1945–2025), Norwegian artist
- Elizabeth Habte Wold (born 1963), Ethiopian mixed-media artist
- Elizabeth Amherst Hale (1774–1826), Canadian watercolor artist
- Elizabeth Harvey (19th-century painter), English portrait painter
- Elisabeth Hase (1905–1991), German photographer
- Elizabeth Haselwood (c. 1644–1715), English silversmith
- Elisabeth Helmer (1854–after 1912), Norwegian photographer
- Elizabeth Horman (1904–2001), American impressionist painter of German heritage
- Elizabeth James-Perry (born 1973), American artist and restoration ecologist
- Elizabeth Jennerjahn (1923–2007), American textile artist, painter and dancer
- Elisabeth Jerichau-Baumann (1819–1881), Polish-Danish painter
- Elisabeth Charlotta Karsten (1789–1856), Swedish artist
- Elizabeth Keith (1887–1956), Scottish print-maker and watercolorist whose works were influenced by her travels to Japan, China, Korea and the Philippines
- Elisabetta Keller (1891–1969), Swiss-Italian artist and founder of the Italian Soroptimist Club
- Elisabeth Keyser (1851–1898), Swedish artist
- Elisabeth Johanna Koning (1816–1887), Dutch painter
- Elizabeth Kugmucheak Alooq (born 1943), Inuk artist
- Elizabeth Layton (1909–1993), American "outsider" artist
- Elizabeth Liddell (1770–1831), British artist specialising in pastel portraits
- Elisabeth Lindemann (1879–1960), German weaver, textile designer and photographer
- Elizabeth Lochrie (1890–1981), American painter, sculptor, and muralist
- Elisabeth Loewe, German painter
- Elizabeth Lucar (1510–1537), British calligrapher, needleworker and algorist
- Elizabeth Gill Lui (born 1951), American photographer, lithographer and artist
- Elizabeth Macdowell Kenton (1858–1953), American painter
- Elizabeth MacKenzie (born 1955), Canadian installation and video artist
- Elizabeth Magill (born 1959), Northern Irish painter
- Elizabeth Cameron Mawson (1849–1939), English painter
- Elizabeth McCord (1914–2008), American modernist painter
- Elizabeth McLaughlin (sculptor), Northern Irish sculptor
- Elizabeth Merriman (born 1963), British painter
- Elizabeth Morley, British silversmith
- Elizabeth Millioud (born 1939), Mexican painter and sculptor
- Elizabeth Muns (active c. 1768), British silversmith
- Elizabeth Nasmyth, Scottish painter and interior designer
- Elizabeth Neel (born 1975), American painter
- Elisabeth Neurdenburg (c. 1882–1957), Dutch art historian
- Elisabeth Niggemeyer (1930–2025), German photographer
- Elisabeth Noltenius (1888–1964), German artist
- Elizabeth Norton (artist) (1887–1985), American artist known for bronze sculptures, painting, and printmaking
- Elizabeth Nourse (1859–1938), American painter
- Elisabeth Ohlson Wallin (1961–2024), Swedish photographer and artist
- Elizabeth Olds (1896–1991), American printmaker
- Elizabeth Osborne (born 1936), American painter
- Elizabeth Otto (born 1970), American art historian
- Elisabeth Palm (1756–1786), Swedish etcher and printmaker
- Elisabeth Pauli (1906–1984), German artist and ethnographer
- Elizabeth Peyton (born 1965), American painter and printmaker
- Elizabeth Polunin (1887–1950), English painter
- Elizabeth Presa (born 1956), Australian visual artist, sculptor and academic
- Elizabeth Prettejohn (born 1961), American art historian
- Elisabeth Reuter (1853–1903), German painter
- Elizabeth Rivers (1903–1964), English artist based in Ireland
- Elisabeth de Saedeleer (1902–1972), Belgian textile artist
- E. Rosa Sawtell (1865–1940), New Zealand artist
- Elisabeth Scepens (fl. 1476), Flemish artist and bookmaker
- Elisabeth Barbara Schmetterling (1804–1882), Dutch artist
- Elisabeth Senault, French calligrapher, engraver and artist
- Elizabeth Shoumatoff (1888–1980), Ukrainian-American painter
- Elizabeth Siddal (1829–1862), Pre-Raphaelite model, artist and poet
- Elizabeth Simcoe (1762–1850), British artist and diarist
- Elizabeth Sisco (born 1954), American artist in the Chicano art movement.
- Elisabeth Söderberg (1912–1991), Austrian-born Swedish painter, textile artist and art teacher
- Elisabeth Sunday (born 1958), American photographer
- Elisabeth Sussman, American art curator
- Élisabeth Swagers (c. 1775–1837), French artist
- Élisabeth Terroux (1759–1822), Swiss artist
- Elisabeth Tonnard, Dutch artist and poet
- Elisabeth Toubro (born 1956), Danish artist
- Elizabeth Tunnuq (1928–2008), Canadian Inuk artist
- Elizabeth Turk, American artist
- Elisabeth Vellacott (1905–2002), English painter
- Élisabeth Vergelat, French painter active in Switzerland
- Élisabeth Vigée Le Brun (1755–1842), French portrait painter
- Elizabeth Flint Wade (1849–1915), American photographer
- Elizabeth Wagele (1939–2017), American cartoonist
- Elizabeth Wallwork (1883–1969), New Zealand artist
- Elisabeth Wandel (1850–1926), Danish painter
- Elisabeth Geertruida Wassenbergh (1729–1781), Dutch artist
- Elisabeth Wesmael, Belgian painter
- Elisabeth Wild (1922–2020), Austrian collage artist
- Elizabeth Vander Zaag, Canadian artist
- Elizabeth Zimmermann (1910–1999), British-born knitter
- Elizabeth Zvonar, Canadian artist

=== Sports ===
- Elizabeth Addo (born 1993), Ghanaian footballer
- Elisabeth Ahlgren (1925–2010), Swedish swimmer
- Elizabeth Akehurst (born 1975), South African cricketer
- Elizabeth Akinyi, Kenyan boxer
- Elizabeth Almada, Argentine athlete
- Elizabeth Amolofo (born 1981), Ghanaian sprinter
- Elizabeth Anderton (born 1938), British ballet dancer and director
- Elizabeth Andiego (born 1986), Kenyan boxer
- Elizabeth Anton (born 1998), New Zealand association football player
- Elizabeth Anyanacho (born 1999), Nigerian taekwondo practitioner
- Elizabeth Ashton (born 1950), Canadian equestrian
- Elisabeth Bachman (born 1978), American volleyball player
- Elizabeth Baidu (born 1978), Ghanaian footballer
- Elisabeth Baldauf (born 1990), Austrian badminton player
- Elizabeth Balogun (born 2000), Nigerian basketball player
- Elisabeth Barléon (born 1983), French Paralympic archer
- Elisabeth Baumgartner (1889–1957), Swiss playwright
- Elizabeth Becker-Pinkston (1903–1989), American diver
- Elizabeth Beisel (born 1992), American competition swimmer
- Elisabeth Berglund (born 1949), Swedish swimmer
- Elisabeth Bergmann (born 1970), Austrian rhythmic gymnast
- Elizabeth Bird (born 1994), British athlete
- Elizabeth Blencowe (born 1961), Australian sprint canoeist
- Elizabeth Blackbourn (1924–1999), British table tennis player
- Elisabeth Böckel, German figure skater
- Elisabeth Bonetsmüller (1907–1987), German high jumper
- Elizabeth Bourland, sports shooter
- Elisabeth Branäs (1930–2010), Swedish female curler
- Elisabeth Brandau (born 1985), German bicycle racer
- Elizabeth Bravo (born 1987), Ecuadorian triathlete
- Elizabeth Bure (born 1948), Papua New Guinean international lawn bowler
- Elizabeth Busche (1992–2012), American curler
- Elizabeth Callahan (born 1952), American sport shooter
- Elizabeth Cailo (born 1987), Angolan handball player
- Elizabeth Cain (born 1962), Australian pair skater and coach
- Élisabeth Camus, French cyclist
- Elizabeth Cann (born 1979), English badminton player
- Elizabeth Carabalí (born 2001), Colombian footballer
- Elizabeth Carruthers (born 1951), Canadian diver
- Elizabeth Castillo (born 1975), Peruvian volleyball player
- Elisabeth Cebrián (born 1971), Spanish basketball player
- Elisabet Cesáreo (born 1999), Spanish handball player
- Elizabeth Chesire (born 1950), Kenyan middle-distance runner
- Élisabeth Chaud (born 1960), French alpine skier
- Elisabeth Chávez (born 1990), Spanish handball player
- Elizabeth Chávez (born 1972), Honduran sprinter
- Élisabeth Chevanne Brunel (born 1975), French cyclist
- Elizabeth Church (born 1930), British swimmer
- Elisabeth Clay (born 2000), Brazilian jiu-jitsu practitioner
- Elizabeth Collins (born 1982), Canadian swimmer
- Elizabeth Copes (born 1976), Argentine judoka
- Elizabeth Coster (born 1982), New Zealand swimmer
- Elizabeth Cudjoe (born 1992), Ghanaian footballer
- Elizabeth Cui (born 1997), New Zealand diver
- Elisabeth Cuypers, Belgian chess player
- Elizabeth Dadzie (born 1993), Ghanaian athlete
- Elizabeth Davenport, Indian javelin thrower
- Elisabeth Davin (born 1981), Belgian hurdler
- Elizabeth Dekkers, Australian swimmer
- Elisabeth Demleitner (born 1952), German luger
- Elizabeth Dickson (bowls) (died 2022), Scottish lawn bowler
- Elisabeth Dos-Kellner (born 1966), Austrian Paralympic alpine skier
- Elisabeth Eberl (born 1988), Austrian javelin thrower
- Elizabeth Eddy (born 1991), American soccer player
- Elizabeth Edmondson (born 1950), Australian Paralympic swimmer
- Elisabeth Ekblom (born 1958), Swedish tennis player
- Elizabeth Emry (1923–1995), American baseball player
- Elizabeth Ernest-James, Welsh tennis player
- Elisabeth Esterl (born 1976), German professional golfer
- Elizabeth Fabac (1922–2008), baseball player
- Elizabeth Farrow (1926–2010), American baseball player
- Elizabeth Galphin, American tennis player
- Elisabeth Garcia (born 1975), Norwegian sport wrestler
- Elisabeth Georgostathis (born 2001), Australian rules footballer
- Élizabeth Giguère (born 1997), Canadian ice hockey player
- Elizabeth Gleadle (born 1988), Canadian track and field athlete
- Elizabeth Rodrigues Gomes (born 1965), Brazilian Paralympic athlete
- Elizabeth Gómez (born 1981), Mexican footballer
- Elisabeth Görgl (born 1981), Austrian alpine skier
- Elisabeth Gram (born 1996), Austrian freestyle skier
- Elisabeth Grasser (1904–2002), Austrian fencer
- Élisabeth Grousselle (born 1973), French middle-distance runner
- Elizabeth Guess (born 1985), American soccer forward and midfielder
- Elisabeth Habeler (born 1974), Austrian tennis player
- Elisabeth Hapala, Austrian chess player
- Elizabeth Hawkins-Whitshed (1860–1934), Irish mountain climber
- Elizabeth Henshilwood (born 1975), British rower
- Elizabeth Henstridge (born 1987), English actress, model, and director
- Elizabeth Hepple (born 1959), Australian cyclist
- Elizabeth Twistington Higgins (1923–1990), British ballet dancer and painter
- Elisabeth Hilmo (born 1976), Norwegian handball player
- Elisabeth Högberg (born 1986), Swedish biathlete
- Elisabeth Hohenwarter, Austrian mountain bike orienteer
- Elizabeth Hosking (born 2001), Canadian snowboarder
- Elizabeth Hulette aka Miss Elizabeth (1960–2003), professional wrestling manager
- Elisabeth Ibarra (born 1981), Spanish footballer
- Elisabeth Ingvaldsen (born 1973), Norwegian orienteering competitor
- Elizabeth Jack (born 1958), Australian diver
- Elizabeth Jenner (born 1941), British sprinter
- Elizabeth Jimie (born 1992), Malaysian swimmer
- Elisabeth Käser (born 1951), Swiss slalom canoeist
- Elizabeth Kell (born 1983), Australian rower
- Elisabeth Kirchler (born 1963), Austrian alpine skier
- Elizabeth Kitley (born 2001), American basketball player
- Elisabeth Knechtl (born 1971), Austrian épée fencer
- Elizabeth Kobak, American tennis player
- Elizabeth Koleva (born 1972), Bulgarian rhythmic gymnast
- Elisabeth Koning (1917–1975), Dutch sprinter
- Elizabeth Koshy (born 1994), Indian sport shooter
- Elisabeth Kouassi (born 1967), Ivorian handball player
- Elisabeth Kropp, German canoeist
- Elizabeth Kwon, American figure skater
- Elisabeth Ländle, German curler
- Elizabeth Langley (born 1933), dancer and choreographer
- Elizabeth Latief (born 1963), Indonesian badminton player
- Elisabeth Leidinge (born 1957), Swedish footballer
- Elizabeth Lemley (born 2006), American freestyle skier
- Elizabeth Lindsay (1912–2013), American discus thrower and Girl Scout
- Elizabeth Line (gymnast) (born 1985), British gymnast
- Élisabeth Loisel (born 1963), French footballer and manager
- Elisabeth López (born 1975), Spanish handball player
- Elizabeth Lumpkin (born 1986), American tennis player
- Elisabeth Mahn (born 1986), Austrian synchronized swimmer
- Elizabeth Mahon (1919–2001), American baseball player
- Elisabeth Maier (born 1994), Canadian former skeleton bobsleigh racer
- Elisabeth Mandaba (born 1989), Central African Republic middle-distance runner
- Elizabeth Mandlik (born 2001), American tennis player
- Elizabeth Manley (born 1965), Canadian figure skater
- Elizabeth Manu (born 1986), New Zealand netball player
- Elisabeth Maragall (born 1970), Spanish field hockey player
- Elizabeth Marks (born 1990), American Paralympic swimmer
- Elisabeth Maxwald (1967–2013), Austrian Paralympic skier
- Elizabeth May (triathlete) (born 1983), Luxembourgish triathlete
- Elisabeth Mayr (born 1996), Austrian footballer
- Elizabeth McCagg (born 1967), American rower
- Elizabeth McGorian, Zimbabwean ballerina
- Elizabeth McIntyre (born 1965), American freestyle skier
- Elizabeth McMahon (born 1993), American volleyball player
- Elizabeth Meyer, American sailor and boat restorer
- Elisabeth Mikula (born 1951), Austrian figure skater
- Elizabeth Milne (born 1990), New Zealand footballer
- Elisabeth Minnig (born 1987), Argentine footballer
- Elizabeth Minter (born 1965), Australian tennis player
- Elizabeth Mitchell (1972–1998), American shag dancer
- Elizabeth Moceiwai (born 1976), Fijian international female lawn bowler
- Elizabeth Mongudhi (born 1970), Namibian long-distance runner
- Elizabeth Müller (1926–2010), Brazilian athletics competitor
- Elizabeth Muthuka (born 1975), Kenyan sprinter
- Elizabeth Mystakidou (born 1977), Greek taekwondo athlete
- Elisabeth Nagele (1933–1993), Swiss luger
- Elisabeth Nestler (born 1951), Austrian figure skater
- Elisabeth Neuenschwander (born 1946), Swiss middle-distance runner
- Elisabeth Nikiema (born 1982), Burkinabé swimmer
- Elisabeth Norredahl (born 1967), Swedish female curler
- Elisabeth Oestreich (1909–1994), German middle-distance runner
- Elizabeth Omoregie (born 1996), Bulgarian-Slovenian handball player
- Elizabeth Onuah (born 1995), Nigerian weightlifter
- Elizabeth Oppong (born 2003), Ghanaian footballer
- Elizabeth Oshoba (born 1999), Nigerian featherweight boxer
- Elisabeth Osl (born 1985), Austrian cross-country mountain biker
- Elisabeth Östberg (born 1940), Swedish sprinter
- Elisabeth Ostermeyer (born 1929), German gymnast
- Elisabeth Osterwalder, Swiss Para-athlete
- Elizabeth Owusuaa (born 2001), Ghanaian footballer
- Elisabeth Pähtz (born 1985), German chess grandmaster
- Elizabeth Paisieva (born 1986), Bulgarian rhythmic gymnast
- Élisabeth Paradis (born 1992), Canadian ice dancer
- Elizabeth Paton (rower) (born 1952), British rower
- Elizabeth Patrick (born 1985), Australian rowing cox
- Elisabeth Pavel (born 1990), Romanian basketball player
- Elizabeth Pelton (born 1993), American swimmer
- Elisabeth Persson (born 1964), Swedish curler
- Elizabeth Pesiridou (born 1992), Greek hurdler
- Elisabeth Pihela (born 2004), Estonian athlete
- Elisabeth Pinedo (born 1981), Spanish handball player
- Elisabeth Pistauer (born 1955), Austrian field hockey player
- Elizabeth Poblete (born 1987), Chilean weightlifter
- Elizabeth Popper (born 1962), Venezuelan table tennis player
- Elizabeth Priddle (born 1993), Scottish cricketer
- Elizabeth Prinsloo, South African Paralympic swimmer
- Elizabeth Punsalan (born 1971), American ice dancer
- Elizabeth Ralston (born 1995), Australian soccer player
- Elisabeth Randerz (born 1950), Swedish sprinter
- Elizabeth Rastall (1881–1967), American tennis player
- Elisabeth Raudaschl (born 1997), Austrian ski jumper
- Elisabeth Rechlin (1930–2021), German swimmer
- Elisabeth Reisinger (born 1996), Austrian alpine skier
- Élisabeth Revol (born 1979), French high-altitude climber
- Elisabeth Riegler (born 1995), Austrian cyclist
- Élisabeth Riffiod (born 1947), French basketball player
- Elizabeth Rowley (netball) (born 1949), New Zealand netball player
- Elizabeth Rumokol (born 1983), Kenyan long-distance runner
- Elisabeth Salom (born 1989), Spanish rhythmic gymnast
- Elisabeth Schicho (born 1991), German skier
- Elizabeth Schmidt (born 1977), American tennis player
- Elisabeth Schooling (1915–1998), British ballet dancer
- Elizabeth Scotty (born 2001), American tennis player
- Elizabeth Sharman (born 1957), British canoeist
- Elizabeth Shaughnessy (born 1937), Irish-American chess player
- Elisabeth Schwarz, professional name of Sissy Schwarz (born 1936), Austrian figure skater
- Elisabeth Seitz (born 1993), German artistic gymnast
- Elisabeth Skogen, Norwegian female curler
- Elisabeth Slettum (born 1986), Norwegian athlete
- Elizabeth Smylie (born 1963), Australian tennis player
- Elizabeth Steventon (1912–?), British table tennis player
- Elisabeth Sullivan (born 1991), National Women’s Soccer League forward
- Elisabeth Svoboda (born 1942), Austrian diver
- Elizabeth Swaney (born 1984), Hungarian freestyle skier
- Elizabeth Szokol (born 1996), American professional golfer
- Elizabeth Tadich (born 1976), Australian cyclist
- Élisabeth Tardy (born 1972), French cross-country skier
- Elizabeth Tartakovsky (born 2000), American Olympic saber fencer
- Elisabeth Terland (born 2001), Norwegian footballer
- Elisabeth Theurer (born 1956), Austrian equestrian
- Elisabeth Tieber (born 1990), Austrian footballer
- Elizabeth Tinnon (born 1985), American breaststroke swimmer
- Elizabeth Triegaardt (born 1946), South African ballet dancer
- Elisabeth Valle (born 1978), Spanish gymnast
- Elizabeth Van Welie (born 1979), New Zealand swimmer
- Elisabeth Veening, Dutch curler and coach
- Elizabeth Viegas (born 1985), Angolan handball player
- Elizabeth Villanueva (born 1974), Argentine footballer
- Elisabeth de Waard (born 1958), Dutch Antillean windsurfer
- Elisabeth Wahlin (born 1980), Norwegian football player
- Elizabeth Wambui (born 1998), Kenyan footballer
- Elisabeth Westman (born 1966), Swedish cyclist
- Elizabeth Wicken, Canadian baseball player
- Elizabeth Wilde (1913–2005), American sprinter
- Elizabeth Williams (born 1993), American basketball player
- Elizabeth Wilkinson, 18th-century English martial artist
- Elisabeth Willeboordse (born 1978), Dutch judoka
- Elizabeth Woods (born 1960), Australian magistrate and basketball administrator
- Elizabeth Woolsey (1908–1977), American alpine skier
- Elizabeth Wycliffe (born 1983), Canadian swimmer
- Elizabeth Yeager (born 2003), American field hockey player
- Elisabeth Ygge (born 1987), Swedish rugby union player
- Elizabeth Yin (born 1991), Singaporean sailor
- Elizabeth Zamora (born 1993), Guatemalan taekwondo practitioner
- Elizabeth Zaragoza (born 1968), Salvadoran long-distance runner
- Elisabeth Zehetner (born 1957), Austrian handball player
- Elisabeth Zerobin, Austrian para-alpine skier

=== Criminals ===
- Elizabeth of Doberschütz (died 1591), Pomeranian woman beheaded as a witch
- Elizabeth Branch (1672–1740), British murderer
- Elizabeth Broadingham (died 1776), British murderer burned at the stake
- Elizabeth Brownrigg (1720–1767), British murderer
- Elisabeth Gassner (c. 1747–1788), German pickpocket
- Elizabeth Gaunt (died 1685), English traitor convicted for involvement in the Rye House Plot
- Elizabeth Harriet Grieve (c. 1723 – 1782), British swindler
- Elizabeth Haysom (born 1964), Canadian convicted felon
- Elizabeth Holmes (born 1984), American fraudster who founded Theranos
- Elisabeth Marschall (1886–1947), German head nurse (Oberschwester) at Ravensbrück concentration camp, later executed for war crimes
- Elizabeth Potts (1846–1890), English murderer
- Elizabeth Ridgeway (died 1684), English murderer
- Elizabeth Steel (c. 1766–1795), English convict sent to Australia aboard a ship of the Second Fleet
- Elizabeth Thackery (1767–1856), Australian convict and colonist
- Elizabeth Van Valkenburgh (1799–1846), American murderer
- Elizabeth Wettlaufer (born 1967), Canadian nurse and serial killer
- Elisabeth Wiese (1853–1905), German serial killer
- Elizabeth Woolcock (1848–1873), Australian murderer

=== Others ===
- Elisabeth Abegg (1882–1974), German educator and Righteous Among the Nations recipient
- Elizabeth Sewall Alcott (1835–1858), sister of Louisa May Alcott
- Elizabeth Aldrich (born 1947), American dance historian
- Elizabeth Alex, American news anchor
- Elizabeth Jaquelin Ambler Brent Carrington (1765–1842), American philanthropist
- Elizabeth Armistead (1750–1842), English courtesan
- Elizabeth Mary Aslin (1923–1989), English art historian, administrator, author and lecturer
- Elizabeth Avellán (born 1960), Venezuelan-American film producer
- Elizabeth Ayer (1897–1987), American architect
- Elisabeth Bamberger (1889–1971), German Jewish businesswoman and art collector
- Elizabeth Swain Bannister (1785–1828), enslaved woman of colour from Barbados who became a free woman
- Elizabeth Barnard (1608–1670), granddaughter of William Shakespeare
- Elisabeth Bas (c. 1571–1649), Dutch businesswoman and pub-owner
- Elizabeth Bather (1904–1988), British police officer
- Elizabeth Bauer Mock (1911–1998), American architect
- Elisabeth Belliveau (born 1979), Canadian interdisciplinary artist and author
- Elisabeth Benjamin (1908–1999), English architect
- Elisabeth Bernoulli (1873–1935), Swiss temperance campaigner
- S. Elizabeth Bird, British-American anthropologist
- Elizabeth Ann Blaesing (1919–2005), daughter of Warren Harding
- Elizabeth Bland (1681–1712), English Hebraist
- Elisabeth Bleyleben-Koren (born 1948), Austrian bank manager
- Elizabeth Bolden (1890–2006), American supercentenarian
- Elizabeth Bond (1942–2002), Australian broadcaster
- Elizabeth Borgwardt (born 1965), American historian and lawyer
- Elisabeth Bouchaud (born 1961), French physicist, playwright and actress
- Elizabeth Brant, Native American
- Elisabeth Brewer, American nurse and loyalist
- Elizabeth Broderick, Australian lawyer
- Elizabeth Brontë, lesser known sister of the Brontës
- Elizabeth Buchanan, former Private Secretary to the Prince of Wales
- Elizabeth Burchenal (1875–1959), American folklorist
- Elizabeth Burnett (1766–1790), Scottish muse
- Elizabeth Cadbury-Brown (1922–2002), American architect
- Elizabeth Calvert (1731–1788), heiress in colonial Maryland
- Elizabeth Canning (1734–1773), English maidservant
- Elizabeth R. Cantwell, American researcher and professor of aerospace-mechanical engineering
- Elizabeth D. Carney, scholar of ancient Macedonia
- Elizabeth Carpenter, American fashion designer
- Elisabeth Cassutto (1931–1984), American Evangelist
- Elizabeth Chamber (died 1602), English courtier
- Elizabeth Chamblee Burch, American lawyer
- Elizabeth Chesterton (1915–2002), British architect and town planner
- Elizabeth Chong (born 1931), Australian celebrity chef
- Elisabeth Christman (1881–1975), American trade unionist
- Elizabeth Chu Richter, Chinese-born American architect
- Elizabeth T. Clement (born 1977), American judge
- Elizabeth Close (1912–2011), Austrian-American architect
- Elizabeth Coit (1892–1987), American architect
- Elizabeth Concordia, President of UCHealth
- Elizabeth Sprague Coolidge (1864–1953), American patron of music
- Elizabeth A. Copeland (born 1964), American judge
- Elizabeth Cowell (1912–1998), British broadcaster and TV announcer
- Elizabeth Craze, youngest recipient of a heart transplant
- Elizabeth Cresswell (1625–1698), English prostitute and brothel keeper
- Elizabeth Crofts (born 1535), English impostor
- Elizabeth Curtain, Australian judge
- Elizabeth Parke Custis Law (1776–1831), granddaughter of Martha Dandridge Custis Washington
- Elizabeth Cameron Dalman, Australian choreographer
- Elizabeth Dauncey (1506–1564), English courtier
- Elisabeth van Dedem Lecky (1842–1912), Dutch-Irish writer, historian and suffragist
- Elizabeth Dee, American art dealer
- Elisabeth Deichmann-Schaaffhausen (1811–1888), German aristocrat and hostess
- Elizabeth Denby (1894–1965), English social housing expert and consultant
- Elizabeth Devick (fl. 1600–1620), English servant of Anne of Denmark
- Elizabeth Dickens (1789–1863), mother of Charles Dickens
- Elizabeth Digeser, American academic and historian
- Elizabeth Diller, American architect
- Elisabeth Djouka (died 2024), Cameroonian nationalist militant
- Elisabeth Djurle (1930–2014), Swedish Lutheran dean
- Elizabeth Dobson Altemus (1874–1947), American socialite
- Elizabeth Donnan (1883–1955), historian of the slave trade
- Elisabeth Dons Christensen (born 1944), Danish Lutheran theologian
- Elisabeth Duda, Polish actress and writer
- Elizabeth Eaglesfield (1853–1940), American lawyer
- Elizabeth Eckford (born 1941), part of the Little Rock Nine
- Elizabeth Eckhardt May (1899–1996), American home economist
- Elizabeth Economy, American political scientist
- Elizabeth Eden (1946–1987), American transgender woman
- Elizabeth Eggleston Seelye (1858–1923), American historian
- Elizabeth Eisenstein (1923–2016), American historian
- Elizabeth Elohor Isiorho (born 1980), Nigerian model and entrepreneur
- Elizabeth Emanuel (born 1953), British fashion designer
- Elizabeth Erny Foote (born 1953), American judge
- Elizabeth Errington, South African numismatist
- Elizabeth Esteve-Coll (born 1938), British academic and former museum director
- Elizabeth Evatt (born 1933), Australian judge
- Elizabeth Everest (c. 1832–1895), nursery nurse to Winston Churchill
- Elizabeth Everitt, recipient of the Albert Medal
- Elizabeth Falkner, American consulting chef
- Elizabeth Fee (1946–2018), medical historian
- Elizabeth A. Fenn (born 1959), American historian
- Élisabeth Ferrand, French salon-holder and philosopher
- Elizabeth Fink (1945–2015), American lawyer
- Elizabeth Holmes Fisher (1867–1955), American art collector
- Elizabeth Fletcher (1731–1758), Scottish scholar
- Elisabeth Flickenschildt (1905–1977), German actress, producer and author
- Elizabeth Flower (1915–1995), American philosopher
- Elizabeth Fones (1610–1673), settler of the Massachusetts Bay Colony
- Elisabeth Förster-Nietzsche (1846–1935), sister of philosopher Friedrich Nietzsche
- Elizabeth Francis (1909–2024), American supercentenarian
- Elizabeth Frazer Skelton (1800–1855), Euro-African slave trader
- Elizabeth Fullerton (born 1953), Australian judge
- Elizabeth Fussell, American sociologist
- Elizabeth Gage, British jewellery designer and goldsmith
- Elizabeth Garber (1939–2020), American historian of science
- Elizabeth Gardiner (born 1966), British civil servant
- Élisabeth Garouste (born 1946), French interior designer
- Elizabeth Garrett (1963–2016), American academic
- Elizabeth Gasiba (born 1997), Venezuelan model, Miss Universe Venezuela 2022
- Elisabeth Gerdts-Rupp (1888–1972), German ethnologist
- Elizabeth Gibb (died 1595), Scottish courtier
- Elisabeth Glantzberg, Swedish textile artist, educator and fashion designer
- Elizabeth Glidden, lawyer, public policy professional and academic
- Elisabeth Charlotte Gloeden (1903–1944), German resistance fighter
- Elizabeth Gloster (born 1949), judge of the Court of Appeal of England and Wales
- Elizabeth Gobeil, American judge
- Elizabeth Goodyear-Grant, Canadian political scientist
- Elizabeth Gorcey, American filmmaker
- Elisabeth Granneman (1930–1992), Norwegian actress writer and musician
- Elizabeth Greenhill (bookbinder) (1907–2006), English bookbinder
- Élisabeth Greffulhe (1860–1952), French socialite
- Elizabeth Griffin (1945–2015), Montserratian barrister
- Elizabeth B. Grimball (1875–1953), American theatrical producer
- Elizabeth A. Grimes, American judge
- Elizabeth Guard (1814–1870), Australian founding mother and hostage
- Elizabeth du Gué Trapier (1893–1974), American art expert
- Elisabeth Guppy, British spiritualist medium
- Elisabeth Guttenberger (1926–2024), German holocaust survivor and human rights activist
- Elizabeth Haigh (born 1988), Singaporean chef
- Elizabeth Hazelton Haight (1872–1964), American classical scholar and academic
- Elizabeth Virginia Hallanan (1925–2004), American judge
- Elisabeth Hallowell Saunders (1861–1910), American scientific illustrator, photographer, naturalist and teacher
- Elizabeth Hamer Kegan (1912–1979), American archivist and historian
- Elizabeth Hanbury (1793–1901), British philanthropist
- Elizabeth Hanes (born 1978), American judge
- Elisabeth Hartnagel-Scholl, German centenarian
- Elizabeth Harvey (historian), British historian
- Elizabeth Haub (1899–1977), German philanthropist
- Elisabeth Lier Haugseth, Norwegian lawyer and civil servant
- Elizabeth Hawes (1903–1971), American fashion designer
- Elizabeth A. Hayden, American lawyer
- Elizabeth Higginbotham, sociologist
- Elizabeth Hilden (born 1970), American adult model
- Elizabeth Hinton (born 1983), American historian
- Elizabeth Hirsh Fleisher (1892–1975), American architect
- Elizabeth Hollingworth, Australian judge
- Elisabeth Margaret Hopkins (1894–1991), Canadian artist and author
- Elizabeth Hubbell Fisk, American textile maker from Vermont
- Elizabeth Anne Hull (1937–2021), American academic
- Elizabeth V. Hume (born 1956), American linguist
- Elizabeth Shakman Hurd, British political scientist
- Elizabeth Hurley (judge), American judge
- Elizabeth Ibanda-Nahamya (died 2023), Ugandan lawyer and judge
- Elizabeth Isichei (born 1939), New Zealand historian and academic
- Elizabeth Jeffreys (1941–2023), British Byzantine scholar
- Elizabeth Johnston Evans Johnston (1851–1934), American philanthropist and social worker
- Elisabeth Jungmann (1894–1958), interpreter, secretary and midwife of Max Beerbohm
- Elizabeth Kabanda, Ugandan lawyer and judge
- Elisabeth Karg-Gasterstädt (1886–1954), German medievalist and linguist
- Elizabeth Karlsen (born 1960), British film producer
- Elizabeth Topham Kennan (born 1938), American academic
- Elizabeth Key Grinstead (1630–1665), enslaved woman in colonial America
- Elizabeth D'Arcy Kinne (1843–1918), American organizational leader
- Elizabeth Kirkhope, Australian headmistress
- Elizabeth Kiss, American philosopher
- Elizabeth Kitson (1546–1628), English music patron
- Elizabeth Klarer (1910–1994), South African alien contactee claimant
- Elisabeth Kleinert-Neumann (1905–2003), German film editor
- Elizabeth Klerman, professor of neurology
- Elisabeth Kohn (1904–1941), German-Jewish lawyer
- Elizabeth A. Kovachevich (born 1936), American judge
- Elizabeth Kridl Valkenier (1926–2024), Polish-American art historian
- Elisabeth Kristoffersen (born 1988), Norwegian free diver and president of AIDA Norway
- Elisabeth Krumme (1897–1984), German lawyer and criminal judge
- Elizabeth B. Lacy (born 1945), American judge
- Elisabeth Laing (born 1956), British judge
- Elizabeth Lane (1905–1988), English barrister and judge
- Elizabeth LaPensée, American researcher of video game culture
- Elizabeth Eva Leach (born 1971), British musicologist and music theorist
- Élisabeth Lebovici, French art historian, journalist and art critic
- Elizabeth LeCompte (born 1944), American director of theater, dance and media in NYC
- Elizabeth Medora Leigh (1814–1849), third daughter of Augusta Leigh
- Elizabeth Lenjo, Kenyan lawyer
- Élisabeth Leseur (1866–1914), French mystic
- Elizabeth Lew-Williams, American academic
- Élisabeth Lochen, French film director
- Elizabeth Longford (1906–2002), British historian
- Elizabeth Losh (born 1965), American media theorist and rhetorician
- Elizabeth Lucy, misnamed possible mistress of King Edward VI of England
- Elizabeth Lunbeck, American historian
- Elisabeth Luther (1527–1528), first daughter and second child of Martin Luther
- Élisabeth de Mac Mahon (1834–1900), French spouse of Patrice de Mac Mahon
- Elizabeth MacDonough (born 1966), American lawyer
- Elizabeth Ann Macgregor, Scottish-born curator and art historian
- Elizabeth MacLeod Walls, American academic administrator
- Elizabeth Macpherson, New Zealand law academic, expert on New Zealand water rights
- Elizabeth Wragg Manigault (1736–1773), colonial American socialite
- Elisabeth Martini, American architect
- Elisabeth Massi Fritz (born 1967), Swedish lawyer
- Elizabeth A. McAlister, American scholar and professor
- Elizabeth McBride (1955–1997), American costume designer
- Elizabeth Ireland McCann (1931–2021), American theatrical producer
- Elizabeth Anne McCauley (born 1950), American art historian
- Elizabeth McKinley, New Zealand academic
- Elizabeth McLeay, New Zealand political science academic
- Elizabeth Storrs Mead (1832–1917), American academic
- Elizabeth Meckes (1980–2020), American mathematician
- Elizabeth Meese, American academic of feminist theory
- Elizabeth Alexandria Menzies (1928–2008), British historian
- Elizabeth H. Metcalf (1852–1925), American amateur anthropologist
- Elizabeth Mills-Robertson, Ghanaian police officer
- Elizabeth Minchin, Australian classicist
- Elizabeth Moleyns (1563–?), English courtier
- Elisabeth Møller Jensen (born 1946), Danish literary historian and feminist
- Elisabeth Moltmann-Wendel (1926–2016), German feminist theologian
- Elizabeth Monroe (1768–1830), First Lady of the United States (1817–1825)
- Elizabeth Moran (born 1984), American photographer
- Elizabeth Mosquera (born 1991), Venezuelan model and beauty queen
- Elizabeth Mrema (born 1957), Tanzanian biodiversity leader and lawyer
- Elizabeth Murdoch (1909–2012), Australian philanthropist
- Elizabeth Musoke, Ugandan lawyer and judge
- Elizabeth Mynatt (born 1966), American academic
- Elizabeth Nabel, American academic
- Elizabeth Nannestad (born 1956), New Zealand poet
- Elizabeth Needham (died 1731), English procuress and brothel-keeper
- Elizabeth Nel (1917–2007), personal secretary to Winston Churchill
- Elizabeth Neumann (born 1979), American security expert
- Elizabeth Newbery (c. 1745–1821), bookseller and publisher
- Elizabeth Pease Nichol (1807–1897), British activist
- Elizabeth Nicholls (1946–2004), Canadian scientist
- Elizabeth Nichols (1821–1911), American nurse
- Elizabeth Nickson, Canadian writer and journalist
- Elizabeth Noble (born 1968), British novelist
- Elizabeth Nodder, 19th-century publisher and artist
- Elizabeth Nord (1902–1986), American label organizer
- Elizabeth Norman, American author and historian
- Elizabeth Norment (1952–2014), American actress
- Elizabeth Norton (born 1986), American author and historian
- Elizabeth Noyce (1930–1996), American philanthropist
- Elizabeth Nunez, American novelist
- Elizabeth Styring Nutt (1870–1946), British-Canadian artist and educator
- Elizabeth Odio Benito (born 1939), Costa Rican international human rights judge
- Elizabeth Ogilvie (born 1946), Scottish environmental artist
- Elizabeth Akua Ohene (born 1945), Ghanaian politician
- Elizabeth K. Ohi (1911–1976), American lawyer
- Elizabeth Oldfield (died 2010), British writer
- Elizabeth Martha Olmsted (1825–1910), American poet
- Elizabeth Kay Olten (1999–2009), American murder victim
- Elisabeth Omilami (born 1951), American activist and actress
- Elizabeth Lee Owen Macdonald (1835–1901), Canadian writer
- Elizabeth Pabodie (1623–1717), first white settler born in New England
- Elizabeth Packard (1816–1897), American women's rights activist
- Elizabeth Paepcke (1902–1994), American philanthropist
- Elizabeth Pain (1652–1704), American settler
- Elizabeth Partridge (born 1951), American writer
- Elizabeth Patton Crockett (1788–1860), American farmer and housewife
- Elizabeth Okie Paxton (1878–1972), American painter
- Elizabeth Peabody (1804–1894), American educator
- Elizabeth Peacock (born 1937), British politician
- Elizabeth Peer (1936–1984), American journalist
- Elizabeth Peña (1959–2014), American actress
- Elizabeth Pennington (1732–1759), English poet
- Elisabeth Pepys (1640–1669), wife of Samuel Pepys
- Elizabeth Peratrovich (1911–1958), Native-American civil rights activist
- Elizabeth Perkins (born 1960), American actress
- Elizabeth Phelan (1920–2016), American politician
- Elizabeth Philp (1827–1885), English singer, music educator and composer
- Elizabeth Philpot (1780–1857), British palaeontologist
- Elizabeth Phiri, Zambian politician
- Elizabeth Pillion, American chemist
- Elizabeth Pinfold (1859–1927), New Zealand recipient of the Queen Elizabeth Medal
- Elizabeth Piper Ensley (1847–1919), American educator, suffragist, journalist and activist
- Elizabeth Pipko (born 1995), American author, model and founder of Exodus Movement
- Elizabeth Pirie (1932–2005), British numismatist
- Elizabeth Pisani, British-American epidemiologist, public health consultant and author
- Elizabeth Pitcairn (born 1973), American musical artist
- Elizabeth Pittman, American judge
- Elizabeth Plankinton (1853–1923), American philanthropist
- Elizabeth Plater-Zyberk (born 1950), American architect and urban planner
- Elizabeth A. Platz, American cancer epidemiologist
- Elizabeth Plimack, American medical oncologist
- Elizabeth Poirier (born 1942), American politician
- Elizabeth Polack, English playwright
- Elizabeth Polwheele (1651–1691), British playwright
- Elizabeth Poole (1588–1654), English settler in Plymouth Colony
- Elizabeth Post (1920–2010), American etiquette writer
- Elizabeth Poston (1905–1987), English composer, pianist and writer
- Elizabeth Willing Powel (1743–1830), American socialite from Philadelphia
- Elizabeth Power (born 1941), English actress
- Elizabeth Prann, American journalist
- Elizabeth Prelogar, American solicitor general
- Elizabeth Prentiss (1818–1878), American author
- Elisabeth Prueitt, American pastry chef
- Elizabeth Pue (fl. 1722–1726), Irish newspaper publisher
- Elizabeth Pullu, Malawian model and beauty pageant
- Elizabeth Pulman (1836–1900), New Zealand photographer
- Elizabeth Puranam, New Zealand television anchor and journalist
- Elizabeth Raffald (1733–1781), English writer, innovator and entrepreneur
- Elizabeth Rainforth (1814–1877), English musical artist
- Elizabeth Ramsey (1931–2015), Filipina comedian, singer, and actress
- Elizabeth Randall, member of the New Jersey General Assembly
- Elizabeth Randles (1800–1829), Welsh musician
- Elizabeth Schmoke Randolph, American educator
- Elizabeth Raper, judge of the federal court in Australia
- Elizabeth Rata, New Zealand academic
- Elizabeth Rawson (1934–1988), English historian of Ancient Rome
- Elizabeth Ray, American beauty pageant winner
- Elizabeth M. Ready (born 1953), American politician
- Elizabeth Anita Reddi, Indian model and beauty queen
- Elizabeth Laurie Rees, temperance activist and social reformer
- Elizabeth Regosin (born 1967), American historian
- Elisabeth Mills Reid (1858–1931), American philanthropist
- Elizabeth Reifsnyder (1858–1922), American physician
- Elizabeth Reinhardt (1909–1954), American screenwriter
- Elisabeth Reiss (1902–1970), Norwegian pianist and cabaret performer
- Elizabeth Reller (1913–1974), American actress
- Élisabeth Renaud (1846–1932), co-founder, Groupe Feministe Socialiste
- Elizabeth Rhodes, British governess, housekeeper and Methodist leader
- Elizabeth Rice (born 1985), American actress
- Elizabeth H. Richard, American diplomat
- Elizabeth Riddell (1910–1998), Australian poet and journalist
- Elizabeth Rider, British actress
- Elizabeth Titzel Riefstahl (1889–1986), American anthropologist and archaeologist
- Elizabeth Riley, African-American abolitionist
- Elizabeth Robertson (born 1957), British geneticist
- Elizabeth Robins (1862–1952), American actor and feminist
- Elizabeth Robins Pennell (1855–1936), American author
- Elizabeth Roboz Einstein (1904–1995), American chemist
- Elizabeth Rochford (born 1960/1961), American judge
- Elizabeth Rockefeller Strong (1866–1906), eldest daughter of JDR
- Elizabeth Flynn Rodgers, Irish-American labor leader
- Elizabeth Rodriguez (born 1980), American actress
- Elizabeth Roemer (1929–2016), American astronomer
- Elizabeth Rood, American diplomat
- Elizabeth Rosenberg, American government official
- Elisabeth Rosenthal (born 1956), American physician and writer
- Elizabeth Rosner (born 1959), American poet
- Élisabeth de Rothschild (1902–1945), French baroness
- Elizabeth Rowray, American politician
- Elizabeth Ruth, Canadian novelist
- Elizabeth Ruth (pilot), American pilot
- Elizabeth Juliana Leeves Sabine, British translator
- Elizabeth Sackler (born 1948), American historian and philanthropist
- Elisabeth Sakellariou (born 1939), Greek architect
- Elizabeth Salmón, Peruvian legal scholar and rapporteur
- Elizabeth Salter, Australian biographer and crime novelist
- Elizabeth Saltonstall (1900–1990), American painter
- Elizabeth Samet (born 1969), American author
- Elisabeth Samson (c. 1715–1771), Afro-Surinamese coffee plantation owner
- Elizabeth Sandford (1797/1798–1853), British domestic moralist
- Elizabeth Sarancheva (1860–1923), general's daughter
- Elizabeth Sarnoff, American TV writer and producer
- Elizabeth Skidmore Sasser, architectural historian
- Elizabeth Satchell (1763–1841), English actress
- Elizabeth Sattely, American biotechnology engineer
- Elizabeth N. Saunders, American political scientist
- Elizabeth Sawyer Parisot, American pianist
- Elizabeth Scala, American medievalist
- Elizabeth Scarr, Australian scientist
- Elizabeth Schall, American singer
- Elizabeth Scheibel, American lawyer
- Elizabeth Scherer (born 1976), American judge
- Élisabeth Schmidt (1908–1986), French Protestant pastor
- Elisabeth Schmitt (1891–c. 1974), German-American lawyer
- Elizabeth Schofield (1935–2005), American archaeologist
- Elizabeth Scholtz, South African-American plantswoman and botanic garden director
- Elisabeth Schumacher (1904–1942), German artist, photographer and resistance fighter
- Elisabeth Schüssler Fiorenza (born 1938), German-American Roman Catholic theologian
- Elizabeth Seal (born 1933), British actress
- Elizabeth Searcy (1877–1965), American artist
- Elizabeth Sears, scholar of European medieval art
- Elisabeth Selbert (1896–1986), German politician and lawyer
- Elizabeth Sellars (1921–2019), Scottish actress
- Elizabeth Senior (1910–1941), art historian and assistant keeper
- Elizabeth Frances Sey (1927–1991), first female graduate of the University of Ghana
- Elizabeth Shanahan, American political scientist
- Elizabeth Sharp, American nurse
- Elizabeth Shepherd (born 1936), British actress
- Elizabeth Shepherd (musician), Canadian singer and pianist
- Elizabeth Sher, American filmmaker and artist
- Elizabeth Sherwood-Randall (born 1959), American government official
- Elizabeth Noble Shor (1930–2013), American historian
- Elizabeth Shortino, American economist
- Elizabeth Shove, British sociologist
- Elisabeth Sladen (1946–2011), English actress
- Elizabeth Slater (1946–2014), British archaeologist
- Élisabeth Sonrel (1874–1953), French painter and illustrator
- Elizabeth Sorrell (1916–1991), British painter
- Elizabeth Southwell (courtier) (1584–1631), English courtier
- Elizabeth Sparhawk-Jones (1885–1968), American painter
- Elizabeth Spayd, American media journalist
- Elizabeth V. Spelman, American philosopher
- Elizabeth Isabella Spence (1768–1832), Scottish writer
- Elizabeth Spender (born 1950), film actress
- Elizabeth Spiers (born 1976), American journalist
- Elizabeth Spires (born 1952), American poet and university professor
- Elizabeth Sprigge (1900–1974), English novelist, biographer, translator and children's writer
- Elizabeth Spriggs (1929–2008), English actress
- Elisabeth von Staegemann (1761–1835), German writer, painter, salonist and noble
- Elizabeth Parrish Starr (1889–1943), American heiress
- Elizabeth Stephens (born 1960), American artist and filmmaker
- Elizabeth Drew Stoddard (1823–1902), American poet and novelist
- Elizabeth Storie (1818–1897), Scottish writer, milliner and seamstress
- Elizabeth Storm (born 1958), American actress
- Elizabeth Streb (born 1950), American choreographer and dancer
- Elisabeth Strickrodt (1903–1971), German actress and princess
- Elizabeth Stride (1843–1888), the third murder victim of Jack the Ripper
- Elizabeth Strohfus (1919–2016), American aviator
- Elizabeth Stumm (born 1857), American teacher and journalist
- Elizabeth Sudmeier (1912–1989), American spy
- Elizabeth Sugrue (1740–1807), Irish executioner
- Elizabeth Sulcer, American fashion stylist
- Elizabeth Sung (1954–2018), American actress
- Elizabeth Sweeting (1914–1999), British arts administrator
- Elizabeth Tallent (born 1954), American novelist
- Élizabeth Tchoungui (born 1974), Franco-Cameroonian writer and economist
- Elizabeth Tennet, New Zealand politician
- Elizabeth Terrell (1908–1993), American painter
- Elizabeth Terry (born c. 1943), American chef
- Elisabeth von Thadden (1890–1944), German resistance member
- Elizabeth Thorn (1832–1907), American cemetery caretaker
- Elizabeth Thorndike (1642–1672), second wife of John Proctor
- Elizabeth Thornton (1940–2010), British-Canadian novelist
- Elizabeth Throsby (1807–1891), Australian survivor of the 1809 Boyd massacre
- Elizabeth Tilley (1607–1687), early English colonist in North America
- Elizabeth Tilley (journalist), Australian journalist
- Elizabeth Weston Timlow, American educator and writer
- Elizabeth Tisdahl (born 1946), American mayor
- Elizabeth Tookey (died 1773), British artist
- Elizabeth Toomey, New Zealand law academic
- Elizabeth Tori (born 1936), American politician
- Elizabeth Toth, public relations academic
- Elizabeth Sthreshley Townsend, American inventor
- Elisabeth Treskow (1898–1992), German goldsmith and jewelry designer
- Elizabeth Turnbull (1885–1988), New Zealand woollen mill worker and centenarian
- Elizabeth Tuttle, American women and eugenics study subject
- Elizabeth Twining (1805–1889), English painter
- Elizabeth Tylden (1917–2009), British psychiatrist
- Elizabeth Tyrwhitt (died 1578), English writer and courtier
- Elizabeth T. Uldall (1913–2004), American phonetician
- Elizabeth Underwood (1794–1858), pioneering Australian landowner
- Elizabeth Updike Cobblah, American art teacher and ceramicist
- Elizabeth Upham Yates (1857–1942), American lecturer
- Elizabeth Uviebinené (born 1992), British author
- Elizabeth Van Lew (1818–1900), American civil war spy
- Elizabeth Vandiver (born 1956), American classical scholar
- Elizabeth Vargas (born 1962), American TV journalist
- Elizabeth Varley (1909–2002), English actress and writer
- Elizabeth Varon (born 1963), American historian
- Elizabeth Chai Vasarhelyi, American film director
- Elizabeth Vassilieff (1917–2007), Australian artist, writer and peace activist
- Elizabeth Walton Vercoe (born 1941), American musical artist
- Elizabeth Verville, American civil servant
- Elizabeth Vesey (1715–1791), Irish socialite and intellectual
- Elizabeth Jane Via, American lawyer
- Elizabeth Vianna, American winemaker
- Elizabeth Vincent, British stage actress
- Elisabeth Vincentelli, journalist, blogger and podcast host
- Elizabeth Virgil (1903–1991), American educator
- Elizabeth Wallace (actress) (1933–2011), British actress
- Elizabeth Wallfisch (born 1952), Australian musician
- Elizabeth Wardle (1834–1902), English embroiderer
- Elizabeth Warlock, 20th-century British magician and author
- Elizabeth Kronk Warner, American judge
- Elisabeth Wärnfeldt (born 1956), Swedish author, opera and concert singer
- Elizabeth Waterman, American photographer
- Elizabeth Wathuti (born 1995), Kenyan environmental activist
- Elizabeth Watkins (1861–1939), Kansas philanthropist
- Elizabeth Watson-Brown, Australian politician
- Elizabeth Weaver (1941–2015), American judge
- Elizabeth Webby (1942–2023), Australian literary critic and academic
- Elizabeth Weber (born 1923), South African woman writer
- Elizabeth Webster, English actress
- Elizabeth Weed, feminist scholar and university administrator
- Elizabeth Weight, American politician
- Elizabeth Weir, Canadian lawyer and politician
- Elizabeth Mary Wells, British physician and missionary
- Elizabeth Ann Wells Cannon (1859–1942), American politician
- Elizabeth Wharton Drexel (1868–1944), American author and socialite
- Elizabeth Whately (1795–1860), English writer and wife of Dr. Richard Whately
- Elizabeth Lee Wheaton (1902–1982), American educator and novelist
- Elizabeth Whelan (1943–2014), American epidemiologist
- Elizabeth Whitby, 19th-century Australian who founded a school for girls in Adelaide
- Elizabeth Whitcraft (born 1961), American actress
- Elizabeth Whiteley, American artist
- Elizabeth Whiting, New Zealand costume designer
- Elizabeth Whitlock (1761–1836), English actress
- Elizabeth Whittaker, award-winning female American architect
- Elizabeth Hussey Whittier (1815–1864), American poet and abolitionist
- Elizabeth A. Widjaja (born 1951), Indonesian botanist
- Elizabeth Wilkins, American lawyer and government official
- Elizabeth Williamson (journalist), American journalist
- Elizabeth Wilmer, American mathematician
- Elizabeth Wilmshurst (born 1948), British civil servant
- Elizabeth Winder (born 1980), American writer
- Elizabeth Carroll Wingo (born 1970), American judge
- Elizabeth Winship (1921–2011), American journalist and advice columnist
- Elizabeth Winthrop, American writer
- Elizabeth A. Winzeler (born 1962), American microbiologist
- Elizabeth Wiskemann (1899–1971), English journalist and historian
- Elizabeth Witmer (born 1946), Canadian politician
- Elizabeth Wolgast (1929–2020), American writer and philosopher
- Elizabeth Wood-Ellem (1930–2012), Australian historian
- Elizabeth Woody, American painter
- Elizabeth K. Worley, American zoologist
- Elizabeth Wurtzel (1967–2020), American writer and journalist
- Elizabeth Yake, Canadian film producer
- Elizabeth Yianni-Georgiou, British make-up artist
- Elizabeth Yoffe, American film producer
- Elizabeth Zabaneh, Belizean politician
- Elizabeth Zachariadou (1931–2018), Greek historian
- Elisabeth Zaisser (1898–1987), East German politician and teacher
- Elizabeth Zarubina (1900–1987), Soviet spy
- Elizabeth Zechmeister, American political scientist
- Elizabeth Zimmerman (born 1948), Filipina former flight attendant and former wife of Philippine president Rodrigo Duterte
- Elizabeth Zsiga, linguist

== Disambiguation lists ==
- Elizabeth Adams, multiple people
- Elizabeth Alexander, multiple people
- Elizabeth Allen, multiple people
- Elizabeth Armstrong, multiple people
- Elizabeth Arnold, multiple people
- Elizabeth Austin, multiple people
- Elizabeth Bacon, multiple people
- Elizabeth Baker, multiple people
- Elizabeth Balfour, multiple people
- Elizabeth Ball, multiple people
- Elizabeth Banks, multiple people
- Elizabeth Barker, multiple people
- Elizabeth Barlow, multiple people
- Elizabeth Barrow, multiple people
- Elizabeth Bartlet, multiple people
- Elizabeth Bartlett, multiple people
- Elizabeth Bassett, multiple people
- Elizabeth Bell, multiple people
- Elizabeth Bellamy, multiple people
- Elizabeth Bennett, multiple people
- Elizabeth Benson, multiple people
- Elizabeth Bentley, multiple people
- Elizabeth Berg, multiple people
- Elizabeth Berkeley, multiple people
- Elizabeth Berridge, multiple people
- Elizabeth Bishop, multiple people
- Elizabeth Blackwell, multiple people
- Elizabeth Blanchard, multiple people
- Elizabeth Bonner, multiple people
- Elizabeth Boyer, multiple people
- Elizabeth Bradley, multiple people
- Elizabeth Brandon, multiple people
- Elizabeth Brice, multiple people
- Elizabeth Bridge, multiple people
- Elizabeth Brooke, multiple people
- Elizabeth Brooks, multiple people
- Elizabeth Brown, multiple people
- Elizabeth Browne, multiple people
- Elizabeth Bryan, multiple people
- Elizabeth Burke, multiple people
- Elizabeth Burns, multiple people
- Elizabeth Burton, multiple people
- Elizabeth Butler, multiple people
- Elizabeth Cairns, multiple people
- Elizabeth Campbell, multiple people
- Elizabeth Carey, multiple people
- Elizabeth Cary, multiple people
- Elizabeth Cavendish, multiple people
- Elizabeth Chamberlain, multiple people
- Elizabeth Chambers, multiple people
- Elizabeth Christie, multiple people
- Elizabeth Clark, multiple people
- Elizabeth Clinton, multiple people
- Elizabeth Cohen, multiple people
- Elizabeth Colbert, multiple people
- Elizabeth Coleman, multiple people
- Elizabeth Conway, multiple people
- Elizabeth Cook, multiple people
- Elizabeth Cooper, multiple people
- Elizabeth Cotton, multiple people
- Elizabeth Cowley, multiple people
- Elizabeth Cox, multiple people
- Elizabeth Craig, multiple people
- Elizabeth Crawford, multiple people
- Elizabeth Cromwell, multiple people
- Elizabeth Curnow, multiple people
- Elizabeth Curtis, multiple people
- Elizabeth Davies, multiple people
- Elizabeth Davis, multiple people
- Elizabeth Devereux, multiple people
- Elizabeth Devine, multiple people
- Elizabeth Dillon, multiple people
- Elizabeth Douglas, multiple people
- Elizabeth Downs, multiple people
- Elizabeth Draper, multiple people
- Elizabeth Drewry, multiple people
- Elizabeth Duke, multiple people
- Elizabeth Duncan, multiple people
- Elizabeth Edwards, multiple people
- Elizabeth Eliot, multiple people
- Elizabeth Evans, multiple people
- Elizabeth Fergusson, multiple people
- Elizabeth Ferris, multiple people
- Elizabeth Field, multiple people
- Elizabeth Fiennes, multiple people
- Elizabeth Finch, multiple people
- Elizabeth Forbes, multiple people
- Elizabeth Ford, multiple people
- Elizabeth Foster, multiple people
- Elizabeth Fowler, multiple people
- Elizabeth Fox, multiple people
- Elizabeth Fraser, multiple people
- Elizabeth Freeman, multiple people
- Elizabeth Fuller, multiple people
- Elizabeth Gardner, multiple people
- Elizabeth George, multiple people
- Elizabeth Gibson, multiple people
- Elizabeth Gordon, multiple people
- Elizabeth Gould, multiple people
- Elizabeth Graham, multiple people
- Elizabeth Grant, multiple people
- Elizabeth Green, multiple people
- Elizabeth Greene, multiple people
- Elizabeth Greenleaf, multiple people
- Elizabeth Grey, multiple people
- Elizabeth Gunn, multiple people
- Elizabeth Gunning, multiple people
- Elizabeth Hall, multiple people
- Elizabeth Hamilton, multiple people
- Elizabeth Hardwick, multiple people
- Elizabeth Hardy, multiple people
- Elizabeth Harman, multiple people
- Elizabeth Harper, multiple people
- Elizabeth Harris, multiple people
- Elizabeth Harrison, multiple people
- Elizabeth Harrower, multiple people
- Elizabeth Hart, multiple people
- Elizabeth Hartley, multiple people
- Elizabeth Hastings, multiple people
- Elizabeth Hay, multiple people
- Elizabeth Haynes, multiple people
- Elizabeth Hayward, multiple people
- Elizabeth Herbert, multiple people
- Elizabeth Hernandez, multiple people
- Elizabeth Hervey, multiple people
- Elizabeth Hill, multiple people
- Elizabeth Hoffman, multiple people
- Elizabeth Holt, multiple people
- Elizabeth Howard, multiple people
- Elizabeth Hughes, multiple people
- Elizabeth Jackson, multiple people
- Elizabeth Jacobs, multiple people
- Elizabeth Jenkins, multiple people
- Elizabeth Jennings, multiple people
- Elizabeth Johnson, multiple people
- Elizabeth Jones, multiple people
- Elizabeth Kelly, multiple people
- Elizabeth Kemble, multiple people
- Elizabeth Kennedy, multiple people
- Elizabeth Kent, multiple people
- Elizabeth Killigrew, multiple people
- Elizabeth King, multiple people
- Elizabeth Kite, multiple people
- Elizabeth Knight, multiple people
- Elizabeth Laird, multiple people
- Elizabeth Lamb, multiple people
- Elizabeth Lawrence, multiple people
- Elizabeth Lee, multiple people
- Elizabeth Leonard, multiple people
- Elizabeth Leveson-Gower, multiple people
- Elizabeth Lewis, multiple people
- Elizabeth Little, multiple people
- Elizabeth Lloyd, multiple people
- Elizabeth Lord, multiple people
- Elizabeth Lynch, multiple people
- Elizabeth Lyon, multiple people
- Elizabeth MacDonald, multiple people
- Elizabeth Marshall, multiple people
- Elizabeth Martinez, multiple people
- Elizabeth Mason, multiple people
- Elizabeth Matheson, multiple people
- Elizabeth McGrath, multiple people
- Elizabeth McGuire, multiple people
- Elizabeth McIntosh, multiple people
- Elizabeth McQueen, multiple people
- Elisabeth Meyer, multiple people
- Elizabeth Miller, multiple people
- Elizabeth Mitchell, multiple people
- Elizabeth Moore, multiple people
- Elizabeth Morgan, multiple people
- Elizabeth Morris, multiple people
- Elisabeth Murdoch, multiple people
- Elizabeth Murray, multiple people
- Elizabeth Neville, multiple people
- Elisabeth Nilsson, multiple people
- Elizabeth Owens, multiple people
- Elizabeth Page, multiple people
- Elizabeth Palmer, multiple people
- Elizabeth Paris, multiple people
- Elizabeth Parker, multiple people
- Elizabeth Parsons, multiple people
- Elizabeth Patterson, multiple people
- Elizabeth Pearce, multiple people
- Elizabeth Pearson, multiple people
- Elizabeth Penrose, multiple people
- Elizabeth Percy, multiple people
- Elizabeth Perry, multiple people
- Elizabeth Phelps, multiple people
- Elizabeth Phillips, multiple people
- Elizabeth Pickering, multiple people
- Elizabeth Plantagenet, multiple people
- Elizabeth Plunkett, multiple people
- Elizabeth Pope, multiple people
- Elizabeth Porter, multiple people
- Elizabeth Powell, multiple people
- Elizabeth Price, multiple people
- Elizabeth Putnam, multiple people
- Elizabeth Quinlan, multiple people
- Elizabeth Ralph, multiple people
- Elizabeth Read, multiple people
- Elizabeth Reed, multiple people
- Elizabeth Reid, multiple people
- Elizabeth Reynolds, multiple people
- Elizabeth Richardson, multiple people
- Elizabeth Roberts, multiple people
- Elizabeth Robinson, multiple people
- Elizabeth Rogers, multiple people
- Elizabeth Rose, multiple people
- Elizabeth Ross, multiple people
- Elizabeth Rowe, multiple people
- Elizabeth Russell, multiple people
- Elizabeth Ryan, multiple people
- Elizabeth Sackville-West, multiple people
- Elizabeth Savage, multiple people
- Elizabeth Scott, multiple people
- Elizabeth Sewell, multiple people
- Elizabeth Seymour, multiple people
- Elizabeth Shannon, multiple people
- Elizabeth Shaw, multiple people
- Elizabeth Shelby, multiple people
- Elizabeth Sheridan, multiple people
- Elizabeth Simpson, multiple people
- Elizabeth Smart, multiple people
- Elizabeth Smith, multiple people
- Elizabeth Somerset, multiple people
- Elizabeth Spencer, multiple people
- Elizabeth Stafford, multiple people
- Elizabeth Stakes, multiple people
- Elizabeth Stanhope, multiple people
- Elizabeth Stanley, multiple people
- Elizabeth Stanton, multiple people
- Elizabeth Stark, multiple people
- Elizabeth Stevenson, multiple people
- Elizabeth Stewart, multiple people
- Elizabeth Stone, multiple people
- Elizabeth Stuart, multiple people
- Elizabeth Tailboys, multiple people
- Elizabeth Tait, multiple people
- Elizabeth Talbot, multiple people
- Elizabeth Tan, multiple people
- Elizabeth Taylor, multiple people
- Elizabeth Thomas, multiple people
- Elizabeth Thompson, multiple people
- Elizabeth Thomson, multiple people
- Elizabeth Thynne, multiple people
- Elizabeth Tudor, multiple people
- Elizabeth Turner, multiple people
- Elizabeth Tyler, multiple people
- Elizabeth Walker, multiple people
- Elizabeth Ward, multiple people
- Elizabeth Warden, multiple people
- Elizabeth Warren, multiple people
- Elizabeth Washington, multiple people
- Elizabeth Watson, multiple people
- Elizabeth Webb, multiple people
- Elizabeth Webber, multiple people
- Elizabeth Wetmore, multiple people
- Elizabeth White, multiple people
- Elizabeth Whitehead, multiple people
- Elizabeth Williams, multiple people
- Elizabeth Willis, multiple people
- Elizabeth Wilmot, multiple people
- Elizabeth Wilson, multiple people
- Elizabeth Wong, multiple people
- Elizabeth Wood, multiple people
- Elizabeth Wright, multiple people
- Elizabeth Wyatt, multiple people
- Elizabeth Yates, multiple people
- Elizabeth Young, multiple people

== Fictional characters ==
- Elizabeth, from the video game BioShock Infinite
- Elizabeth, from the video game Persona 3
- Elizabeth, a muppet from the television series Sesame Street
- Elizabeth Afton, from the video game series Five Nights at Freddy’s
- Elizabeth "Lizzie" Bennet, from the novel Pride and Prejudice by Jane Austen
- Elizabeth Rose Bloodflame, VTuber from Hololive Production
- Elizabeth 'Betsy' Braddock (also known as Psylocke), from the comic book series X-Men
- Elizabeth "Betty" Brant, from the comic book series Spider-Man in Marvel Comics
- Elizabeth "Betty" Cooper, a main character in Archie Comics and Riverdale
- Elizabeth "Z" Delgado, the Yellow Ranger from Power Rangers SPD, played by Monica May
- Elizabeth "Betty" DeVille, from the animated television series Rugrats, voiced by Kath Soucie
- Elisabeth Doppler, from the sci-fi thriller series Dark, played by Sandra Borgmann
- Betty Draper, from the period drama series Mad Men, played by January Jones
- Elizabeth Drosselmayer, from the animated film Barbie in the Nutcracker, voiced by Kathleen Barr
- Elizabeth Fisher, a recurring character on the television series Gossip Girl
- Elizabeth "Lizzy" Griffiths, from the animated film Tinker Bell and the Great Fairy Rescue
- Elizabeth "Liz" Forbes, a major recurring character of The Vampire Diaries
- Elizabeth Harmon, from the novel The Queen's Gambit by Walter Tevis and the miniseries adapted from it, played by Anya Taylor-Joy
- Emily-Elizabeth Howard, from the animated television series Clifford the Big Red Dog, voiced by Grey DeLisle
- Elizabeth "Lizzie" James, a character in The Parent Trap
- Elizabeth Johnson, from the horror anthology series American Horror Story: Hotel, played by Lady Gaga
- Elizabeth Jones, from the novel Reviving Ophelia by Mary Pipher
- Elizabeth Keen, from the crime thriller series The Blacklist, played by Megan Boone
- Elizabeth Lavenza, from the novel Frankenstein by Mary Shelley
- Elizabeth Liones, main character in the manga The Seven Deadly Sins
- Elizabeth Lochley, from the sci-fi series Babylon 5 and its spin-off Crusade, played by Tracy Scoggins
- Elizabeth "Beth" March, from the novel Little Women by Louisa May Alcott
- Elizabeth "Bess" Marvin from the book series "Nancy Drew"
- Elizabeth "Lizzie" McGuire, from the teen comedy series Lizzie McGuire, played by Hilary Duff
- Elizabeth Midford, in the anime and manga Black Butler
- Elizabeth "Liz" Morgan, from the 2015 Disney film Bad Hair Day, played by Leigh-Allyn Baker
- Elizabeth Poldark, from the novel Poldark by Winston Graham
- Betty Rubble, from the animated television series The Flintstones
- Lisbeth Salander, from the Millennium trilogy by Stieg Larsson
- Elizabeth Shaw, from the film Prometheus, played by Noomi Rapace
- Elizabeth "Liz" Sherman, from the comic book series Hellboy
- Elisabeth Sparkle, main character in The Substance, played by Demi Moore
- Elizabeth "Lizzie" Stevens, one of Ross's students in Friends who briefly dated him
- Elizabeth Swann, from the Pirates of the Caribbean film series, played by Keira Knightley
- Elizabeth Thompson, main character in the anime and manga Soul Eater
- Elizabeth "Eliza" Thornberry, main character in The Wild Thornberrys, voiced by Lacey Chabert
- Elizabeth Webber, from the soap opera General Hospital, played by Rebecca Herbst
- Elizabeth Weir, from the sci-fi series Stargate Atlantis, played by Torri Higginson
- Elizabeth X, queen of Starship UK in the Doctor Who episode "The Beast Below"
- Elizabeth "Zee", a minor character from Monster House
- Elizabeth the Dragoness, from the Shrek universe, although she is much more commonly called simply "Dragon" with a capital D.
- Elizabet Héderváry, also known as Hungary from the 2009 anime Hetalia

== See also ==
- Ælfthryth, an unrelated Anglo-Saxon name, derived from the Old English Ælfþryð ('elf-strength'), superficially similar to Aelswith, Elspeth, and several other variants of Elizabeth. Later, it was more often rendered as Elfriede, Elfrida or Alfreda.
