= Elizabeth Read (convict) =

English-born prostitute transported to Australia

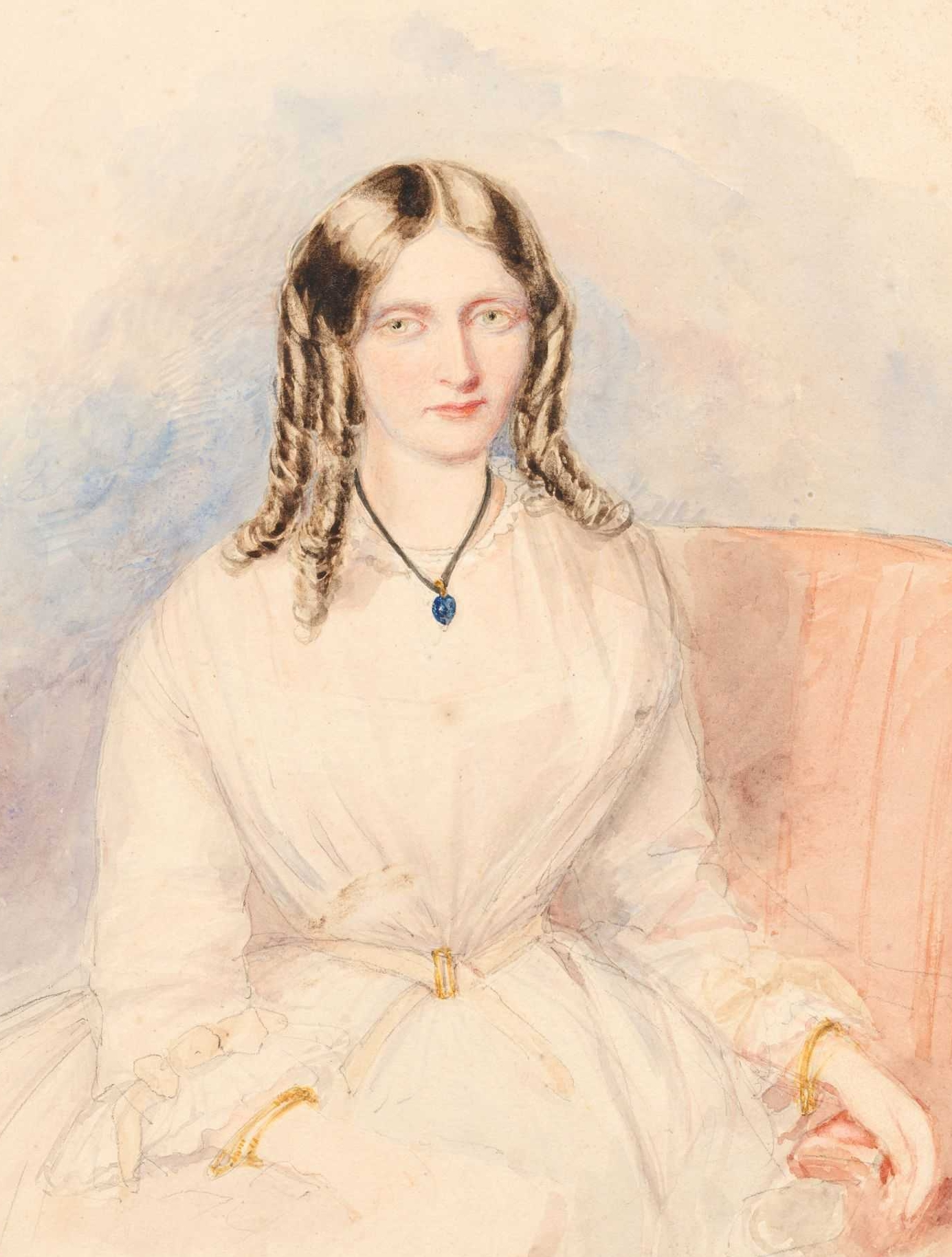
- Portrait of Read by an unknown artist, c. 1853, National Portrait Gallery
- Born: c. 1820; Yorkshire, England
- Died: 1884 (aged 63–64); Melbourne, Victoria, Australia

Elizabeth Read (née Archer; c. 1820–1884) was an English-born prostitute who was transported to Australia. She and 179 other female convicts arrived in Hobart, Van Diemen's Land (modern-day Tasmania), in 1841 aboard the Rajah, which has since become legendary by virtue of a patchwork quilt stitched by the convicts en route, now held at the National Gallery of Australia.

== Early life ==
Elizabeth Archer was born in 1820 in Dewsbury, Yorkshire, England, and soon after moved to Bradford. By the age of 20, she had been imprisoned several times for crimes such as drunkenness and being "lewd and disorderly". According to a newspaper account of one of her court appearances, Archer formed part of a "troublesome batch of prostitutes"; the Bradford Observer wrote that she "had long been on the pavé" (a streetworker). In July 1840, she and another prostitute, Ann Wright, were convicted of stealing money from a customer, the "unfortunately, if somewhat appositely-named" Joseph Muff. The judge, noting the pair's "long list of previous imprisonments", determined that they be "transported beyond the sea for the term of Ten Years". Immediately upon receiving the sentence, Archer clapped her hands and shouted, "and may you, you old grey-haired ____ sit there till I come back."

== Transportation ==
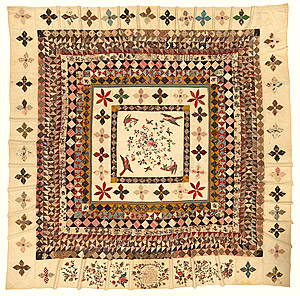
The Rajah quilt, National Gallery of Australia

On 5 April 1841, Archer and 179 other female convicts departed Woolwich aboard the Rajah for the penal colony of Van Diemen's Land (now the Australian state of Tasmania). The ship is best known for a patchwork quilt, now known as the Rajah quilt, that had been stitched on board by the convicts under the supervision of Kezia Hayter, the ship's matron. While female convicts on board other ships were provided with sewing materials as a means of promoting "order, sobriety and industry", the Rajah quilt, measuring 325 cm × 337 cm (128 in × 133 in), is the only documented quilt made by convicts en route to Australia that still survives. Originally owned by prison reformer Elizabeth Fry, the quilt is now held at the National Gallery of Australia and is regarded as a symbol of "the redemptive power of work, and of the grace and dignity that might be fashioned from graceless, undignified circumstances".

== Australia ==
After a 105-day journey, the Rajah ship arrived at Hobart, Van Diemen's Land on 19 July 1841. Within days of disembarking, Archer was assigned to Henry Brock, a surgeon-superintendent on a number of convict ships. In December 1841, she was reprimanded twice for "disobedience of orders", and, by January of the following year, she had served two ten-day stints of solitary confinement at "that receptacle of wickedness", the Cascades Female Factory. Over the next two years, Archer was sentenced to hard labour a number of times for misconduct, insolence, and refusing to work, but she nevertheless received a ticket of leave in December 1844 and married William John Read, an ex-convict who had been transported for life for theft. Granted a conditional pardon in 1849, Read left Van Diemen's Land two years later and went with her husband to Melbourne, in the Port Phillip District (modern-day Victoria).

Not much is known about Read's life in Melbourne, but she appears to have remade herself and, like many other Vandemonian ex-convicts who moved to the free colony of Victoria, "[traded] ignominious, forgettable beginnings for gentility and down-home respectability". An as-yet unattributed watercolour portrait of Read, thought to have been painted in 1853, was acquired by the National Portrait Gallery in 2017. According to curator Joanna Gilmour, the portrait, together with the Rajah quilt, provides a tangible link to a community of women "who would otherwise have been written out of history" and "alludes to a broader, intricate historical realm: demographics, patterns of settlement, the convict diaspora and colonial social mobility".

== See also ==
- List of convicts transported to Australia
