= Kezia Hayter =

English prison reformer (1818–1885)

Kezia Elizabeth Hayter
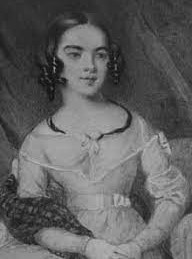
- Born: 29 October 1818; Hindon, Wiltshire, England
- Died: 30 December 1885; Woodville, South Australia
- Burial place: Cheltenham, South Australia
- Years active: 1840–1880
- Known for: The Creation of the Rajah Quilt
- Spouse(s): Charles Ferguson, 1843–1868
- Children: 7
- Relatives: Charles Hayter (uncle), John Hayter (cousin), Sir George Hayter (cousin)

Kezia Elizabeth Hayter (1818–1885) was a volunteer in prison reform in England. In 1841 she was matron on board the convict transport ship Rajah to Australia, where she lived for the remainder of her life. During the voyage, she was instrumental in the creation of the Rajah Quilt.

== Early life ==
Kezia Elizabeth Hayter was the daughter of Robert Holmes Hayter and Henrietta Hayter née Turner and was baptised on 29 October 1818 in Hindon, Wiltshire, England. She was the second eldest of four children. Details about Hayter's early life and upbringing are scarce; however, she does reflect in her diary on 12 August 1842 that:

What a strange position mine has been as a child. Though separated from my mother when very young I treasured her memory with idolatrous love though often my heart felt broken with what seemed to be her forgetfulness of me and I believed her to be everything that a christian ought to be - alas the bitterness this disappointment cost me God only knows.

Hayter was the niece of artist Charles Hayter and first cousin to Sir George Hayter and John Hayter. On 1 January 1842 she described Charles Hayter as her "...very dear Uncle" and had a close relationship with him that lasted until his death in 1835.

== The Rajah ==
By her early 20s Hayter was undertaking voluntary work at the General Penitentiary at Millbank for prison reformer Elizabeth Fry. She was selected by the British Ladies' Society for the Reformation of Female Prisoners to be matron on board the convict transport ship Rajah. She was given free passage on the understanding that she would "devote her time during the voyage to the improvement of the convicts". Due to Hayter's background and age she seemed an unlikely choice to be placed in charge of a ship-load of rough working-class convict women. She was instructed to assist Lady Jane Franklin in the formation of the Tasmanian Ladies' Society for the Reformation of Female Prisoners on her arrival in Hobart.

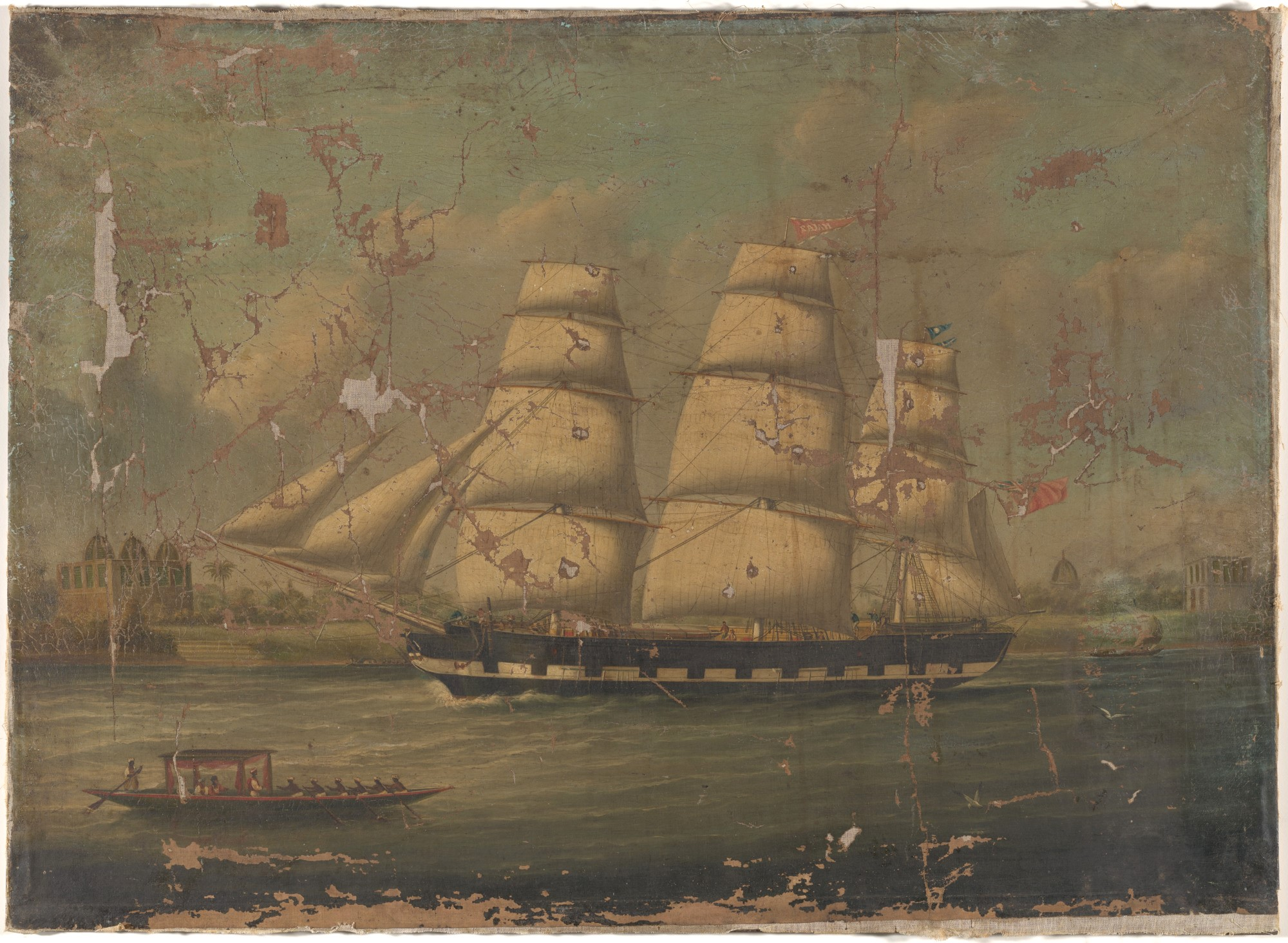
The Barque Rajah, by Unknown Artist (1839) National Gallery of Australia

The Rajah departed from Woolwich, England on 5 April 1841 with 180 female convicts on board, mostly from Millbank Penitentiary, and a few from Newgate. The British Ladies' Society noted:

The prisoners in the 'Rajah' were peculiarly favoured. A clergyman … went out in that ship as a passenger; and… the free passengers, the crew, and the prisoners, were assembled, as far as their several circumstances would admit, on the evening of each passing day, for the purpose of prayer and praise. Besides the advantage which the prisoners derived from the instruction given by the clergyman, they were also under the superintendence of a female of superior attainments, who had previously been an officer at the General Penitentiary…

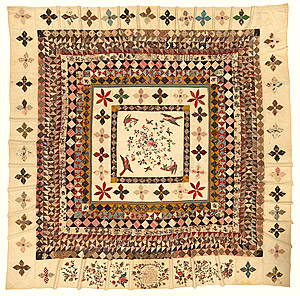
The Rajah Quilt, 1841

The Ladies of the Convict Ship Sub‑Committee supplied the convicts "with various articles of clothing, besides haberdashery, materials for needle‑work, and knitting, (in order to afford employment during the voyage) and with books of instruction, comprehending that most blessed book whose value the Committee are anxious should be rightly appreciated — the Holy Scriptures." It is unclear how many of the 180 female convicts contributed to the quilt (it has been speculated to be around 29) but by the end of the journey the project had been successfully completed.

The Rajah arrived in Hobart on 19 July 1841. The Hobart Town Courier reported "The female prisoners brought out in this ship appear to be of a much better character than usual; their behaviour during the voyage was very good, doubtless in a great degree the result of the indefatigable care which appears to have been exercised both with reference to their morality and physical comfort."

Four days after the Rajah arrived, the ship was visited by Lieutenant-Governor Sir John Franklin and his wife Lady Jane Franklin. Lady Franklin recorded the visit in her diary, stating that Hayter and the convicts presented them with a quilt made during the voyage.

Hayter became engaged to the Captain of the Rajah, Charles Ferguson. She would recall the romance in her diary in June 1842:

My beloved Charles this day twelthmonth in a walk with you on the poop of the Rajah you told me to make an entry in my journal to this effect that my fate was linked with yours and you bid me look at it at some future time to see if it were so…

== Life in Hobart ==
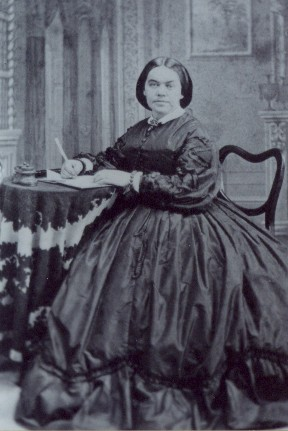
Hayter, circa 1850s

Three days after Hayter's arrival in the colony, Lady Jane Franklin invited her to join her at dinner and questioned her about Millbank Penitentiary. Franklin reflected "She [Hayter] has evidently strong sense, with most amiable and pleasant manners, with an intelligent countenance though plain."

Franklin invited Hayter to live at Government House and to be governess to her step-daughter, Eleanor Isabella Franklin. Hayter declined the offer and instead took up a position at Mrs Bettes School for Girls.

In 1841 Franklin and Hayter began to visit the Cascades Female Factory together. Hayter wanted the education and reform of prisoners, but Franklin wanted stricter treatment and humiliation; because of this, rumors quickly began to circulate that Franklin intended to introduce the Millbank System to the factory.

== Later life ==
Hayter settled in Williamstown, Victoria, when her husband Charles was made the Chief Harbour Master of the Port of Melbourne in 1852. She continued her community work as a member of the Williamstown Ladies' Benevolent Society, which was formed in 1856.

Charles Ferguson died in 1868 during a trip to London. In 1882 Hayter, along with her son George and daughter Sophie, moved to Adelaide, South Australia, most likely to be closer to her sister Henrietta White née Hayter.

Hayter died on 30 December 1885 in Woodville, a suburb of Adelaide.

== Hayter remembered ==
=== In books ===
- My Name is Lizzie Flynn: A Story of the Rajah Quilt by Claire Saxby (2015)
- Dangerous Women by Hope Adams (2021)

=== In the theatre ===
- Jane Franklin and the Rajah Quilt by Cate Whittaker (2024)
