= Elizabeth Reed =

Elizabeth Reed may refer to:

- Elizabeth Armstrong Reed (1842–1915), American Oriental scholar
- Elizabeth Wagner Reed (1912–1996), American geneticist
- In Memory of Elizabeth Reed, jazz-influenced instrumental from The Allman Brothers Band
- Betty Reed (1941–2022), politician

== See also ==
- Elizabeth Reid (disambiguation)
- Elizabeth Read (disambiguation)
- Betsy Reed, editor
