= Lydia Irving =

British philanthropist & prison visitor

- Born: 15 May 1797; Welbury, Yorkshire, England
- Died: 22 February 1893 (aged 95); Stoke Newington, London
- Occupations: Prison visitor and activist

Lydia Irving (15 May 1797 – 22 February 1893) was a British philanthropist & prison visitor. She was a leading Quaker and she worked closely with Elizabeth Fry seeking to improve conditions for women in prisons and on convict ships filled with those to be transported.

== Life ==
Irving was born in Welbury in Yorkshire in 1797 and she was raised by her Quaker grandparents. Her father was a clerk at a tea merchants.

In 1825 she joined the British Ladies Society for promoting the reformation of female prisoners which had been founded for years previously. She worked on outfitting ships working closely with Elizabeth Pryor who was ~26 years her senior. They were close friends and one account hints that they may have been lesbians. Irving got involved with the finances but she was a keen visitor to White Cross Street debtors' prison.

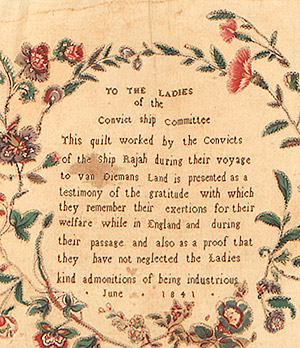
Embroidered thanks to the Convict committee as recorded on the Rajah Quilt in 1841 using materials organised by Irving

Irving served on the convict ship sub-committee and she had a financial success when she persuaded the Navy board to fund "gifts" for the transportees. These basic items included knives, forks, aprons and sewing materials. During the 25 years that Fry was involved 12,000 women were transported on 106 ships. The plan was to visit every ship on the night before it sailed to calm the women bound for Australia. William Evans, the surgeon of the "Lady of The Lake" noted the valuable worth of the Ladies Society and he singled out Pryor and Irving's work for praise. This ship took 142 days to transport 79 women convicts.

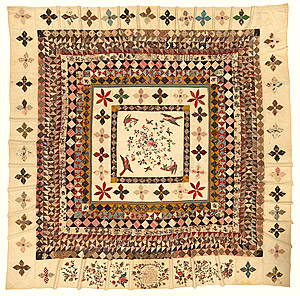
The Rajah Quilt's overall design

In 1838 the Friends sent a party to France. Irving went with Elizabeth Fry and her husband, and the abolitionists Josiah Forster and William Allen. They were there on other business but despite the language barrier Fry and Lydia Irving visited French prisons.

The convict sub-committee's work was singled out for thanks by the women on board the Rajah as it travelled to Australia. The convicts used the sewing materials to create an enormous quilt that is now regarded as one of Australia's most important textiles. The Rajah Quilt contains a message in the border giving thanks to the convict ship committee. The quilt was presented to the governor's wife Jane Franklin. The organisation of this quilt is considered to be Kezia Hayter who was the only free woman. She had come from the Millbank Penitentiary to assist Franklin in forming her own committee to mirror the one in the UK. The text on the quilt reads:

To the ladies of the convict ship committee, this quilt worked by the convicts of the ship Rajah during their voyage to van Dieman’s Land is presented as a testimony of the gratitude with which they remember their exertions for their welfare while in England and during their passage and also as a proof that they have not neglected the ladies kind admonitions of being industrious. June 1841.

The convict ship committee included Elizabeth Hanbury, Katherine Fry and Hannah Bevan. Hanbury would in time take over the organisation of convict ship visiting as Elizabeth Pryor was disowned after she asked the prison authorities for remuneration.

Irving's good friend Elizabeth Fry died in 1845 and the Ladies Society funded an Elizabeth Fry Refuge for the repentant. Irving worked closely with the committee that organised this. Irving went blind in 1877. The Ladies Society agreed to pay her a lump sum and a pension to thank her for her work.

Irving died in Stoke Newington in 1893.
