= Rajah Quilt =

1841 large quilt created by women convicts

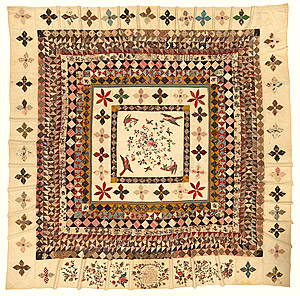
- Artist: Convict women on board the Rajah
- Year: 1841
- Type: Quilt
- Dimensions: 325 cm × 337 cm (128 in × 133 in)
- Location: National Gallery of Australia
- Owner: National Gallery of Australia

The Rajah Quilt is a large quilt created by women convicts in 1841 whilst travelling on the convict ship Rajah from Woolwich, England, to Hobart, Australia. It was created using materials organised by Lydia Irving from the convict ship subcommittee of the British Ladies Society for Promoting the Reformation of Female Prisoners. It is thought that the project was organised and overseen by Kezia Hayter, a free woman travelling on the ship. The quilt was presented to Jane Franklin, the wife of Lieutenant-Governor John Franklin on arrival in Australia. The quilt was later sent back to Britain for Elizabeth Fry, the leader of the British Ladies Society. The quilt's provenance was then unclear until it was rediscovered in 1989. It is now held by the National Gallery of Australia.

== History ==
Lydia Irving served on Elizabeth Fry's British Ladies Society for Promoting the Reformation of Female Prisoners convict ship sub-committee and she had a financial success when she persuaded the Navy board to fund "gifts" for the convicts. These basic items included knives, forks, aprons and notably, sewing materials. During the 25 years that Fry was involved with the organisation, 12,000 women were transported on 106 ships. The plan was to visit every ship on the night before it sailed to calm the women bound for Australia.

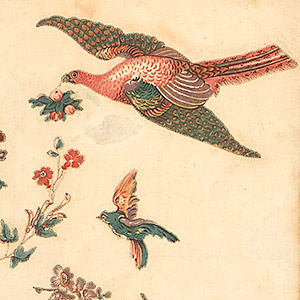
Detail of the Rajah Quilt

The sewing materials were supplied for the 180 women prisoners imprisoned on the ship Rajah. The women's names are still known. They had been assembled from across Britain, and they had been sentenced in Inverness, Aberdeen, Lincolnshire, Devon and the central criminal court. The ship set sail from Woolwich on 5 April 1841 and arrived on 19 July 1841 at Hobart in Tasmania. During the journey, some of the women embroidered and sewed the materials into an appliquéd coverlet now known as the Rajah quilt. The arranger of this quilt is believed to be Kezia Hayter who was the only free woman. She had come from the Millbank Penitentiary to assist Franklin in forming her own committee to mirror the one in the UK. It is thought now that about 29 women were involved. The convict sub-committee's work was remembered by the women on board. The quilt includes a message embroidered in silk thread giving thanks to the "convict ship committee". The quilt was presented to the governor's wife, Jane Franklin. The text on the quilt reads:

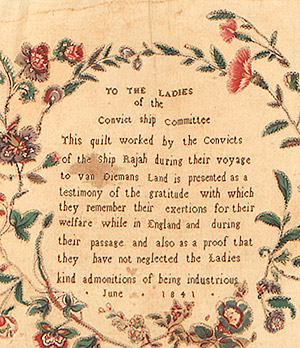

To the ladies of the convict ship committee, this quilt worked by the convicts of the ship Rajah during their voyage to van Dieman’s Land is presented as a testimony of the gratitude with which they remember their exertions for their welfare while in England and during their passage and also as a proof that they have not neglected the ladies kind admonitions of being industrious. June 1841.

The quilt was sent back to Britain for Elizabeth Fry (who led the British Ladies Society). The quilt was then forgotten until it was rediscovered in an attic in Scotland. It was returned to Australia in 1989. The quilt is now held by the National Gallery of Australia where it is the most requested work of art in the collection and was the key image in an exhibition A Century of Quilts in 2024.

Research shows that the quilt was not unique as other references are made to the convict women's needlework. One of the references is to the women leaving their work behind. However, this is the only documented quilt made by convicts that still survives.

== In fiction ==
The book Dangerous Women by Hope Adams (published by Michael Joseph in 2021) imagines the voyage of the Rajah and the making of the quilt.
