= Elizabeth Read =

Elizabeth Read may refer to:

- Elizabeth Read (convict) (c. 1820–1884), English-born prostitute who was transported to Australia
- Elizabeth Bunnell Read (1832–1909), American journalist and woman's suffragist
- Elizabeth Fisher Read (1872–1943), scholar and women's suffragist

== See also ==
- Elizabeth Reid (disambiguation)
