= Welbury =

Village and civil parish in North Yorkshire, England

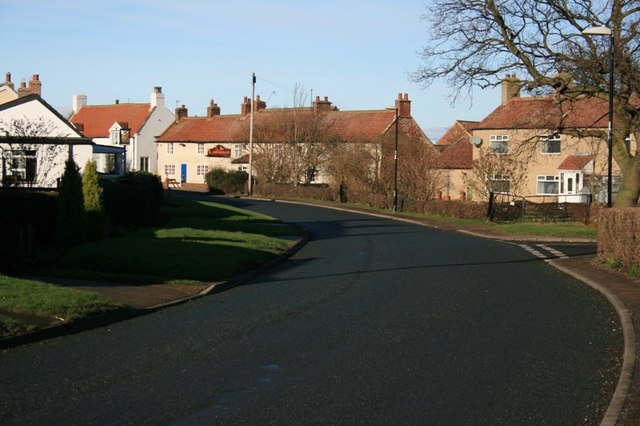

- Location within North Yorkshire
- Population: 259 (2011 census)
- OS grid reference: NZ399023
- Unitary authority: North Yorkshire
- Ceremonial county: North Yorkshire
- Region: Yorkshire and the Humber
- Country: England
- Sovereign state: United Kingdom
- Post town: Northallerton
- Postcode district: DL6
- Police: North Yorkshire
- Fire: North Yorkshire
- Ambulance: Yorkshire

Welbury is a village and civil parish in the county of North Yorkshire, England. It is about 1 mile (1.6 km) south of Appleton Wiske and 8 miles (13 km) north of Northallerton. From 1974 to 2023 it was part of the Hambleton District, it is now administered by the unitary North Yorkshire Council.

The village is mentioned in the Domesday Book of 1086 as having 6 Geld units for taxable purposes and King William being the Lord. The village was originally in the Union of Northallerton which was in the Wapentake of Birdforth. In 1319, the village and fields were destroyed by marauding Scots on their way to meet the English at what would become the Battle of Myton.

Since about 1800, the manor of Welbury has been held by the Earl of Harewood.

St Leonard's Church, Welbury is mediaeval and had renovations in 1815 and 1877. It is in the parish of Welbury in the Diocese of York.

Welbury used to have its own railway station just south of the village built by the Leeds and Thirsk Railway (later the Leeds Northern Railway) which later became part of the North Eastern Railway. The station opened in 1852 and closed to passengers in 1954. The line is still open and is served by Trans-Pennine expresses between Redcar and Manchester Airport via York and Leeds.

Welbury has a village pub, The Duke of Wellington, which dates from the 17th century and has been open in its current form since 2011 after an application to turn it into housing failed.

Welbury is featured on Darren Hayman's album, Thankful Villages Volume 1.

== People ==
- Lydia Irving, prison reformer, was born here in 1797

== Listed buildings ==
Welbury contains three listed buildings that are recorded in the National Heritage List for England. All the listed buildings are designated at Grade II, the lowest of the three grades, which is applied to "buildings of national importance and special interest". The parish contains the village of Welbury and the surrounding area. All the listed buildings are in the village, and consist of a church, its former rectory and an associated outbuilding.

Name and location	Photograph	Date	Notes
St Leonard's Church; 54.41374°N 1.38534°W		Medieval	The church was largely rebuilt in 1887, and is in stone with a slate roof. It consists of a nave with a south porch, and a lower chancel with a north vestry. At the west end is a double bellcote with ogee-headed openings and an embattled pediment. The porch is gabled, and contains a doorway with a chamfered surround, a pointed arch, and a hood mould, above which is a sundial.
Welbury House; 54.41344°N 1.38550°W	—	Early 19th century	A rectory, later a private house, in rendered red brick, with a Welsh slate roof, stone coping and shaped kneelers. There are two storeys, a double depth plan and three bays. The doorway is on the left return, and on the front are two full-height slightly canted bay windows containing sashes.
Stables, Welbury House; 54.41327°N 1.38525°W	—	Early 19th century	The stable and coach house are in red brick with a pantile roof, and three bays. The middle bay projects and has two storeys, a dentiled band, and a gable with stone coping. It contains a two-light horizontally sliding sash window in a blocked former carriage opening, and above it is a casement window with a flat arch. The outer bays have one storey and hipped roofs. Each contains a stable door and a casement window, the left door blind.

== Sources ==
- Historic England, "Church of St Leonard, Welbury (1190649)", National Heritage List for England
- Historic England, "Welbury House, Welbury (1150879)", National Heritage List for England
- Historic England, "Stables approximately 10 metres to south-east of Welbury House, Welbury (1190663)", National Heritage List for England
- Historic England (21 July 2024), Listed Buildings
- Grenville, Jane; Pevsner, Nikolaus (2023) [1966]. Yorkshire: The North Riding. The Buildings of England. New Haven and London: Yale University Press. ISBN 978-0-300-25903-2.
