= St Leonard's Church, Welbury =

Church in Welbury, North Yorkshire, England

Coordinates: 54.4137°N 1.3853°W

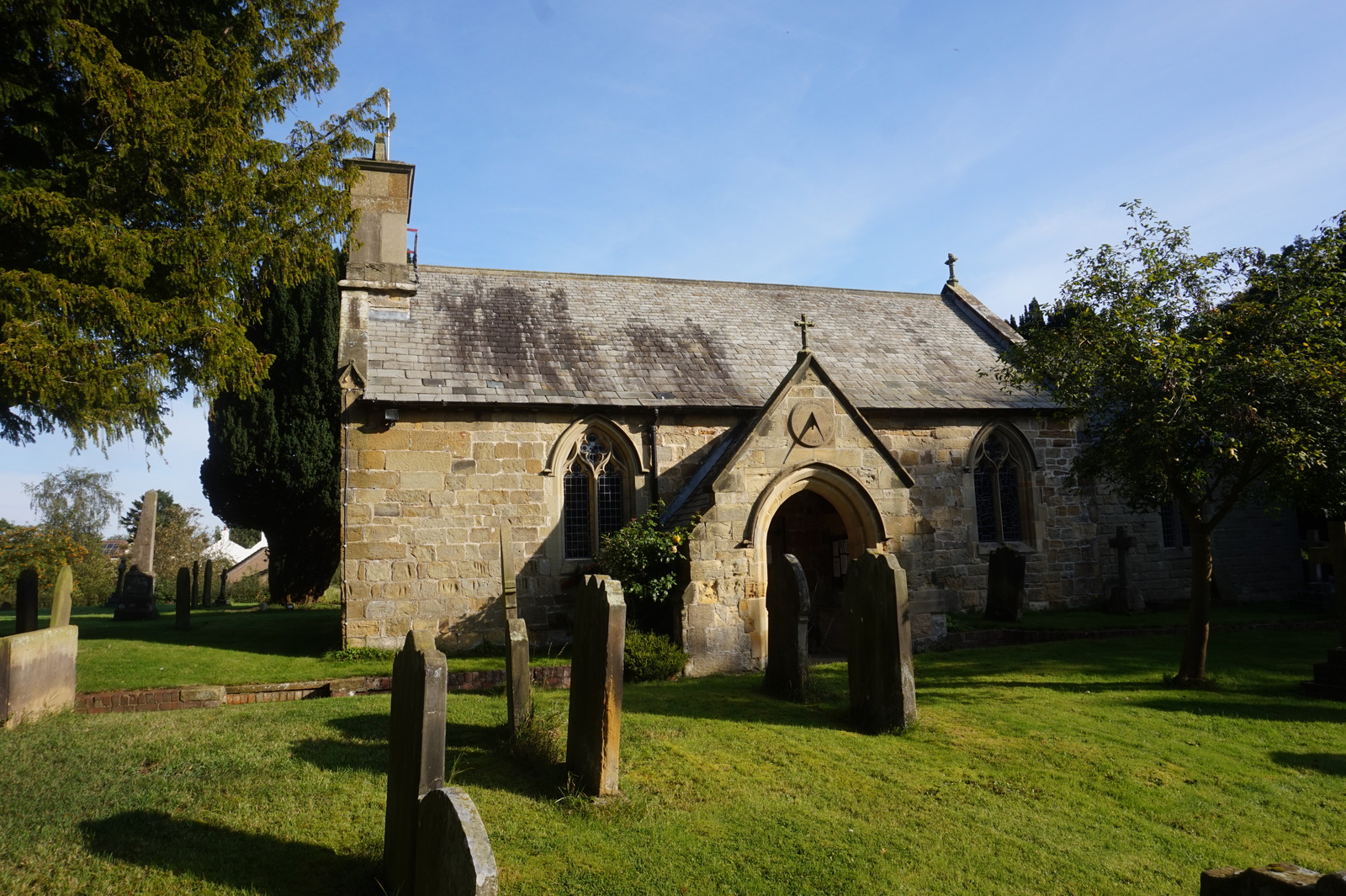
The church, in 2020

St Leonard's Church is the parish church of Welbury, a village in North Yorkshire, in England.

The church was probably built in the 12th century. It was largely rebuilt in 1815, then in 1877, William Searle Hicks rebuilt the chancel, leaving little of the Mediaeval structure intact. The building was grade II listed in 1970.

The church is built of stone with a slate roof. It consists of a nave with a south porch, and a lower chancel with a north vestry. At the west end is a double bellcote with ogee-headed openings and an embattled pediment. The porch is gabled, and contains a doorway with a chamfered surround, a pointed arch, and a hood mould, above which is a sundial. Inside are some reset 12th-century stones with zigzag carving.

== See also ==
- Listed buildings in Welbury
