= Elizabeth Reid =

Elizabeth Reid or Elisabeth Reid may refer to:

- Elizabeth Reid (volleyball) (born 1989), British volleyball player
- Elizabeth Reid, Lady Hope (1842–1922), British evangelist
- Elizabeth Anne Reid (born 1942), Australian feminist, development practitioner, and academic
- Elizabeth Jesser Reid (1789–1866), English social reformer, founder of Bedford College
- Elizabeth Julia Reid (1915–1974), Australian journalist and Grail movement leader
- Elisabeth Mills Reid (1858–1931), American philanthropist

== See also ==
- Elizabeth Reed (disambiguation)
- Elizabeth Read (disambiguation)
