= Whitecross Street Prison =

Debtors' prison in Islington, London

Coordinates: 51.5224°N 0.0926°W

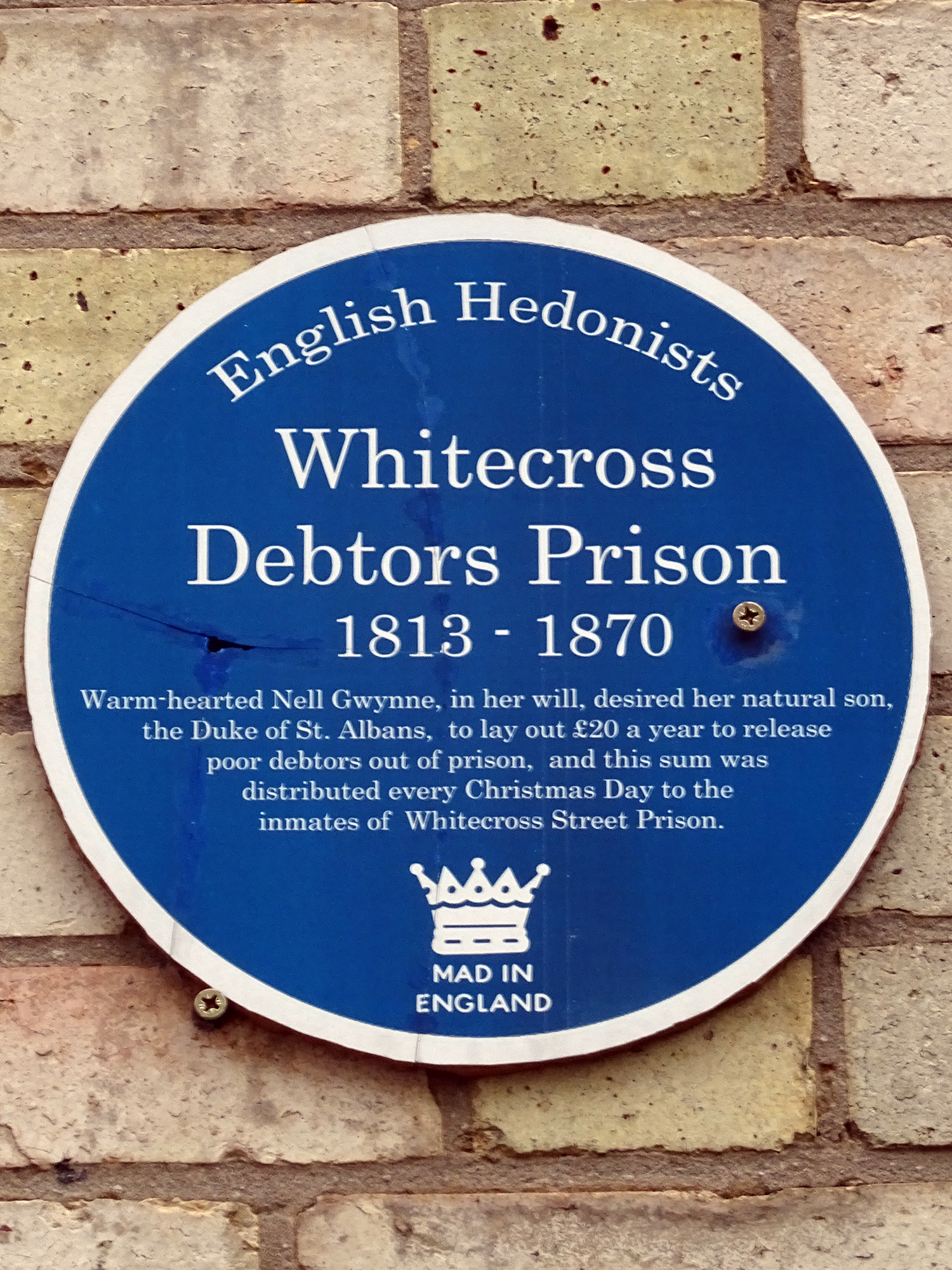
A Plaque marking the site where Whitecross Street Prison stood

Whitecross Street Prison was a debtors' prison in London, England. It was built between 1813–15 to ease overcrowding at Newgate Prison and closed in 1870, when all of the prisoners were transferred to the newly built Holloway Prison.

Situated on Whitecross Street in Islington the prison was capable of holding up to 500 prisoners, although in normal circumstances less than half that number would be held there. The prisoners were held in six separate 'wards,' and included a 'Female ward.' Known both as 'Burdon's Hotel' (after one of governors) and the 'Cripplegate Coffeehouse,' the prison seems to have had a worse reputation than the other London debtors' prison of the time due to the fact that it had common wards rather than individual rooms: "[the] prison inspectors thought that 'the crying evil of Whitecross-Street Prison is that the well-disposed debtor when so inclined, had no means of protecting himself from association with the depraved.'" This was one of the prisons visited by Lydia Irving as part of Elizabeth Fry's British Ladies Society for promoting the reformation of female prisoners in the 1820s.

A £20 payment known as 'Nell Gwynne's bounty' was given to inmates of Whitecross Street Prison each Christmas, a payment that could apparently be traced back to the long time mistress of King Charles II.

== In fiction ==
In his book "The Posthumous Papers of the Pickwick Club" Chapter 39 page 429 of the first edition, or Volume 2 Chapter 12 of the two-volume edition, published in 1836–37, Charles Dickens mentions the Whitecross Street Prison, to which one of his minor characters is to be sent, before Mr. Pickwick is persuaded not to go there, but instead chooses to be sent to Fleet Prison.
