= Hannah Rigby =

English convict transported to Australia

Hannah Rigby (c. 1794 – 10 October 1853) was an Australian convict who was notable for serving three separate sentences of transportation. By remaining in Brisbane when the penal settlement closed in 1839, she became one of the first permanent settlers in what is now Queensland.

Rigby was born in Lancashire, England, and worked as a seamstress and embroiderer. In 1815 she gave birth to a son, fathered by Joseph Barrow, a married comb-maker whose family owned a successful business. The Churchwardens and Overseers of the Poor ordered Barrow to pay maintenance, but whether he did is unknown, as is the fate of her child. In 1819 Hannah was twice convicted of larceny and served sentences of three months (from January) and then one year (from April). In July 1819 Hannah was again tried for larceny; she subsequently served a two-year sentence for the theft of one ornamental feather. In October 1821, she was convicted of larceny by a court in Liverpool and received a seven-year sentence of transportation. She reached Sydney in February 1823 aboard the Lord Sidmouth. A son, Robert Frederick, was born in 1824, fathered by free settler Robert Crawford. The following year, Rigby married George Page, a fellow convict. In September 1826, Rigby was arrested and charged with "absconding from service". She was subsequently confined to the Parramatta Female Factory for three months. Rigby obtained a certificate of freedom in 1828, by which point she had moved to Newcastle and given birth to a second son, Samuel.

In 1830, Rigby was charged with armed robbery for the theft of ribbon worth £1. She was again sentenced to seven years' transportation, and sent to the penal colony at Moreton Bay (present-day Brisbane). There, she was initially one of just 26 women, although the colony had over 1,000 male residents. Rigby gave birth to a third son, James, in 1832. She served her full sentence, returning to Sydney in February 1837 and obtaining another certificate of freedom the following month. However, three months she was convicted of stealing two hats and received a third sentence of transportation. Rigby arrived back in Moreton Bay in October 1837. The penal settlement was closed in 1839, but she was allowed to remain there as a servant of David Ballow, the district medical officer. Ballow successfully petitioned for her freedom in 1840, stating she had "conducted herself in the most exemplary manner". In 1842, when Moreton Bay was opened to free settlement, Rigby was "the only female convict remaining in the district". Little else is known of her subsequent life until her death from apoplexy in 1853. Her death was reported in the Moreton Bay Courier, which did not mention her status as an ex-convict.
