= Convict women in Australia =

Transportation of women convicts to Australia

Convict women in Australia were British prisoners whom the government increasingly sent out during the era of transportation (1787–1868) in order to develop the penal outpost of New South Wales (now a state of Australia) into a viable colony.

The women would be employed in 'factories' (equivalent of the English workhouse) but often had to find their own accommodation, and would be under great pressure to pay for it with sexual services. In this way, all the women convicts tended to be regarded as prostitutes. But it is a popular misconception that they had originally been convicted of prostitution, as this was not a transportable offence.

== Background ==
Owing to industrialisation and the growth of city-slums, as well as the unemployment of soldiers and sailors following the American War of Independence, Great Britain was experiencing a high crime rate around 1780. The prisons were overcrowded; there was no attempt to segregate the prisoners by their offence, age or sex.

In response to growing crime, the British government began to issue harsh punishments such as public hangings or exile. During the 18th and 19th centuries many prisoners were transported to Australia to carry out their sentence, a relatively small percentage of whom were women (between 1788 and 1852, male convicts outnumbered the female convicts six to one). The transportation system to Australia was based on a permanent removal of the convicts from Britain because even after their sentence was served, there were no British laws in place to assist their return to the British Empire. Convict women varied from small children to old women, but the majority were in their twenties or thirties. The British Government called for more women of "marriageable" age to be sent to Australia in order to promote family development for emancipated convicts and free settlers.

Despite the belief that convict women during the transportation period were all prostitutes, no women were transported for that offence. The majority of women sent to Australia were convicted of what would now be considered minor offences (such as petty theft), most did not receive sentences of more than seven years. Many women were driven to prostitution upon their arrival in Australia as means of survival because they were often required to house themselves or buy clothing and bedding on their own.

== Voyage ==
The First Fleet was the first flotilla of ships to transport convicts to Australia, it sailed in 1787. Ships continued to transport convicts to Western Australia until 1868. The beginning of the transportation years brought ships at inconsistent times and the death rate on these ships remained high; in the Second Fleet, 267 out of 1,006 prisoners died at sea. However, at the peak of transportation, the death rate was a little more than one percent.

Ralph Clark, an officer on board the Friendship in the First Fleet, kept a journal of his journey to Australia. In his journal, he described the women on board as "abandoned wenches", contrasting their characteristics with the supposed virtues of his wife in England. At one stage, after several male convicts were caught in the place where the female convicts were lodged, Clark wrote: "I hope this will be a warning to them from coming into the whore camp—I would call it by the Name of Sodem [sic] for ther[e] is more Sin committed in it than in any other part of the world".

Elizabeth Fry's British Ladies Society cared for women convicts. They had a convict ship sub-committee that persuaded the Navy board to fund "gifts" for the transportees. These items included knives, forks, aprons and sewing materials. During the 25 years that Fry was involved 12,000 women were transported on 106 ships. The society's plan was to visit every ship on the night before it sailed to calm the women. William Evans, the surgeon of the "Lady of The Lake" noted the valuable worth of the Ladies Society and he singled out Pryor and Lydia Irving's work for praise.

Some seamen developed relationships with the women whilst on the voyage. Women used their bodies as a way of bettering their conditions. On the Lady Juliana, a ship in the Second Fleet, female convicts began to pair off with the seamen. John Nicol, a Scottish steward recalled, "Every man on board took a wife from among the convicts, they nothing loath." These relationships were not always just sexual. Nicol himself expresses his desire to marry and bring back to England his convict "wife", Sarah Whitlam, after her release.

== Female factories ==
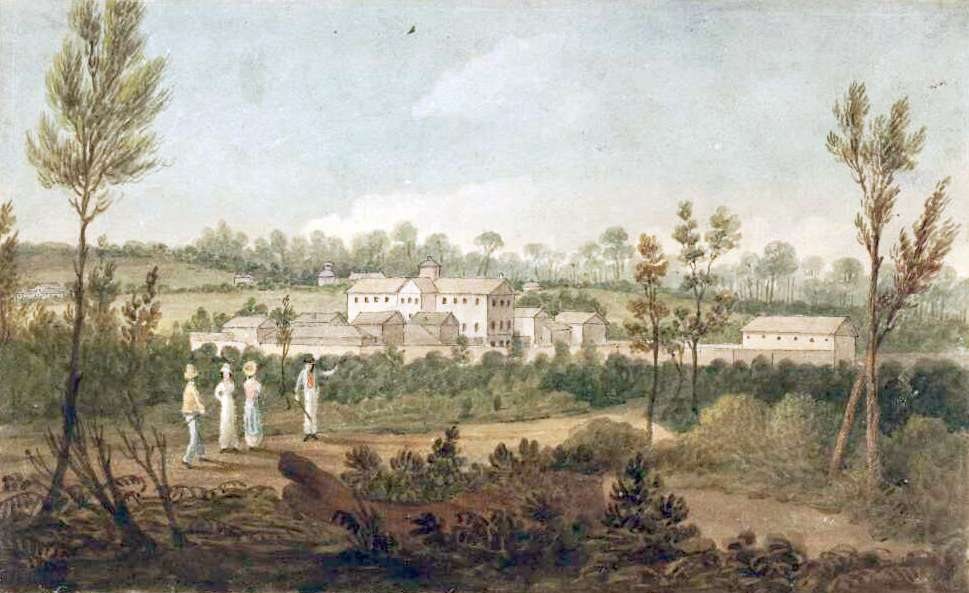
Parramatta Female Factory, painted by Augustus Earle, c. 1826

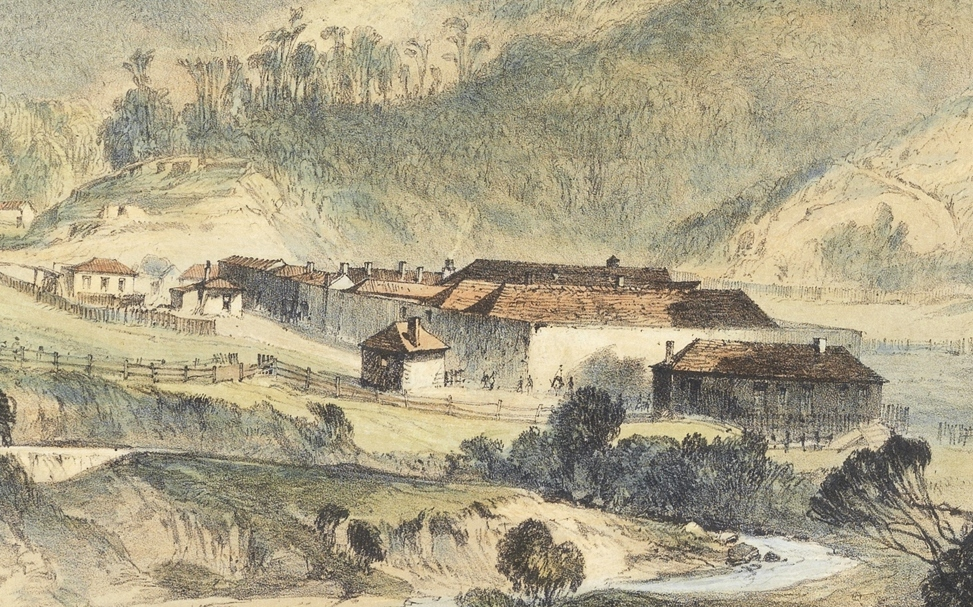
Detail of a lithograph by John Skinner Prout showing the Cascades Female Factory, 1844

Female factories were detention centers for women convicts transported to the penal colonies of New South Wales and Van Diemen's Land. This system was based on British bridewells, prisons and workhouses. Starting from 1829, the female factories were established as a loose network of women's prisons which existed until the British transport of convicts to Van Diemen's Land ended in 1855.

An estimated 9,000 convict women were in the 13 female factories. An estimated 1 in 5 to 1 in 7 Australians are related to these women.

Women were sent to the female factories while awaiting assignment to a household or while awaiting childbirth or weaning or as punishment.

=== Work environment ===
They were called factories because the women were expected to work and because they also employed free working women. Task work was established in female factories in 1849, requiring the occupants to do chores, needle-work and washing. If extra work was done, the convict's sentence might be shortened. The women produced spun wool and flax in all the factories. In the main factories other work was undertaken such as sewing, stocking knitting and straw plaiting. Hard labour included rock breaking and oakum picking.

Meanwhile, convict men mainly worked on the construction of roads, bridges, buildings and coastal infrastructure. Punishments for misconduct in the factories were often humiliating, a common one was to shave the woman's head.

=== Parramatta Female Factory ===
The Parramatta female factory was the first built in Australia and was located in Parramatta, New South Wales. The factory had room for only a third of the female prisoners; the rest had to find lodgings with the local settlers at some cost (usually about four shillings a week). Many women could only pay for this cost by offering sexual services. Their customers were usually the male convicts who came and left the factory as they pleased. The occupants were not given mattresses or blankets to sleep on and the social conditions inside were indecent.

In 1819 Macquarie had ex-convict Francis Greenway create a new design for the factory. This new design had the inmates divided into three categories: the "general", "merit" and "crime" class. The "crime" class women had their hair cropped as a mark of disgrace and were the incorrigibles. The "merit" or first class comprised women who had been well behaved for at least six months and women who had recently arrived from England. These girls were eligible to marry and eligible for assignment. The second or "general" class was made up of women who were sentenced for minor offences and could be transferred to the first class after a period of probation. This class consisted of many women who had become pregnant during their assigned service. The factory at Parramatta was a source of wives for settlers and emancipated convicts. With a written permit from the Reverend Samuel Marsden and a written note to the matron, a bachelor could take his pick of a willing "factory lass."

=== Ross Female Factory ===
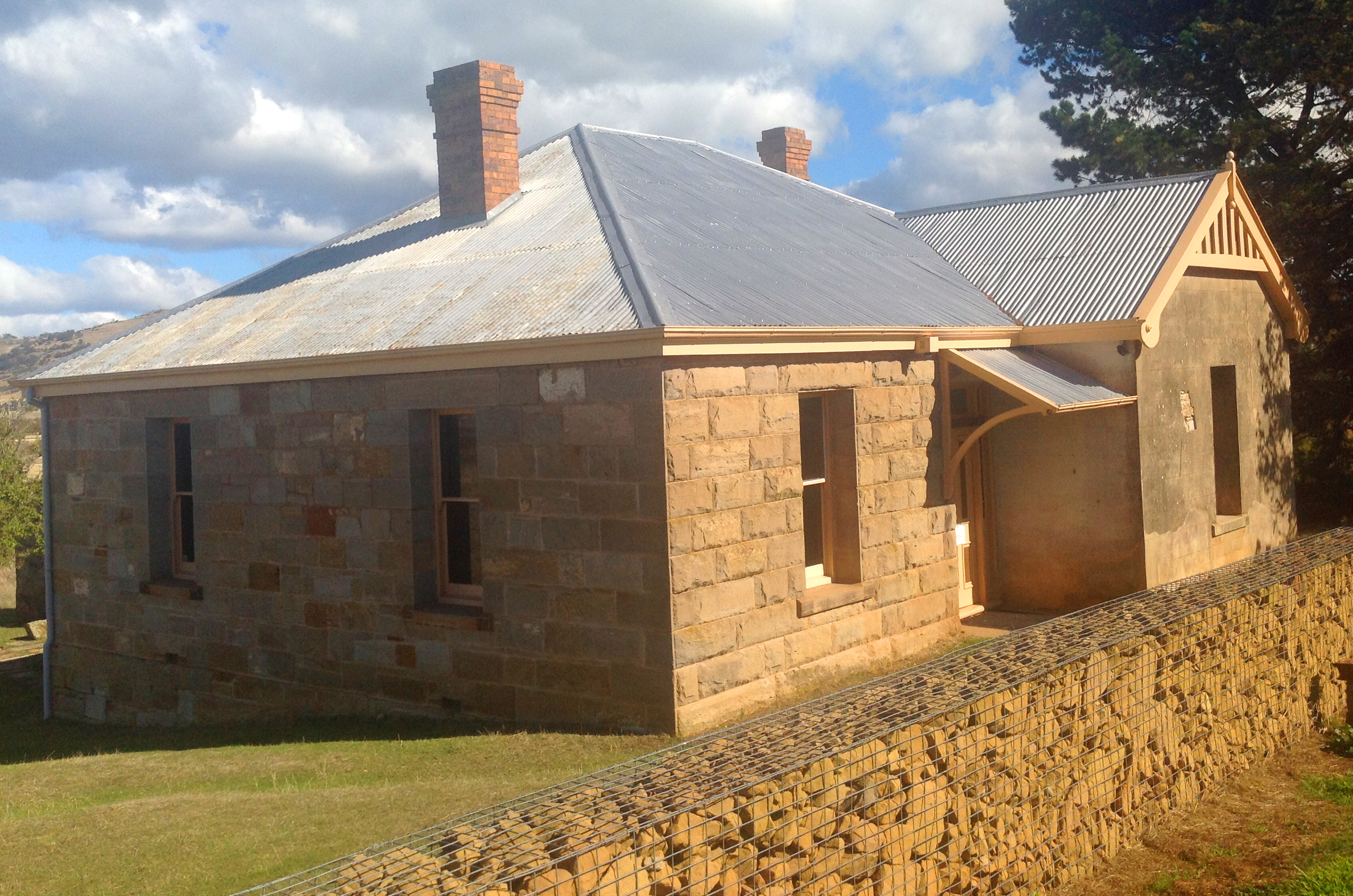
Ross Female Factory: The Overseer's Cottage, the only building remaining

The Ross Female Factory was located on the British island colony Tasmania. The convicted women were taught how to sew, clean, cook and launder. There is archaeological evidence for the existence of a barter economy existing between inmates and guards. A total area of 105 m^{2} (1,130 sq ft) was excavated at Ross Factory between 1995 and 1999. The archaeological remains point towards the inmates having traded buttons in turn for tobacco, alcohol and sexual activities. Several court testimonies of convict women provide evidence for same-sex activity between the inmates in exchange for barter goods as well. A high number and diversity of buttons was found inside the cells of the women together with tobacco pipes and alcohol glass containers. The black market is a form of covert resistance that the female inmates showed. More overt forms of resistance include arson and vandalism inside of their cells. Archaeological excavations have found that the floor in a solitary cell in Ross Factory was composed of almost 60% charcoal which provides evidence for a fire that has struck inside. Common punishments for women caught resisting in prison were solitary confinement, iron neck collars and public humiliation.

=== Other sites ===
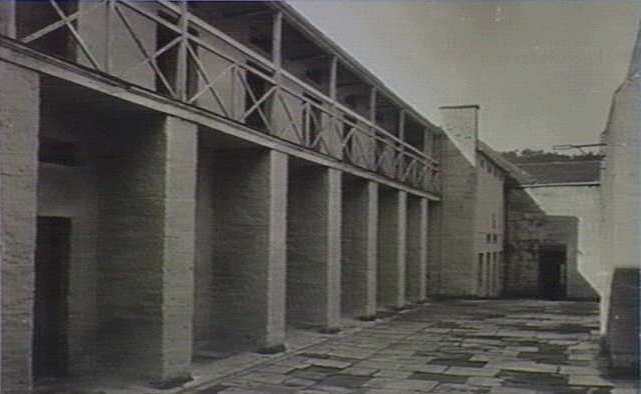
Cascades Female Factory

- Newcastle, New South Wales
- Port Macquarie, New South Wales (2 factories)
- Moreton Bay, Queensland
- Cascades Female Factory, Tasmania

== Family and marriage ==
Marriage between male and female convicts and raising a family was encouraged because of the government's intentions of developing a free colony. It was the objective of the British government to establish a colony in Australia rather than have it remain as a penal settlement. This compelled the government to send more women to Australia as a way of establishing a native population. On the arrival of 'female' ships, colonists would swarm to the dock to bargain for a servant. High-ranking officers had first pick. Some women were taken as mistresses, others as servants. There were no legal ties for these assignments, so a settler could dismiss a convict woman freely. When this did occur, it created a class of woman who often resorted to prostitution in order to feed and house themselves properly.

Male convicts had the chance to select a bride from the female factories by a system called 'convict courtship'. The male convicts came to the female factories to inspect the women, who had to line up for the occasion. If the male convict saw a woman that he liked, he made a motion at her to signal that he wanted to choose her. Most women accepted the offering. This process was often described as similar to the one in which slaves were selected.

The Reverend Samuel Marsden categorized the women convicts into being married or prostitutes. If a woman were to have a relationship out of wedlock, Marsden considered this whoredom. Many couples lived and cohabited together monogamously without being officially married, yet these women were recorded as being prostitutes. The women were scarred from being convicted and could not redeem their status because it differed so greatly from the British ideal of a woman, who was virtuous, polite and a woman of the family.

== Convict population of New South Wales during the period ==
Year	Males	Females	Total
1788	529	188	717
1790	297	70	367
1800	1,230	328	1,558
1805	1,561	516	2,077
1819	8,920	1,066	9,986
1828	16,442	1,544	17,986
1836	25,254	2,577	27,831
1841	23,844	3,133	26,977

== List of notable convict women ==
- Esther Abrahams
- Charlotte Badger
- Ruth Bowyer
- Mary Bryant
- Margaret Catchpole
- Margaret Dawson
- Ann Dinham
- Mary Hyde
- Maria Lord
- Molly Morgan
- Mary Reibey
- Hannah Rigby
- Elizabeth Steel
- Mary Wade
- Frances Williams
- Ellen Fraser (nee Redchester). (November 1764 - 8 November 1840). Mother of the second child of British parents born in the colony (John Fraser 7 June 1889). She was married to William Fraser on 8 November 1783. They were both transported for petty larceny, Ellen aboard the "Prince of Wales" and William aboard the "Charlotte". on 13 August 1787, whilst on a stop over in Rio, Ellen was transferred to "Charlotte" to join her husband. She is the first woman to own freehold land in the colony, being granted an initial 20 acres at Concord on 20 February 1791. The land now forms a part of the Concord Golf Club.

== Legacy ==
Mary Reibey has featured on the obverse of Australian twenty-dollar note since 1994.

The Incredible Journey of Mary Bryant, a British-Australian film based on the life of Mary Bryant, was released in 2005.
