= John Hayter =

English painter (1800–1895)

John Hayter RA
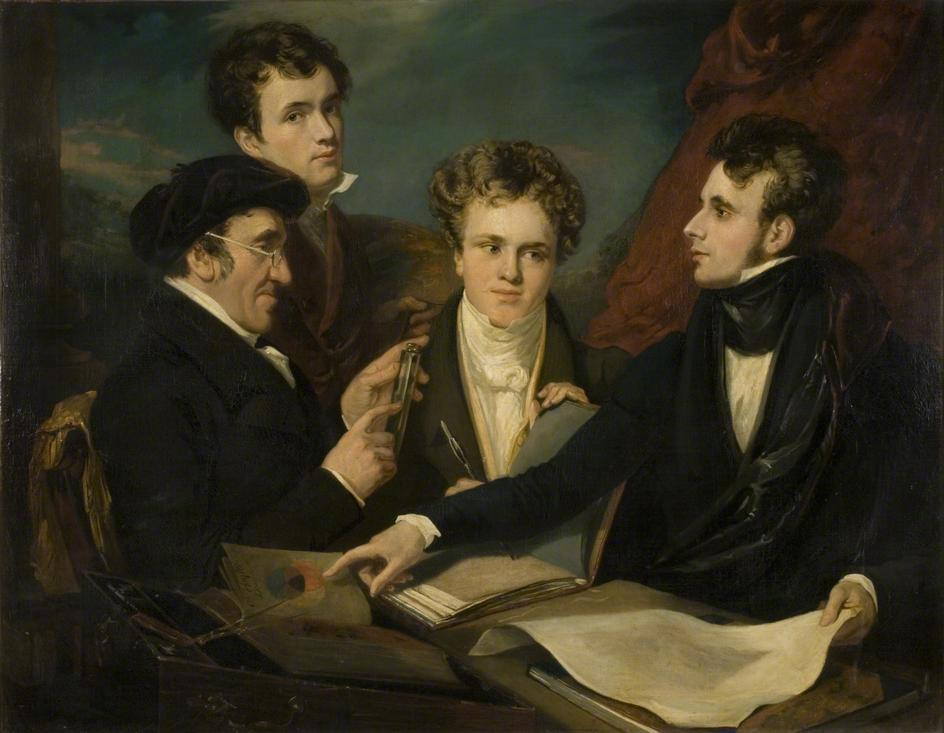
- A Controversy on Colour, by John Hayter showing from left to right Charles Hayter (father of John and George), John Hayter, Edwin Landseer and George Hayter (Shipley Art Gallery, UK)
- Born: John Hayter; 21 October 1800; Marylebone, London, England
- Died: 3 June 1895 (aged 94); Brompton, Kent, England
- Known for: Painter
- Parent(s): Charles Hayter; Martha Stevenson
- Relatives: George Hayter (brother)
- Patrons: Queen Victoria

John Hayter RA (21 October 1800 – 3 June 1895) was an English portrait painter who was Painter-in-Ordinary to Queen Victoria, whom he first painted when she was 12 years old.

== Early life and education ==
Hayter was born on 21 October 1800 in Marylebone, London. He was the second son of the miniaturist Charles Hayter and brother of Sir George Hayter, also a portraitist. He entered the Royal Academy schools in 1815, and began to exhibit at the Royal Academy in the same year. He also exhibited work at the British Institution and the Royal Society of British Artists.

== Career ==
Hayter established himself during the 1820s, with portraits of notable figures such as the Duke of Wellington and the opera singer, Giuditta Pasta. His portrait drawings, in chalks or crayons, became particularly popular, a number of them being engraved for The Court Album, which contained portraits of the female aristocracy (1850–57).

== Death ==
Hayter died on 3 June 1895 in Brompton, Kent.

== Gallery ==
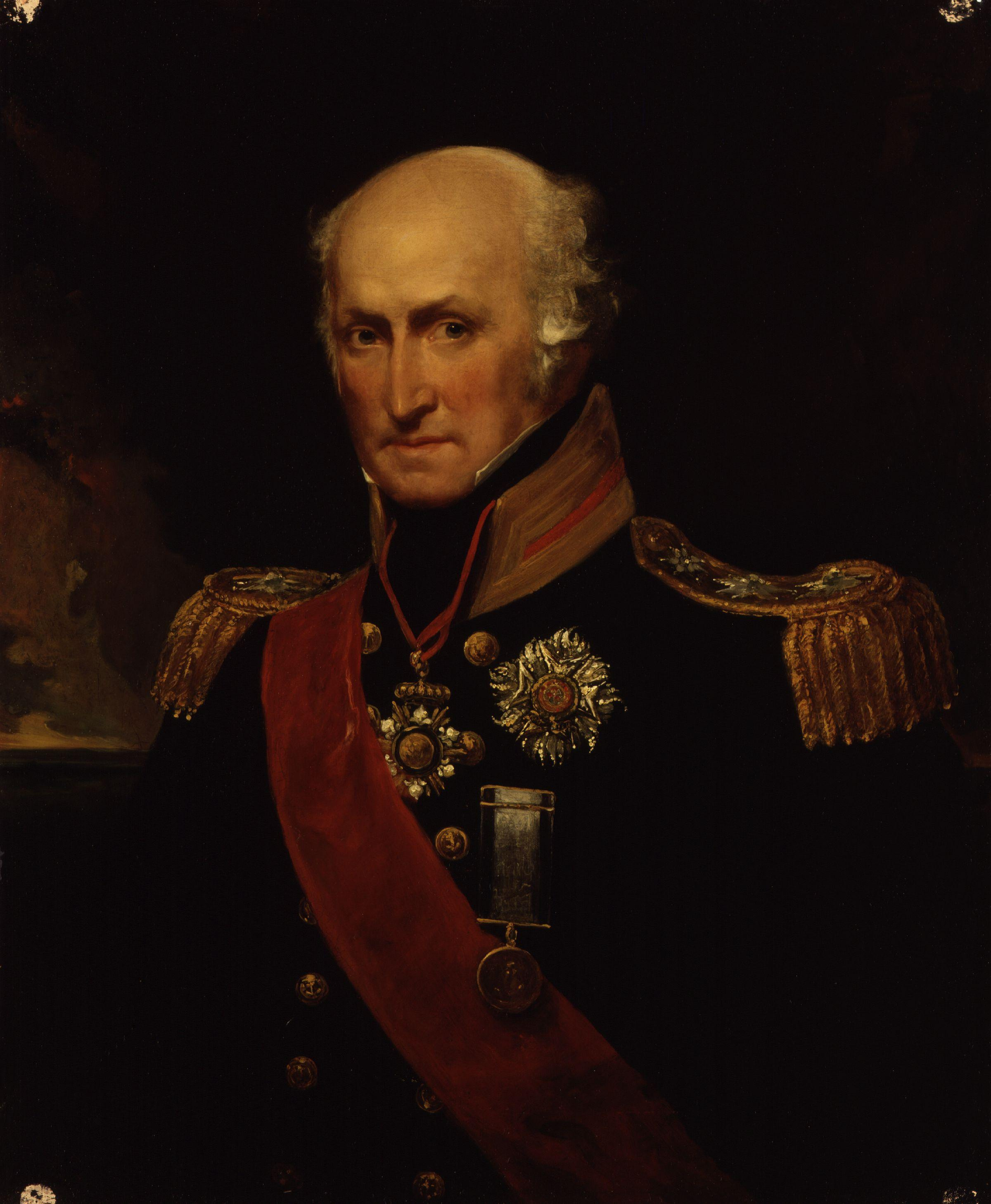
Admiral Sir Benjamin Carew c 1833

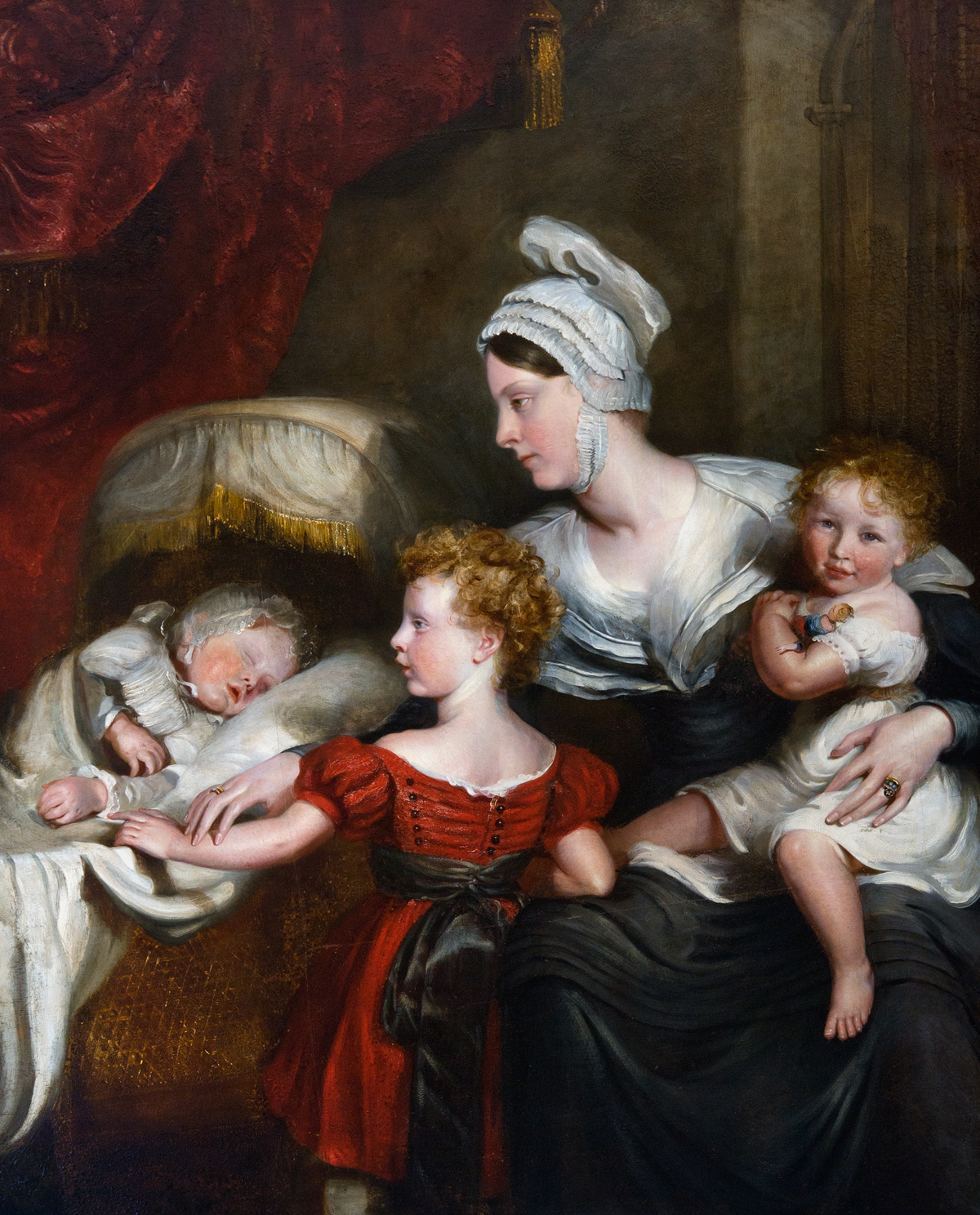
Lady Augusta FitzClarence and children

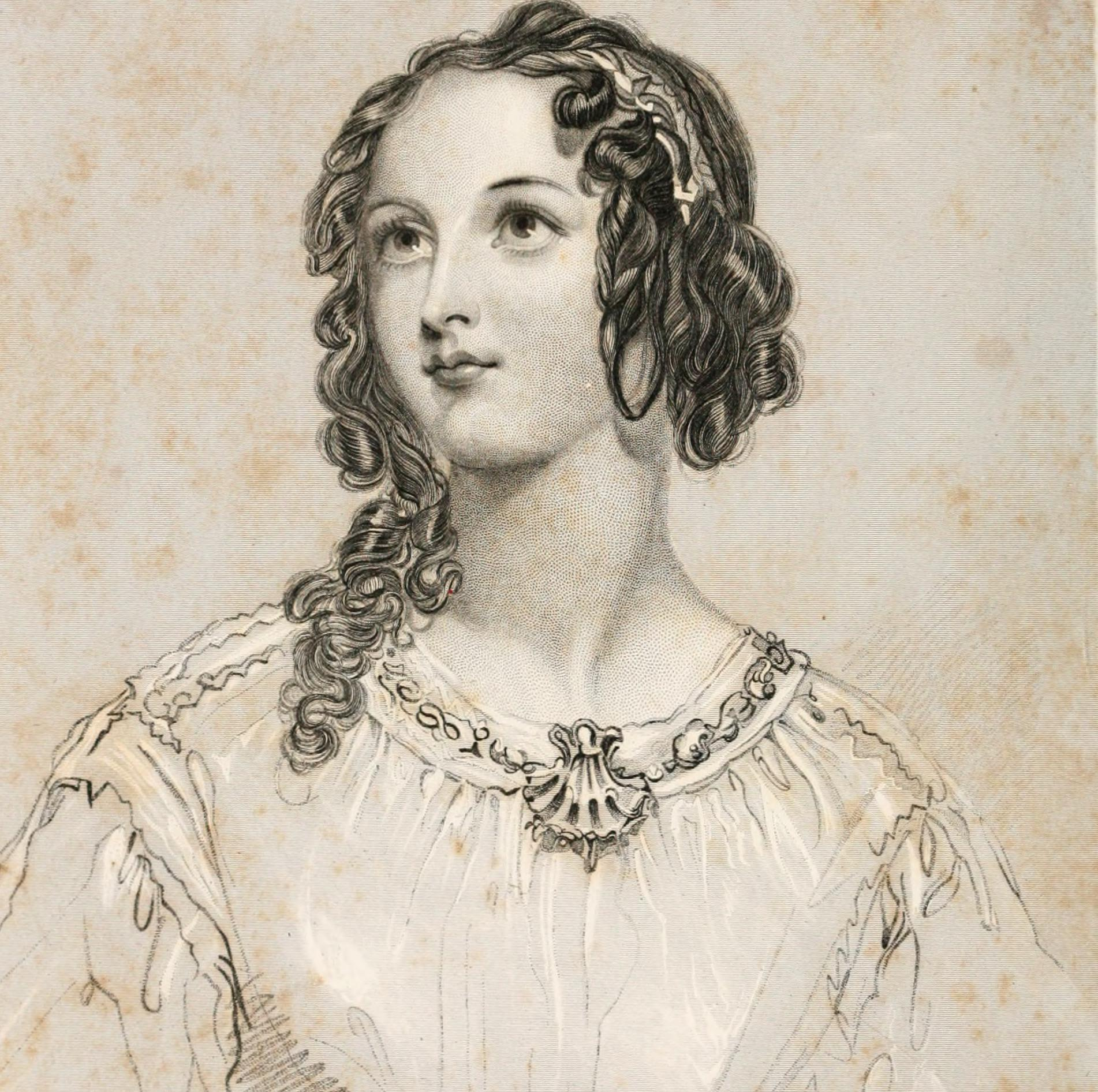
Characteristics of women - moral, poetical, and historical (1853)

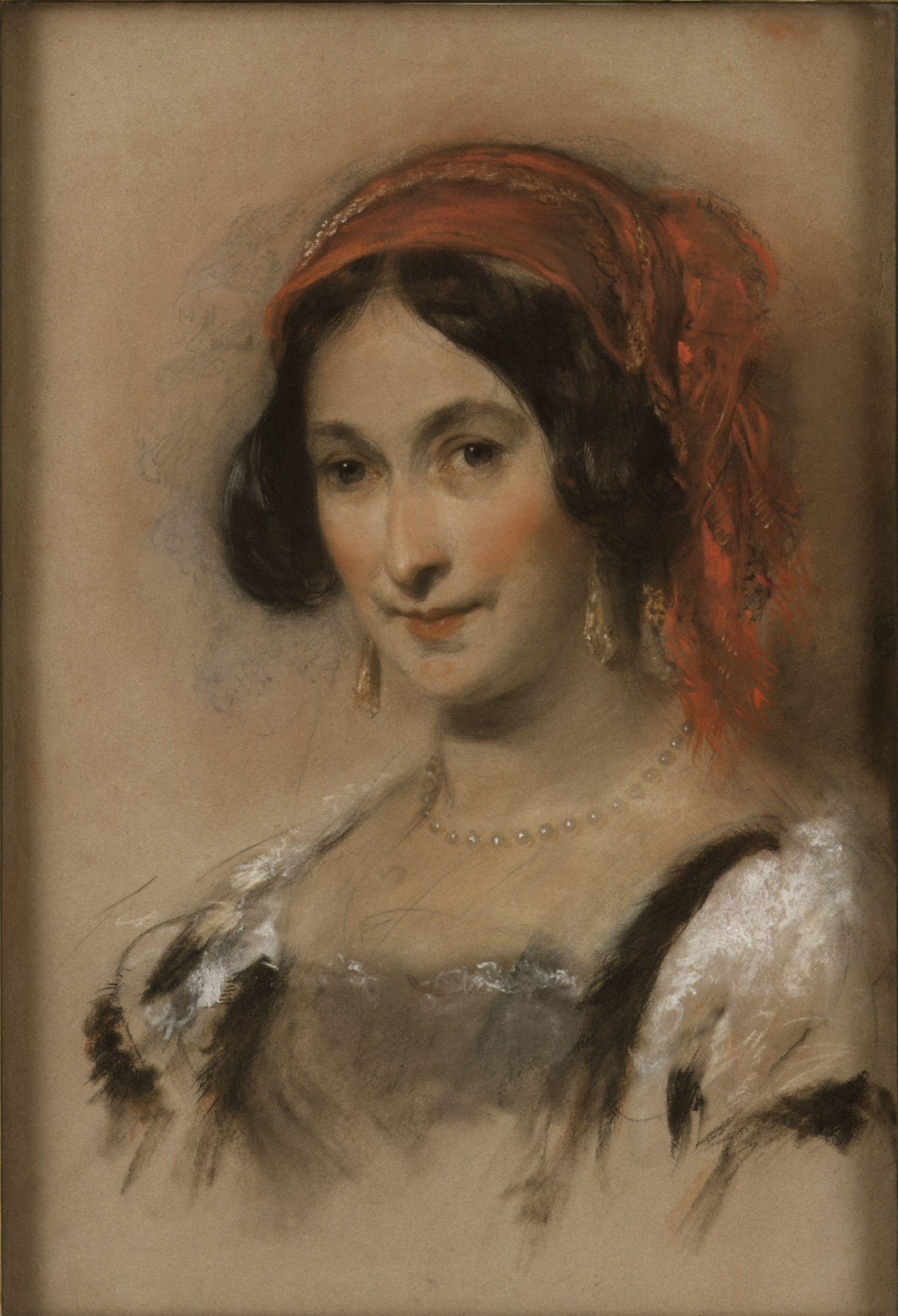
Catherine, Lady Stepney

== Bibliography ==
- Drawings by Sir George and John Hayter (exh. cat. by B. Coffey [Bryant], London, Morton Morris, 1982) [incl. checklist of prints]

== See also ==
- List of British painters
