= Cascades Female Factory =

Former workhouse for convicts in Tasmania, Australia

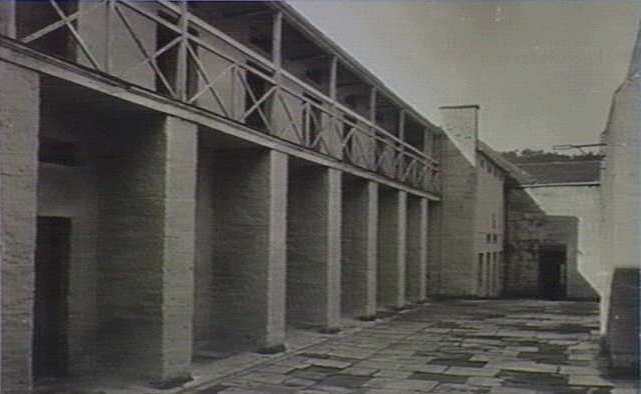
- Cascades Female Factory, circa 1914–41
- Interactive map of Cascades Female Factory
- Location: South Hobart, Tasmania; 42.8938°S 147.2993°E
- Status: UNESCO World Heritage Site
- Security class: Former female factory, penal colony
- Opened: 1828
- Closed: 1856
- Managed by: Port Arthur Historic Site Management Authority
- Website: www.femalefactory.org.au

UNESCO World Heritage Site
- Type: Cultural
- Criteria: iv, vi
- Designated: 2010 (34th session)
- Part of: Australian Convict Sites
- Reference no.: 1306
- Region: Asia-Pacific

Tasmanian Heritage Register
- Place ID: 10,851

The Cascades Female Factory (also known as Cascades, or CFF) is a former female factory and workhouse for female convicts in the former British penal colony of Van Diemen's Land. It is located in present-day South Hobart, Tasmania.

Between 1828 and 1853, more than half of the female convicts transported to Australia were sent to Van Diemen’s Land, and most spent some time at the Cascades Female Factory. As Hobart Town was the colony’s capital and principal port, the factory functioned as the central institution for the reception, assignment, punishment and confinement of convict women. The factory operated from 1828 until 1856 as a female factory, and continued in use as a gaol until 1877.

The site is one of 11 heritage sites that together comprise the Australian Convict Sites, inscribed on the UNESCO World Heritage List in 2010. The Australian Convict Sites collectively illustrate the forced migration of convicts and the global development of penal systems based on punishment and reform. Cascades is recognised in particular for representing the female convict experience and the role of penal transportation in British colonial expansion.

Now operated as a museum and tourist attraction, the Cascades Female Factory Historic Site is managed by the Port Arthur Historic Site Management Authority. It preserves three of the original five yards and is open daily except Christmas Day, offering guided tours and exhibitions.

== History ==
=== Penal usage ===
Some rooms in the Macquarie Street Gaol served as a temporary Hobart "Female Factory" in the mid-1820s. The Cascades Female Factory was purpose-built in 1828 and operated as a convict facility until 1856. It was intended to remove women convicts from the negative influences and temptations of Hobart, and also to protect society from what was seen as their immorality and corrupting influence. The Factory was located, however, in an area of damp swamp land, and with overcrowding, poor sanitation and inadequate food and clothes, there was a high rate of disease and mortality among its inmates.

=== History and Interpretation Centre development ===
The Cascades Female Factory is the only remaining female factory with extant remains which give a sense of what female factories were like. It is included on the Australian National Heritage List. It was inscribed on the World Heritage list in July 2010, along with ten other Australian convict sites.

Between 2018 and 2019, almost 35,000 people visited the site. A design competition for a new History and Interpretation Centre was won by an international team composed of Tasmanian practice Liminal Studio, international firm Snøhetta and Melbourne landscape architecture practice Rush Wright Associates in 2018. In 2020, the State Government committed $3 million towards the new $5 million Visitor and Interpretation Centre to enhance the storytelling experience and increase visitation. The Federal Government contributed the remaining $2 million.

The Cascades Female Factory Historic Site was re-opened in March 2022 with the launch of the new History and Interpretation Centre, with Honourable Madeleine Ogilvie MP and Honourable Dame Quentin Bryce delivering keynote speeches.

== Gallery ==
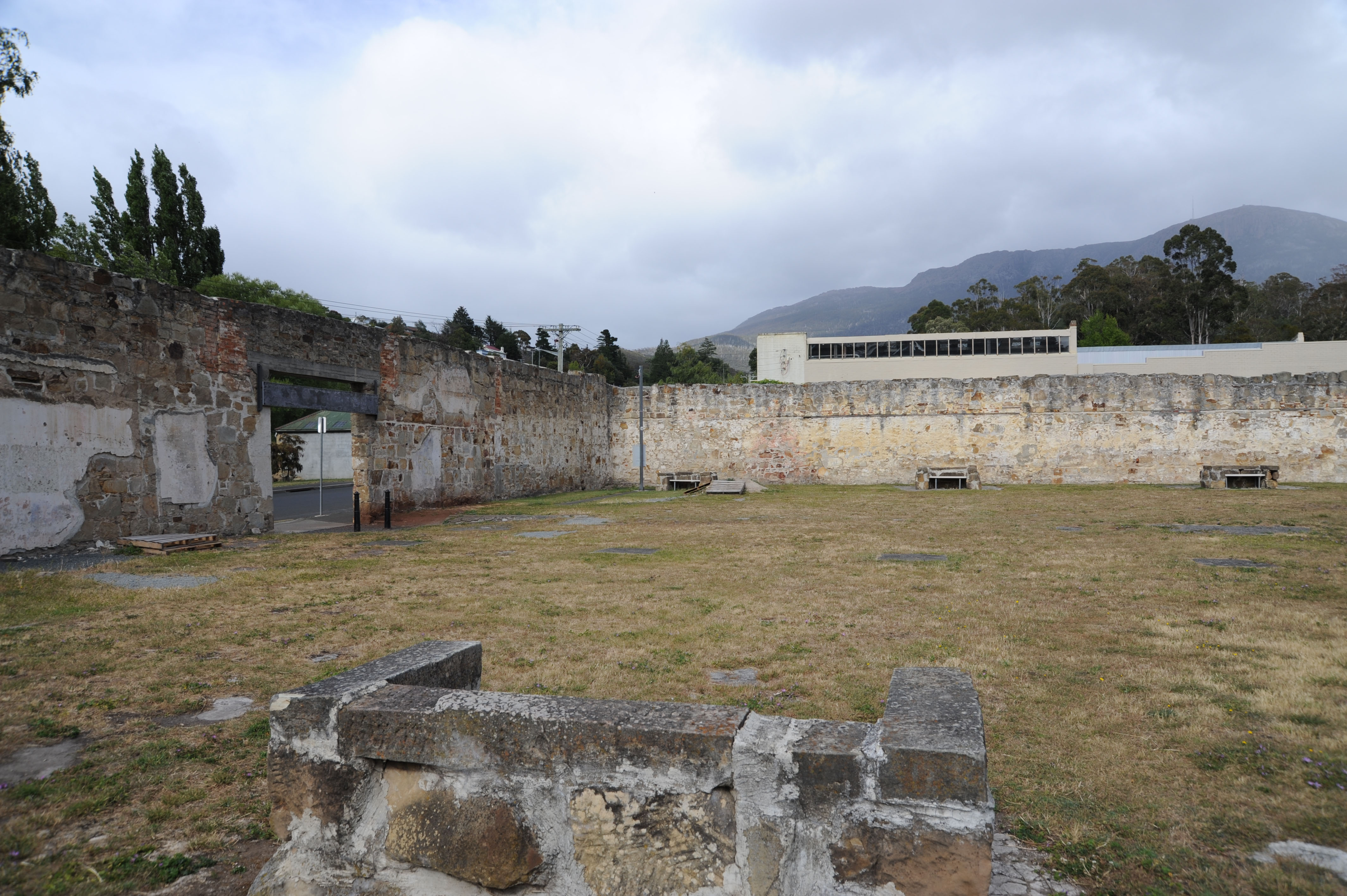
Inside the sandstone wall remains of one of the yards (2009)

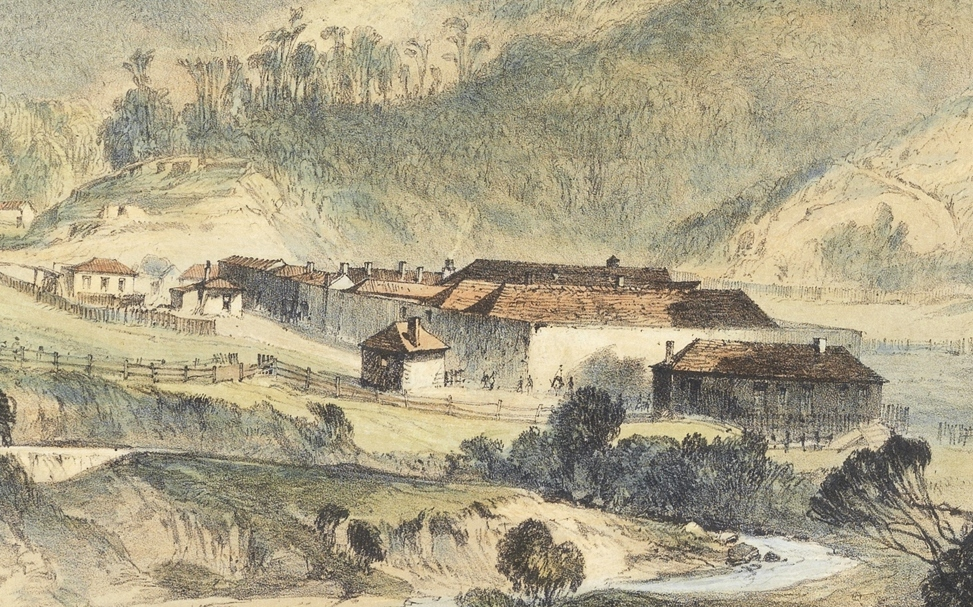
A painting of Cascades Female Factory in 1844 by John Skinner Prout

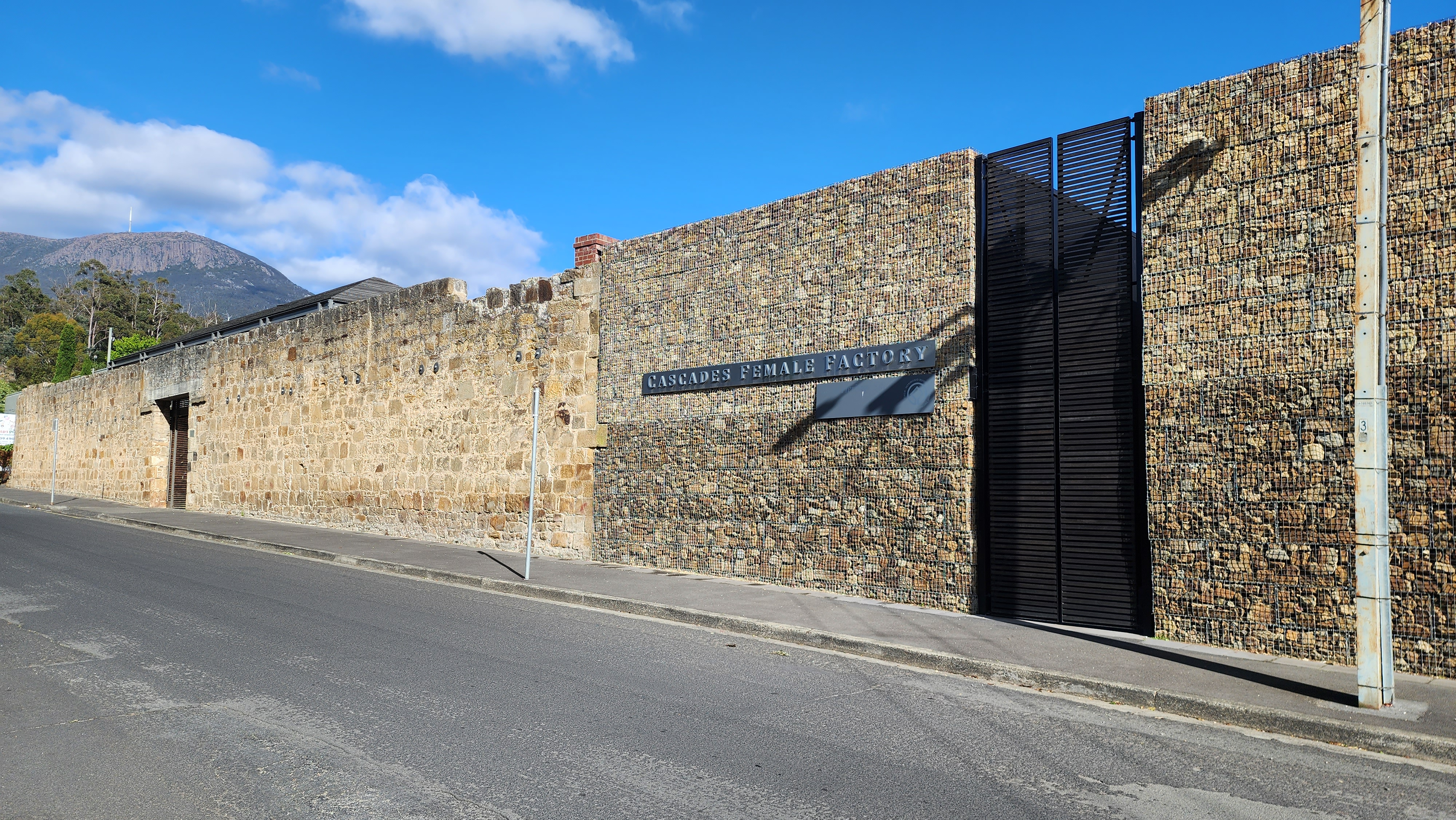
Cascades Female Factory-Degraves Street view

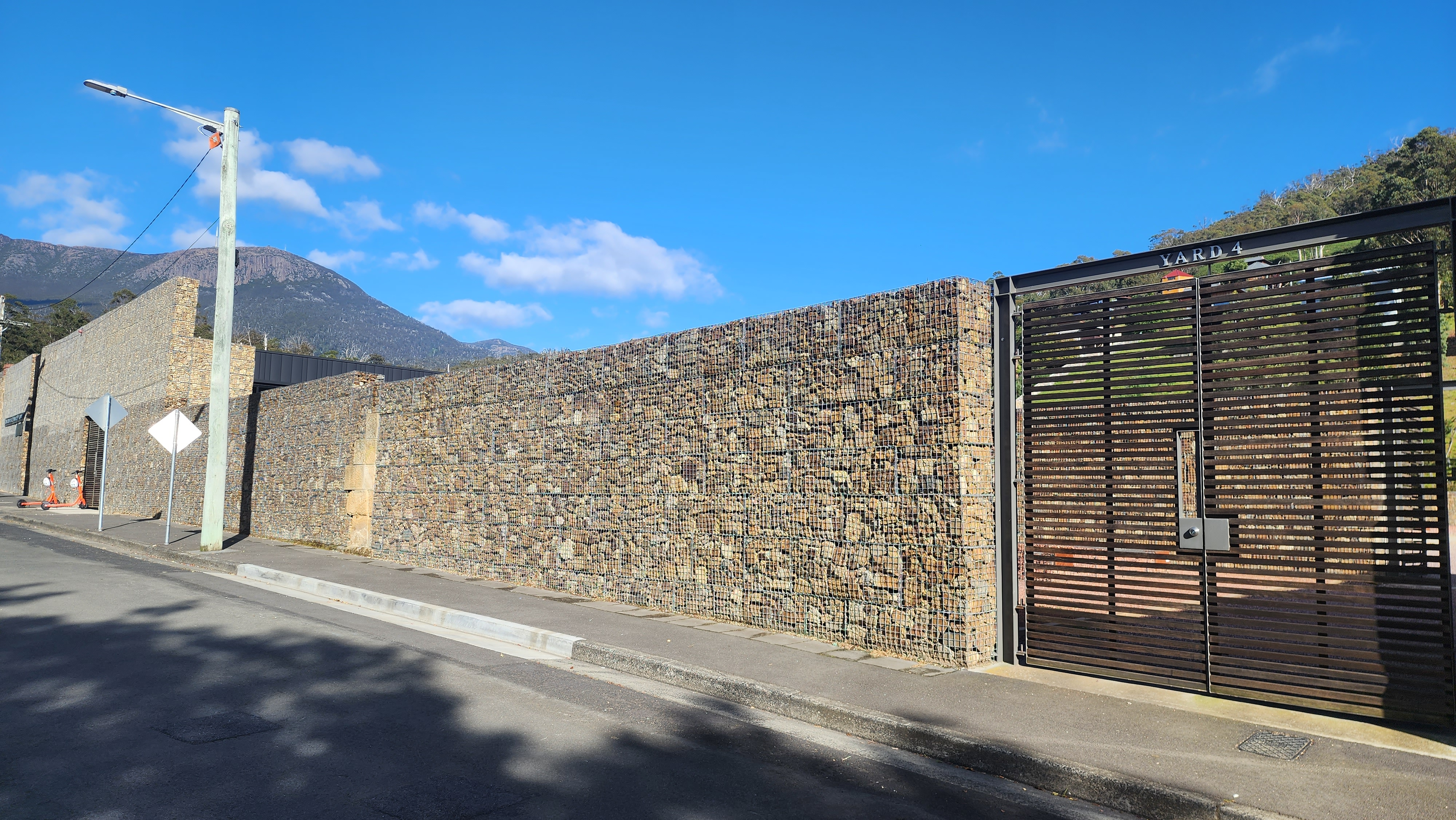
Cascades Female Factory-Yard 4 entry

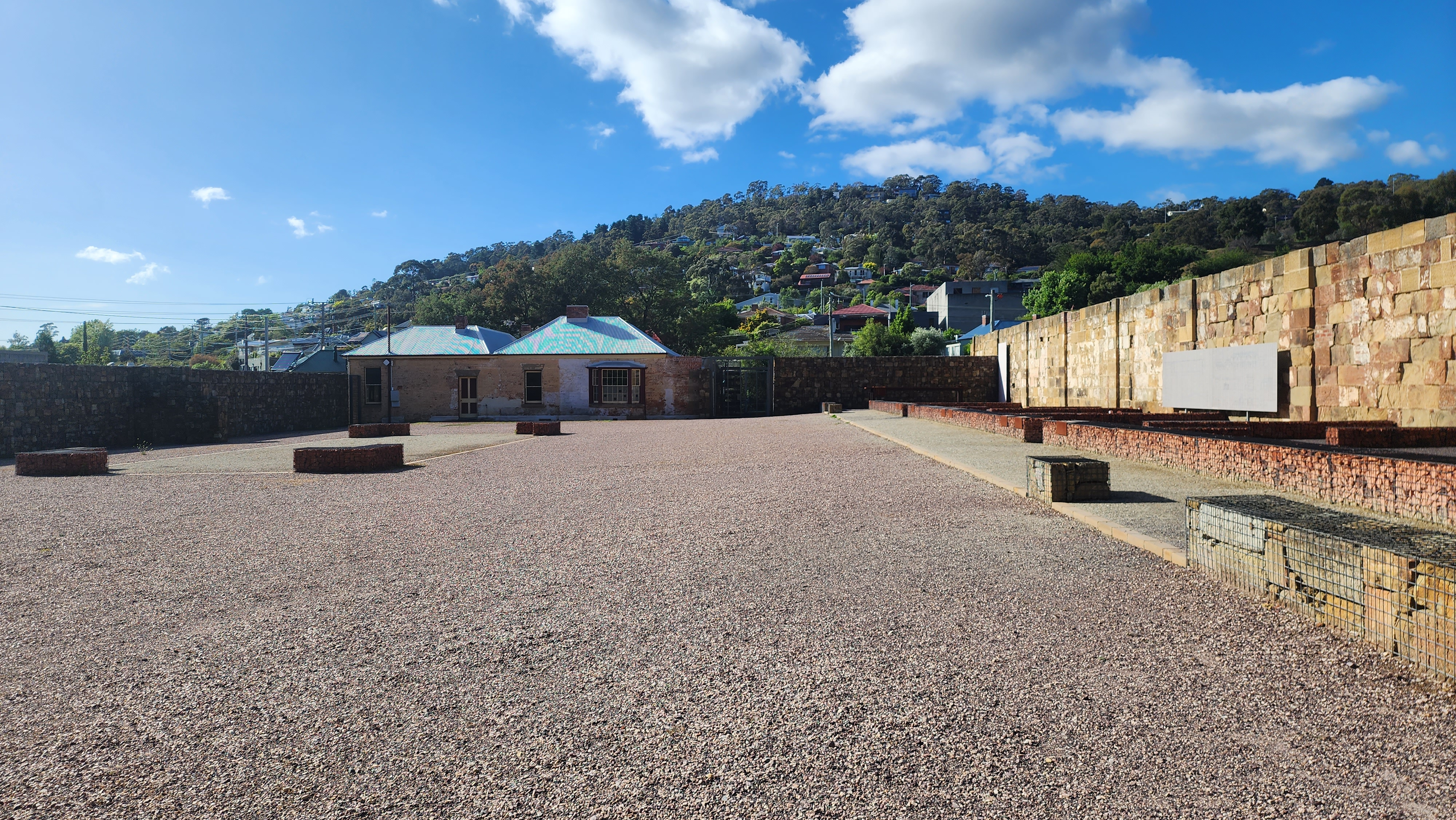
Cascades Female Factory-Yard 4

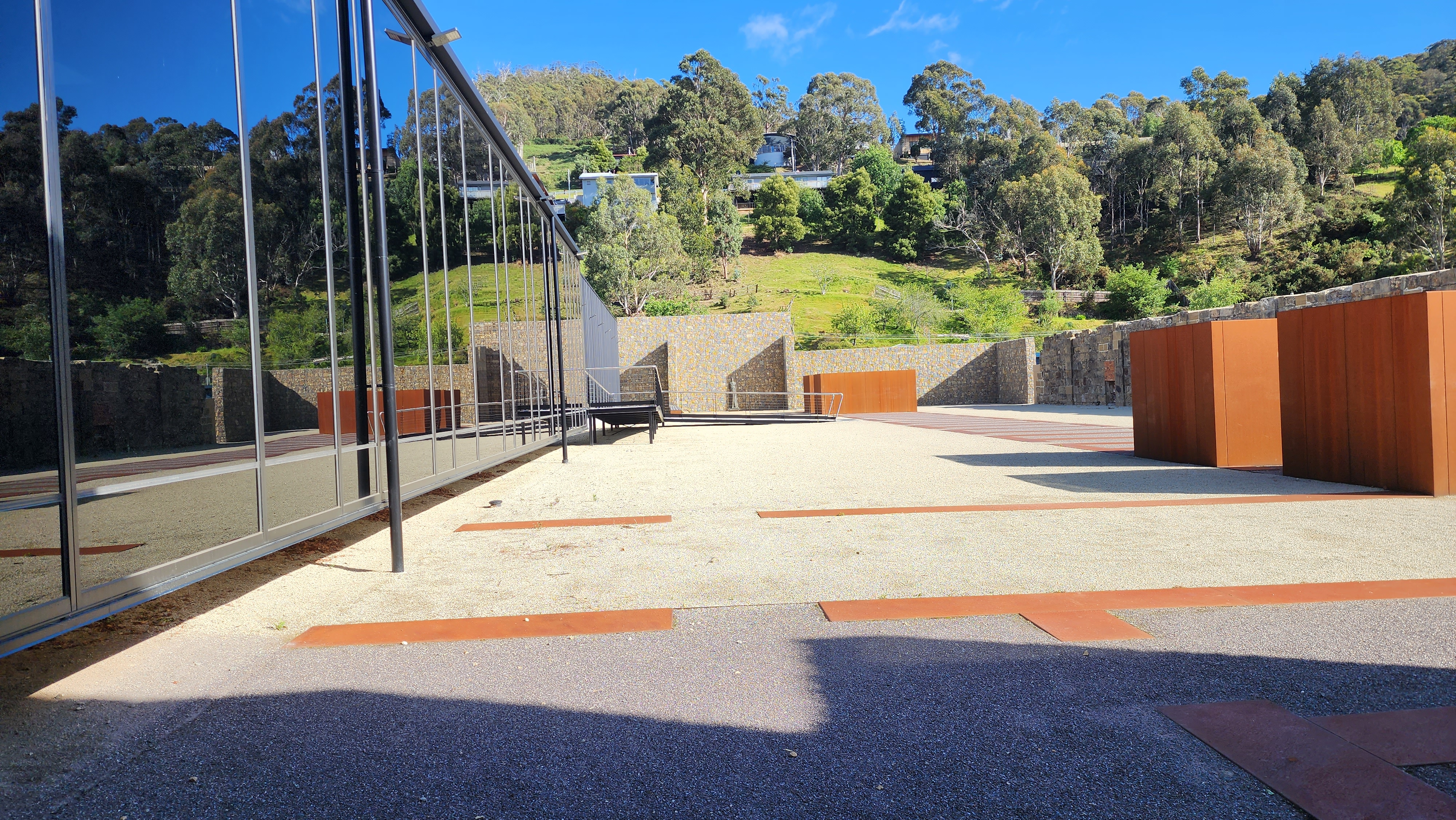
Cascades Female Factory-Middle yard

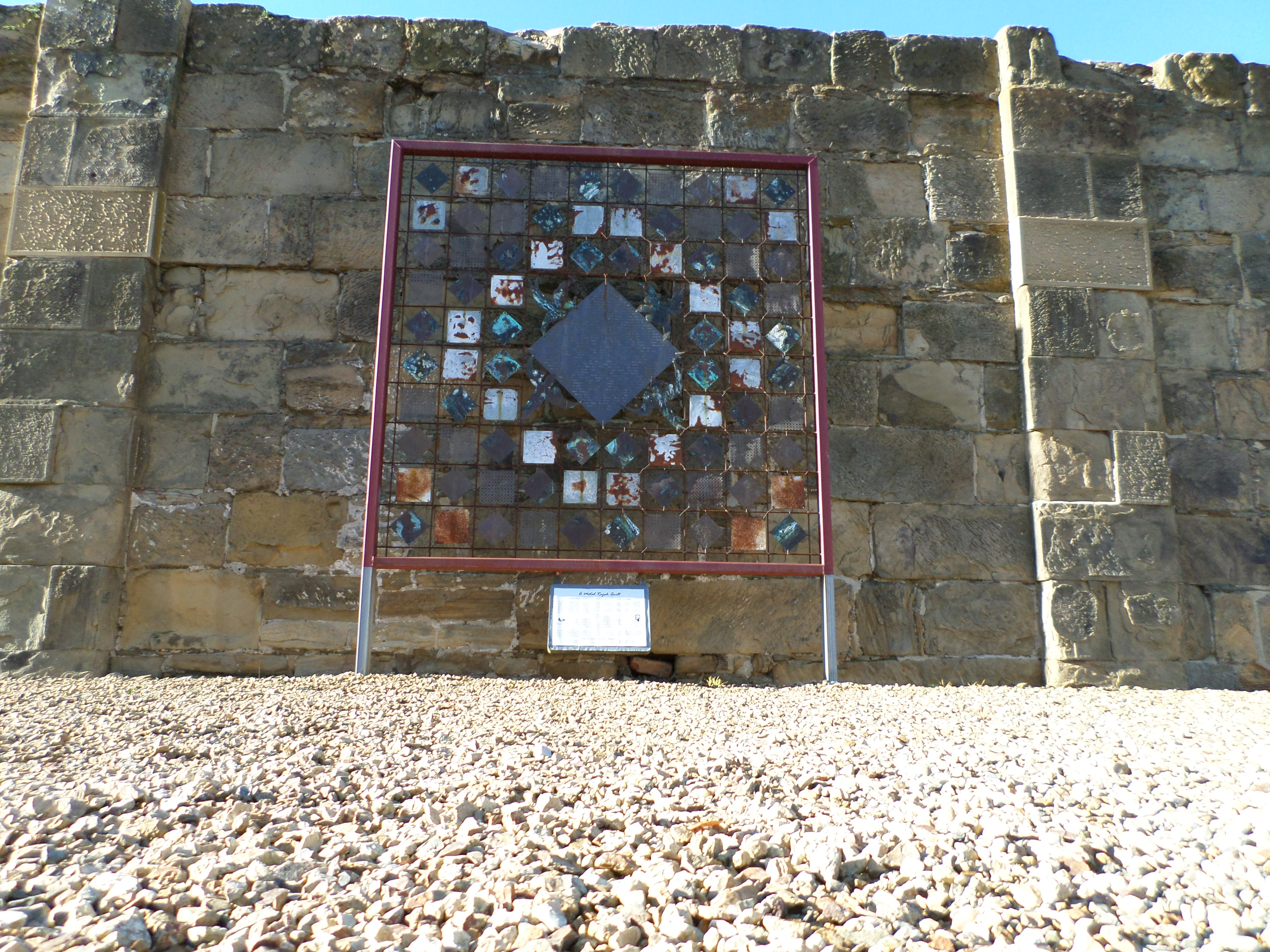
An interpretation of the Quilt made by women on the Convict ship Rajah

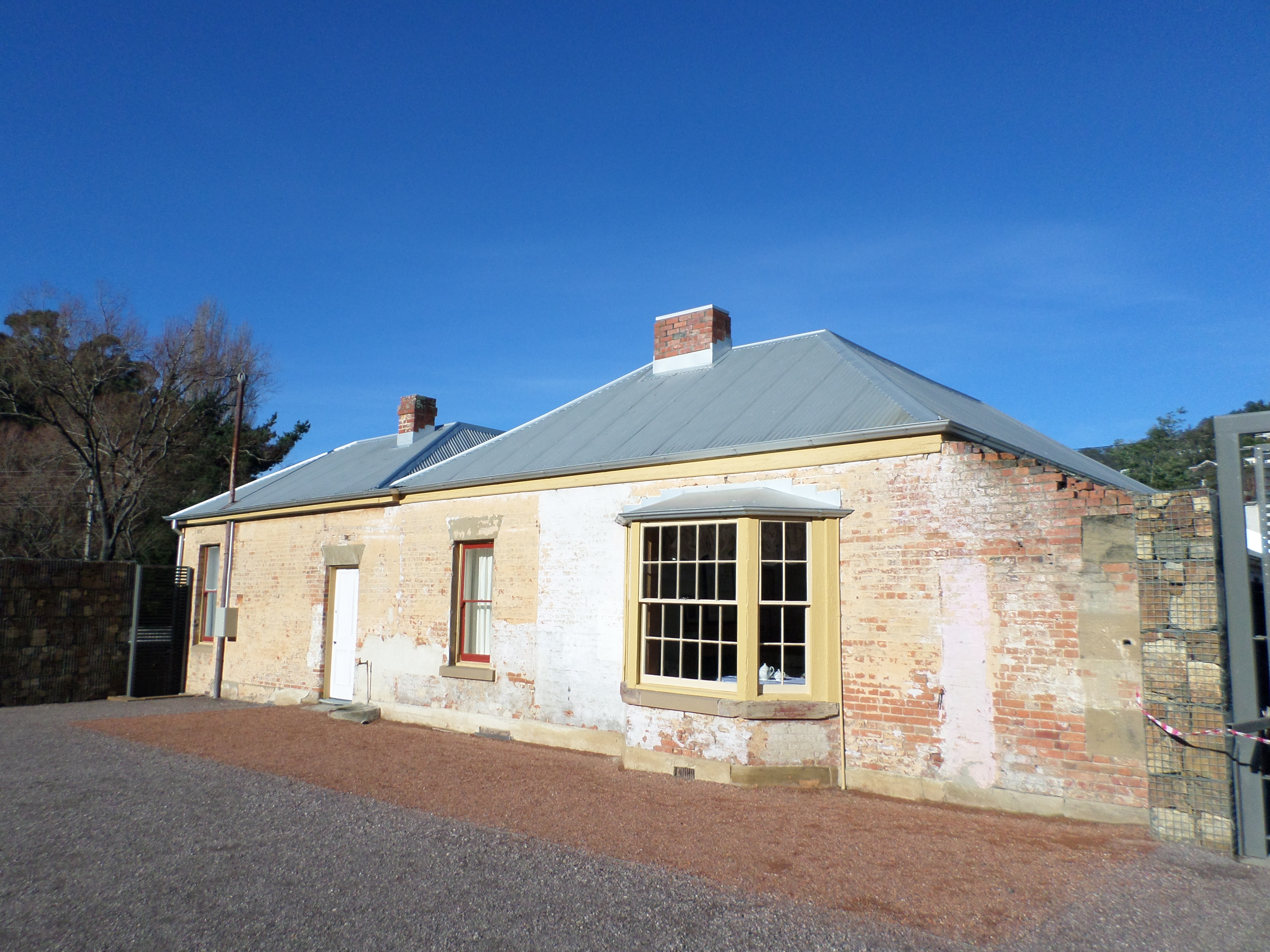
Cottage in Yard 4

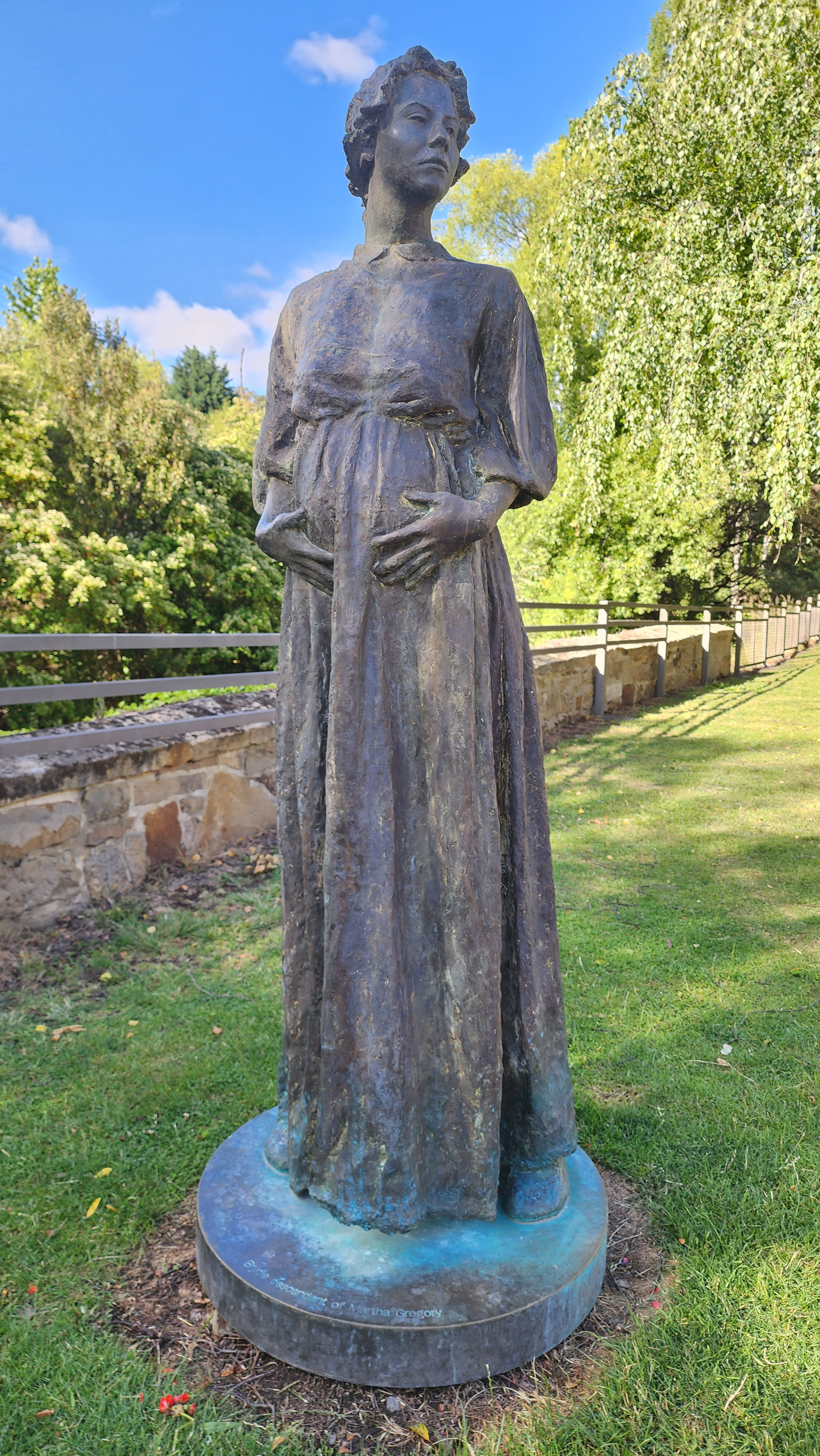
From the Shadows statue out front of Cascades Female Factory

== See also ==
- Female Factory
