= List of ships named Eliza Stewart =

At least three vessels have been named Eliza Stewart.

- Eliza Stewart (1833 ship) was a sailing ship that traded with Australia, China, and India and was last listed in 1843, having wrecked in January 1844.
- Eliza Stewart (1845 brig), of 97 tons (bm), was launched at Saint Thomas. She was carrying coals from Newcastle to Cadiz when she foundered on 21 July 1861 off the Humber.
- Eliza Stewart (1845 ship) was a merchant ship that also between 1851 and 1853 carried coolies between India and Trinidad; she was wrecked circa 1865.

Citations
