= Elizabeth Stuart =

Elizabeth Stuart may refer to:

== Members of the royal House of Stuart ==
- Elizabeth Stuart, Countess of Lennox (1555–1582), mother of Arabella Stuart
- Elizabeth Stuart, 2nd Countess of Moray (1565–1591), daughter of James Stewart, 1st Earl of Moray and Agnes Keith
- Elizabeth Stuart, Queen of Bohemia (1596–1662), daughter of James VI/I of Scotland and England
- Elizabeth Stuart (1610–1674), daughter of Esmé Stewart, 3rd Duke of Lennox
- Elizabeth Stuart (daughter of Charles I) (1635–1650), daughter of Charles I of England and Scotland
- Elizabeth Stuart (daughter of James II) (1678–1678/1679), daughter of James II/VII of England and Scotland and Mary of Modena

== Other people ==
- Elizabeth Stuart (theologian) (born 1963), British theologian
- Elizabeth A. Stuart, professor of mental health and biostatistics
- Liz Stuart (born 1960), voice actress from Happy Tree Friends

== See also ==
- Elizabeth Stuart Phelps Ward (1844–1911), feminist American author and intellectual
- Eliza Stewart (disambiguation)
- Elizabeth Stewart (disambiguation)
