= Eliza Stewart =

Eliza Stewart may refer to:

- Eliza Daniel Stewart (1816–1908), early temperance movement leader in the U.S.
- Eliza Stewart Udall (1855–1937), née Eliza Stewart, first telegraph operator in Arizona
- Eliza Stewart Boyd (1833–1912), née Eliza Stewart, first woman to serve on a jury
- Eliza Stewart (1833 ship)
- Eliza Stewart (1845 ship)

== See also ==
- Elizabeth Stewart (disambiguation)
