= Anton Erkoreka =

Basque historian of medicine and ethnographer

Anton Erkoreka (1950, Biscaya, Basque Country) is a Basque historian of medicine and an ethnographer. He is director of the Basque Museum of the History of Medicine and Science, located at the University of the Basque Country. His areas of specialization include the history of diseases, in particular the Spanish flu pandemic, folk medicine, such as the evil eye and the study of human populations.

== Works ==
- Erkoreka, Anton (2010). "The Spanish influenza pandemic in occidental Europe (1918-1920) and victim age". Influenza and Other Respiratory Viruses. 4 (2): 81–9. doi:10.1111/j.1750-2659.2009.00125.x. PMC 5779284. PMID 20167048.
- "Épidémies en Pays basque. De la peste noire à la grippe espagnole" (PDF). Histoire des sciences médicales. 42 (2): 113–22. 2008. Archived from the original (PDF) on 20 July 2011.
- La historia de la medicina en el País Vasco (PDF). Bilbao: Baster. 2007. ISBN 978-84-930782-9-4. Archived from the original (PDF) on 20 July 2011.
- La pandemia de gripe española en el País Vasco (1918-1919) (PDF). Bilbao: Baster. 2006. ISBN 978-84-930782-5-6. Archived from the original (PDF) on 21 June 2012.
- Análisis de la medicina popular vasca. Barcelona: Bibliotex. 2002. ISBN 84-8130-548-0.
- Los vikingos en Euskal Herria. Bilbao: Ekain. 1995. ISBN 84-605-2149-4.
- Euskal antropologoak, etnologoak eta etnografoak gaur. Donostia: Kriselu. 1988. ISBN 84-7728-105-X.
