= List of shipwrecks in January 1844 =

The list of shipwrecks in January 1844 includes ships sunk, foundered, wrecked, grounded, or otherwise lost during January 1844.

== 1 January ==
List of shipwrecks: 1 January 1844
Ship	State	Description
Amity	United Kingdom	The ship was wrecked on the Northern Triangles. Her crew were rescued. She was on a voyage from British Honduras to Liverpool, Lancashire.
British Oak	United Kingdom	The ship ran aground on Rock Angus. She was on a voyage from Caen, Calvados, France to Rush, County Dublin. She was refloated and resumed her voyage.
Hope	United Kingdom	The ship was driven ashore and wrecked on Rattray Head, Aberdeenshire. Her crew were rescued. She was on a voyage from Perth to Drogheda, County Louth.
Marys	United Kingdom	The brigantine was wrecked near Achininver, Caithness. Her crew were rescued. She was on a voyage from South Shields, County Durham to Liverpool, Lancashire.

== 2 January ==
List of shipwrecks: 2 January 1844
Ship	State	Description
Angelina	United Kingdom	The ship was driven ashore in the Sound of Luing. She was on a voyage from Liverpool, Lancashire to South Shields, County Durham. Angelina was refloated and taken into Easdale in a leaky condition.
Cynthia Ann	United Kingdom	The ship ran aground on the Carron Rock. She was on a voyage from the Clyde to Boston, Massachusetts, United States. She was refloated the next day.
Gratitude	United Kingdom	The ship ran aground off Quillebeuf-sur-Seine, Eure, France. She was on a voyage from Newport, Monmouthshire to Rouen, Seine-Inférieure, France. She was refloated.
Jane and Ellen	United Kingdom	The ship was driven ashore west of Wells-next-the-sea, Norfolk. She was refloated on 5 January.
Ocean	United Kingdom	The ship was driven ashore and wrecked at Kingsgate, Kent. She was on a voyage from Sierra Leone to London.
Sir James Gordon	United Kingdom	The ship foundered in the North Sea off Happisburgh Norfolk. Her crew survived. She was on a voyage from Rouen, Seine-Inférieure, France to South Shields, County Durham.
St. John	United Kingdom	The ship ran aground in Liverpool Bay off Bootle, Lancashire. She was on a voyage from Liverpool, Lancashire to Newfoundland, British North America.

== 3 January ==
List of shipwrecks: 3 January 1844
Ship	State	Description
Agnes	(United Kingdom of Great Britain and Ireland) Jersey	The schooner ran aground on the Cork Sand, in the North Sea off the coast of Suffolk. She was on a voyage from Hartlepool, County Durham to Manningtree, Essex. She was refloated the next day and put into Mistley, Essex.
Amitie	France	The ship was wrecked in a hurricane at Mauritius. She was later refloated.
Bordeaux	France	The ship was driven onto a reef off Mauritius. All on board were rescued. She had been refloated by 2 February and taken into Mauritius for repairs.
Cosacco	Ottoman Empire	The ship was driven ashore at Sigri, Greece. She was on a voyage from Galați to Constantinople and Marseille, Bouches-du-Rhône, France. She was refloated on 4 January and towed into Sigri.
Hebe	United Kingdom	The ship was wrecked on the Fish Keys, off Crooked Island, Bahamas. Her crew were rescued. She was on a voyage from Haiti to Cork.
Hercules	United States	The ship struck the Brake Sand, in the North Sea and foundered. Her crew were rescued. She was on a voyage from Newcastle upon Tyne, Northumberland, United Kingdom to New York.
Hugh Mathie	United Kingdom	The East Indiaman, on her maiden voyage, was driven ashore in a hurricane at Mauritius with the loss of a crew member. She was later refloated but ran aground on a reef and was wrecked.
Malay	India	The brig was driven ashore and wrecked on Mauritius. All on board were rescued.
Marion	United Kingdom	The ship was wrecked on a reef off Mauritius. All on board were rescued.
Susanna Cummin	United Kingdom	The ship ran aground off Rhyl, Denbighshire. She was refloated.

== 4 January ==
List of shipwrecks: 4 January 1844
Ship	State	Description
Shepherdess	United States	The ship was wrecked in the Mississippi River near Cahokia, Illinois with the loss of 70 to 100 lives.
Theodore	France	The ship was wrecked off Île Pélee, Seine-Inférieure with the loss of three of her crew.
Walger	United States	The schooner was abandoned in the Atlantic Ocean 300 nautical miles (560 km) off the American coast. Her crew were rescued by the barque Pons (United States). Walger was on a voyage from Wilmington, Delaware to New York.

== 5 January ==
List of shipwrecks: 5 January 1844
Ship	State	Description
Cowndon	United Kingdom	The ship ran aground on Scroby Sands, Norfolk. She was on a voyage from Stockton-on-Tees, County Durham to London. She was refloated and beached at Winterton-on-Sea, Norfolk and was subsequently taken into Great Yarmouth.
Gratitude	United Kingdom	The ship ran aground on the Traverse, in the English Channel. She was on a voyage from Newport, Monmouthshire to Rouen, Seine-Inférieure, France. She was later refloated.
Jane	United Kingdom	The schooner was wrecked on the Saltstone Rocks, off Boyndie, Aberdeenshire. Her crew survived. She was on a voyage from Burghead, Morayshire to Aberdeen.
John	United Kingdom	The ship ran aground off Hare Island, County Galway. She was on a voyage from Galway to London. She was refloated and resumed her voyage.
Margaret	United Kingdom	The ship was wrecked near Cap Camarat, Var, France. Her crew were rescued.
Margarets	United Kingdom	The brig was wrecked near Cape Farina, Beylik of Tunis. She was on a voyage from Tunis to Hull, Yorkshire.
Napoleon	France	The ship was driven ashore and damaged on the coast of Venezuela. She was on a voyage from Havre de Grâce, Seine-Inférieure to Maracaibo, Venezuela. She was refloated and taken into Maracaibo.
Tartar	United Kingdom	The ship was driven ashore in a hurricane at Mauritius. She was later refloated.
Tra Brodre	Sweden	The ship ran aground off Grasgard with the loss of all but one of her crew. She was on a voyage from Stockholm to an English port.

== 6 January ==
List of shipwrecks: 6 January 1844
Ship	State	Description
Antonio	Bremen	The ship was wrecked east of Tromøya, Norway.
Averhof	Prussia	The ship was wrecked off Merdø, Norway with the loss of all hands.
Eagle	United Kingdom	The brig was abandoned in the River Tay. She subsequently drove ashore and was damaged.
Edward	Stettin	The ship was wrecked near the entrance to the Agger Canal. Her crew were rescued. She was on a voyage from Porthcawl, Glamorgan, United Kingdom to Stettin.
Kingston	United Kingdom	The ship struck a sunken rock and was damaged. She was on a voyage from Riga, Russia to London. She put into Christiansand, Norway.
Minerva	United Kingdom	The ship ran aground on the Blackwater Bank, in the Irish Sea. She floated off and was driven ashore at Cahore Point, County Wexford, where she subsequently became a wreck. Her crew were rescued. She was on a voyage from the Clyde to Bombay, India.
Prince Albert	United Kingdom	The ship struck a rock and was damaged off Bandon, County Cork.
Providence	United States	The ship was driven ashore at Mobile, Alabama.
Stephens	United Kingdom	The ship was abandoned in the River Tay.

== 7 January ==
List of shipwrecks: 7 January 1844
Ship	State	Description
Cambridge	United Kingdom	The barque was destroyed by fire at Plymouth, Devon. She was on a voyage from Newcastle upon Tyne, Northumberland to Valparaíso, Chile.
Fanny	United Kingdom	The sloop was driven onto the Horse Bank, in Liverpool Bay. Her crew were rescued.
Helen	United States	The ship ran aground off Ice Island, in the Gaspar Strait. She was refloated on 10 March.
Nymph	United Kingdom	The ship was damaged by fire at Liverpool, Lancashire.
Rika	Prussia	The ship was wrecked off Justøy, Norway. Her crew were rescued. She was on a voyage from Wolgast to London, United Kingdom.

== 8 January ==
List of shipwrecks: 8 January 1844
Ship	State	Description
Ann	United Kingdom	The collier ran aground on the Herd Sand, off the coast of County Durham. Her crew were rescued by the North Shields Lifeboat. She was refloated the next day and towed into South Shields.
Assiduous	United Kingdom	The collier ran aground on the Herd Sand. Her crew were rescued by the North Shields Lifeboat. She was refloated the next day and towed into South Shields.
Castor	United Kingdom	The sloop collided with the schooner Speedy ( (United Kingdom of Great Britain and Ireland) Jersey) and foundered off Sunderland, County Durham with the loss of one of her two crew.
David and Robert	United Kingdom	The ship struck a sunken rock and was beached at Tarbert, Ayrshire.
Erin	United Kingdom	The brig was driven ashore at Sunderland.
Familien	Netherlands	The ship ran aground at "Graedyh", Denmark. She subsequently put into Fredrikshavn. She was on a voyage from Nieuwstadt, Limburg to Liverpool, Lancashire, United Kingdom.
Guardiana	United Kingdom	The brig was driven ashore at Sunderland.
Harmony	United Kingdom	The collier ran aground on the Herd Sand. Her crew were rescued by the North Shields Lifeboat. She was refloated on 17 January.
Johanna Maria Christina	Netherlands	The ship capsized at Amsterdam, North Holland. She was later righted.
Lisette	Flag unknown	The ship was driven ashore at Buccari, Austrian Empire.
Woodbine	(United Kingdom of Great Britain and Ireland) British North America	The ship was driven ashore and wrecked at Yarmouth, Nova Scotia. She was on a voyage from Saint John's, Newfoundland to Yarmouth.

== 9 January ==
List of shipwrecks: 9 January 1844
Ship	State	Description
Baronet	United Kingdom	The brig was driven ashore and wrecked at "Galita" or the "Island of Galati". Her crew were rescued. She was on a voyage from Smyrna, Ottoman Empire to Liverpool, Lancashire.
Dorothy Gales	United Kingdom	The ship was driven ashore at Portneyon Point, Glamorgan.
Elizabeth and Mary	United Kingdom	The ship was driven ashore in Branshay Bay, Orkney Islands. she was on a voyage from Riga, Russia to Belfast, County Antrim. She was refloated on 11 January and taken into Stornoway, Isle of Lewis, Outer Hebrides.
Lawson	United Kingdom	The ship sank off Scroby Sands, Norfolk. Her crew were rescued.
Mark Breeds	United Kingdom	The ship ran aground on the Middle Sand, in the North Sea off the coast of Essex. She was on a voyage from Tralee, County Kerry to London. She was refloated and taken into Whitstable, Kent.
New Flora	United Kingdom	The fishing smack collided with Rebecca (United Kingdom) and foundered off the Kentish Knock.
Old Year's Gift	United Kingdom	The ship was driven ashore and wrecked at Wainfleet, Lincolnshire. Her crew were rescued.
Thomas and Ann	United Kingdom	The ship was dismasted off Lough Swilly and was abandoned by her crew.
Two Brothers	United Kingdom	The ship was in collision with a Dutch galliot off Trevose Head, Cornwall and was abandoned by her crew. She was on a voyage from Truro, Cornwall to Port Talbot, Glamorgan. She was towed into Padstow, Cornwall the next day in a waterlogged condition.
Wave	United Kingdom	The ship was wrecked on the Falsterbo Reef, off the coast of Sweden. She was on a voyage from Pillau, Prussia to Hull, Yorkshire.

== 10 January ==
List of shipwrecks: 10 January 1844
Ship	State	Description
Alerte	Sweden	The ship ran aground on the Gunfleet Sand, in the North Sea off the coast of Essex, United Kingdom. She was on a voyage from Härnösand to Lisbon, Portugal. She was refloated and assisted into Wivenhoe, Essex.
Jane White	United Kingdom	The ship capsized at Newport, Monmouthshire. She was righted the next day.
John and Robert	United Kingdom	The ship ran aground on Foreland Point, County Down. She was on a voyage from Ardrossan, Ayrshire to Liverpool, Lancashire. She was refloated and resumed her voyage.
Mary	United Kingdom	The ship was holed by a sunken rock off Jersey, Channel Islands. She put into Jersey the next day.
Newburg	United Kingdom	The ship ran aground off Quillebeuf-sur-Seine, Eure, France whilst under tow and was run into by another vessel and damaged. She was refloated and towed into Havre de Grâce, Seine-Inférieure, France for repairs.
Pomona	United Kingdom	The ship ran aground on The Shingles. She was on a voyage from Amsterdam, North Holland, Netherland to New York, United States. She was refloated and towed into Ramsgate, Kent.
Talbot	Brazil	The ship was wrecked on a reef off Cape Santa Maria, Ottoman Empire. She was on a voyage from Pernambuco to Trieste.
Viscount Downe	United Kingdom	The ship ran aground on the Haisborough Sands, in the North Sea off the coast of Norfolk and sank. Her crew were rescued. She was on a voyage from Hamburg to London.

== 11 January ==
List of shipwrecks: 11 January 1844
Ship	State	Description
Amore Jaccarina	Flag unknown	The ship was wrecked at Navarino, Greece. Her crew were rescued. She was on a voyage from Galați, Ottoman Empire to Marseille, Bouches-du-Rhône, France.
Ana	Spain	The brig ran aground on the Goodwin Sands, Kent, United Kingdom. She was on a voyage from Hamburg to Havana, Cuba. She was refloated and put into Ramsgate, Kent.
Concordia	United Kingdom	The ship capsized at Ramsgate.
Friends	(United Kingdom of Great Britain and Ireland) British North America	The ship was driven ashore at Canso, Nova Scotia. She was on a voyage from Pictou, Nova Scotia to Newfoundland. She was refloated on 29 January and resumed her voyage.
Gulnare	Bremen	The ship was sighted in the Strait of Sunda whilst on a voyage from Samarang, Netherlands East Indies to Bremen. No further trace, presumed foundered with the loss of all hands.
Hercules	Spain	Figurehead of Hercules. The brig ran aground on the Goodwin Sands. She was on a voyage from Hamburg to Havana. She was refloated and put into Ramsgate.
Hope	United Kingdom	The ship ran aground on the Cross Sand in the North Sea off the coast of Norfolk. She was on a voyage from Gothenburg, Sweden to London. She was refloated and resumed her voyage.
Maria Klindburg	Hamburg	The ship was driven ashore on Staten Island, New York, United States by ice. She was on a voyage from New York to Hamburg.

== 12 January ==
List of shipwrecks: 12 January 1844
Ship	State	Description
Actif	(Russian Empire) Grand Duchy of Finland	The ship struck a floating wreck and foundered in the North Sea 30 nautical miles (56 km) off Flamborough Head, Yorkshire, United Kingdom. Her crew were rescued. She was on a voyage form Helsinki to Hull, Yorkshire, United Kingdom.
Active	(United Kingdom of Great Britain and Ireland) British North America	The ship was driven ashore on Long Island, New York, United States. Her crew were rescued. She was on a voyage from Saint John's, Newfoundland to Philadelphia, Pennsylvania, United States. She had been refloated by 17 February.
Ann Creighton	United Kingdom	The ship departed from Gibraltar for Marseille, Bouches-du-Rhône. No further trace, presumed foundered in the Mediterranean Sea with the loss of all hands.
Anna Cecilia	Hamburg	The ship ran aground on the Goodwin Sands, Kent, United Kingdom. She was on a voyage from Hamburg to Buenos Aires, Argentina. She was refloated and put into Margate, Kent.
Ariel	United Kingdom	The smack was wrecked on the Cork Sand, in the North Sea off the coast of Suffolk. Her crew were rescued.
Helen Mar	United Kingdom	The ship was sighted off Java Head, Netherlands East Indies whilst on a voyage from Singapore to London. No further trace, presumed foundered with the loss of all hands.

== 13 January ==
List of shipwrecks: 13 January 1844
Ship	State	Description
Barclay	United Kingdom	The ship ran aground on Ballyferris Point, County Down. She was on a voyage from Maryport, Cumberland to Dublin. She was refloated and put into Donaghadee, County Down.
Borussia	Stettin	The ship ran aground on the Falsterbo Reef, in the Baltic Sea. She was on a voyage from Stettin to New Bedford, Massachusetts, United States and the South Seas. She was refloated and put into Copenhagen, Denmark in a leaky condition.
Catherine	United States	The ship was wrecked in the Beaver River with the loss of a crew member. She was on a voyage from Alexandria, Virginia to Saint John, New Brunswick, British North America.
Charlotte Ann	(United Kingdom of Great Britain and Ireland) British North America	The ship was wrecked on the north coast of Grand Manan Island, New Brunswick. Her crew were rescued. She was on a voyage from Saint John's, Newfoundland to Philadelphia, Pennsylvania.
Hindostan	United Kingdom	The steamship ran aground on the James and Mary Sand, in the Hooghly River. She was on a voyage from Calcutta, India to Suez, Egypt. She was refloated on 16 January.
Johanna de Vries	Netherlands	The ship ran aground on the Long Sand, in the North Sea off the coast of Essex, United Kingdom. She was on a voyage from Amsterdam, North Holland to Trieste. She was refloated and put into Ramsgate, Kent, United Kingdom for repairs.
Sarah and Jane	United Kingdom	The ship was abandoned in the North Sea off Flamborough Head, Yorkshire. Her crew were rescued. She was on a voyage from Sunderland, County Durham to Great Yarmouth, Norfolk.
Thomas and James	United Kingdom	The ship sank at Whitby, Yorkshire She was refloated.

== 14 January ==
List of shipwrecks: 14 January 1844
Ship	State	Description
Active	United Kingdom	The brigantine was driven ashore and wrecked at Port Jolly, Nova Scotia, British North America. She was on a voyage from Bermuda to Sydney, Nova Scotia.
Bolivar	United Kingdom	The ship ran aground on the Brake Sand, in the North Sea. She was on a voyage from Newcastle upon Tyne, Northumberland to Bordeaux, Gironde, France. She was refloated and resumed her voyage.
Hercules	United Kingdom	The barque ran aground on the Herd Sand, in the North Sea off the coast of County Durham. Her crew were rescued. She was refloated on 15 April and taken into South Shields, County Durham.
Jules	France	The ship was in collision with another vessel and foundered with the loss of a crew member. She was on a voyage from Marseille, Bouches-du-Rhône to Nantes, Loire-Inférieure.
Mary Ann	United Kingdom	The ship struck the quayside and sank at Caernarvon. She was on a voyage from Chester, Cheshire to Caernarvon.
Osprey	United Kingdom	The ship was driven ashore at Honfleur, Calvados, France.
William and Ann	United Kingdom	The schooner was abandoned in the Irish Sea, presumed subsequently sank.

== 15 January ==
List of shipwrecks: 15 January 1844
Ship	State	Description
Mary	United Kingdom	The ship was wrecked near "Pellier", Loire-Inférieure, France. Her crew were rescued.
Prince Mighete Kourcho	Ottoman Empire	The ship was driven ashore at Cap Camarat, Var, France with the loss of four of her crew. She was on a voyage from Ibrailha to Marseille, Bouches-du-Rhône, France.
Reparateur	France	The ship was driven ashore and wrecked near Barcelona, Spain with the loss of a crew member. She was on a voyage from Seville, Spain to Port-Vendres, Pyrenées-Atlantiques.
Ste Philomene	France	The ship was driven ashore and wrecked at Cette, Hérault with the loss of two of her crew. She was on a voyage from Nice, Alpes-Maritimes to Cette.

== 16 January ==
List of shipwrecks: 16 January 1844
Ship	State	Description
Martha	United Kingdom	The ship was driven ashore at Galway. She was refloated and taken into Galway.
Packet	United Kingdom	The ship was driven ashore in the Sound of Hoy. She was on a voyage from Kirkwall, Orkney Islands to Limerick. She was refloated on 29 January.
Rowland Hill	United Kingdom	The ship was in collision with an American ship in the Atlantic Ocean 100 nautical miles (190 km) north of the Isles of Scilly. She was abandoned the next day. Rowland Hill was on a voyage from Saint Domingo to Liverpool, Lancashire. She was taken into Dover, Kent in a waterlogged condition, arriving on 29 January.
Vrow Johanna	Netherlands	The ship ran aground on the Schulhoek Bank, off the coast of Zeeland. She was on a voyage from a Dutch port to Batavia, Netherlands East Indies. She was refloated and was towed into Hellevoetsluis, Zeeland.

== 17 January ==
List of shipwrecks: 17 January 1844
Ship	State	Description
Archangel	Russia	The brig was driven ashore at Bolderāja.
Benedict	Russia	The schooner was driven ashore at Bolderāja.
Betty	United Kingdom	The brig was driven ashore at Bolderāja.
Caroline	United Kingdom	The barque was driven ashore at Bolderāja.
Heinrich	Prussia	The brig was driven ashore and damaged at Bolderāja.
James Wilson	United States	The ship was driven ashore at New York. She was on a voyage from New York to Marseille, Bouches-du-Rhône, France. She was refloated and towed into New York.
Pendocrata	Russia	The brig was wrecked in the Dardanelles.
Penelope	Greece	The schooner was wrecked in the Dardanelles.
Sankiri	Sweden	The ship was driven ashore at Mardyck Point, Nord, France. She was on a voyage from Gothenburg to Oran, Algeria.
Thomas Laurence	Denmark	The schooner was driven ashore at Bolderāja.
Wilhelm	Russia	The schooner was driven ashore and damaged at Bolderāja.

== 18 January ==
List of shipwrecks: 18 January 1844
Ship	State	Description
Borodino	Portugal	The ship ran aground at New York, United States and was beached. She was on a voyage from Lisbon to the Rio Grande.
Edward Goodrich	United Kingdom	The ship ran aground on the Pelican Reef, off Barbados. She was refloated.
Emulous	United Kingdom	The brig was driven ashore at Needham's Point, Barbados. She was on a voyage from Demerara, British Honduras to Belfast, County Antrim. She was refloated the next day.
Giazone	Kingdom of Sardinia	The ship was lost near Alicante, Spain. She was on a voyage from Bahia, Brazil to Genoa.
Henry Kelsey	United States	The barque was driven ashore at Oistnis Point, Barbados. She was refloated.
Jeune Louis	France	The ship was driven ashore 4 nautical miles (7.4 km) north of Dénia, Spain. Her crew were rescued. She was on a voyage from Marseille, Bouches-du-Rhône to Brest, Finistère.
John and Mary	United Kingdom	The ship ran aground at Bideford, Devon.
Mary Ann	United Kingdom	The ship was driven ashore at Maryport, Cumberland. She was refloated the next day and taken into Maryport.
William	United Kingdom	The schooner was driven ashore at Ayr. Her crew were rescued. She was on a voyage from Belfast, County Antrim to Irvine, Ayrshire. William was refloated on 5 February 1844 and taken into Ayr.
William and Betty	United Kingdom	The sloop was driven ashore at Troon, Ayrshire. She was refloated on 21 January.

== 19 January ==
List of shipwrecks: 19 January 1844
Ship	State	Description
Active	United Kingdom	The ship was severely damaged by fire at Southwold, Suffolk.
Carib	United States	The ship was driven ashore on St. David's Island, Bermuda. she was on a voyage from Boston, Massachusetts to the River Plate. She was refloated and towed into Hamilton, Bermuda.
Falke	Bremen	The ship was driven ashore at Bremen. She was on a voyage from the Rio Grande to Bremen. She was refloated on 31 January.
Mercurius	Norway	The ship was driven ashore near "Hoiewarde". She was on a voyage from Bergen to Newcastle upon Tyne, Northumberland, United Kingdom. She was refloated and taken into "Kobervig".
Scotia	United Kingdom	The ship was driven ashore at Bremen. She was refloated on 31 January.
Swea	Sweden	The ship was driven ashore in the Elreborgsfjiord. She was refloated.
Tricolor	Sweden	The ship was driven ashore at "Elreburg". She was refloated.

== 20 January ==
List of shipwrecks: 20 January 1844
Ship	State	Description
Créole	French Navy	The Créole-class corvette was driven ashore on Negropont, Greece. She was refloated on 27 January with assistance from HMS Vesuvius (Royal Navy) and towed into Piraeus, Greece where she sank. She was later refloated.
Hacoli	(United Kingdom of Great Britain and Ireland) British North America	The ship was driven ashore and wrecked near Canso, Nova Scotia. Her crew were rescued. She was on a voyage from Manheim, Province of Canada to Halifax, Nova Scotia.
Shepherdess	United Kingdom	The brig ran aground on the Goodwin Sands, Kent and capsized. Her ten crew were rescued by the Deal boats Earl Grey, Po and Sparrow (all United Kingdom). She was on a voyage from Newcastle upon Tyne, Northumberland to Plymouth, Devon.

== 21 January ==
List of shipwrecks: 21 January 1844
Ship	State	Description
Bartley	United Kingdom	The ship was driven ashore at Ballywalter, County Antrim. She was refloated and towed into Belfast, County Antrim in a leaky condition.
Don Juan	United Kingdom	The schooner was driven ashore and damaged at Vostizza, Greece. She was later refloated and repaired.
Mermaid	United Kingdom	The schooner was driven ashore at Vostizza. She was later refloated.

== 23 January ==
List of shipwrecks: 23 January 1844
Ship	State	Description
Bertha Laura	Denmark	The ship sprang a leak and was beached near Fanø. She was on a voyage from Newcastle upon Tyne, Northumberland, United Kingdom to Roskilde.

== 24 January ==
List of shipwrecks: 24 January 1844
Ship	State	Description
Albertina Amalia	Sweden	The ship was wrecked off "Palminecken" with the loss of all but one of her crew. She was on a voyage from Gotland to Helsingborg.
Commerce	United Kingdom	The ship ran aground on the Murragh Spit, off the coast of County Donegal. She was refloated and resumed her voyage to Liverpool, Lancashire.
Finnis	United Kingdom	The ship was abandoned in the Atlantic Ocean. Her crew were rescued. She was on a voyage from Buenos Aires, Argentina to London.
Marie Magdalene	France	The ship was driven ashore at Pointe de Grave, Gironde.
Oriental	United Kingdom	The ship was run down and sunk in the Mediterranean Sea 80 to 90 nautical miles (150 to 170 km) north west of Malta by the barque St. Lawrence (United Kingdom). Her crew were rescued by Racer ( (United Kingdom of Great Britain and Ireland) Jersey). Oriental was on a voyage from Liverpool, Lancashire to Alexandria, Egypt.
Superbe	France	The ship struck the La Basse Jaune Rock, in Douarneney Bay and was abandoned by her crew. She was on a voyage from Bayonne, Basses-Pyrénées to Rouen, Seine-Inférieure. Superbe was refloated and towed into the "Île des Sems".
Trafalgar	United Kingdom	The ship ran aground on the Hill Wharf Bank, 2 nautical miles (3.7 km) south east of the Fleetwood Lighthouse, Lancashire. She floated off the next day and sank. Her crew survived.
Urania	Prussia	The brig sank at Antalya, Ottoman Empire. Her crew were rescued.

== 25 January ==
List of shipwrecks: 25 January 1844
Ship	State	Description
Æolus	United Kingdom	The ship sprang a leak off the coast of Wigtownshire and was beached in Saltpan Bay.
Charles	United Kingdom	The ship was in collision with Harriot (United Kingdom) and sank off Hartlepool, County Durham. Her crew were rescued. She was on a voyage from Wisbech, Cambridgeshire to Port Dundas, Renfrewshire.
Napoleon-le-Grand	France	The ship ran aground and capsized at Havre de Grâce, Seine-Inférieure. She was on a voyage from Havre de Gràce to Île Bourbon.
Zeeuw	Netherlands	The Dutch government frigate was wrecked on the Banjest Sandbank, in the North Sea off the coast of Zeeland. She was on a voyage from Batavia, Netherlands East Indies to Middelburg, Zeeland.

== 26 January ==
List of shipwrecks: 26 January 1844
Ship	State	Description
Alfred	United Kingdom	The smack was driven ashore near Workington, Cumberland. She was on a voyage from Ramsey, Isle of Man to Workington. She was refloated on 29 January and was later taken into Workington.
Anna	United Kingdom	The ship ran aground on Scroby Sands, Norfolk. She was on a voyage from Dundee, Forfarshire to London. She was refloated and taken into Great Yarmouth, Norfolk.
Bess	United Kingdom	The ship was driven ashore at Ironshore, Jamaica. Her crew were rescued.
Fly	(United Kingdom of Great Britain and Ireland) Jamaica	The ship was wrecked in the Flint River.
Lord Willoughby	United Kingdom	The ship was wrecked on the East Hoyle Sandbank, in Liverpool Bay. Her crew were rescued by the Hoylake Lifeboat.
Mary Queen of Scots	United Kingdom	The ship ran aground off Pernambuco, Brazil. She was refloated several days later and taken into the Rio Grande.
Nymph	United Kingdom	The schooner ran aground on the Blackwater Bank, in the Irish Sea. She was on a voyage from Liverpool, Lancashire to Limerick. She was refloated on 29 January and taken into Kingstown, County Dublin.
Rebecca	United Kingdom	The ship was wrecked in the Great River, Jamaica.
Sheraton Grange	United Kingdom	The brig ran aground on the Shipwash Sand, in the North Sea off the coast of Essex. She was on a voyage from South Shields, County Durham to Malta. She was refloated and taken into Harwich, Essex.
Queen Victoria	United Kingdom	The ship ran aground on the Zuidwal. She was on a voyage from Smyrna, Ottoman Empire to Amsterdam, North Holland, Netherlands.

== 27 January ==
List of shipwrecks: 27 January 1844
Ship	State	Description
Beata	Denmark	The ship was beached in Stromstad Bay. She was on a voyage from Horsens to Christiana. Norway.
Bellona	Belgium	The ship was driven ashore in the Scheldt. She was on a voyage from Antwerp to Constantinople, Ottoman Empire.
Eunomæia	Denmark	The ship was driven ashore near Gravelines, Nord. She was on a voyage from Stege to Dublin, United Kingdom. She was refloated on 8 February.
Helena	United Kingdom	The ship ran aground on the Barnard Sand, in the North Sea off the coast of Suffolk. She was refloated and taken into Lowestoft, Suffolk.

== 28 January ==
List of shipwrecks: 28 January 1844
Ship	State	Description
Aurora	Netherlands	The ship was driven ashore at Workington, Cumberland, United Kingdom. She was on a voyage from Rotterdam, South Holland to Maryport, Cumberland. She was refloated on 4 February and taken into Maryport.
Ferris	United Kingdom	The ship sprang a leak and foundered off Pernambuco, Brazil. Her crew were rescued. She was on a voyage from Buenos Aires, Argentina to London.
Margaret	United States	The ship was wrecked in the Abaco Islands. Her crew were rescued. She was on a voyage from Savannah, Georgia to Nassau, Bahamas.
Pearl	United Kingdom	The ship was driven ashore at Thornham, Norfolk. She was on a voyage from London to Wisbech, Cambridgeshire.

== 29 January ==
List of shipwrecks: 29 January 1844
Ship	State	Description
Ann	United Kingdom	The schooner was wrecked on the Brest Rock, in the Firth of Clyde with the loss of all hands. She was on a voyage from Cork to the Clyde.
Arninius	Stettin	The brig was wrecked on Vis, Austrian Empire. She was on a voyage from Stettin to Venice, Kingdom of Lombardy–Venetia.
Eliza Stewart	United Kingdom	HMS Serpent and HMS Wolverine shared salvage money for Eliza Stewart and her cargo for assistance they rendered to Eliza Stewart between 29 January and 25 February 1844.
Malton	United Kingdom	The ship was driven ashore and wrecked at Whitby, Yorkshire. The wreck was refloated on 5 February and towed into Whitby.
Margaret	United Kingdom	The schooner was wrecked on the Bahamas Reef. Her crew were rescued.

== 30 January ==
List of shipwrecks: 30 January 1844
Ship	State	Description
Phœnix	Hamburg	The ship ran aground on the Pagansand, in the North Sea. She was on a voyage from Havana, Cuba to Hamburg. She was refloated on 9 February 1844 and taken into Twielenfleth, Kingdom of Hanover.

== 31 January ==
List of shipwrecks: 31 January 1844
Ship	State	Description
Earl Bathurst	United Kingdom	The ship was driven ashore north of Whitby, Yorkshire. Her crew were rescued. She was refloated on 5 February and taken into Whitby.
Emelie	France	The ship was driven ashore and wrecked 15 nautical miles (28 km) west of Boulogne, Pas-de-Calais. She was on a voyage from Boulogne to Bordeaux, Gironde.
Lamburn	United Kingdom	The ship capsized off Rye, Sussex. She was taken into Rye on 2 February in a leaky condition.
Malton	United Kingdom	The ship was driven ashore and wrecked at Whitby. The wreck was refloated on 5 February and taken into Whitby.
Marie Therese	France	The ship was driven ashore and wrecked near Ajaccio, Corsica. Her crew were rescued. She was on a voyage from the Charente to Marseille, Bouches-du-Rhône.
Phœnix	Hamburg	The ship was lost on the Pagensand, in the North Sea.
Redcliff	United Kingdom	The ship was in collision with a brig and was abandoned. Her crew were rescued.
Syren	United Kingdom	The ship was driven ashore north of Whitby. Her crew were rescued. She was refloated on 5 February and taken into Whitby.
Welsford	(United Kingdom of Great Britain and Ireland) British North America	The ship was severely damaged by fire at Le Bic, Province of Canada.
William Ward	United Kingdom	The barque was abandoned in the English Channel off Calais, France. Her crew were rescued. William Ward was on a voyage from Hull to Athens, Greece. She was subsequently taken into Calais.

== Unknown date ==
List of shipwrecks: Unknown date in January 1844
Ship	State	Description
Anna Maria	France	The ship struck a sunken rock and foundered off Concarneau, Finistère before 18 January. She was on a voyage from Bordeaux, Gironde to Landerneau, Finistère.
Bertha Laura	Denmark	The ship was beached on Fanø. She was on a voyage from Newcastle upon Tyne, Northumberland, United Kingdom to Roskilde.
Black Sea	United Kingdom	The ship was discovered at sea in a derelict condition. She was taken into Calais, France, where she arrived on 1 February.
Brigg	United Kingdom	The brig foundered in the North Sea off the Dudgeon Lightship ( Trinity House). She was on a voyage from the River Trent to London.
Cosan	United Kingdom	The ship was wrecked near Mytilene, Lesbos, Greece. She was on a voyage from the Danube to an English port.
Father Mathew	United Kingdom	The ship was wrecked off Caesar's Creek, Florida Territory. She was on a voyage from St. Stephen's to Matanzas, Cuba.
Friendship	United Kingdom	The ship was driven ashore at Deal, Kent before 20 January. She subsequently became a wreck.
Greyhound	(United Kingdom of Great Britain and Ireland) British North America	The schooner departed from Saint John's, Newfoundland for Sydney, Nova Scotia in early January. No further trace, presumed foundered with the loss of all hands.
James Wilson	United States	The ship was driven ashore near New York. She had been refloated by 19 January and taken into New York.
Jane	United Kingdom	The ship was abandoned in the North Sea before 13 January. She was taken into Grimsby, Lincolnshire.
Johanna	Hamburg	The ship ran aground on the Inner Vogelsand, in the North Sea. She was refloated and taken into Cuxhaven.
L'Egeria	Brazil	The schooner was run ashore on the coast of Sierra Leone before 21 January whilst engaged in the slave trade and being pursued by HMS Spy (Royal Navy). She was consequently condemned.
Lord Lyndoch	United Kingdom	The transport ship was damaged by fire before 4 January. She was on a voyage from Singapore to Madras, India.
Mana	(United Kingdom of Great Britain and Ireland) New Zealand	The schooner was wrecked at Mana before 13 January.
Maria	United Kingdom	The ship was wrecked on the Bœuffs, off "Pilior", France before 23 January. Her crew were rescued by St. Louis (France). Maria was on a voyage from Sunderland, County Durham to Nantes, Loire-Inférieure.
Ocean	United Kingdom	The ship was wrecked near Kingsgate, Kent before 4 January.
Peter Ennes	United States	The ship was driven ashore on Staten Island, New York by ice. She was on a voyage from Trapani, Sicily to New York. She was refloated and taken into port on 26 January.
Sarah	United Kingdom	The ship was abandoned in the North Sea off Flamborough Head, Yorkshire on or before 9 January. She was taken into Grimsby, Lincolnshire.
Traste	Ottoman Empire	The ship was wrecked in the "Sapenize Islands" before 26 January. Her crew were rescued. She was on a voyage from Rodosto to Marseille, Bouches-du-Rhône, France.
William Fulcher	United Kingdom	The ship was driven ashore at "Karakul", 180 nautical miles (330 km) south of Madras before 1 February. She was on a voyage from Bordeaux, Gironde, France to Madras.
