= Benjamin Hobson =

Protestant medical missionary

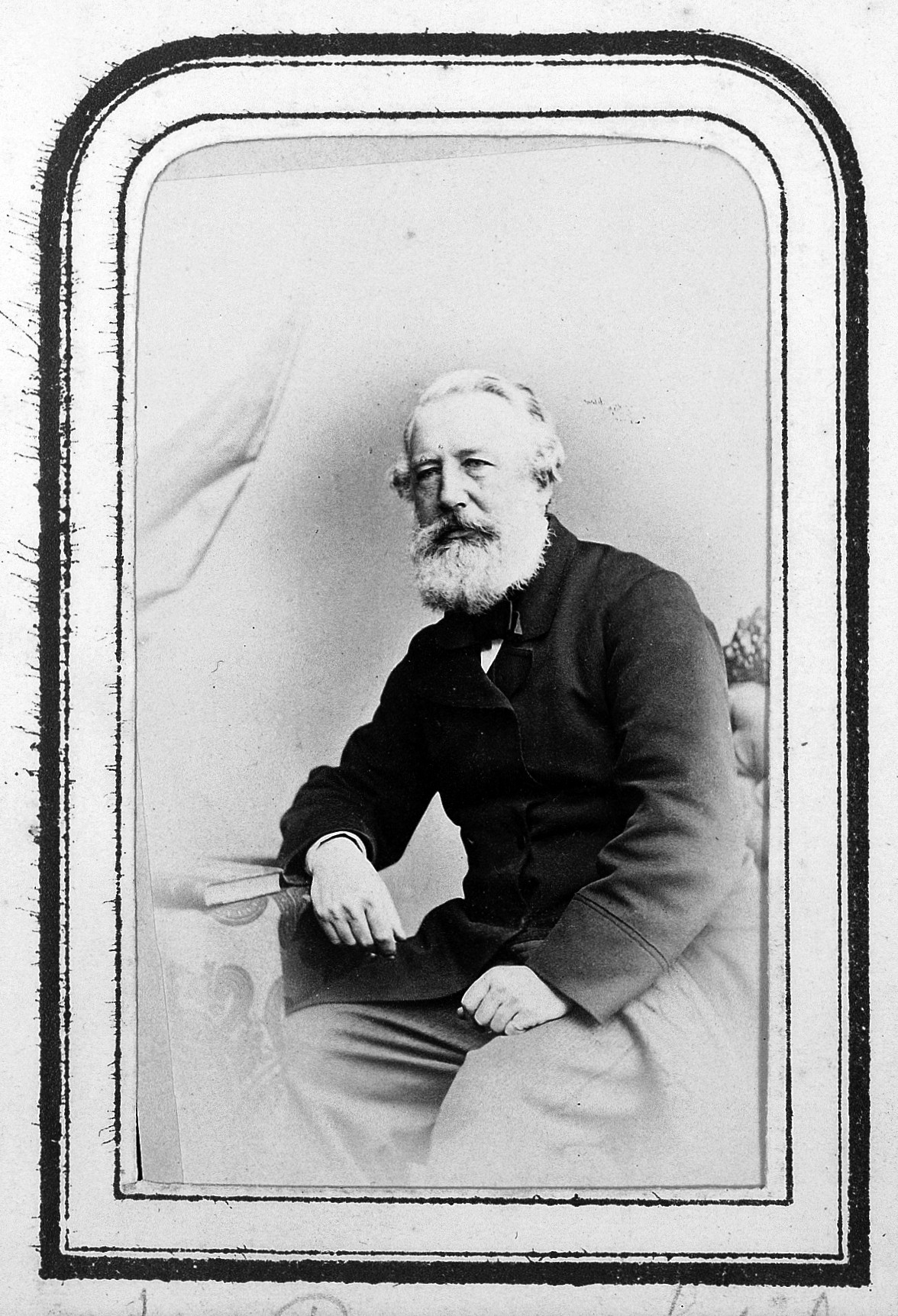
- Benjamin Hobson in Guangzhou

Ho-sin
- Chinese: 合信
Transcriptions
Standard Mandarin
- Hanyu Pinyin: Héxìn
- Wade–Giles: He-hsin
Yue: Cantonese
- Jyutping: Hap^{6}-seon^{3}
Southern Min
- Teochew Peng'im: Hab^{8}-sing^{3}

Benjamin Hobson (1816–1873) (Chinese：合信) was a British Protestant medical missionary who served with the London Missionary Society in imperial China during its Qing dynasty. His Treatise on Physiology, reproducing and elaborating on work by William Cheselden, helped revolutionize Chinese and later Japanese medical understanding and treatment.

== Life ==
Hobson was born in 1816 in Welford, Northamptonshire, in England. He graduated from London University with a MB and passed an examination as a MRCS. Joining the London Missionary Society as a medical missionary to the Qing Empire, he departed with his wife Jane Abbey Hobson and Messrs Legge and Milne on Eliza Stewart. It left London on 28 July 1839, and reached Anyer on 12 November and Macao on 18 December. Assisted by Elijah Bridgman, Hobson found a residence and joined the local Medical Missionary Society. Its hospital reopened on August 1, 1840. When William Lockhart left for Zhoushan at the end of the month and Dr Diver retired from poor health soon afterwards, Hobson was left in sole charge of its operation. In early 1843, he left to establish the Medical Missionary Hospital Hong Kong. This opened to patients on June 1 and the demand for its services so outstripped both expectations and capacity that he relied heavily on help from Chinese assistants. This led him to consider how to explain western medical training to the Chinese, then reliant on often pseudoscientific traditional medicine.

In 1845, his wife's health was so poor that they left for Britain in July but she died while at anchor off Dungeness on December 22. Left with a young son and daughter, he married Rebecca Morrison, the daughter of his fellow Chinese missionary Robert, while in England. He returned with her and Mr Hirschberg on the Hugh Walker. This left Britain on March 11, 1847, and reached Hong Kong on July 27, whereupon he resumed direction of its hospital.

He visited Guangzhou (then known as "Canton") with Mr Gillespie in October 1847 and moved there the next February, operating a clinic out of his residence. In April, he opened a pharmacy and, in June, purchased the house on Kum-Le-Fo (金利埠, Jīnlì Bù, lit. "Golden Benefit Wharf") in the western suburbs for use as the Missionary Hospital or Wo Ai Clinic (t 惠愛醫館, s 惠爱医馆, Huìài Yīguǎn). While there, he was assisted by the Chinese ministers and missionaries Liang Fa and Zhou Xue. At the end of 1854, he traveled to Shanghai for a five-week rest for health reasons. He and his family were forced to evacuate to Hong Kong in October 1856 on account of the onset of the Second Opium War.

The missionary community of Shanghai prevailed upon him to return in February 1857 and he took Dr Lockhart's place at their hospital when Lockhart returned to England at the end of that year. His eldest son took work with a merchant house, but the rest of the family returned with him to Europe, reaching England in March 1859. His health not permitting his return to China, he then resided at Clifton and Cheltenham. He died at Forest Hill near London in 1873.

== Works ==
Benjamin Hobson published the following works: (Note: Chinese titles are given in modern traditional characters, some of which—such as those preceded by the silk radical—vary slightly from their 19th-century forms. Romanizations include both modern pinyin and the contemporary romanization. Translations are Wylie's.)

- Dialogues in the Canton Vernacular, Guangzhou, 1850. (in English) & (in Chinese)
- 《惠爱醫館年記》 [Huìài Yīguǎn Niánjì or Hwuy Gae E Kwan Nëen Ke, Annual Report of the Missionary Hospital at Canton], Guangzhou, 1850. (in Chinese)
- 《全體新論》 [Quántǐ Xīnlún or Tseuen T'e Sin Lun, Treatise on Physiology], Guangzhou, 1851. (Note: Also translated as A New Theory of the Body.) (in Chinese)
- 《上帝辨證》 [Shàngdì Biànzhèng or Shang Te Pëen Ching, Theological Evidences], Guangzhou, 1852. (in Chinese)
- 《約翰真經釋解》 [Yuēhàn Zhēnjīng Shìxiè or Yo Han Chin King Shih Keae, Commentary on John's Gospel], Hong Kong, 1853. (in Chinese)
- 《祈禱式文》 [Qídǎo Shìwén or K'e Taou Shih Wan, Forms of Prayer], Guangzhou, 1854, revised ed. 1865. (in Chinese)
- 《問答良言》 [Wèndá Liángyán or Wan Ta Lëang Yen, Catechism of Christian Principles], Guangzhou, 1855, reprinted at Shanghai 1857. (in Chinese)
- 《信德之解》 [Xìndé zhī Xiè or Sin Tih Che Keae, Explanation of Faith], Guangzhou, 1855. (in Chinese)
- 《博物新編》 [Bówù Xīnbiān or Po Wuh Sin Pëen, Natural Philosophy], Guangzhou, 1854. (in Chinese)
- 《聖書擇錦》 [Shèngshū Zéjǐn or Shing Shoo Tsih Kin, Selections from the Holy Scriptures], Guangzhou, 1856. (in Chinese)
- 《古訓撮要》 [Gǔxùn Cuōyāo or Koo Huen Tsuy Yaou, Important Extracts from Ancient Authors], Guangzhou, 1856. (in Chinese)
- 《基督降世傳》 [Jīdū Jiàngshì Chuán or Ke Tuh Këang She Chuen, Advent of Christ], Guangzhou. (in Chinese)
- 《聖地不收貪骨論》 [Shèngdì Bù Shōu Tāngǔ Lún or Shing T'e Puh Show T'an Kuh Lun, Covetousness Excluded from Heaven], Guangzhou. (in Chinese)
- 《聖主耶穌啓示聖差保羅復活之理》 [Shèngzhǔ Yēsū Qǐshì Shèng Chā Bǎoluó Fùhuó zhī Lǐ or Shing Choo Yay Soo K'e She Shing Chae Paou Lo Fuh Hwo Che Le, The Doctrine of the Resurrection as Revealed to Paul by the Lord Jesus], Guangzhou. (in Chinese)
- 《詩篇》 [Shīpiān or She Pëen, Hymns], Guangzhou. (in Chinese)
- 《論仁愛之要》 [Lún Rénài zhī Yāo or Lun Jin Gae Che Yaou, The Importance of Love], Guangzhou, (in Chinese) including translations of some New Testament chapters
- Annual Reports for Nine Years of the Missionary Hospital at Canton, Shanghai, 1857.
- 《西醫略論》 [Xīyī Lüèlún or Se E Lëo Lun, First Lines on the Practice of Surgery in the West], Shanghai, 1857. (in Chinese)
- A Medical Vocabulary in English and Chinese, Shanghai, 1858. (in English) & (in Chinese)
- 《婦嬰新説》 [Fùyīng Xīnshuō or Foo Ying Sin Shwo, Treatise on Midwifery and Diseases of Children], Shanghai, 1858. (in Chinese)
- 《内科新誡》 [Nèikē Xīnjiè or Nuy K'o Sin Shwo, Practice of Medicine and Materia Medica], Shanghai, 1858. (in Chinese)
- "Dr. Hobson's Reports of the Hospitals at Macao and Hongkong", Chinese Repository, vol. 10, 11, 13, & 17.

Five of the medical works were published with assistance from Kuan Mao-tsai. The illustrations of his Treatise on Physiology were derived from William Cheselden's 1730 Anatomical Tables and 1733 Osteographia. Hobson's work has been called "instrumental" in introducing Western anatomical knowledge to China and Japan, beginning their shift away from traditional understandings based on the flow of qi and other pseudoscience. The third part of Hobson’s book, 《博物新編》[Bówù Xīnbiān], authored by both Hobson and Chen Xiutang, was the basis of Chen’s own book, 《博物新編圖説》[Bówù Xīnbiān Túshuō] (Shanghai, 1898).

== See also ==
- Protestantism
- Peter Parker and John Kenneth MacKenzie
