= Elizabeth Stewart =

Elizabeth Stewart may refer to:

- Elizabeth Stewart, Countess of Crawford (fl. 1300s), daughter of Robert II of Scotland and Euphemia de Ross
- Elizabeth Stewart (daughter of Robert III) (c. 1372 – c. 1411), Scottish princess
- Elizabeth Stewart, Countess of Arran (c. 1554–1590), Scottish aristocrat and political intriguer
- Elizabeth Stewart, 2nd Countess of Moray (1565–1591), Scottish noblewoman and cousin of King James VI
- Elizabeth Stewart (singer) (1939–2022), Scottish singer
- Liz Stewart (born 1961), American interior designer, actress and model
- Betsy Stewart, fictional character on As The World Turns

== See also ==
- Elizabeth Stuart (disambiguation)
- Eliza Stewart (disambiguation)
- Lizbeth Stewart (1948–2013), American ceramist
