= Medical Missionary Hospital Hong Kong =

- London Missionary Society

Geography
- Location: Morrison Hill, Hong Kong, United Kingdom

History
- Opened: 1843
- Closed: 1853

Links
- Lists: Hospitals in the United Kingdom

Medical Missionary Hospital Hong Kong was an early hospital in colonial Hong Kong that operated from 1843 to 1853 at Morrison Hill. It provided Western medical care to Chinese residents of Hong Kong.

== History ==
Founded by the London Missionary Society in 1843 after relocating from Macau where the missionary society operated the Missionary Hospital of Macao from 1838 to 1842. The hospital was led by Benjamin Hobson from 1842 to 1845.

The hospital was closed in 1853 due to lack of medical staff. The site is now home to the Salvation Army Education and Development Centre.
