= Basque Museum of the History of Medicine and Science =

Museum in the Spanish Basque Country

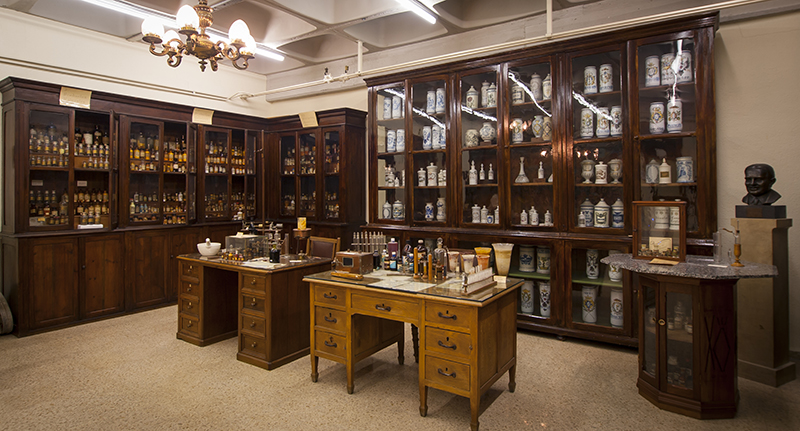
Pharmacy Room of Basque Museum of the History of Medicina and Science

The Basque Museum of the History of Medicine (MHM, Basque: Medikuntza Historiaren Euskal Museoa, Spanish: Museo Vasco de Historia de la Medicina) was founded in 1982 to preserve and conserve the historic memory of medicine and scientific heritage of Basque Country. The Museum is located on the university campus of Leioa (University of the Basque Country) and is important in student training in the Faculty of Medicine and other faculties and schools. Its director is Anton Erkoreka.

Its permanent exhibition comprises approximately 6,000 medical objects of the 19th and 20th centuries, thematically arranged in 24 rooms devoted to different medical specialties: folk medicine, unconventional medicine, pharmacy, weights and measures, asepsis and antisepsis, microscopes, laboratory material, X-rays, obstetrics and gynaecology, surgery, anesthesia, endoscope, odontology, cardiology, ophthalmology, electrotherapy, pathological anatomy and natural sciences. It also holds virtual exhibitions.

Teaching and research constitute the two pillars of the Museum, complemented with publications, the organization of conferences, lectures, and other activities.

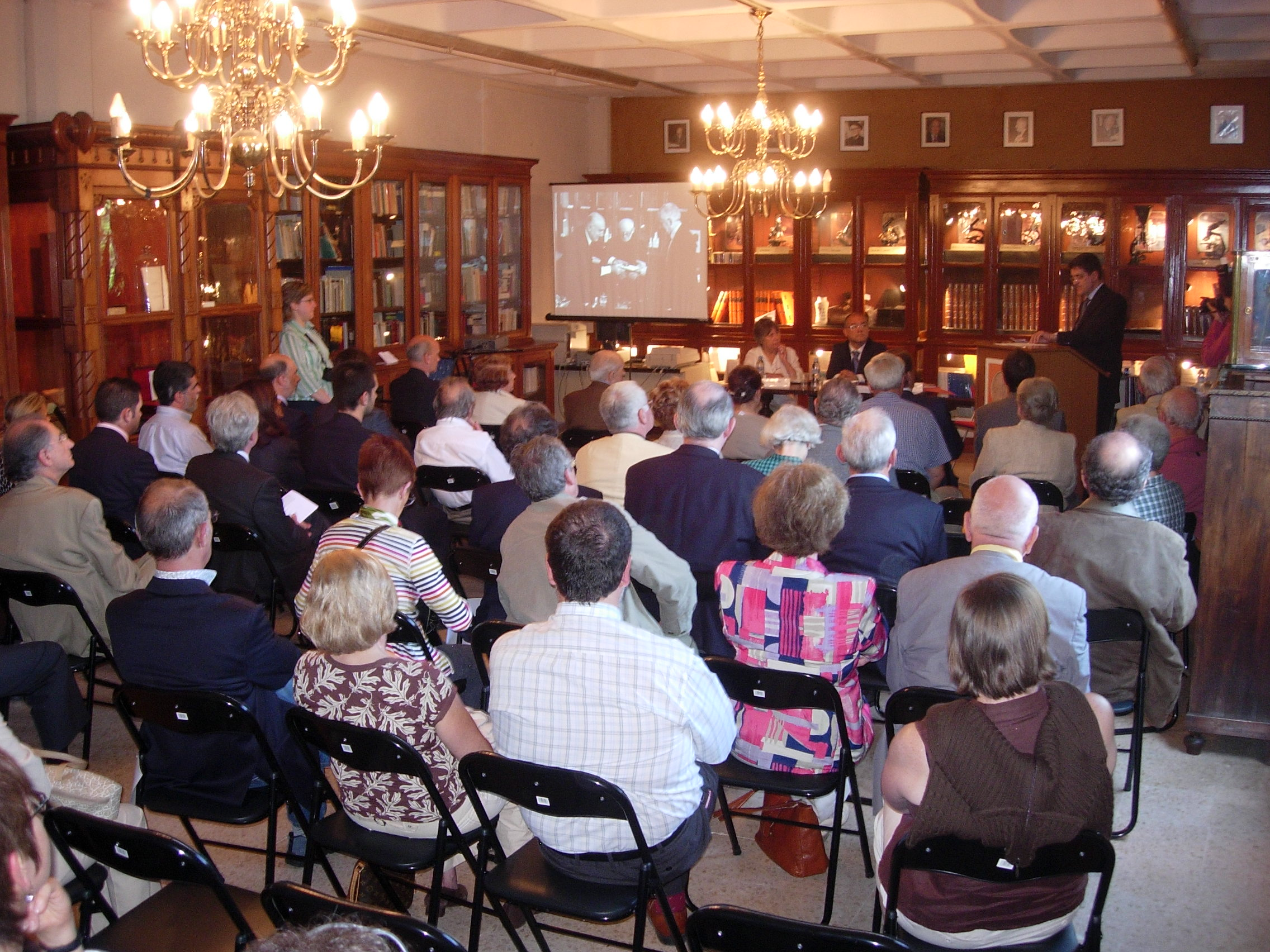
Academic Event (SFHM, May 2007)

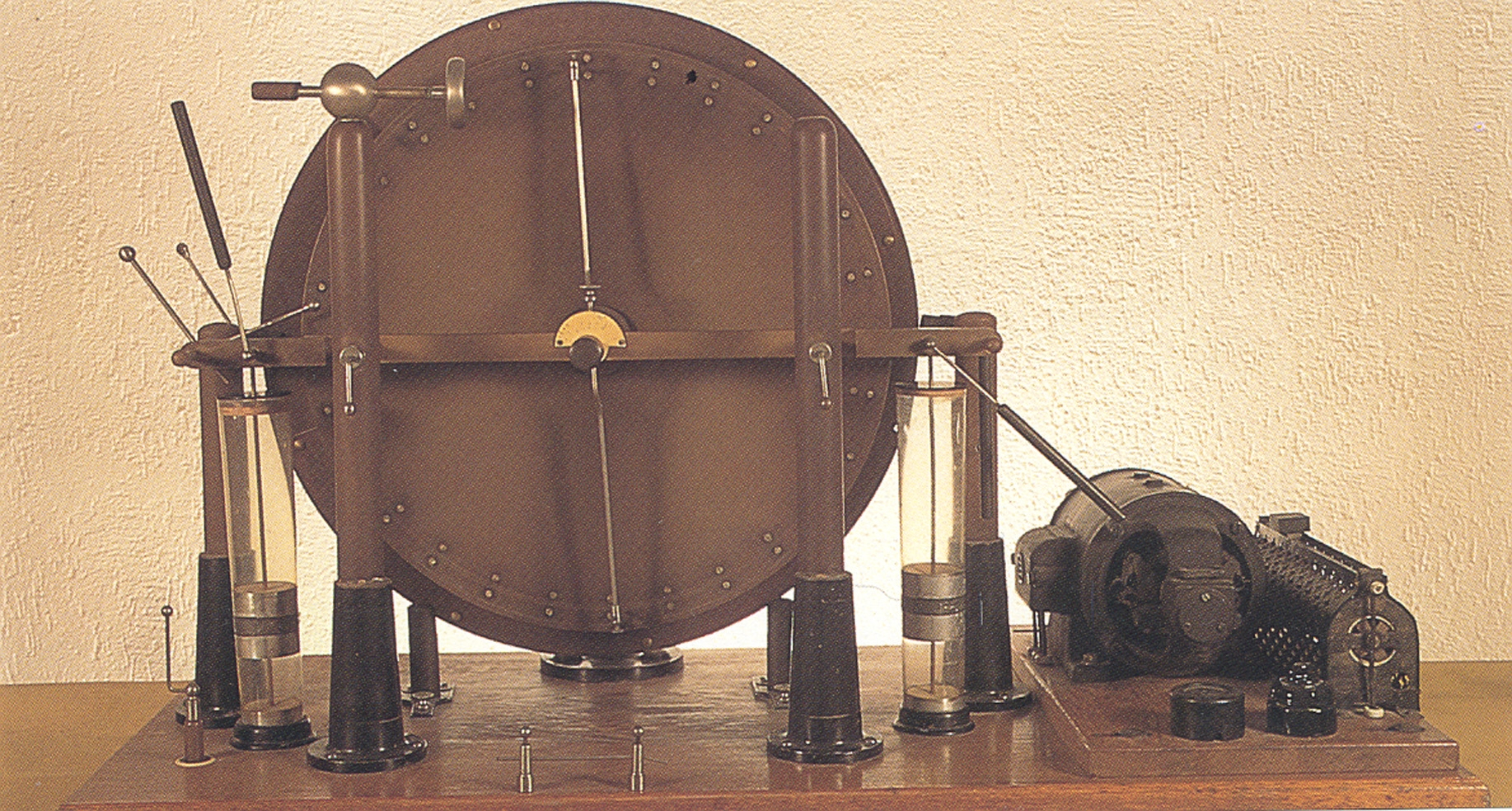
Wimshurst Electrostatic Generator (around 1900)

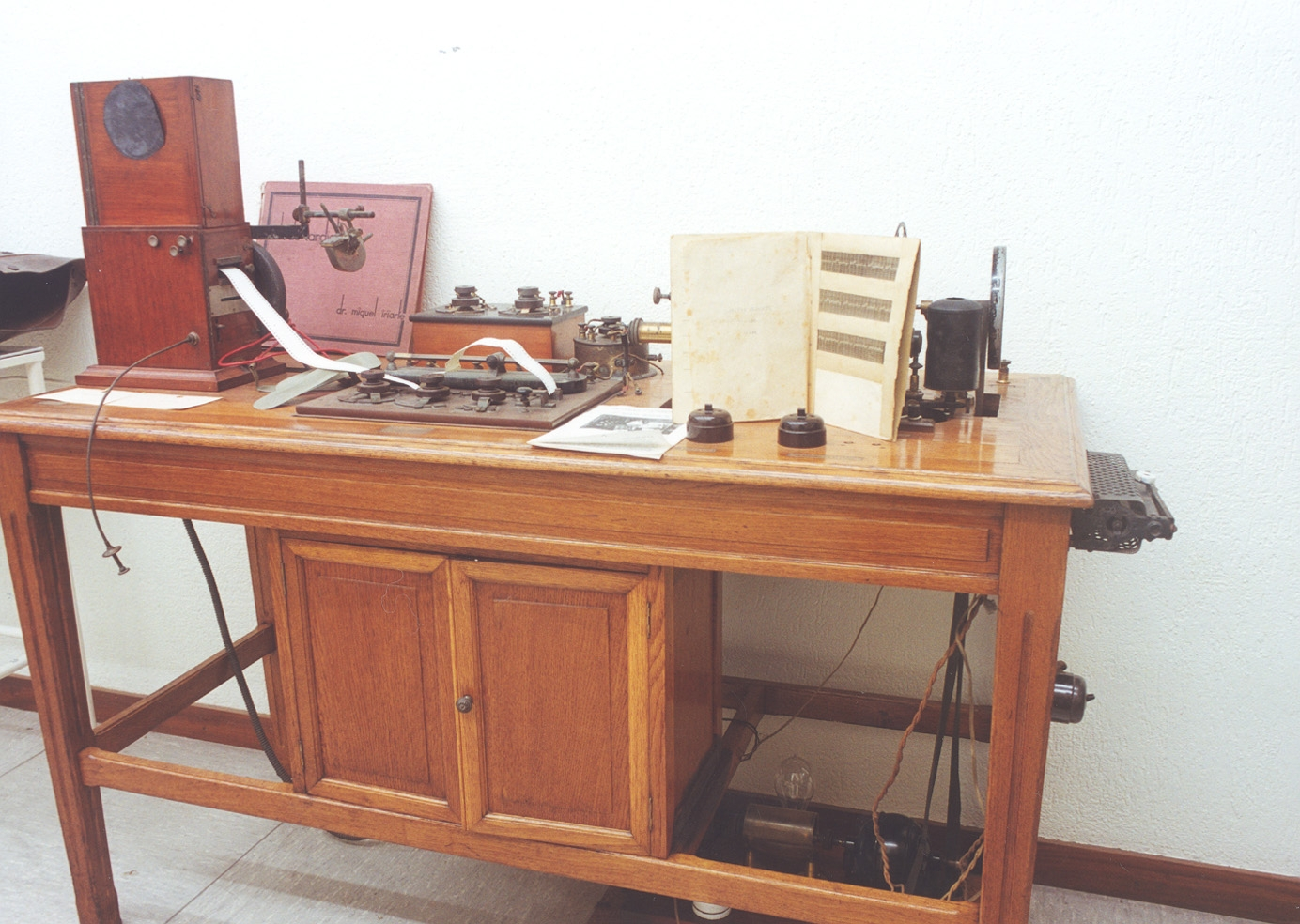
Brevet SGDG Electrocardiographe - G. Boulitte (Paris) (around 1918)

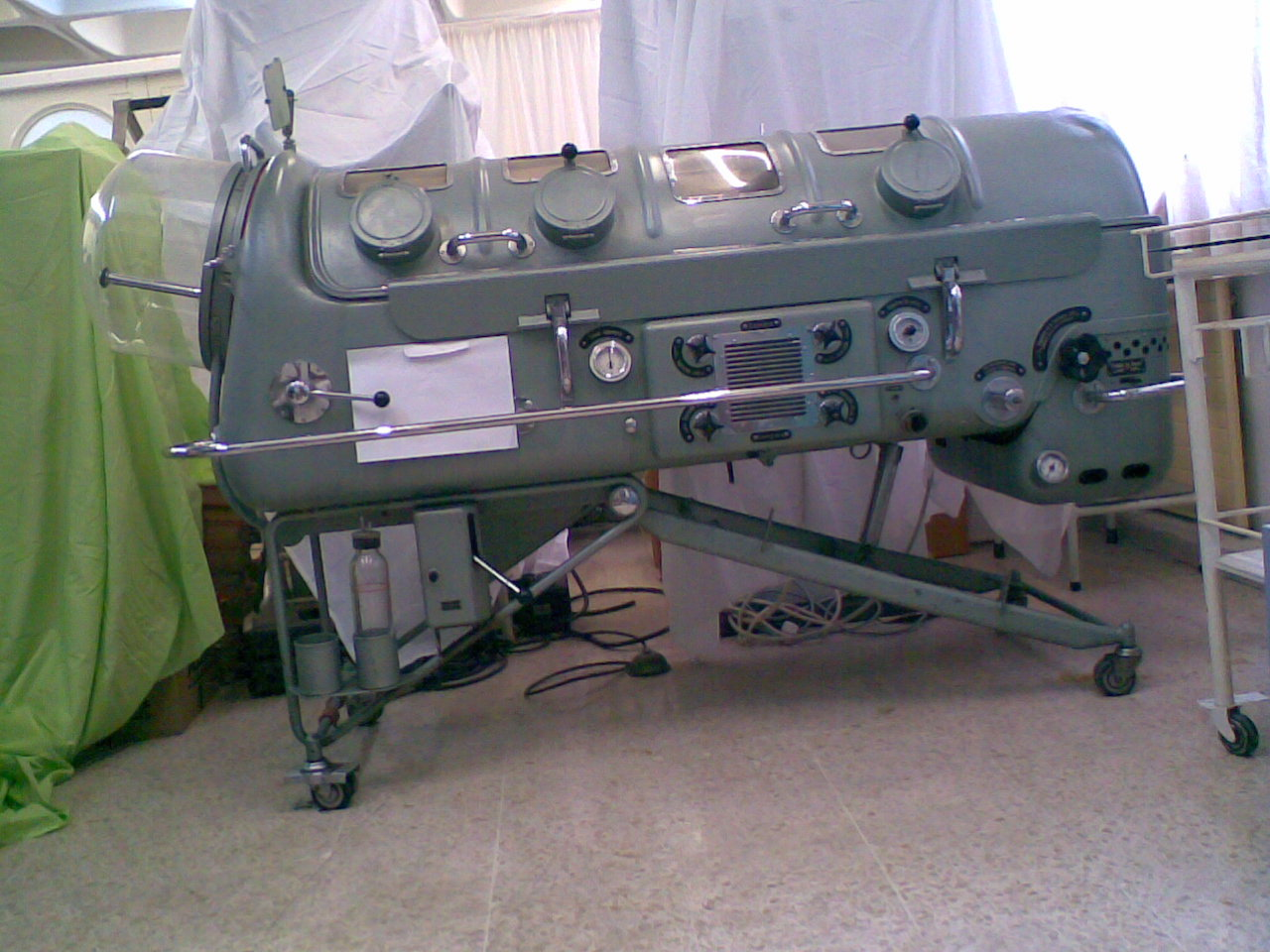
Steel lung (mid 20th Century)

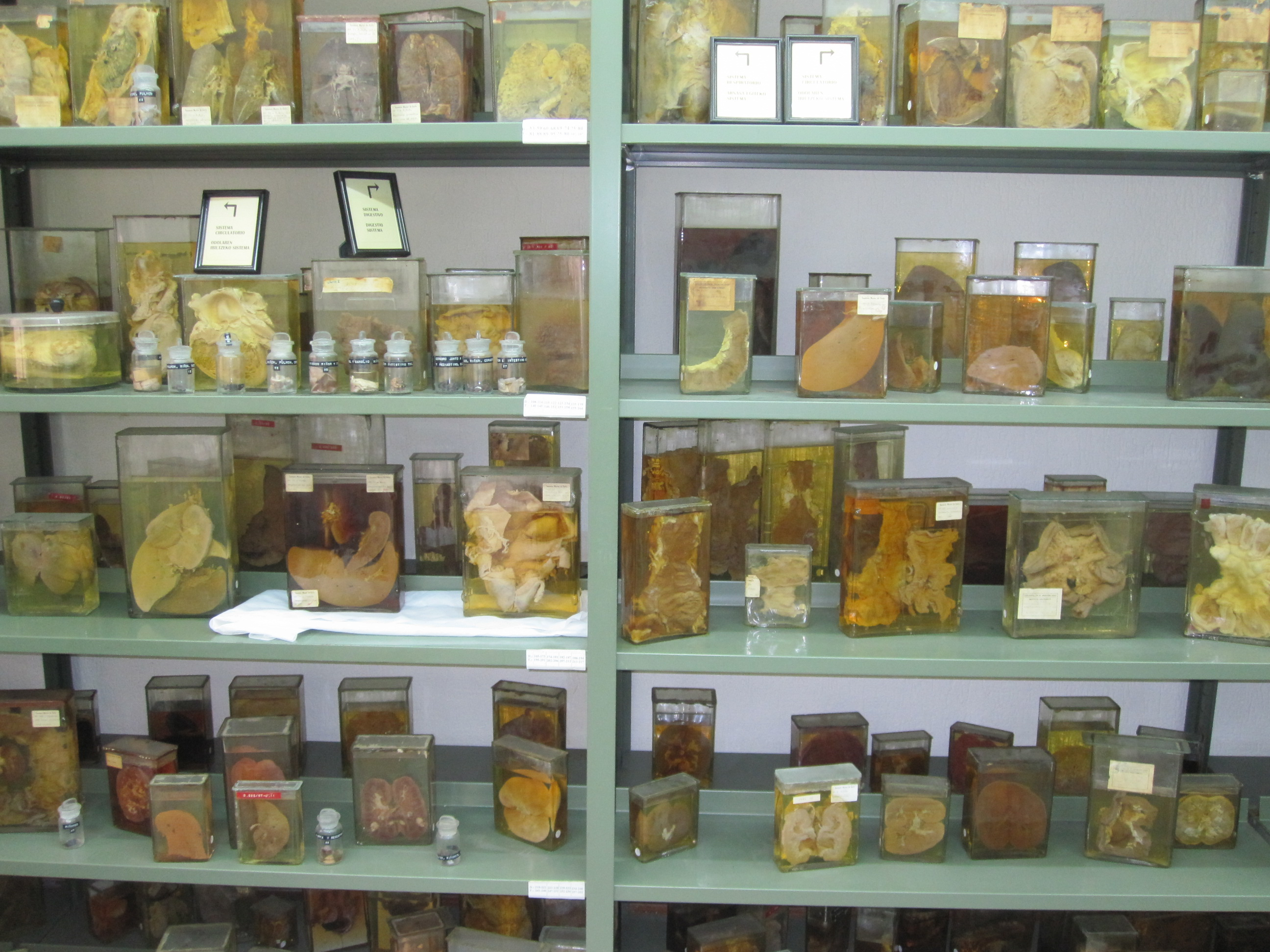
Pathological Anatomy Room

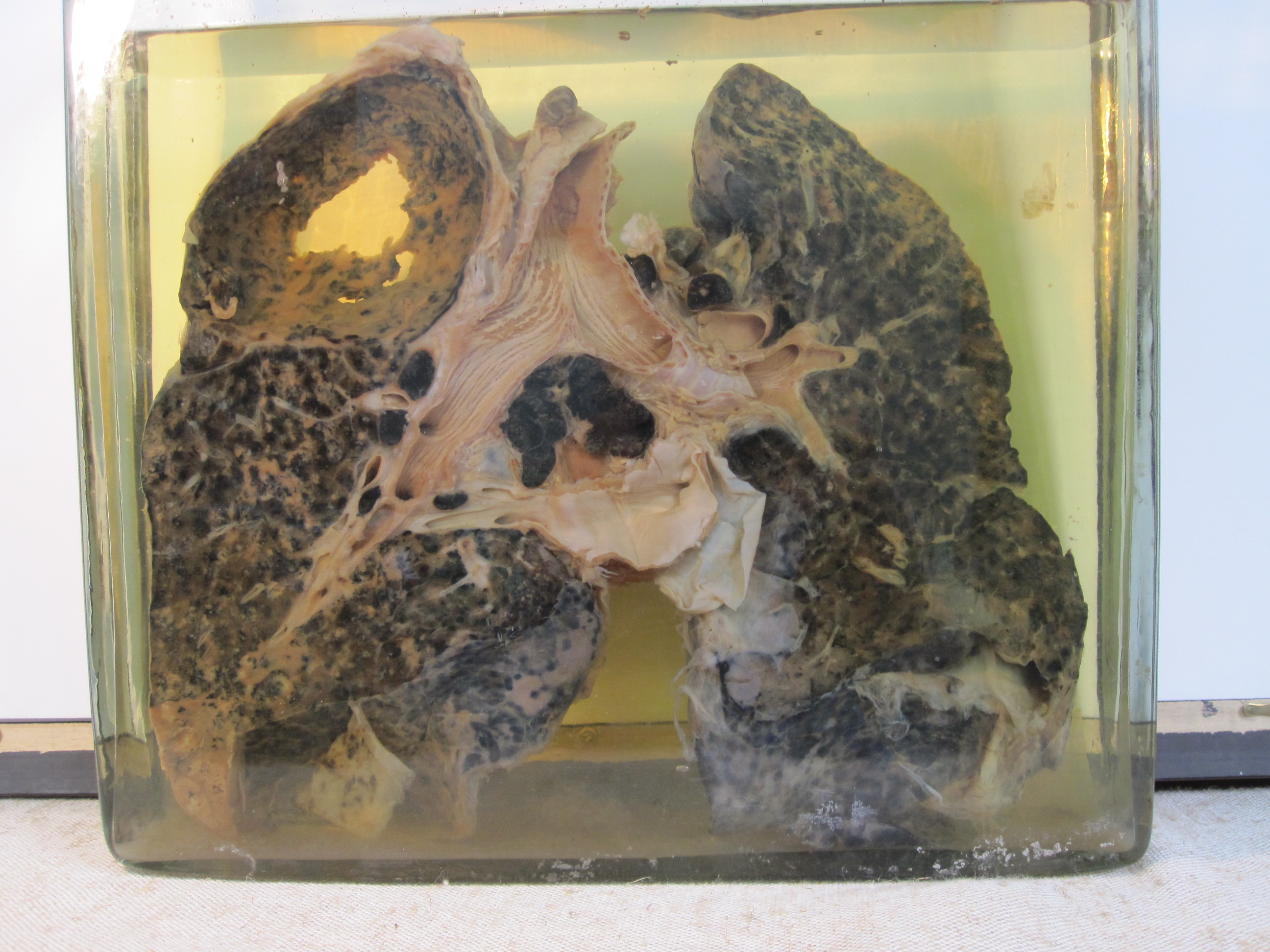
Miner's lung with silicosis and tuberculosis

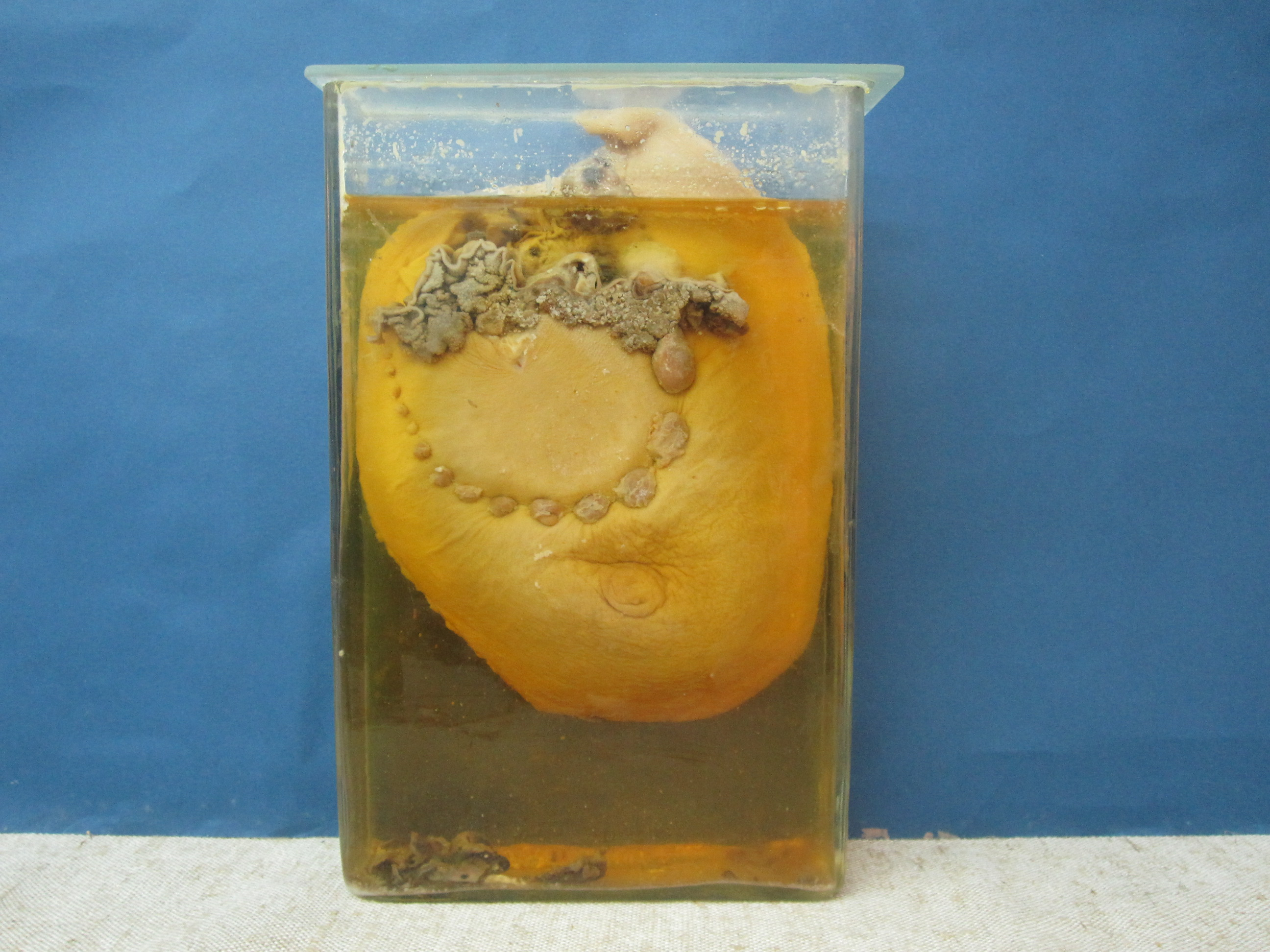
Breast cancer

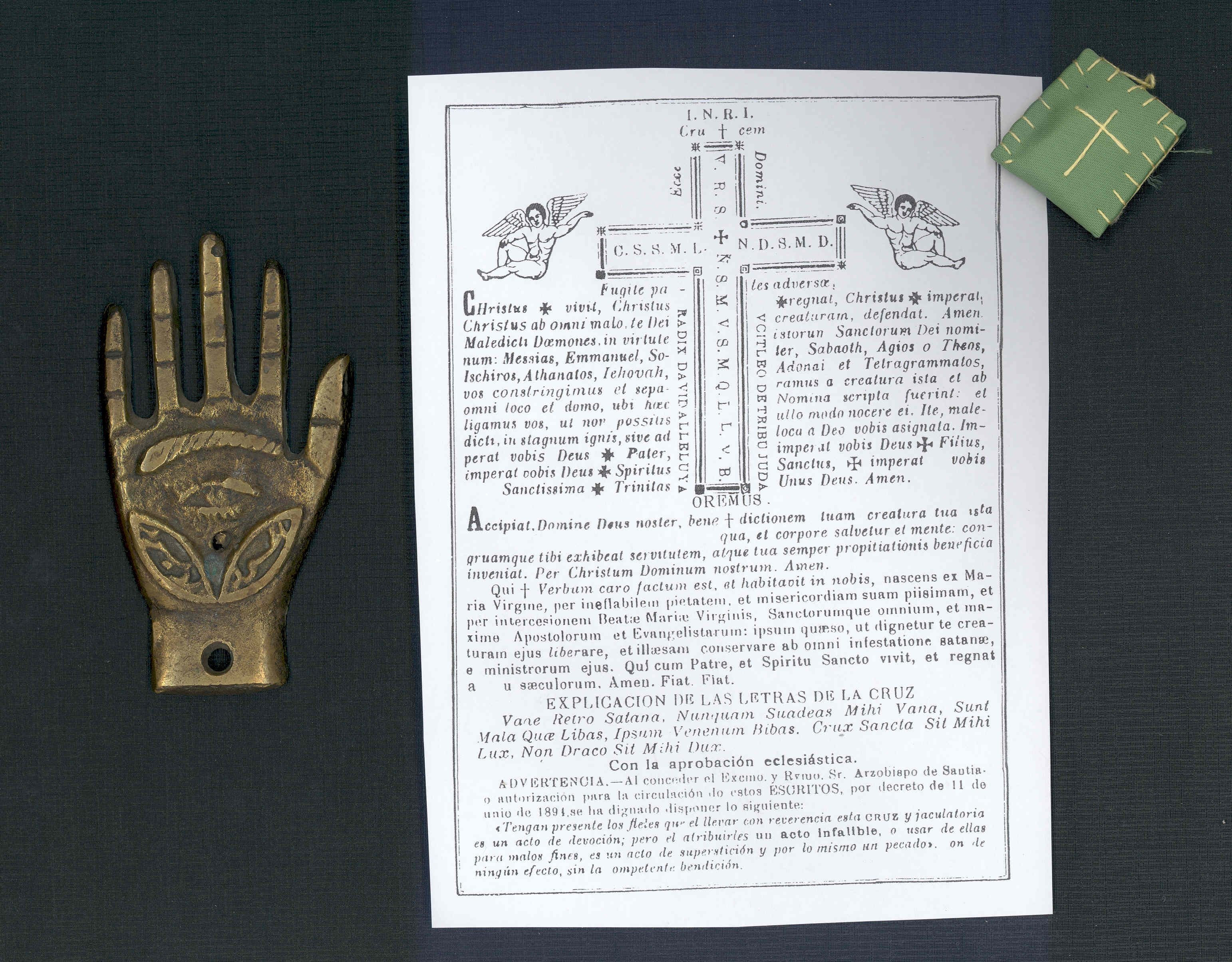
Amulets against the evil eye

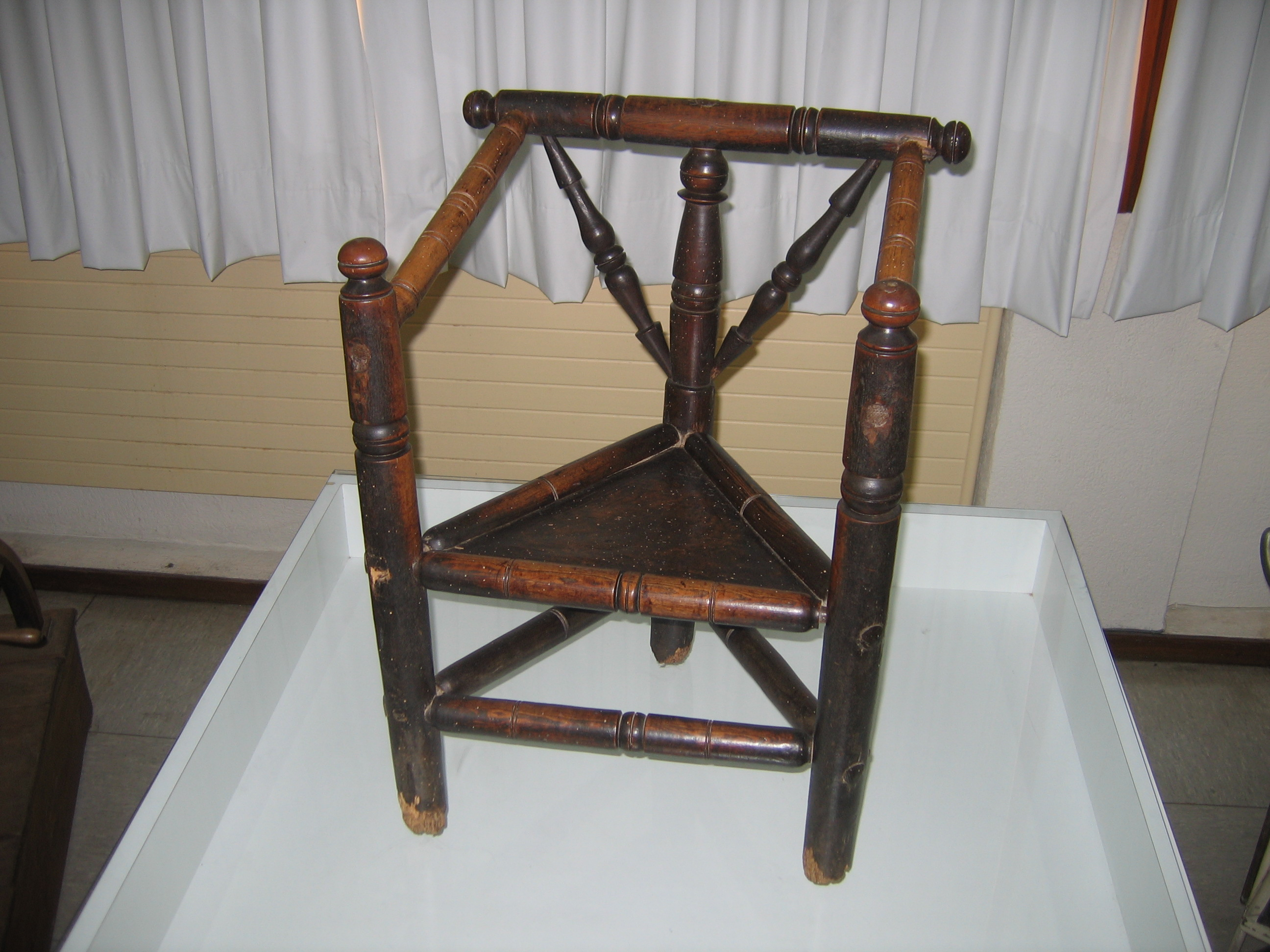
Labor chair (18th Century)
