= Histoire des sciences médicales =

- Discipline: History of medicine, history of science
- Language: French

Publication details
- History: 1967-present
- Publisher: Éditions de Médecine Pratique (France)
- Frequency: Quarterly

Standard abbreviations
- ISO 4: Hist. Sci. Méd.

Indexing
- ISSN: 0440-8888

Links
- Journal homepage; Online access

Histoire des sciences médicales is a French academic journal established in 1967. It covers the fields of history of medicine and science. It is the official journal of the Société Française d'Histoire de la Médecine. It is abstracted and indexed in MEDLINE/PubMed and FRANCIS.
