= Eliza Stewart (1845 ship) =

Sailing ship built 1845

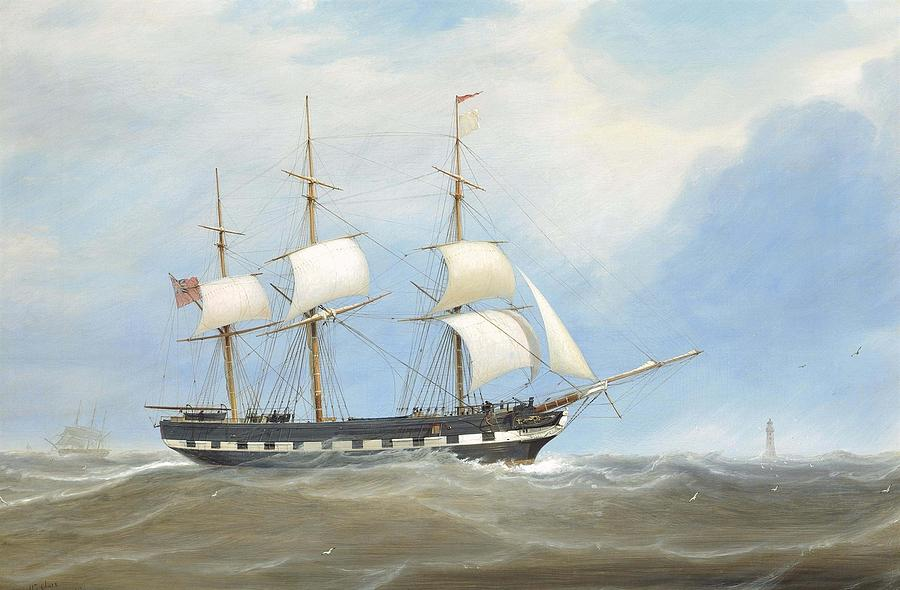
- Eliza Stewart under reduced sail in the Channel off the Eddystone lighthouse, William Clark (Greenock: 1803-1883)

History

United Kingdom
- Name: Eliza Stewart
- Launched: 1845
- Fate: Wrecked c.1865

General characteristics
- Tons burthen: 442 (old) & 524 (new), or 495 (bm)
- Length: 115 ft 3 in (35.1 m)
- Beam: 26 ft 4 in (8.0 m)
- Depth: 20 ft 3 in (6.2 m)
- Notes: Three masts

Eliza Stewart was a sailing ship built in 1845 at "Brkw'r". Among other roles, she carried coolies between India and Trinidad. She was wrecked c.1865.

== Career ==
Eliza Stewart first appeared in Lloyd's Register in 1855 with Henderson, master, Stewart & Co., owners, and trade Newport–Ceylon

Year	Master	Owner	Trade	Home port	Notes
1846	Henderson	Stewart & Co.	Newport–Ceylon; Liverpool-Calcutta	Greenock	
1850	Henderson	Stewart & Co.	Newport–Ceylon; Liverpool-Calcutta	Greenock	Damages repaired in 1847

On 31 August 1847 a typhoon struck Hong Kong, the first since the island became a British colony. Eliza Stewart would have ridden out the typhoon but the British iron bark John Laird drifted against her and drove her against Dos Hermanos. Eliza Stewart was so damaged that she had to discharge her cargo of sugar for Shanghae to effect repairs.

Eliza Stewart carried coolies from India to Trinidad in three voyages. She left Calcutta prior to 5 February 1851 with 159 men, 12 women, and seven children and infants, for a total of 178 persons. She landed 176 on 23 April.

Eliza Stewart also carried coolies from Trinidad back to India when their five-year terms of indenture were up. A bounty scheme gave the immigrants $50 if they extended their term in Trinidad by five years. Although most Indians brought over remained in Trinidad, some would return home with substantial savings. On 31 May 1851 Eliza Stewart carried 20 back to Calcutta. The fare was £20 per person: £10 for Trinidad to Greenock, and £10 for Greenock to Calcutta.

Eliza Steward arrived at Trinidad again on 30 April 1852 with 183 immigrants, three having died on the voyage. Lastly, on 13 May 1853 Eliza Stewart landed 214 immigrants, six having died on the voyage.

Year	Master	Owner	Trade	Home port	Notes
1855	H. Baird	Stewart	Lithgow–Calcutta	Greenock	Small repairs 1854
1860	Oppenheim	Fellows	London–Australia	London	Small repairs 1859
1865	H. Osborne	Dixon & Co.	Liverpool–China	Liverpool	

== Fate ==
Eliza Stewart's entry in Lloyd's Register for 1865 has the annotation Wrecked.
