= Eliza Stewart (1833 ship) =

History

United Kingdom
- Name: Eliza Stewart
- Owner: J. & W. Stewart, Greenock
- Builder: Robert Steele & Company, Greenock
- Launched: 1833
- Fate: Last listed 1843; wrecked 1844; struck 1844

General characteristics
- Tons burthen: 423 or 424, or 428 (bm)
- Notes: Three masts

Eliza Stewart was a sailing ship built in 1833. She traded with Australia, China, and India and was last listed in 1843, having wrecked in early 1844.

== History ==
Eliza Stewart entered the Register of Shipping in 1833 with Miller, master, Stewart, owner, and trade London-Bombay.

In 1841 a group of passengers who had sailed from London to Australia on the ship published a letter in The Sydney Morning Herald thanking Captain Robert Millar for his "polite, kind and gentlemanly conduct" to them on the voyage and noting the "very liberal manner in which we were provided and our comforts attended to whilst on board his ship", and thanking Messrs Phillips and Tiplady as charterers of the ship.

Eliza Stewart was last listed in Lloyd's Register in 1843 with McLeod, master, Stewart, owner, homeport of Glasgow, and trade London-Bombay.

HMS Serpent and HMS Wolverine shared salvage money for Eliza Stewart and her cargo for assistance they rendered to Eliza Stewart between 29 January and 25 February 1844. (Note: A prize money notice refers to Eliza Stewart as having wrecked. A Commander's share of the prize money was worth £30 5s 0¾d; a fifth-class share (that of an able or ordinary seaman) was worth 19s 7¼d. The award levels were per the 3 February 1836 proclamation "for the Distribution of Prize Money in the Navy".)
