= Fullerton (surname) =

Fullerton is a surname. Notable people with the surname include:

- Alexander Fullerton (1924–2008), British author of Naval and Marine novels
- C. Gordon Fullerton (1936–2013), American astronaut and NASA research pilot
- Charlotte Fullerton (born 1949), American author
- Curt Fullerton (1898–1975), American major League baseball player
- David Fullerton (1772–1843), member of the U.S. House of Representatives from Pennsylvania
- Donald B. Fullerton (1892–1985), Christian missionary and Bible teacher
- Ed Fullerton (1931–2015), former American footballer
- Eddie Fullerton (1935–1991), Sinn Féin councillor from County Donegal
- Elizabeth Fullerton (born 1953), Australian lawyer, judge of the Supreme Court of New South Wales
- Eric Fullerton (1878–1962), British Royal Navy officer
- Fiona Fullerton (born 1956), English actress
- George Fullerton (cricketer) (1922–2002), South African cricketer
- George Stuart Fullerton (1859–1925), American psychologist and writer
- George William Fullerton (1921–2009), American guitar innovator, (associate of Leo Fender)
- Lady Georgiana Fullerton (1812–1885), English novelist
- Hugh Fullerton (1873–1945), American sportswriter
- Jackie Fullerton (born 1943), Northern Irish television presenter
- James Fullerton (ice hockey) (1909–1991), American ice hockey coach and referee
- John Fullerton (disambiguation), multiple people
- Mary Eliza Fullerton (1868–1946), Australian writer
- Maryellen Fullerton, American lawyer and interim dean and law professor of law at Brooklyn Law School
- Mathias Fullerton (born 2003), Danish archer
- Michael Fullerton (born 1971), Scottish artist
- Robert Fullerton (1773–1831), Scottish governor of Penang, Malaysia
- Spencer Fullerton Baird (1823–1887), American ornithologist
- Terry Fullerton, (born 1953), British racing driver
- Thomas Fullerton (Wisconsin pioneer) (1817–1889), American Methodist minister and pioneer
- Ticky Fullerton (born 1963), Australian business journalist
- Tracy Fullerton (born 1965), American game designer
- Travis Fullerton, American musician
- William Young Fullerton (1857–1932), Irish Baptist preacher

== See also ==
- Fullarton (disambiguation) § Surname
