= William Fullarton (disambiguation) =

William Fullarton was a Scottish politician.

William Fullarton may also refer to:

- William Fullarton (footballer) (1882–?), Scottish football player
- William Fullarton (priest) (died 1655), Archdeacon of Armagh

== See also ==
- William Fullerton (disambiguation)
- Fullarton (disambiguation)
