= FPL =

FPL may refer to:

== Government and politics ==
- Federal Poverty Level, in the United States
- Forest Products Laboratory, of the United States Forest Service
- Free Party of Luxembourg, a defunct political party in Luxembourg
- Fuerzas Populares de Liberación Farabundo Martí, a defunct Salvadoran guerrilla organization
- Liberal People's Party (Sweden) (Swedish: Folkpartiet liberalerna), a political party in Sweden
- Popular Liberation Front (Guatemala) (Spanish: Frente Popular Libertador), a defunct political party in Guatemala

== Other uses ==
- FA Premier League, original name of the English top division league
- Federation Professional League, a defunct South African football league
- Feline panleukopenia, a viral infection affecting cats
- Fiji Premier League, a football league in Fiji
- Filipino Premier League, a football league of the Philippines
- Fantasy Premier League, a fantasy football game
- Film and Photo League, a defunct artist collective
- Flexor pollicis longus muscle, a muscle in the forearm and hand
- Flight plan, documents indicating an aircraft's planned route
- Florida Power & Light, an American utility company
- Frederick and Pennsylvania Line Railroad Company, a defunct American railroad
- French Polynesia, UNDP country code
- Fullerton Public Library, in Fullerton, California, United States
- Functional programming language
