= Fullerton =

Fullerton may refer to:

== Places ==
=== Australia ===
- Fullerton Cove, New South Wales
- Fullerton, New South Wales

=== Canada ===
- Cape Fullerton, Nunavut

=== United States ===
- Fullerton, California, a city in Orange County
  - California State University, Fullerton (commonly CSUF), part of the California State University System
    - Fullerton Arboretum, a botanical-garden located on the north-east corner of the CSUF campus.
  - Fullerton College, the oldest continuously operating community college in California
  - Fullerton Union High School, a high school created in 1893
  - Fullerton (Amtrak station), a passenger rail and bus station
  - Fullerton Municipal Airport, a Regional Relief airport
  - Fullerton Police Department, established in 1904
  - Fullerton Public Library, established in 1906
- Fullerton, Louisiana
- Fullerton, Maryland, an unincorporated community in Baltimore County
- Fullerton, Nebraska, a city in Nance County
- Fullerton Township, Nance County, Nebraska
- Fullerton, North Dakota, a city in Dickey County
- Fullerton, Pennsylvania, a census-designated place in Lehigh County
- Fullerton (CTA), a Chicago rapid transit station on the 'L'

=== United Kingdom ===
- Fullerton, Hampshire, on the river Test, between Andover and Stockbridge

== Other uses ==
- Fullerton (surname)
- Fullerton (greyhound), winner of the Waterloo Cup four times over.
- Fullerton Dam, a ruined former dam in western Oklahoma, U.S.
- Fullerton Health Group, a healthcare provider based in Singapore
- Fullerton Line, a former train route in California, U.S.

== See also ==
- The Fullerton Hotel Singapore
- Fullarton (disambiguation)
