= William Fullerton =

William Fullerton may refer to:

- William Fullerton (politician) (1888–?), Australian politician
- William Young Fullerton (1857–1932), Irish hymnwriter
- William Morton Fullerton (1865–1952), American journalist
- William Fullerton (lawyer) (1817–1900), American lawyer
- William Fullerton Jr. (1854–1888), his son, American-born composer in London
- Billy Fullerton, see the song Billy Boys
- William Fullerton (diplomat) (born 1939), British diplomat
- William Fullerton (surgeon) (died 1805), Scottish surgeon

== See also ==
- William Fullarton (disambiguation)
