= Elizabeth Cotton =

Elizabeth Cotton may refer to:

- Elizabeth Cotton, Lady Hope (1842–1922), née Cotton, British evangelist
- Elizabeth Cotten (1893–1987), American singer-songwriter
- Liz Cotton, fictional character in EastEnders
