= Thomas Denny =

Thomas Denny may refer to:

- T. A. Denny (1818–1909), Irish businessman
- Thomas Denny (artist) (born 1956), British painter and stained glass artist
