= Mount Rushmore (band) =

American rock band

Mount Rushmore was an American rock band in the late 1960s from San Francisco, California, United States, that played a heavy blues rock style with psychedelic elements. AllMusic described the outfit as "also-rans of the San Francisco psychedelic era". They were named after Mount Rushmore, South Dakota.

== History ==
The band formed in early 1967 at 1915 Oak Street, a large Victorian rooming house in the Haight-Ashbury district. The original members were Ed Levin (ex-Vipers), Warren Phillips (ex Blue House Basement), Thomas Dotzler, Mike Bolan and Danny Wei. Wei was soon replaced by Terry Kimble on bass guitar. In June and July 1967, they were featured on posters for shows at the Avalon Ballroom. In June 1967, Mount Rushmore played two sets at The KFRC Fantasy Fair and Magic Mountain Music Festival. In March 1968, Dotzler left to join local band Phoenix, and was soon followed by Phillips and Levin. Bolan and Kimble added Glenn Smith and Travis Fullerton to the line up and this line-up made two albums.

== Members on the recordings ==
- Mike "Bull" Bolan — guitar
- Glenn "Smitty" Smith — vocals, guitar
- Travis Fullerton — drums, percussion
- Terry Kimble — bass

Warren B. Phillips was the former lead singer of the band, and wrote a few songs that were recorded by the band after he left.

Fullerton and Bolan continued musical careers. Mike Bolan and Glenn Smith were previously members of The Fabulous Shadows, a band from Coeur d'Alene, Idaho, between 1963 and 1968. Mike Bolan rejoined them later and they have been performing in Idaho on through 2005. Terry Kimble (deceased) was a member of the band Tony Vance and The Progress Hornsby 4 from Spokane, Washington, between 1967 and 1968.

== Discography ==
- High on Mount Rushmore (1968, DOT Records) - DLP 25898; debuted at number 41 on the Billboard national album chart.
- Mount Rushmore '69 (1969, DOT Records) - DLP 25934
- High On / '69 (2002, Lizard) - European CD that combined the two previous albums
