= RAF Gailes =

RAF Gailes
- Fullarton, Ayrshire, in Scotland

Site information
- Type: Royal Air Force station
- Owner: Ministry of Defence
- Controlled by: Royal Air Force

Location
- Shown within North Ayrshire RAF Gailes (the United Kingdom)
- Coordinates: 55.586°N 4.649°W

Site history
- Built: 1950
- In use: 1950-1978
- Battles/wars: Cold War

Royal Air Force Gailes or more simply RAF Gailes is a former Royal Air Force ROTOR radar station in Ayrshire, Scotland.

== History ==
RAF Gailes was built on the site of the earlier RAF Fullarton The buildings from the old GCI station were cleared by December 1950.

The station was short lived, becoming redundant when RAF Killard Point (Northern Ireland) became operational, in September 1956. The Signals Unit at Gailes was disbanded and the station placed on care and maintenance.

In 1962, the station was taken over by civilian staff from Air Traffic Control at Prestwick Airport.

Gailes was finally closed in 1978 and the buildings demolished when the Radar station staff moved to Atlantic House in Prestwick.
