= J. W. C. Fegan =

English Nonconformist evangelist (1852–1925)

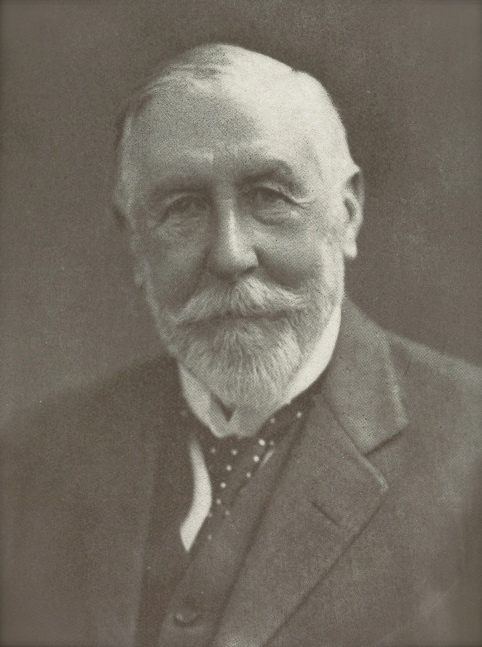
- Born: James William Condell Fegan; 27 April 1852; Southampton, England
- Died: 9 December 1925 (aged 73); Goudhurst, England
- Known for: Founder of orphanages for poor boys

James William Condell Fegan (/ˈfiːɡən/; 27 April 1852 – 9 December 1925) was an English Nonconformist evangelist and the founder of a succession of orphanages for boys.

== Biography ==
Fegan was born and reared in Southampton, where his father was a civil servant at the Ordnance Survey. Both parents were devout Non-Conformists and made the acquaintance of John Nelson Darby, the founder of the Plymouth Brethren. In 1865, the family moved to London, and James entered the City of London School, where Edwin Abbott Abbott, the young headmaster, later provided Fegan with a "glowing testimonial."

In 1869, he entered the office of colonial brokers in Mincing Lane, London; but the following year, he was suddenly converted while sitting alone reading a Greek play. He began distributing Christian tracts, teaching in the evenings at a Ragged School, and preaching at open-air meetings. The strain of working in the brokerage by day and the school by night weakened his health, and he took a vacation to Bognor Regis, where a vagrant boy caught his attention and led him toward his life's work.

On 1 May 1872, with the help of friends, Fegan opened his first boys' home at 112/114 High Street, Deptford, southeast London, and soon gained the title "Fegan of Deptford" for his work with youth in this notorious area. The number of boys soon outgrew that house and then the one next door, and he established The Little Wanderer's Home at Greenwich in 1879, with a country branch in 1881 for boys in poor health. Fegan soon became a friendly rival of the philanthropist Thomas John Barnardo, who established similar institutions in east London. Fegan was so endowed with "prodigious energy" that he was able to enlist even those in his office to help in his after-hours search for "street Arabs."

In 1882, after abandoning his business career, Fegan moved his base of activities to Southwark Street and the following year also established an orphanage at Ramsgate. In 1889, Fegan married Mary Pope, who quickly became her husband's associate, caring for him "with assiduous forethought and sympathy, and in many a tight corner advising him in the work."

During this period, emigration to other parts of the British Empire was encouraged, and in 1884, Fegan took ten boys—and then fifty more—to Canada in 1884. A "distributing home" was given to him in Toronto, and from there annual parties of boys were sent to farms in various parts of the country. The boys were encouraged to repay the cost of their passage and outfits to make the same opportunity available for others, and many of them did so. By 1907, Canadian emigrants had sent more than $11,000 back to England, and their names were inscribed on copper plates at the English orphanages.

After the expiration of the lease on the Greenwich property in 1900, Fegan decided to move the orphanage to the country and in a spirit of "divine recklessness" offered £4,500 for a building at Stony Stratford in Buckinghamshire worth ten times that amount. The mortgage holder readily agreed to sell if payment were made within two weeks, and Fegan duly raised the sum after meeting with his friends for nightly prayer.

In 1913 Fegan vacated the Southwark Street property and opened another building at 62–64 Horseferry Road, which he called "The Red Lamp" because of the light left on at night to signal assistance given to anyone who needed shelter whatever the hour. To prepare boys for emigration to Canada, Fegan also established at Goudhurst in Kent a farm using Canadian farming methods and implements. By the 1920s the farm included a home for Fegan and his wife, which they called Blantyre Lodge after one of their earliest supporters Lord Blantyre.

Fegan died at the Goudhurst farm on 9 December 1925. His wife continued his work until she was killed in an air raid on 7 October 1943.

== Acquaintance with Charles Darwin ==
In 1880, Fegan's parents moved to Downe, a village about fourteen miles from central London, and Fegan spent a great deal of time there with his widowed mother during the summers of 1881–83. Charles Darwin lived nearby, and once when Fegan took his boys camping in the neighborhood, they sang hymns in front of his residence, Down House. Darwin expressed sympathy for Fegan's philanthropic work and (to ringing cheers) gave each of the boys sixpence.

Fegan also held regular tent services in the area, and when he needed a more permanent base of operations, he asked Darwin for the use of a slightly frequented temperance reading room Darwin had established for the villagers. Darwin lent it with pleasure, complimenting Fegan that he had "done more for the village in a few months than all our efforts for many years. We have never been able to reclaim a drunkard, but through your services I do not know that there is a drunkard left in the village."

Late in Fegan's life, after Elizabeth Cotton, Lady Hope had publicized a story about how Darwin had recanted his belief in evolution, Fegan was asked to pronounce on the story's truthfulness, presumably because in the 1880s Hope had worked with him in Downe. In 1925 Fegan wrote that he "had been appealed to over and over again as to the probability of this story, and have had no hesitation in pronouncing it to be fabrication on the part of poor Lady Hope." Darwin, said Fegan, "was an honorable, courteous, benevolent gentleman; but you may be sure that Sir Francis Darwin is right in saying that his father died as he had lived—an agnostic."

== Personality ==
Even a private secretary who greatly admired Fegan called him "autocratic, dictatorial and impatient, for he was a perfectionist and did not suffer fools gladly." Nevertheless, the secretary also credited his employer with considerable human sympathy and a fine sense of humor.

== Bibliography ==
- Fullerton, William Young (1931). J. W. C. Fegan: A Tribute. London: Marshall, Morgan & Scott.
- Tiffin, Alfred (n.d.). Loving and Serving: An Account of the Life and Work of J. W. C. Fegan. London: Deverell, Gibson & Hoare.
- Kohli, Marjorie (2003). The Golden Bridge: Young Immigrants to Canada, 1833–1939. Toronto: Natural Heritage. pp. 164–68.
- Parker, Roy (2008). Uprooted: The Shipment of Poor Children to Canada, 1867–1917. Vancouver: University of British Columbia Press. pp. 79–83.
- Fegans Child and Family Care
- Stony Stratford
- Darwin Correspondence Project
