= Ernest Denny =

English cricketer and British Army officer (1872–1949)

Personal information
- Full name: Ernest Wriothesley Denny
- Born: 5 February 1872; Paddington, Middlesex, England
- Died: 10 October 1949 (aged 77); Garboldisham, Norfolk, England
- Batting: Right-handed
- Bowling: Right-arm fast-medium

Domestic team information
- Years: Team
- 1891: Oxford University

Career statistics
Competition	First-class
Matches	1
Runs scored	1
Batting average	–
100s/50s	–/–
Top score	1*
Balls bowled	10
Wickets	0
Bowling average	–
5 wickets in innings	–
10 wickets in match	–
Best bowling	–
Catches/stumpings	–/–
- Source: Cricinfo, 31 May 2020

Ernest Wriothesley Denny DL DSO (5 February 1872 – 20 October 1949) was an English first-class cricketer and British Army officer.

The son of T. A. Denny, he was born at Paddington in February 1872. He was educated at Wellington College, before going up to New College, Oxford. While studying at Oxford, he made a single appearance in first-class cricket for Oxford University against the Marylebone Cricket Club at Oxford in 1891. Batting twice in the match, Denny was unbeaten without scoring in the Oxford first innings, while in their second innings he was unbeaten having scored a single run. He also bowled two wicketless overs with his right-arm fast-medium bowling.

After graduating from Oxford, Denny attended the Royal Military College, Sandhurst in 1891. He graduated as a second lieutenant in the East Surrey Regiment in January 1892, before transferring to the Middlesex Regiment in March. He was promoted to lieutenant in June 1896 and later served during the Second Boer War with the 13th Hussars, during which he was promoted to captain in October 1901. He was promoted to major in October 1906, before retiring from active service in July 1910. Denny returned to active service during the First World War, during which he was awarded the Distinguished Service Order for conspicuous gallantry and devotion to duty in September 1918. Denny later served as a deputy lieutenant for Norfolk in 1936. He died in October 1949 at Garboldisham, Norfolk.
