= Boniface Adoyo =

Kenyan bishop

Bishop Boniface Enos Adoyo is a Kenyan retired bishop and former head of the Evangelical Alliance of Kenya.

Adoyo reports that he holds a Master of Divinity degree and also studied economics at the London School of Economics. He is a former overseer in Christ in the Answer Ministries (CITAM), a congregation in Nairobi, and a former Chancellor of Pan African Christian University.

His oversight saw the Church grow and expand to the current CITAM Ministries that comprises Assemblies, Hope Fm Radio Station, Hope TV, a Children's Centre, Kindergarten, Primary and Secondary Schools and a Catering Unit.

Adoyo served in various leadership capacities including as Ombudsman – Jomo Kenyatta University of Agriculture and Technology, Council Member of Daystar University, Chairperson Pentecostal Assemblies of Africa (PAOA). He also chaired the Finish The Task Missions Training Agency, and was the Executive Committee Member of Globworks and Globserve.

Adoyo has caused controversy through his crusade against evolution. He has argued that macroevolution is an unproven theory which should not be taught to children as fact. The Associated Press reported that Adoyo was mobilizing Kenyan Christians to boycott the Nairobi Museum which houses the Turkana boy fossils. In a campaign christened "hide the bones," Kenyan evangelicals demanded the removal of Turkana boy from display. He has since held media debates with Kenya's renowned palaeontologist Richard Leakey over the subject.

Adoyo was criticized in 2007 for repeating the false story that on his death bed, Charles Darwin "expressed surprise that people believed his theory." This claim, first made by Elizabeth Hope, is regarded as false by Darwin's family, modern historians, and even the creationist group Answers in Genesis.

After his retirement, Adoyo joined politics and vied for Nairobi Senatorial seat in the 2013 general elections. He was sponsored by the LPK Party and came a distant fourth behind winner Mike Sonko, Margaret Wanjiru of ODM and businessman Stanley Livondo.
