= Fullarton (disambiguation) =

Fullarton is an area in Irvine, North Ayrshire, Scotland.

Fullarton may also refer to:

== Places ==
- Fullarton Township, Ontario, Canada
- Fullarton, South Australia
- Crosbie Castle and the Fullarton estate, South Ayrshire, Scotland
- Fullarton, a neighbourhood in Tollcross, Glasgow, Scotland
  - Fullarton Park, football ground, home to Vale of Clyde F.C.

== Surname ==
- Jamie Fullarton (born 1974), Scottish professional football player and manager
- John Fullarton (c.1645–1727), Scottish clergyman and nonjurant Episcopal Bishop of Edinburgh
- John Fullarton (writer) (c. 1780–1849), Scottish traveller and writer
- Nan Fullarton (1913–2000), Australian artist, writer and ballet costume designer
- Tom Fullarton (born 1999), Australian professional basketball and football player
- William Fullarton (footballer) (1882–?), Scottish football player
- William Fullarton (priest) (died 1655), Archdeacon of Armagh

== Other uses ==
- Archibald Fullarton and Co., a publisher in Glasgow in the 1800s
- The Fullarton, a theatre in Castle Douglas, Dumfries and Galloway, Scotland
- RAF Fullarton, a former Royal Air Force Ground Control Intercept station, Ayrshire, Scotland

== See also ==
- Fullerton (disambiguation)
