= Elizabeth, Lady Hope =

British activist

Elizabeth Hope
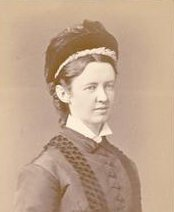
- Born: Elizabeth Reid Cotton; 9 December 1842; Tasmania, Australia
- Died: 8 March 1922 (aged 79); Sydney, Australia
- Other names: Lady Hope, Elizabeth Denny
- Occupation: Evangelist
- Known for: Temperance movement
- Spouse(s): Admiral James Hope; Thomas A. Denny

Elizabeth Reid Cotton, (Note: Her maiden name is sometimes incorrectly given as Stapleton-Cotton, an error that first appeared in Burke's Peerage; the Stapleton-Cotton name later branched from the Cotton lineage.) (9 December 1842 – 8 March 1922) who became Lady Hope when she married Sir James Hope in 1877, was a British evangelist active in the Temperance movement.

In 1915, she claimed to have visited the British naturalist Charles Darwin shortly before his death in 1882. Hope said that Darwin spoke of second thoughts about publicizing his theory of natural selection. The possibility that Hope visited Darwin cannot be excluded, although it is denied by Darwin's family, but what she claimed Darwin said at the putative interview is much less likely to be accurate.

== Early life and ministry ==
Elizabeth Cotton was born on 9 December 1842 in Tasmania, Australia. She was the daughter of British irrigation engineer, General Sir Arthur Cotton, and spent her childhood in Madras, India, while her father supervised water management and canal projects in Andhra Pradesh. (Note: According to L. R. Croft, Arthur Cotton is the only Englishman to have had statues erected in India to his memory since Independence. Lady Hope's mother was Elizabeth Learmonth, daughter of Thomas Learmonth, an Australian landowner of Ercildoun who traced his ancestry to Thomas-the-Rhymer.) Returning to England after her father's retirement in 1861, the family resided in Hadley Green and came under the influence of the Rev. William Pennefather, an evangelical Anglican clergyman. Cotton also met many contemporary evangelicals during a three-year stay in Ireland.

In 1869, the family settled in Dorking, Surrey, about 30 miles from Downe, home of Charles Darwin—where Elizabeth began evangelistic and philanthropic work, first organising a Sunday school and then a "Coffee-Room" where food and non-alcoholic drinks were served. (Note: Cotton advocated total abstinence from alcohol. In 2017, a national newspaper article called her one of Scotland's "greatest social reformers.") (Florence Nightingale distributed copies of Cotton's book Our Coffee-Room and established her own coffee room in her village of Whatstandwell in Derbyshire.) Cotton held Bible classes and prayer meetings in the hall, and spoke at a Sunday evening service. A contemporary reported that she had "a pleasing, engaging manner and silvery voice, and her message was simple." In 1874–75, Cotton assisted in the evangelistic meetings held by American evangelists Dwight L. Moody and Ira Sankey, counselling women converts.

In 1877, at the age of 35, Cotton married a widower, retired Admiral Sir James Hope, an evangelical and a temperance advocate who was 34 years her senior. Cotton therefore became Lady Hope of Carriden. Sir James died four years later.

Thereafter Lady Hope opened several additional coffee houses and settled in London where she became involved in the work of the Golden Bells Mission in Notting Hill Gate. (Note: The Golden Bells Coffee Palace is now the Notting Hill Gate Cinema.) She was a prolific author of more than thirty books that "dealt with evangelistic and temperance themes," many containing "personal anecdotes reminiscent of the Darwin story."

In 1893, she married T. A. Denny, an evangelical Irish businessman, 24 years her senior—though she continued to use the name "Lady Hope." She and Denny opened hostels for working men and provided accommodation for soldiers returned from the Boer War. She published a biography of her father after he died in 1899. In 1903, she opened her largest temperance hostel, the Connaught Club in Marble Arch, which offered accommodation for several hundred men. (Note: The building, now the Victory Services Club, remains in 2016 much as she planned it.) Cotton also patented a headband, which she called the "Hope Bandeau", designed to secure a women's hat without the use of a hatpin. After Denny died in 1909, Hope befriended an ex-convict, and after she entrusted her finances to him, he betrayed her trust. In 1911 she was declared bankrupt.

In 1913, she came to the United States as a delegate to a convention of the World's Woman's Christian Temperance Union being held in Brooklyn, and afterwards she decided to remain in the United States. On 4 August 1915, 33 years after Darwin's death and shortly after she was diagnosed with breast cancer, Hope led a devotional service at a Bible conference in Northfield, Massachusetts, where she apparently first told her story about meeting Darwin.

== Lady Hope's story of her meeting with Charles Darwin ==
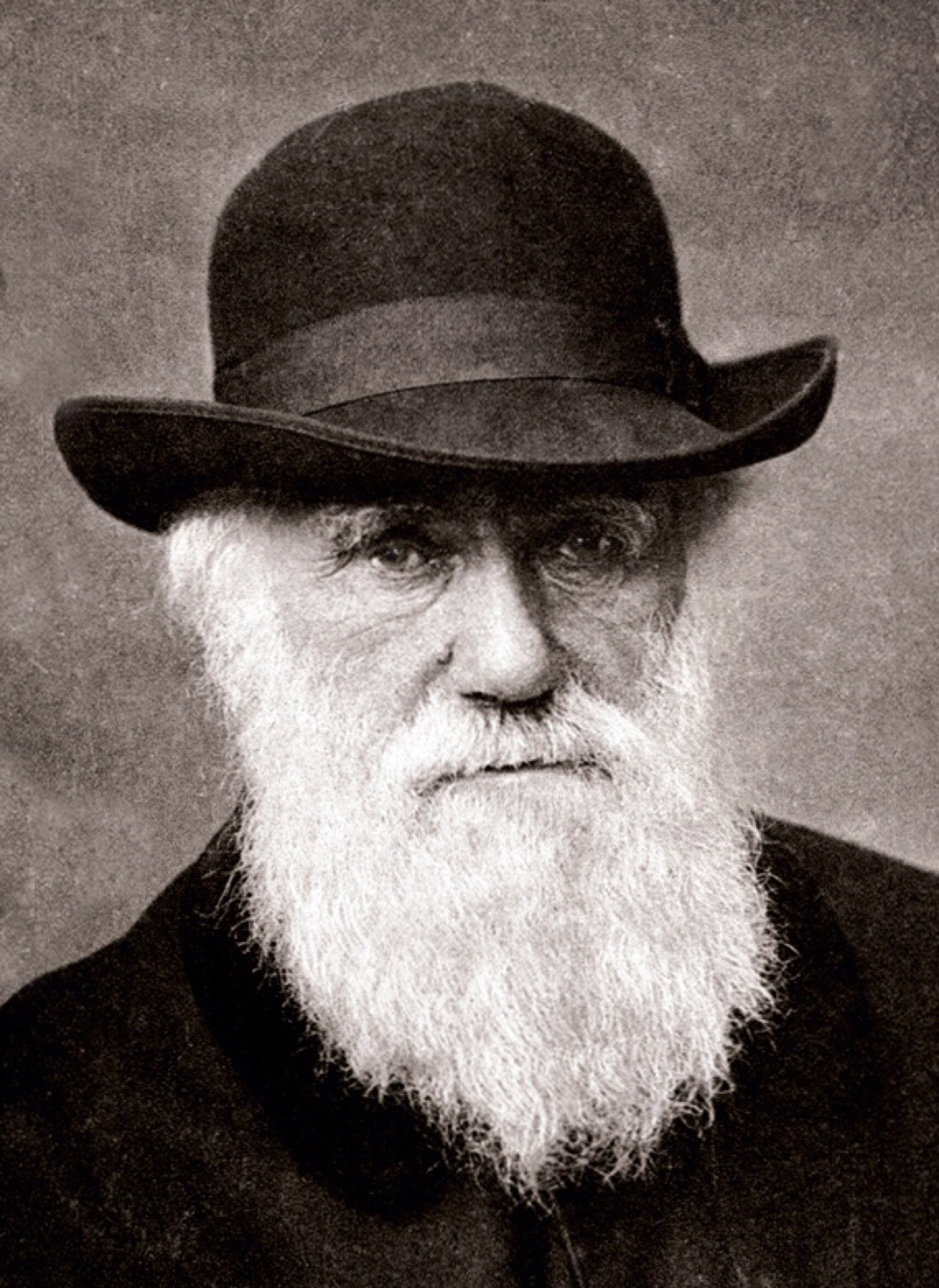
Charles Darwin in 1881, the year before his death.

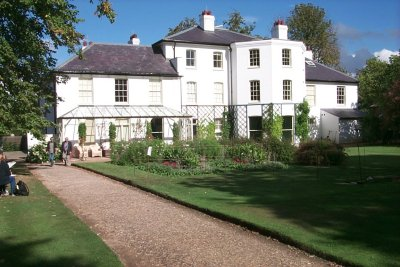
Down House in Kent, Darwin's home, where Hope claimed she met Darwin.

Lady Hope's story first appeared in an American Baptist newspaper, the Watchman-Examiner, on 15 August 1915, the story preceded by a four-page report on the summer Bible conference held in Northfield, which that year ran from 30 July to 15 August 1915:

=== Original text ===
It was one of those glorious autumn afternoons, that we sometimes enjoy in England, when I was asked to go in and sit with the well known professor, Charles Darwin. He was almost bedridden for some months before he died. I used to feel when I saw him that his fine presence would make a grand picture for our Royal Academy; but never did I think so more strongly than on this particular occasion.

He was sitting up in bed, wearing a soft embroidered dressing gown, of rather a rich purple shade.

Propped up by pillows, he was gazing out on a far-stretching scene of woods and cornfields, which glowed in the light of one of those marvellous sunsets which are the beauty of Kent and Surrey. His noble forehead and fine features seem to be lit up with pleasure as I entered the room.

He waved his hand toward the window as he pointed out the scene beyond, while in the other hand he held an open Bible, which he was always studying.

"What are you reading now?" I asked as I seated myself beside his bedside. "Hebrews!" he answered – "still Hebrews. 'The Royal Book' I call it. Isn't it grand?"

Then, placing his finger on certain passages, he commented on them.

I made some allusions to the strong opinions expressed by many persons on the history of the creation, its grandeur, and then their treatment of the earlier chapters of the Book of Genesis.

He seemed greatly distressed, his fingers twitched nervously, and a look of agony came over his face as he said: "I was a young man with unformed ideas. I threw out queries, suggestions, wondering all the time over everything, and to my astonishment, the ideas took like wildfire. People made a religion of them."

Then he paused, and after a few more sentences on "the holiness of God" and the "grandeur of this book," looking at the Bible which he was holding tenderly all the time, he suddenly said: "I have a summer house in the garden which holds about thirty people. It is over there," pointing through the open window. "I want you very much to speak there. I know you read the Bible in the villages. To-morrow afternoon I should like the servants on the place, some tenants and a few of the neighbours; to gather there. Will you speak to them?"

"What shall I speak about?" I asked.

"Christ Jesus!" he replied in a clear, emphatic voice, adding in a lower tone, "and his salvation. Is not that the best theme? And then I want you to sing some hymns with them. You lead on your small instrument, do you not?" The wonderful look of brightness and animation on his face as he said this I shall never forget, for he added: "If you take the meeting at three o'clock this window will be open, and you will know that I am joining in with the singing."

How I wished I could have made a picture of the fine old man and his beautiful surroundings on that memorable day!

=== Rebuttal by Darwin's children and others ===
On 2 November 1915, Rev. A.T. Robertson, who had given a lecture at the Northfield Conference on the same day as Lady Hope, received a letter about her story from an acquaintance in Toronto who claimed to have known her back in London and had little confidence in "her judgement or her imagination".

Everyone in Darwin's family denied the validity of the story. In 1917, Darwin's son Francis wrote that "Lady Hope's account of my father's views on religion is quite untrue. I have publicly accused her of falsehood, but have not seen any reply. My father's agnostic point of view is given in my Life and Letters of Charles Darwin, Vol. I., pp. 304–317. You are at liberty to publish the above statement. Indeed, I shall be glad if you will do so." In 1922, Darwin's daughter, Henrietta Litchfield, said she did not believe Lady Hope had ever seen her father and that "he never recanted any of his scientific views, either then or earlier. We think the story of his conversion was fabricated in the U.S.A." Leonard, Darwin's last surviving child, dismissed Lady Hope's account as a "hallucination" (1930) and "purely fictitious" (1934).

=== Subsequent retellings and investigations ===
Lady Hope gave the fullest account of her story in a letter written (circa 1919–20) to S. James Bole, who first published it in 1940. (Note: The letter text is reprinted.) The story became a popular legend, and Hope's claims were republished as late as October 1955 in the Reformation Review and in the Monthly Record of the Free Church of Scotland in February 1957.

In 1925, J. W. C. Fegan, an evangelist and sometime associate of Lady Hope, commented on her character to one S. J. Pratt, who was investigating the story. Fegan said that although Darwin had certainly been an agnostic, he was also "an honourable, courteous, benevolent gentleman." In contrast, Fegan noted that after Hope had been "adjudicated bankrupt," she had asked him for "a commendatory letter to take with her to America, and it was my painful duty to tell her that I did not feel I could do so." (Note: L. R. Croft has disputed the reliability of this letter on the grounds that as a member of the English aristocracy, Lady Hope would have had little need for a commendatory letter from Fegan.)

In 1994, Open University lecturer and biographer James Moore published The Darwin Legend, in which he suggested that Hope had visited Darwin sometime between 28 September and 2 October 1881, when Francis and Henrietta were absent and Charles' wife Emma was present, but that Hope had subsequently embellished the story. (Note: Moore repeated this assessment in 2005. Marston provided a different analysis but generally supports the same conclusion, drawing attention to discrepancies between the 1915 article and Lady Hope's later letter, which more plausibly has Darwin lying on a sofa rather than being in bed and does not include the suggestion that Darwin was "always studying" the Bible.) Moore argued that the Lady Hope story bore "all the hallmarks of Lady Hope's anecdotal imagination. Years of tract and novel writing had made her a skilled raconteur, able to summon up poignant scenes and conversations, and embroider them with sentimental spirituality. The distinction between fact and fancy in her writings was never well defined. In her dotage now, she was even less likely to be hard-headed about history. Disgraced in England, displaced in America, she had only a short time before her cancer proved fatal. With everything to gain, what better than to trade off her title, ingratiate herself with 'impressionable' Americans, and launch an edifying myth?"

The Lady Hope story has been promoted by a few modern creationists, including Kenyan Boniface Adoyo, but one of the most influential creationist organisations, Answers in Genesis, has disputed the legend.

== Death ==
When, in 1920, Lady Hope's illness had progressed to the extent she could no longer continue her ministry, she settled in Los Angeles and took up painting. She later travelled to Sydney, Australia, for medical treatment and died there on 9 March 1922.
