= T. A. Denny =

- Born: Thomas Anthony Denny; 2 April 1818
- Died: 25 December 1909 (aged 91)
- Occupations: Merchant; Philanthropist
- Spouse(s): Mary Jane Noel (m. 1868; died 1887) Elizabeth Hope (m. 1893)

Thomas Anthony "T. A." Denny (2 April 1818 – 25 December 1909) was an Irish bacon merchant, a self-described "pork philanthropist". Although not a member of the Salvation Army, he supported it financially. His philanthropic activities also included support for education. In April 1868, he married Mary Jane Noel (1829-1887), daughter of Baptist Wriothesley Noel. In 1893, he married the evangelist Elizabeth Hope, who was 24 years his junior. His son was the first-class cricketer and British Army officer Ernest Denny.

== Salvation Army ==
Denny was one of a small group of wealthy benefactors who sustained the Salvation Army in its early years. He attended meetings called in 1877 by Samuel Morley, another benefactor, to discuss differences with William Booth, after which he continued to provide financial support despite continuing to disagree with Booth about doctrine and methods. His support included, in 1881, paying the first year's rent on the organisation's headquarters at 101 Queen Victoria Street in London and supporting the establishment of the Army in France. In 1882 he contributed to the repayment of debts incurred for the building of barracks.

== Educational philanthropy ==
In 1890 Denny provided most of the funding for the buildings occupied by Woolwich Polytechnic and served as chairman of its board from 1891 to 1894.

== Arms ==
Coat of arms of T. A. Denny
Notes Granted 30 April 1870 by Sir John Bernard Burke, Ulster King of Arms. Crest Out of a mural crown Proper a cubit arm vested Azure cuff Argent the hand also Proper holding five wheat ears Or. Escutcheon Gules a saltire between nine crosses pattee three in chief and a like number on each side Argent in base a lion passant guardant Or. Motto Et Mea Messis Erit
