= Travis Fullerton =

American drummer

Travis Fullerton is a rock musician, playing drums for various California bands and sessions.

In San Francisco, California Fullerton played with Sam the Sham in 1966, Quicksilver (briefly), and Mount Rushmore, 1967-1969. In 1970 he moved to Hollywood. He was part of the group The Hot Band in 1973 that backed Sylvester and recorded two albums. He has played drums for Rita Coolidge, Graham Nash, Stephen Stills, Martha Reeves, Billy Joel, and Roxy. He also added some background vocals on Lee Oskar's Before the Rain album in 1978.

From 1967 to 1980 he toured or recorded with Stephen Stills, Martha Reeves, John Lennon, Mount Rushmore, Quicksilver, Bonnie Raitt, Sylvester, Billy Joel, Lee Oskar, Rita Coolidge, Graham Nash, Roy Buchanan, and many others and played on about 30 albums. He was signed to major labels including Atlantic, Blue Thumb, Columbia, Paramount, MCA etc.

In the early 1980s his interest in digital music, a computer science degree, and his connection in Los Angeles with Alan Kay, then on the board of directors of Apple Computer, led him to a job there in the "special music projects group." From there he moved to the Macintosh group. Since that time he has worked for Packard Bell and Microsoft.

Fullerton was married to Sandi Fullerton, a director of Don Kirshner's Rock Concert TV series and The Arsenio Hall Show.
