= Fantasy Premier League =

Fantasy football game

Fantasy Premier League (FPL) is the official free-to-play fantasy football game of the English Premier League. With over 13 million players, it is the largest fantasy football game of any domestic football league.

== History ==
Fantasy Football League, based on the Premier League, started in the UK in the early 1990s. By 1994, The Daily Telegraph's version was the clear leader. Its popularity grew rapidly, helped by the television comedy spin-off Fantasy Football League featuring Frank Skinner and David Baddiel, which also started in 1994.

Created by ISM Fantasy Games and owned and operated by the Premier League, Fantasy Premier League was introduced ahead of the 2002–03 Premier League season. It was launched in conjunction with the creation of the Premier League website.

In its first season, it had 76,200 players, with first place winning a VIP trip to a Premier League match of their choice. The player base has grown annually, with the exception of the 2012–13 and 2023–24 seasons, surpassing one million players for the first time during the 2006–07 season and over 10 million entries for the first time during the 2022–23 campaign.

== Gameplay ==
=== Classic ===
The classic Fantasy Premier League game is open to the public and is contested annually by millions worldwide. Participants must select a team based on the real-life Premier League footballers who score fantasy points based on those players' statistical performances. Points accumulate across the season in order to declare a champion. In addition to the overall global leaderboard, there are smaller automatic public leaderboards categorized by home country and Premier League club supported.

- Team selection: Participants select a squad of 15 players from the Premier League within an allocated £100m budget. A maximum of three players can be selected per club. Starting XIs must contain one goalkeeper and a minimum of three defenders.
- Team management: Managers are permitted to make one free transfer per gameweek, with the opportunity to roll over unused transfers (up to five) on a weekly basis for a maximum of five. Additional transfers can be made for a -4 point deduction per transfer. Users also select a captain, whose score is doubled for the round, and a vice-captain, who becomes captain automatically should the chosen captain not play. Changes must be made before the gameweek deadline. Substitutes are automatically activated if a starting player does not play, following the manager's chosen bench order and within valid formation constraints.
- Points scoring: Points are awarded based on real-life player performance, with actions such as goals, assists and clean sheets earning points, while points are deducted for bookings and conceding goals. A bonus points system also rewards players for underlying stats, with the top three scoring players in metrics such as pass completion and tackles earning bonus points. Since 2012, Opta has been the data provider for FPL. The game runs across the length of the entire Premier League season, and the overall winner is the manager who has accumulated the most points at the conclusion of the season.
- Chips: Since 2015, managers have been equipped with several chips to use throughout the season. They must be activated prior to the gameweek deadline. Chips can be used once in the first half of the season, and again in the second half of the season. They do not carry over. Chips include:
  - Wildcard – unlimited permanent transfers at no cost.
  - Triple captain – selected captain's points are tripled instead of doubled.
  - Bench boost – points from a manager's substitutes are added to the total.
  - Free hit – unlimited transfers at no cost for a single gameweek. The previous gameweek's team will be restored at the end of the round.
  - Assistant Manager (discontinued in 2025–26 season) – ahead of the 2024–25 season, FPL announced a new "mystery chip" available to play in January 2025. This was revealed to be the Assistant Manager chip. When selected, it becomes active for three gameweeks, and the FPL manager selects a Premier League manager to contribute points to their team depending on the Premier League manager's performance.
  - All out attack (discontinued in 2017) – enabled managers to play a 2–5–3 formation, i.e., start an extra attacker at the expense of a defender.
- Transfer limits update (2024–25): Ahead of the 2024–25 season, the FPL increased the number of free transfers a manager can carry over from one to four, allowing for a maximum of five in a single gameweek.
- Defensive Contributions: FPL introduced Defensive Contribution (DEFCON) points ahead of the 2025–26 season, where FPL managers will get an additional 2 points should the players they select hit the DEFCON threshold (Defenders: 10, Midfielders & Forwards: 12)
- Mini-leagues: Users can create private mini-leagues and invite friends or other players to join. Scoring is available in two formats: the standard total-points format or a head-to-head league, whereby teams face off against one another each gameweek, earning three points for a win or one for a tie.
- FPL Cup: A knockout cup competition runs concurrently during the season. Managers are randomly drawn against an opponent and face off in a head-to-head match using their regular FPL team, with only the winner proceeding to the next round.
- Ownership trends: Real-time data on the most owned players by FPL managers is available through external tools.

=== Draft ===
As well as the standard format, FPL introduced a draft mode for the first time in 2017. In this instance, managers join small private leagues of between 2–16 managers. There is no budget and instead managers take turns to select players for their 15-man squads. However, once a player has been selected, they are not available for any other managers in that specific private league to select.

=== Challenge ===
In March 2024, FPL launched a beta version of a new DFS game called FPL Challenge. The mode is separate from the main game and requires players to build a squad for one single gameweek with a particular challenge unique to that gameweek also active (e.g., unlimited budget, players in certain positions or for certain clubs score double). Unlike the classic and draft modes, the game is a short-form "daily" game with scores resetting back to zero after each round. This means there were no cumulative season-long leaderboards and prizes are awarded to the top three scoring managers for each individual round. However, ahead of the first full 2024–25 season, FPL added a season-long leaderboard and the ability to create mini-leagues. Events were also introduced. An event is a short collection of four or five gameweeks with a broader theme (e.g., five-a-side teams rather than the classic XI). Managers are able to track their mini-league standings during events as well as single gameweeks and season-long points.

== Winners ==
List of Fantasy Premier League champions
| Season | Players | Winner | Nationality | Team name | Points | Ref. |
|---|---|---|---|---|---|---|
| 2002–03 | 76k | Graeme Haddow | South Africa | Wee Wullie Winkie FC | 1,940 (Note: Points did not start accumulating in the first FPL season until gameweek 7 with the first six weeks considered preseason, allowing players to familiarise themselves with the game.) | |
| 2003–04 | 312k | Muir O'Connor | Ireland | The Lonely 11 | 2,151 | |
| 2004–05 | 472k | Andy Tomlins | England | Palace Excile | 2,253 | |
| 2005–06 | 810k | Tommy Wilson | | Blue Bridge Brigade | 2,326 | |
| 2006–07 | 1.27m | Mike Dolan | | Divers & Cheats XI | 2,268 | |
| 2007–08 | 1.70m | John Frisina | Australia | FRISK UTD | 2,466 | |
| 2008–09 | 1.95m | Sir Moult | Australia | MOULTANIC | 2,264 | |
| 2009–10 | 2.10m | Jon Reeson | England | Westfield Irons | 2,668 | |
| 2010–11 | 2.35m | Chris McGurn | England | Morons FC | 2,372 | |
| 2011–12 | 2.78m | Sam Pater | England | SamCity | 2,414 | |
| 2012–13 | 2.61m | Matt Martyniak | England | Divine Mercy | 2,472 | |
| 2013–14 | 3.22m | Tom Fenley | England | Captain Suarez! | 2,634 | |
| 2014–15 | 3.5m | Simon March | England | Atletico Marchid** | 2,470 | |
| 2015–16 | 3.73m | Dimitri Nicolaou | England | Dimitris gavles | 2,458 | |
| 2016–17 | 4.50m | Ben Crabtree | England | FC Crab Dogg | 2,564 | |
| 2017–18 | 5.19m | Yusuf Sheikh | Tanzania | Yusuf's Team | 2,512 | |
| 2018–19 | 6.32m | Adam Levy | New Zealand | #TheyAreUs | 2,659 | |
| 2019–20 | 7.63m | Joshua Bull (Note: Aleksander Antonov finished on 2,575 points but was disqualified two weeks later by FPL "due to a breach of our terms.") | England | The Bulldozers | 2,557 | |
| 2020–21 | 8.15m | Michael Coone | Ireland | Teddy Bears Utd | 2,680 | |
| 2021–22 | 9.17m | Jamie Pigott | United States | Futbol Is Life | 2,844 | |
| 2022–23 | 11.45m | Ali Jahangirov | Azerbaijan | FPL Gunz | 2,776 | |
| 2023–24 | 10.91m | Jonas Sand Låbakk | Norway | Onkel Blaa | 2,799 | |
| 2024–25 | 11.50m | Lovro Budišin | Croatia | Aina Krafth Bree* | 2,810 | |
| 2025–26 | 13.10m | Erik Ibsen | Denmark | Ibsen | 2,582 | |

List of Fantasy Premier League Challenge champions
| Season | Players | Winner | Nationality | Team name | Points | Ref. |
|---|---|---|---|---|---|---|
| 2024–25 | 2.20m | Md Zawad Amin As-Salek | Bangladesh | FPLlenge Zawad | 2,377 | |
| 2025–26 | 4.78m | Elias Enback | Sweden | FC Bussen | 2,420 | |

== Highest scoring players ==
Below is a list of players who have finished a season as the highest-scoring Fantasy Premier League player.

Number of multiple wins shown in brackets.

Highest scoring players per season
| Season | Player | Position | Starting price | Club | Points | Ref. |
|---|---|---|---|---|---|---|
| 2002–03 | Thierry Henry | Forward | £11.0m | Arsenal | 271 | |
| 2003–04 | Thierry Henry (2) | Forward | | Arsenal | 242 | |
| 2004–05 | Frank Lampard | Midfielder | £10.0m | Chelsea | 269 | |
| 2005–06 | Thierry Henry (3) | Forward | £14.0m | Arsenal | 239 | |
| 2006–07 | Cristiano Ronaldo | Midfielder | £10.0m | Manchester United | 244 | |
| 2007–08 | Cristiano Ronaldo (2) | Midfielder | £12.0m | Manchester United | 283 | |
| 2008–09 | Frank Lampard (2) | Midfielder | £11.0m | Chelsea | 226 | |
| 2009–10 | Frank Lampard (3) | Midfielder | | Chelsea | 284 | |
| 2010–11 | Luis Nani | Midfielder | £8.0m | Manchester United | 198 | |
| 2011–12 | Robin van Persie | Forward | £12.0m | Arsenal | 269 | |
| 2012–13 | Robin van Persie (2) | Forward | £13.0m | Manchester United | 262 | |
| 2013–14 | Luis Suárez | Forward | £11.0m | Liverpool | 295 | |
| 2014–15 | Eden Hazard | Midfielder | £10.0m | Chelsea | 233 | |
| 2015–16 | Riyad Mahrez | Midfielder | £5.5m | Leicester City | 240 | |
| 2016–17 | Alexis Sánchez | Midfielder | £11.0m | Arsenal | 264 | |
| 2017–18 | Mohamed Salah | Midfielder | £9.0m | Liverpool | 303 | |
| 2018–19 | Mohamed Salah (2) | Midfielder | £13.0m | Liverpool | 259 | |
| 2019–20 | Kevin De Bruyne | Midfielder | £9.5m | Manchester City | 251 | |
| 2020–21 | Bruno Fernandes | Midfielder | £10.5m | Manchester United | 244 | |
| 2021–22 | Mohamed Salah (3) | Midfielder | £12.5m | Liverpool | 265 | |
| 2022–23 | Erling Haaland | Forward | £11.5m | Manchester City | 272 | |
| 2023–24 | Cole Palmer | Midfielder | £5.0m | Chelsea | 244 | |
| 2024–25 | Mohamed Salah (4) | Midfielder | £12.5m | Liverpool | 344 | |
| 2025–26 | Erling Haaland (2) | Forward | £14.0m | Manchester City | 239 | |

== Other games ==
As well as the Premier League's own official game, there are numerous other fantasy football games based on Premier League play, some of which predate FPL. Media outlets such as The Daily Telegraph and Sky Sports offer cash prizes for winning their own variations of the classic format. Draft Fantasy Football is an independent platform that offers both snake and auction draft games. FanTeam is a gambling site that offers daily games as well as a pay-to-enter season-long game. Sorare is a cryptocurrency-based game where users create teams by collecting and trading player cards and NFTs. The company signed an official four-year licensing deal with the Premier League in January 2023.
