= John Fullerton =

John Fullerton may refer to:

- John Fullerton, Lord Fullerton (1775–1853), Scottish judge
- Sir John Fullerton (Royal Navy officer) (1840–1918), British Royal Navy officer and courtier
- John Fullerton (politician) (1912–1965), politician in Ontario, Canada
- John B. Fullerton, American financier
