= Michael Fullerton =

Scottish artist (born 1971)

Michael Fullerton (born 1971) is a Scottish artist living and working in London. He is primarily a portraitist and paints in a traditional style.

== Life and work ==
Fullerton was born in Bellshill, Scotland). He attended the Glasgow School of Art and graduated from the MA painting programme in 2002.

Michael Fullerton trained as a painter. His work includes painting, printmaking and sculpture. He works with portraiture, referencing the 18th century portraitist, Thomas Gainsborough, and combining aesthetic with political concerns, his mode described by Roberta Smith of the New York Times, as "a well-trained if so far unoriginal way with paint."

He has painted Lady Cosgrove, seen as a feminist pioneer for being the first female judge in Scotland, in a work titled Lover, which refers to the artist's love of oil painting, as well as of the "romance" of political action. Another portrait was of Paddy Joe Hill, one of the Birmingham Six, exonerated sixteen years after wrongful conviction for the IRA bombing of pubs in Birmingham. Initially Hill had approached Fullerton to buy Lover for the offices of the organisation he had founded, MOJO UK (the Miscarriages of Justice Organisation). Fullerton felt it was not an appropriate location for the work, and painted a full-length portrait of Hill instead.

In 2005, his work was shown at Tate Britain in a solo show in the Art Now series, and The Centre for Contemporary Arts, Glasgow in the solo show Suck on Science. His solo show Are You Hung Up? was shown at the Transmission Gallery, Scotland as well as Counter Gallery, London in 2003. His show entitled Get Over Yourself was shown at Greene Naftali, New York City, in December 2006. He was included in Tate Triennial 2006, a three-yearly survey of new art. His most recent solo show was "Columbia", which was shown at the Chisenhale Gallery, London between 9 September and 24 October 2010.

== Solo shows ==
- 2001 Art in the Square Glasgow
- 2002 Tramway Glasgow
- 2002 Andrew Mummery Gallery London
- 2002 Jenny Saville/Glen Luchford: Closed Contact, Gagosian Gallery, Beverly Hills.
- 2003 Are You Hung Up?, Transmission Gallery, Glasgow
- 2003 Generator Projects, Dundee
- 2005 Suck on Science, CCA, Glasgow
- 2005 Art Now, Tate Britain, London
- 2010 Columbia, Chisenhale, London
