= RAF Fullarton =

RAF Fullarton
- Fullarton, Ayrshire, in Scotland

Site information
- Type: Royal Air Force station
- Owner: Air Ministry
- Controlled by: Royal Air Force

Location
- Shown within North Ayrshire RAF Fullarton (the United Kingdom)
- Coordinates: 55.586°N 4.649°W

Site history
- Built: 1940
- In use: 1940-1950
- Battles/wars: European theatre of World War II

Royal Air Force Fullarton or more simply RAF Fullarton is a former Royal Air Force Ground Control Intercept station, situated in Ayrshire, Scotland.

== History ==
RAF Fullarton was established during the Second World War and initially consisted of mobile vans, but was later upgraded to a stage 2 station with operations blocks made out of brick. The station was never fully updated and remained an intermediate station. The station closed at the end of the war and was placed on care and maintenance until the early 1950s when the site was selected for the ROTOR programme, as RAF Gailes.
