= William Young Fullerton =

Irish evangelist and hymn writer

William Young Fullerton (8 March 1857 – 17 August 1932) was a Baptist evangelist, administrator and writer. He was born in Belfast, Ireland. As a young man, he was influenced by the preaching of Charles Spurgeon, who became his friend and mentor. Fullerton served as President of the Baptist Union and Home Secretary of the Baptist Missionary Society. He was a frequent speaker at Keswick Conventions. His published works include biographies of John Bunyan, Charles Spurgeon, James William Condell Fegan and Frederick Brotherton Meyer; missionary histories and devotional writings. He also compiled several hymnals. He is remembered for his hymn entitled "I Cannot tell why He, whom angels worship", which he set to the traditional Irish melody "Londonderry Air". He died at Bedford Park, Middlesex, at the age of 75.

== Selected works ==
- At the sixtieth milestone: incidents of the journey (1917)
- Charles Haddon Spurgeon: the prince of preachers (1934)
- C.H. Spurgeon: a biography (1920)
- Christ and men: Studies in the human side of the Christian life (1900)
- The Christ of the Congo River (1928)
- The Christly life: a study of the Christian graces and how to attain them (1930)
- Frederick Brotherton Meyer: a biography (1929)
- Fronded palms: a collection of pointed papers on a wide range of subjects (1884)
- God's high way: old ideals and new impulses (1919)
- J. W. C. Fegan: a tribute (1931?)
- John Bunyan (1932)
- The legacy of Bunyan (1928)
- Life's dusty way: old failures and new ideals (1918)
- New China: a story of modern travel, with C.E. Wilson (1910) New China : A story of modern travel (digitized by University of Hong Kong Libraries, Digital Initiatives, "China Through Western Eyes.")
- Souls of men: studies in the problems of the church of today (1927)
- The practice of Christ's presence (1919)
- The romance of Picairn Island (1923?)
- Thomas Spurgeon: A Biography (1919)
