= William Fullarton (priest) =

Irish Anglican cleric

William Fullarton was Archdeacon of Armagh from 1633 until 1655.

Fullarton was ordained in 1628. He was a Prebendary of Carncastle in the Diocese of Connor he held livings at Termonfeckin, Derrykeighan, and Ahoghill.

He married Jeane, daughter of Bishop Robert Echlin: they had 9 children (Robert, William, John, Jeane, Margaret, Euphiam, Isobel, Mary, and Agnes).
