= Fullerton Public Library =

Public library system in California, USA

The Fullerton Public Library
- 33°52′15″N 117°55′50″W
- Location: Fullerton, California
- Established: 1906
- Branches: 1

Collection
- Size: 205,328 (2015-2016)

Access and use
- Circulation: 729,224 (2015-2016)
- Population served: 142,457 (2015-2016)
- Members: 109,779 (2015-2016)

Other information
- Budget: $4,045,348 (2015-2016)
- Director: Judy Booth (acting)
- Employees: 66
- Website: www.fullertonlibrary.org

Fullerton Public Library, main entrance

The Fullerton Public Library (FPL), is a public library system that serves the City of Fullerton, California and its surrounding communities.

The Library holds more than 200,000 volumes and serves a population of ca. 142,000. FPL is overseen by a Library Board of trustees with five members appointed by the City Council.

== Timeline ==
1888 The Gem Pharmacy, owned by William J. Starbuck, ran a "traveling library" supported by private donations. Books could be checked out free of charge.

1902 Mrs. James Dean opened a "free reading room" on the NW corner of Commonwealth Avenue and Spadra (now called Harbor Boulevard). It was intended to fill the idle hours of oil field and migrant workers.

1906 The City Fathers established a free public library under Ordinance No. 46 two years after the City incorporated. Population 2,000.

1907 The city's first library building was erected on the NW corner of Pomona and Wilshire Avenues with a $10,000 grant from Andrew Carnegie.

1927 A separate Children's Library was built as an annex to the Carnegie library. Mary Campbell served as the first children's librarian. Later the building was relocated to Hillcrest Park for use by the American Red Cross.

1942 The Carnegie Library was razed to make way for a new building on the same site. The construction project was funded by the Works Progress Administration (WPA) of the federal government. Population 11,000. Today this building houses the Fullerton Museum Center.

1955 The City introduced the very first bookmobile in Orange County. Population 43,412.

1961 The Friends of the Fullerton Public Library was established.

1962 Norton Simon and the Hunt Food & Industries Foundation, donated a building and park located in Southwest Fullerton, to the city on the condition that it is "used solely for a public library and public library park." The donation became known as the Hunt Branch and is located at 201 S. Basque Avenue. Population 64,100.

1971 A joint powers agreement was entered into between the County of Orange and the City of Fullerton for the purpose of issuing $1.3 million in revenue bonds to finance construction of a new Main Library on Commonwealth Avenue.

1972 Ostrich Eggs for Breakfast; a History of Fullerton for Boys and Girls, written by children's librarian Dora May Sim and illustrated by Wanda Collins, was first printed. The book would become required reading for all Fullerton public school third grade students.

1973 The new Main Library at 353 W. Commonwealth Avenue was dedicated. The former library at the corner of Pomona and Wilshire Avenues would later become home to the Fullerton Museum Center. Population 90,000.

1986 The Fullerton Public Library became the first public library in Orange County to computerize the circulation (checking in and out) of books by barcoding books and library cards.

1987 For the first time in its history, the Library checked out more than one million items in a single year.

1994 The Fullerton Public Library was the last public library in Orange County to replace the card catalog with a computerized card catalog on computer terminals for public use. The Fullerton Public Library Foundation was established. Population 119,500.

1997 The City Council approved the Library Board of Trustees' plans to expand the Main Library. The city launched the library's first web page. Population 125,000.

1999 Construction began on a $1.6 million expansion of the Main Library funded primarily with a Redevelopment bond. The Children's Library closed for 12 months during construction.

2000 The Library Foundation raised $318,000 in support of the Children's Library expansion and for library technology. The Friends of the Library contributed an additional $45,000 towards the expansion project. A new bookmobile arrived. The Main Library received a private donation from the Bill & Melinda Gates Foundation for new public computers and a technology lab. Internet service became accessible to the public. A self-checkout machine at the Main Library was installed. Population 128,255.

2005 The Library began digitizing photographs in the local history collection and making them available via the Internet and the library's catalog. Both the Main Library and the Hunt Branch became wi-fi hotspots, supporting laptop computer connections to the Library's databases and the Internet. Population 135,672.

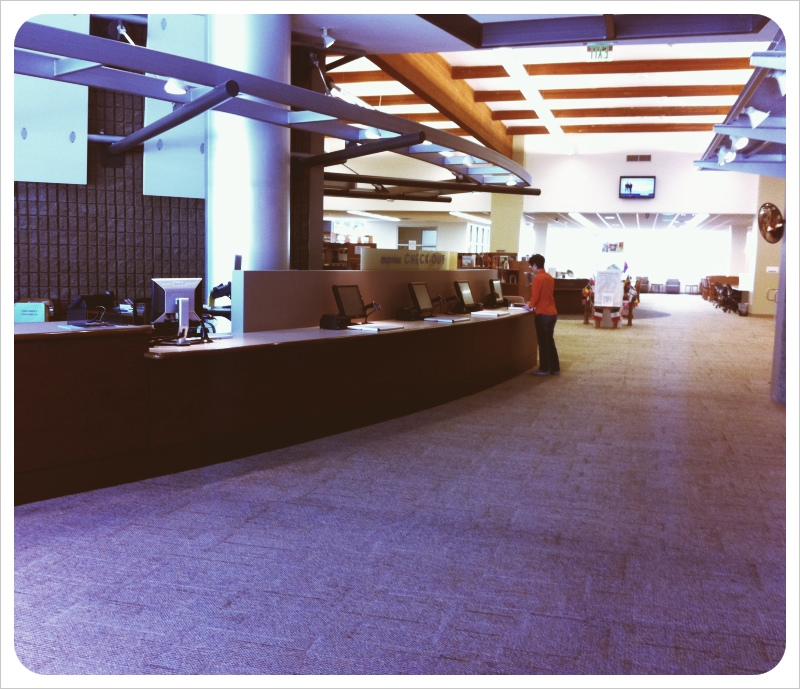
The remodeled lobby and self check out machines.

2006 The Fullerton Public Library celebrated its 100th year in operation. The library also participated in One Book, One Community, with programs about and influenced by Khaled Hosseini's Kite Runner.

2007 Began its first adult summer reading program, called the Women of Mystery, which shares the same mystery theme with the children's summer reading program, Get a Clue.

2008 The Library had its second annual One Book One Community Program on Homer Hickman's Rocket Boys.

2009 Library expansion plans are moving forward with construction slated to begin March 2010.

2011 July 23 The Main Library reopens after a $10 million expansion and remodel. The library added a new conference center, group study rooms, a cafe, expanded Local History room, and redesigned teen area, computer lab, and floor plan. The newly redesigned library was certified LEED gold.

2011 Read The Grapes of Wrath for its annual Fullerton Reads celebration.

2012 Celebrated Farewell to Manzanar as part of its Fullerton Reads program.

== Carolyn Johnson Children's Room ==
The children's department in the Fullerton Public Library is named for Carolyn Johnson. Carolyn Johnson began as a children's librarian at the Fullerton Public Library in 1945 until 1959 when she became Children's Services Coordinator. She remained in that position until 1981 when she became director of the library until her retirement in 1990. The children's department serves children with books, activities, and computers from birth until 8th grade.

They provide a variety of programs targeting different ages, including toddler storytime, pre-school storytime, Book Babies, and Bedtime Bears (storytimes for families in the evening), school visits, school nights, parent nights, and the After School Club (crafts, activities, puppet shows, and stories for elementary aged children).

Each summer the Fullerton Public Library has a Summer Reading Club where approximately 3200 kids participate. This includes members of the Read to Me Club (where parents read to not yet literate children), elementary age children, and young adults (7th grade to 12th grade). The children's department also creates lists of recommended reading for grades K-8. Furthermore, the library also offers Tumblebooks which is an online database of children's e-books.

== The Bookmobile ==
Established in 1955, Fullerton Public Library established the first bookmobile in Orange County In October 2012, the library's ad hoc committee recommended that the current bookmobile which had been largely out of service since 2011, should discontinue service entirely. As of 2016, the Bookmobile has been sold, and the library no longer provides Bookmobile service.

== Local History Room ==
The Local History Room, formerly known as the Launer History room is dedicated to information regarding Fullerton, Fullerton history, and to a lesser extent the surrounding communities. The Local History Room was originally established in 1973 with funds from Lulu Convis Launer in honor of her late husband Albert Launer.

Many of the materials in the history room are from Fullerton's early history and development and include books, scrapbooks, personal narratives written by early residents, program brochures, periodical and newspaper clippings, maps, local telephone books, city directories, photographs, videotapes, microfilm, slides, posters, and memorabilia.

The local history room has several projects in the works including digitizing two photograph collections which are available online: the Fullerton Building Survey as well as the Centennial Collection. In 2012, the library undertook an oral history project, interviewing almost 20 Fullerton residents who had lived in the city since the 1950s and in some cases since the 1920s.

== Hunt Branch ==
The second branch/location of the Fullerton Public Library is the Hunt Branch. The building was designed by renowned architect William L. Pereira, the architect of the Transamerica Pyramid in San Francisco, CA. The Hunt Branch is located in south-west Fullerton and was donated in 1962 to the city by the Norton Simon Foundation and Hunt Foods for express use as a public library.

The Hunt branch had been proposed as a future site of the future Norton Simon art collection, however, negotiations fell through, and it became the Hunt Branch instead, while the art went to the Norton Simon Museum in Pasadena, California.

The Hunt Branch provides books, computer access and wifi, programs for children and adults including story-times, book-clubs, and after-school activities, and rental meeting room space.

In March 2013, the Hunt Branch was temporarily closed. Its future is currently being debated; however, the Fullerton City council has not provided funding to operate the branch through June 2015. Neighboring property owner (Grace Ministries) is currently leasing the building on a month-to-month basis.

== Teen Area ==
The Fullerton Public Library features the Teen Area, created in 2007 and expanded in 2011 to serve Fullerton area teens with a dedicated space within the library. The room consists of a quiet study/reading area and a room for group work and fun events as well as a private group study room. The teen collection features over 1700 manga titles, over 2500 young adult book titles, and over 500 graphic novels available for check out or browsing and an art wall with art from young talented Fullerton area artists.

== Special Collections ==
- Mary Campbell Collection: over 500 rare and antique children's books including a 1902, first edition of Just So Stories by Rudyard Kipling
- Fullerton Local History Collection
- Small Business Collection
- Travel Collection
- Large Print Book Collection
- Foreign Language Material Collections: Spanish, Korean, Chinese.

== Publications by the Fullerton Public Library ==
- Ostrich Eggs for Breakfast A history of Fullerton written for children by former Fullerton Public Library Librarian Dora May Sim.
- Images of Yesterday: Fullerton Photo Album A collection of photographs from Fullerton's History researched and compiled by Evelyn Cadman and Jane Mueller.
- Images of America: Fullerton ISBN 0-7385-2940-0 A collection of photographs from the Launer History Room's photograph collection.
- Postcard History Series: Fullerton ISBN 0-7385-4788-3 ISBN 978-0738547886 A collection of over 200 postcards depicting Fullerton's history from the Launer History Room's collection as well as private contributions.

== Photo gallery ==
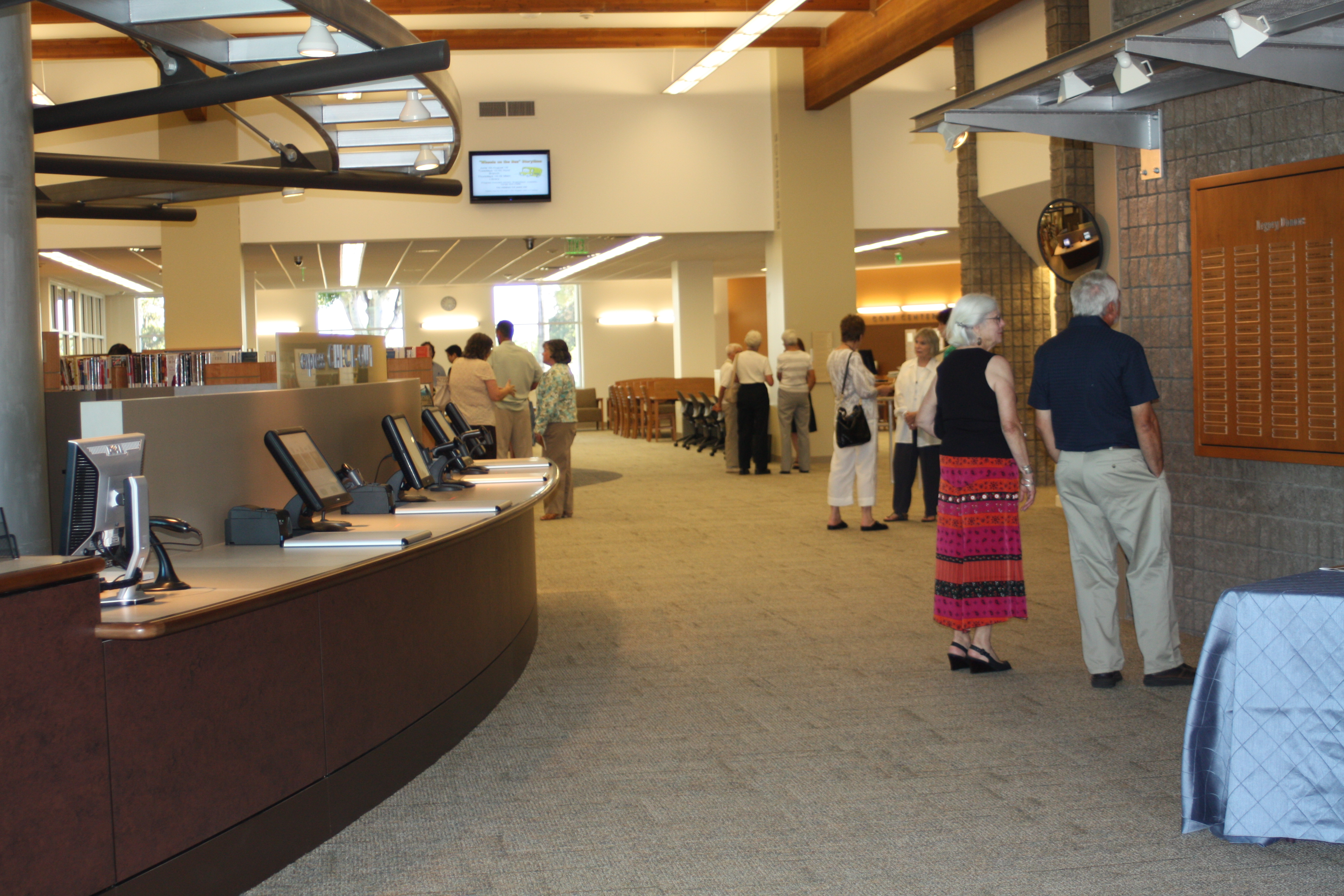
Library lobby

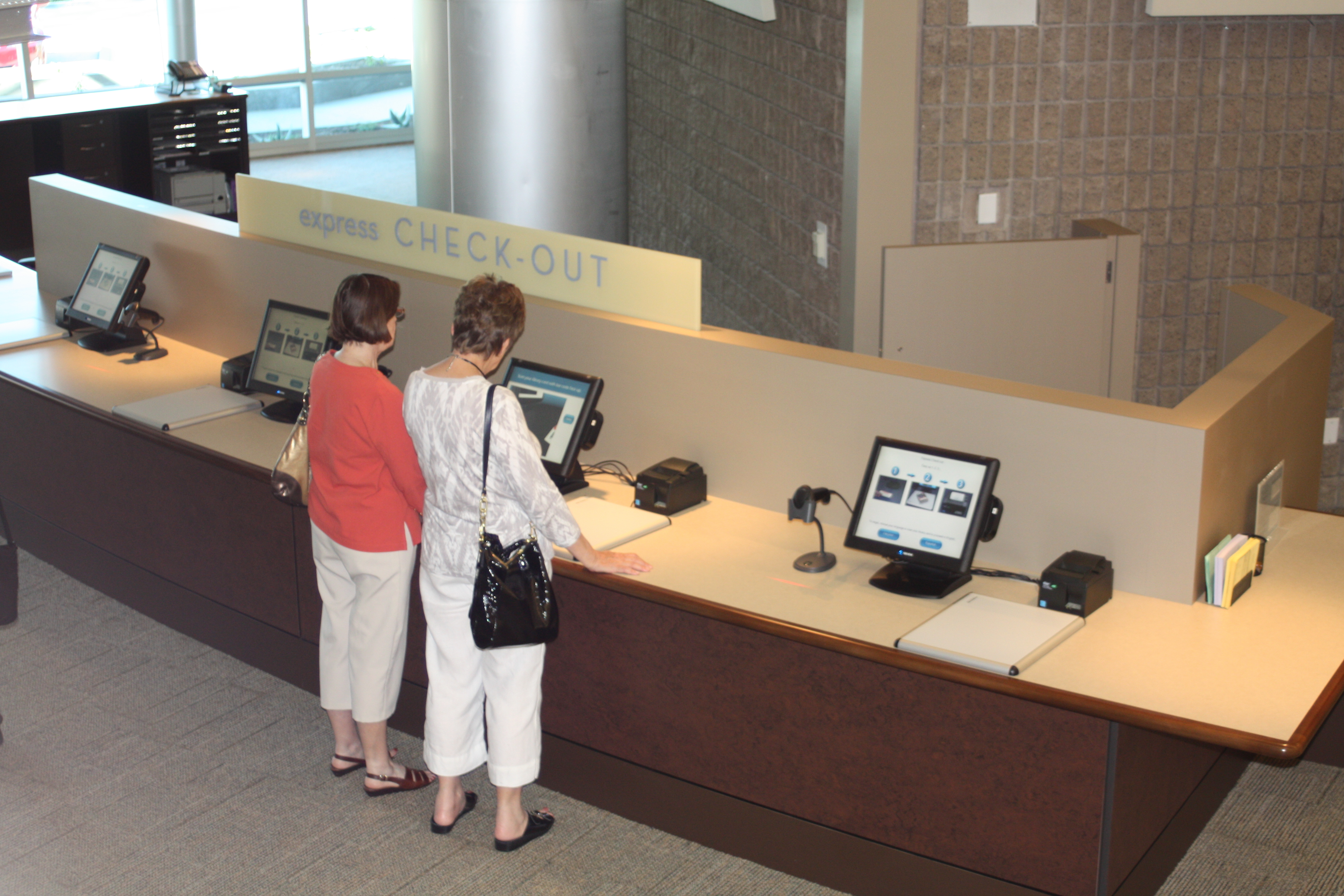
Self check out machines

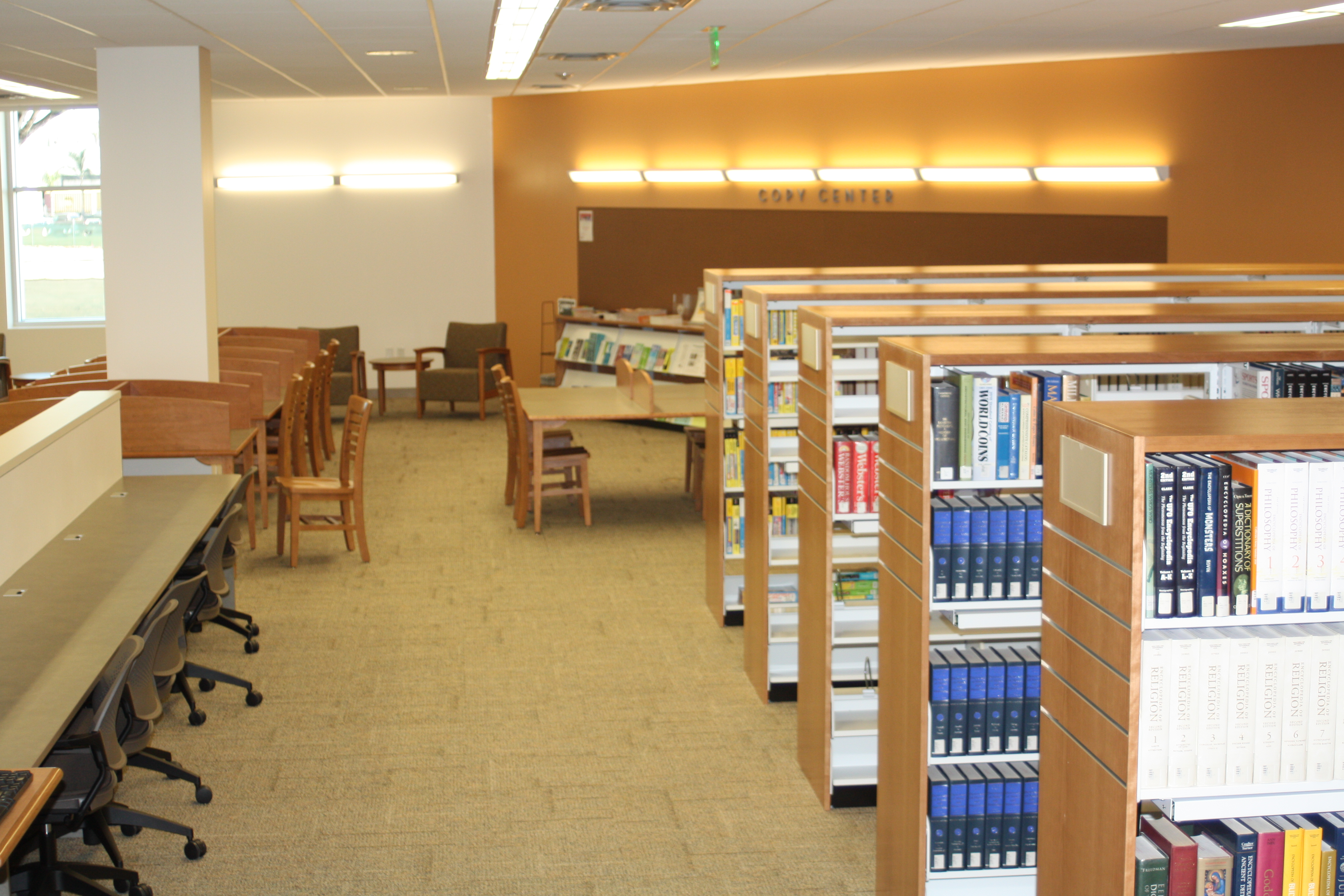
Reference books

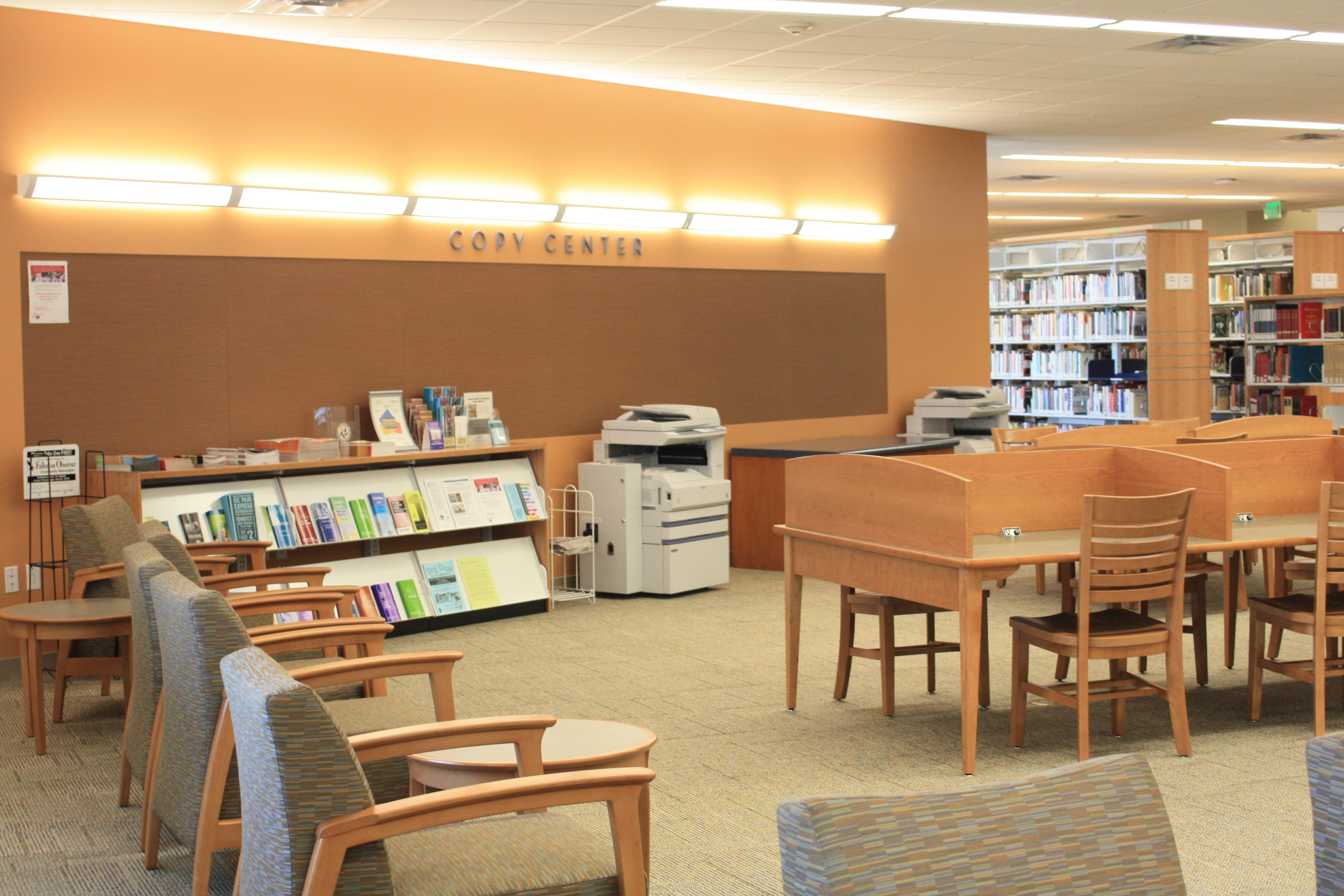
Copy center and study tables

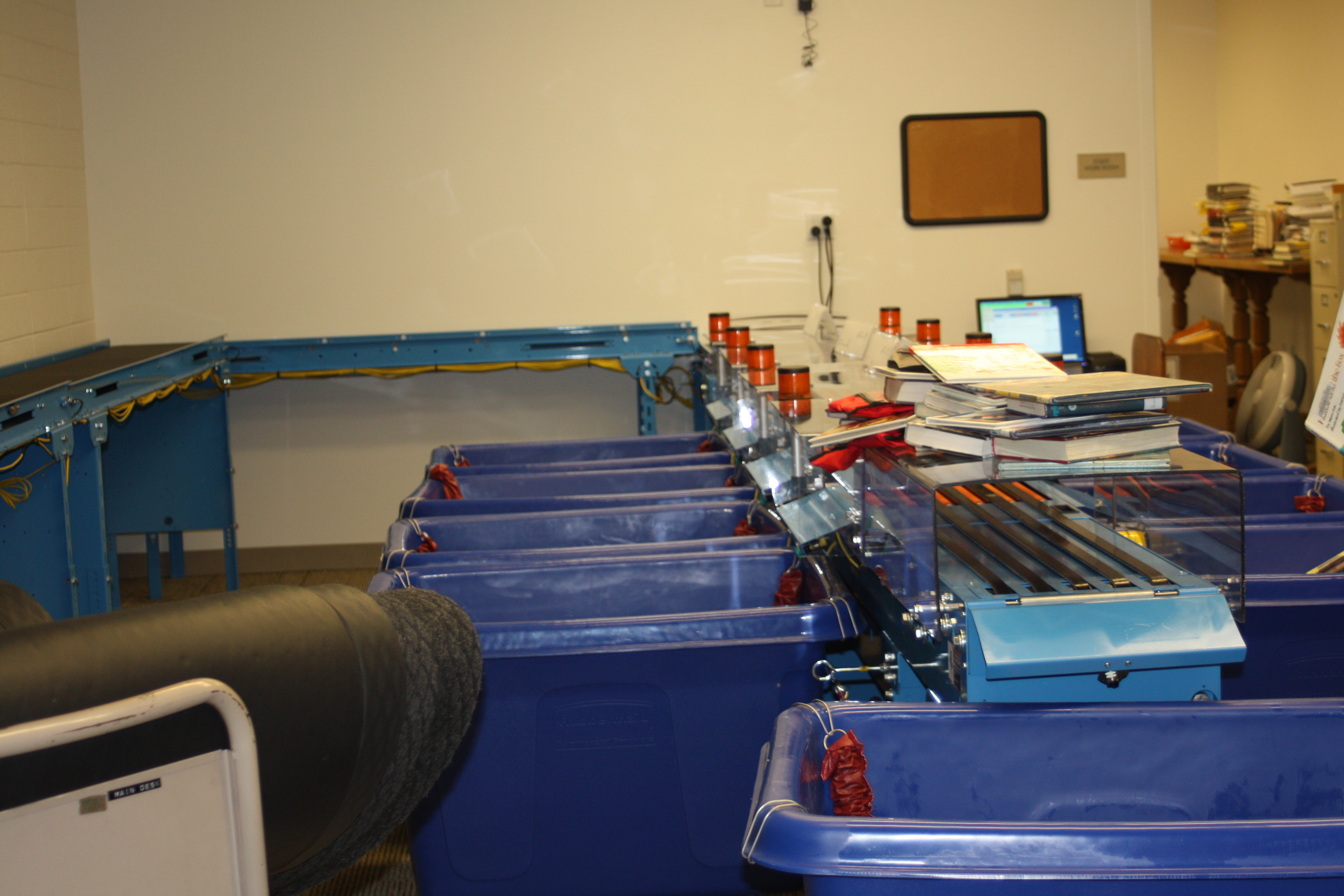
Book sorting machines

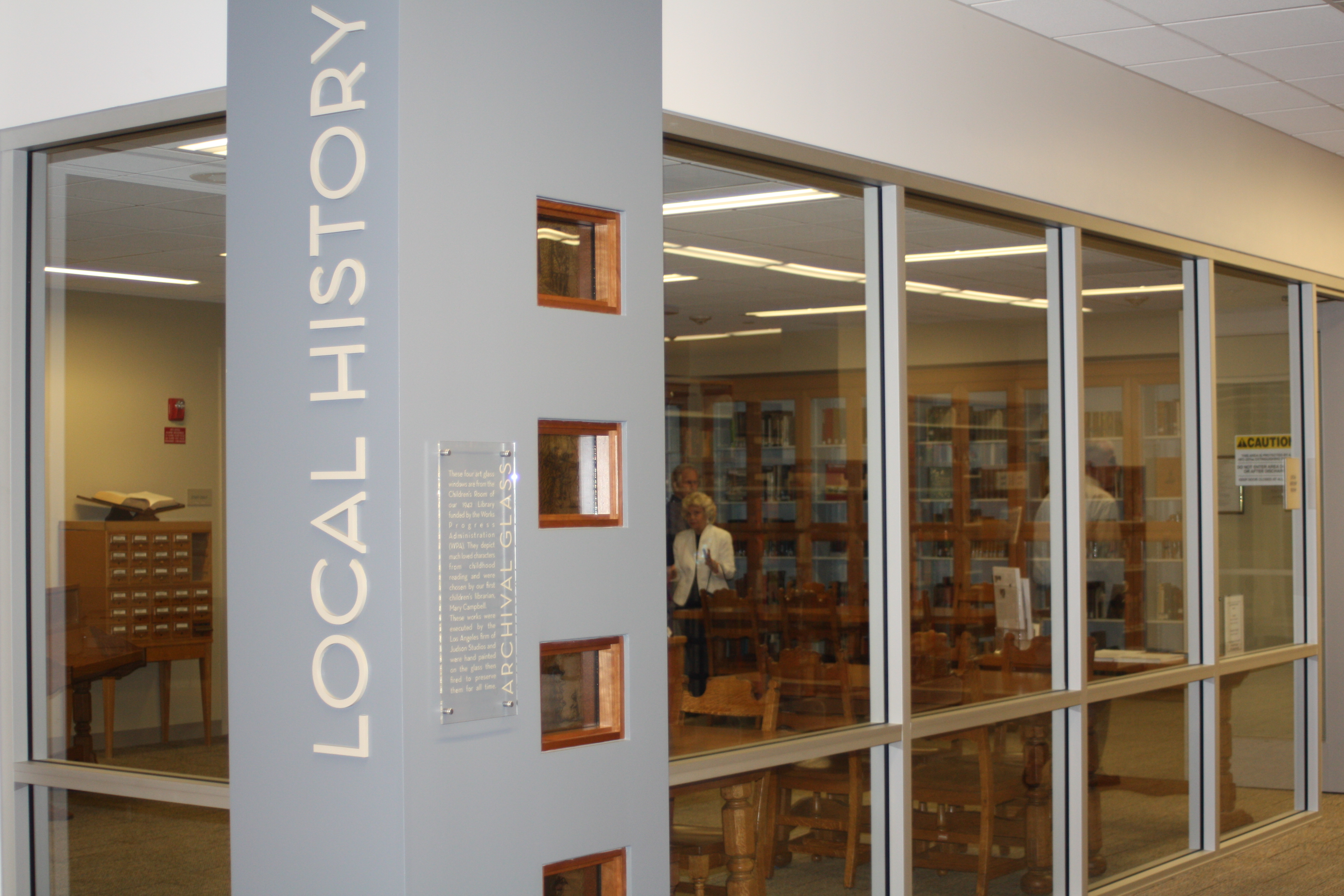
Local History room

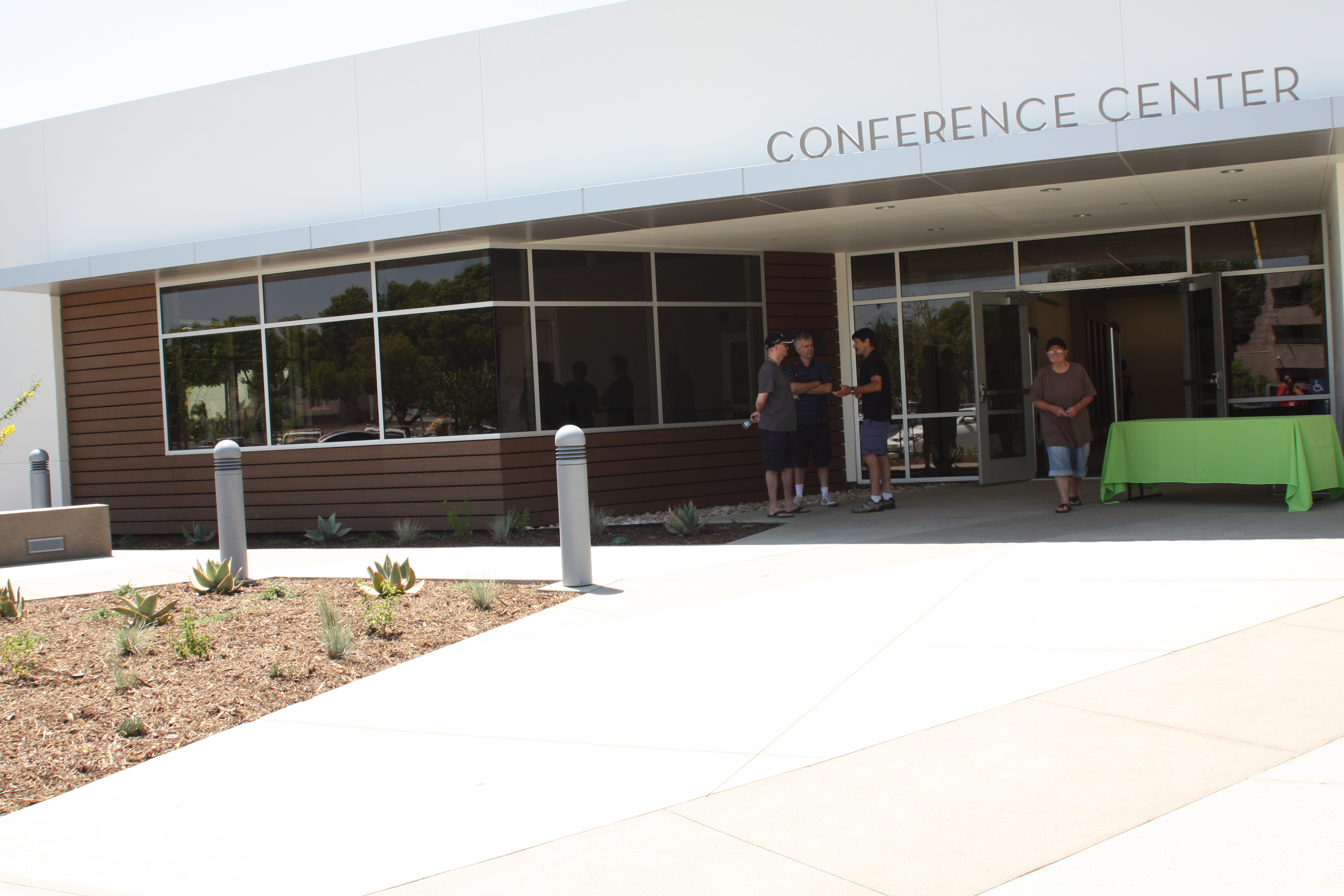
Entrance to the Conference Center

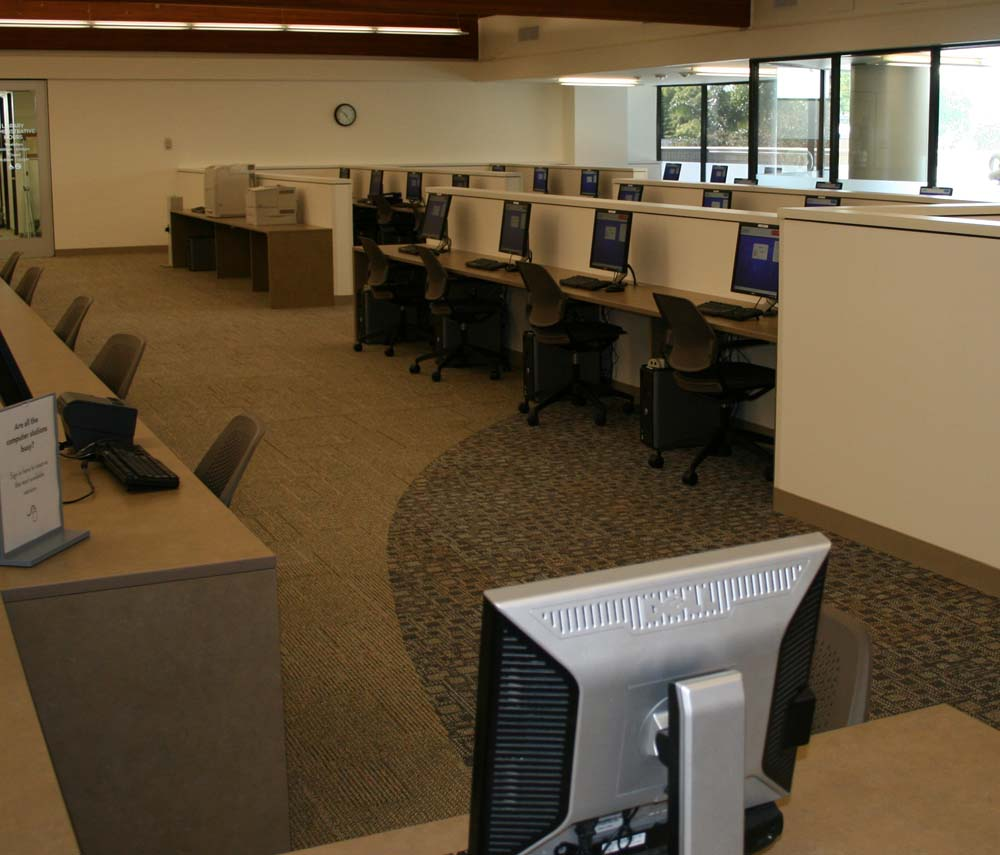
Computer lab

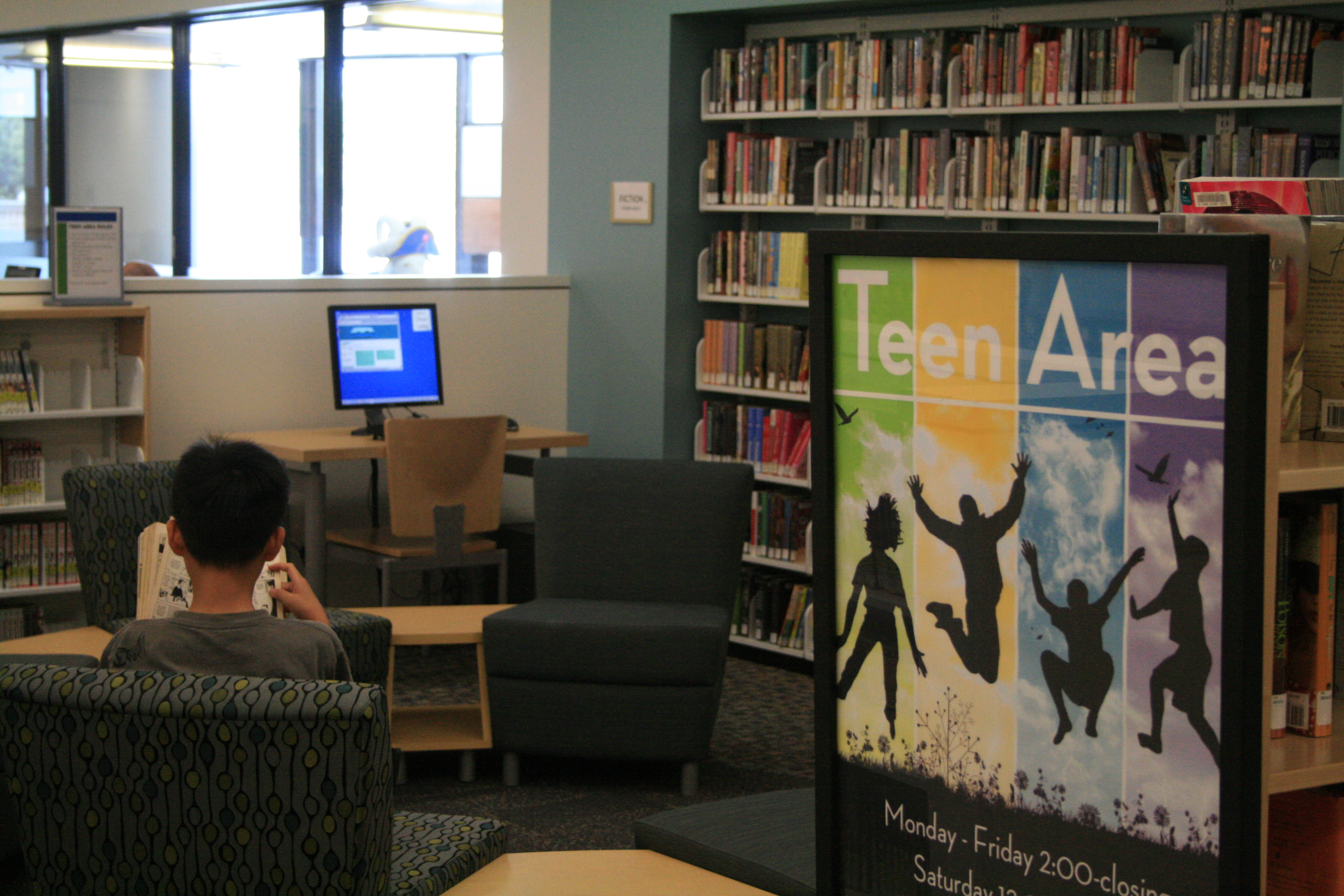
Teen Area - quiet zone

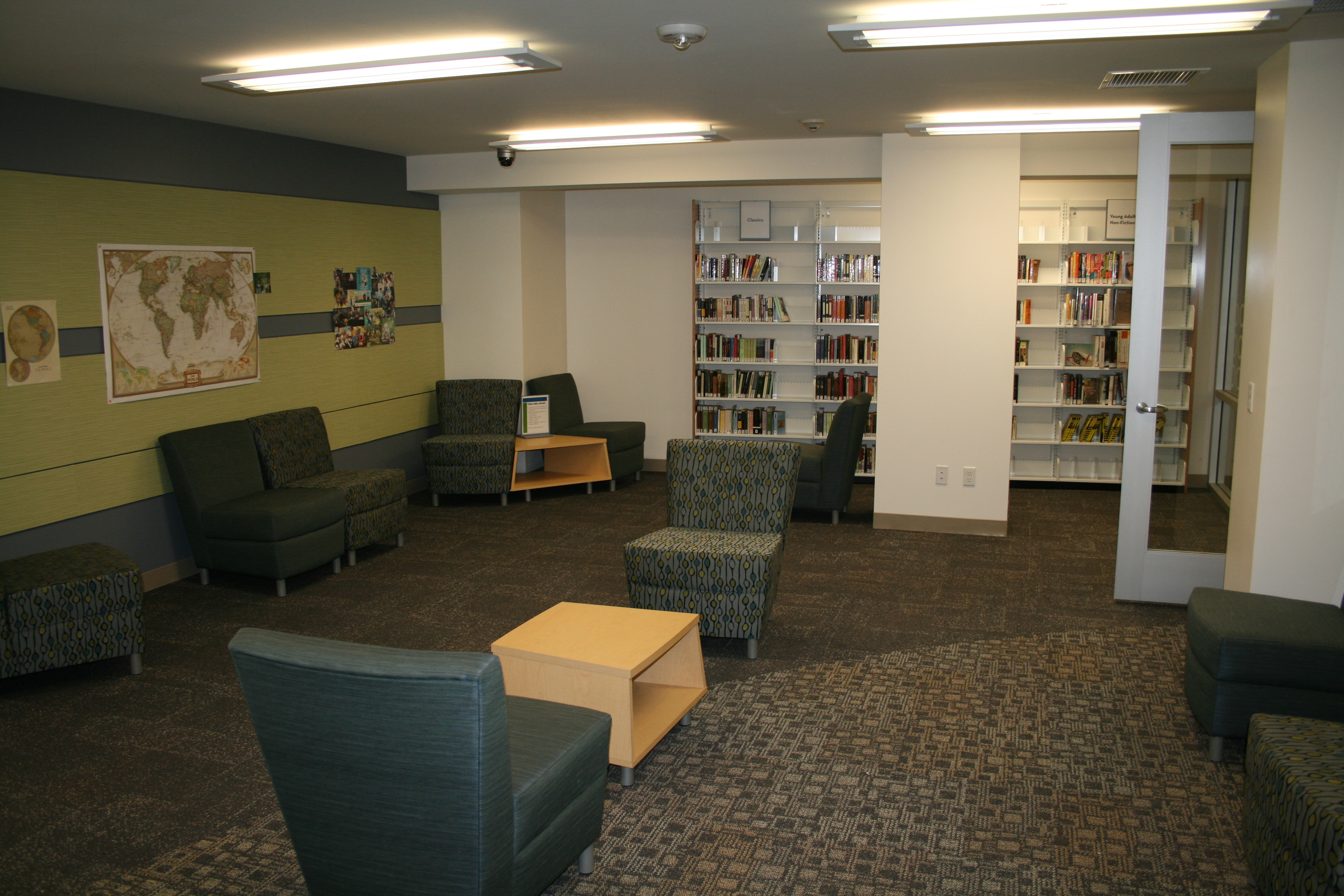
Teen Area - active zone
