= Elizabeth Eilor =

Ugandan activist

- Elizabeth Atyang Eilor
- Citizenship: Ugandan
- Occupations: Activist, economist, gender advisor
- Organization: African Women's Economic Policy Network (AWEPON)
- Known for: Women's economic empowerment, gender mainstreaming, macroeconomic policy advocacy

Elizabeth Eilor is a Ugandan activist and the former executive director of the African Women's Economic Policy Network (AWEPON). The organization trains women in economic literacy and advocacy. AWEPON is based in Uganda and spans some 20 countries in sub-Saharan Africa.

She serves as Senior Gender Advisor at the United Nations Office to the African Union (UNOAU) in Addis Ababa, Ethiopia where she focuses on integrating gender perspectives into peace and security initiatives across the continent.
