= Elisabeth Senault =

French calligrapher, engraver, artist

- Born: France
- Occupation: Artist, calligrapher, engraver
- Works: Book of Hours dedicated to Louis, Grand Dauphin
- Parent(s): Louis Senault

Elisabeth Senault was a French artist, calligrapher, and engraver, active in the late 17th century. She was trained by her father Louis Senault, who was a leading French engraver. Following her father's death, she created private prayer books for the French royal court. Senault engraved these prayer books using plates embellished with decorative borders, floral initials, delicate flowers, birds, tiny insects, arabesques, and flourishes, which imitated the intricacy and ornamentation of illuminated manuscript prayer books.
