= Elisabeth Kohn =

German-Jewish lawyer

Elisabeth Kohn (February 11, 1902, in Munich – November 25, 1941, near Kaunas) was a German-Jewish lawyer. In addition to her profession, she was involved in various social organizations, such as the SPD, the pacifist German League for Human Rights, the General German Trade Union Confederation and the SPD Munich Post. In November 1941, she was deported together with her mother and her sister Luise and murdered five days later in German-occupied Lithuania.
