= Élisabeth Vergelat =

French artist

Élisabeth Vergelat, later Desvernois, was a French painter active in Switzerland.

Vergelat is known to have been a painter of miniatures and pastellist. With her husband, the painter François-Joseph Desvernois, she lived in Geneva in 1787 and 1788. The couple's son, Joseph-Eugène Desvernois, would also become a painter and draughtsman; he was born in Lausanne in 1790. Little else is recorded of her career.
