= Elizabeth Millioud =

Mexican painter and sculptor (born 1939)

Elizabeth Millioud (born 1939) is a Mexican painter and sculptor.

Born in Mexico City, Millioud received some instruction in ceramics and mosaic work, but was largely self-taught. In 1963 she held her first solo exhibition, at the Mexican-North American Institute of Cultural Relations in Mexico City. Her work has since appeared in many exhibitions both in Mexico and abroad.
