= William White (missionary) =

English missionary (1794–1875)

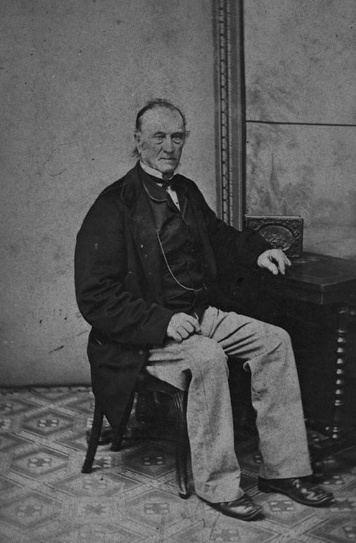
- Born: 11 February 1794; Ingleton, County Durham, England
- Died: 25 November 1875 (aged 81); Auckland, New Zealand
- Occupations: Missionary; Trader
- Spouse: Eliza White

William White (11 February 1794 – 25 November 1875) was an English-born missionary for the Wesleyan Church in early colonial New Zealand.

Born in England, White came to New Zealand in 1823 to establish the first Wesleyan mission in the country, Wesleydale, at Kaeo, near Whangaroa Harbour. He later took charge of Māngungu Mission in the Hokianga, having returned to England to find a wife in the interim. Further stations were established along the west coast of the North Island. A difficult personality, he soon alienated fellow missionaries over the running of the mission and was recalled to England in 1836. After an investigation, he was dismissed from the Wesleyan ministry two years later due to having been deemed to have conducted inappropriate commercial activity while in charge of the missions in New Zealand. He briefly worked for the New Zealand Company until he fell out with its leaders. He went back to New Zealand and settled in the Hokianga, preaching and trading. His business interests suffered when a cargo of timber was lost in a shipwreck. He died in Auckland, aged 81.

== Early life ==
Born in Ingleton, County Durham, on 11 February 1794, William White was the eldest son of Francis and Hannah White. He was a cabinet maker by trade but was also a lay preacher in the Wesleyan Church. He was ordained as a missionary in the Wesleyan Missionary Society (WMS) on 23 January 1822, on the same day as his fellow missionary Nathaniel Turner, and dispatched to New Zealand to assist the Reverend Samuel Leigh in forming the first WMS mission in the country.

== Missionary ==
Shortly after his ordination, White left for Australia aboard the Deveron, where he transferred to the St. Michael, which carried supplies for the proposed WMS station. He arrived in New Zealand in May 1823 and he and Leigh established the Wesleydale station at Kaeo, near Whangaroa Harbour. Other missionaries, including Nathaniel Turner, John Hobbs and James Stack, joined them. White soon found himself in charge, due to Leigh relocating to Sydney on account of his poor health. Conflict with local Māori, who were more interested in the commercial opportunities provided by the mission's stores than adapting to Christianity, soon arose. The tensions in the area were such that White scouted out possible locations for a new station, travelling as far as the central Waikato in 1825. Hearing of possible plans by Anglican missionaries to open stations in the area, he urged the establishment of further WMS missions.

In 1826, White returned to England to seek a wife, leaving Turner as the only ordained Methodist missionary in New Zealand. While doing so, he worked at a number of parishes including in Northampton and later in Cornwall. He wed Eliza Leigh, who was 20 years old, on 30 June 1829 at Bluntisham in Huntingdonshire. In the meantime, the original WMS station at Kaeo had been abandoned after being raided by local Māori and the Wesleyan missionaries had relocated to the Hokianga. A new station, Māngungu Mission, had been set up there and in January 1830 White and his wife arrived to take charge. A few months later, the couple's first child was stillborn. A son was born the following year but died at the age of six months.

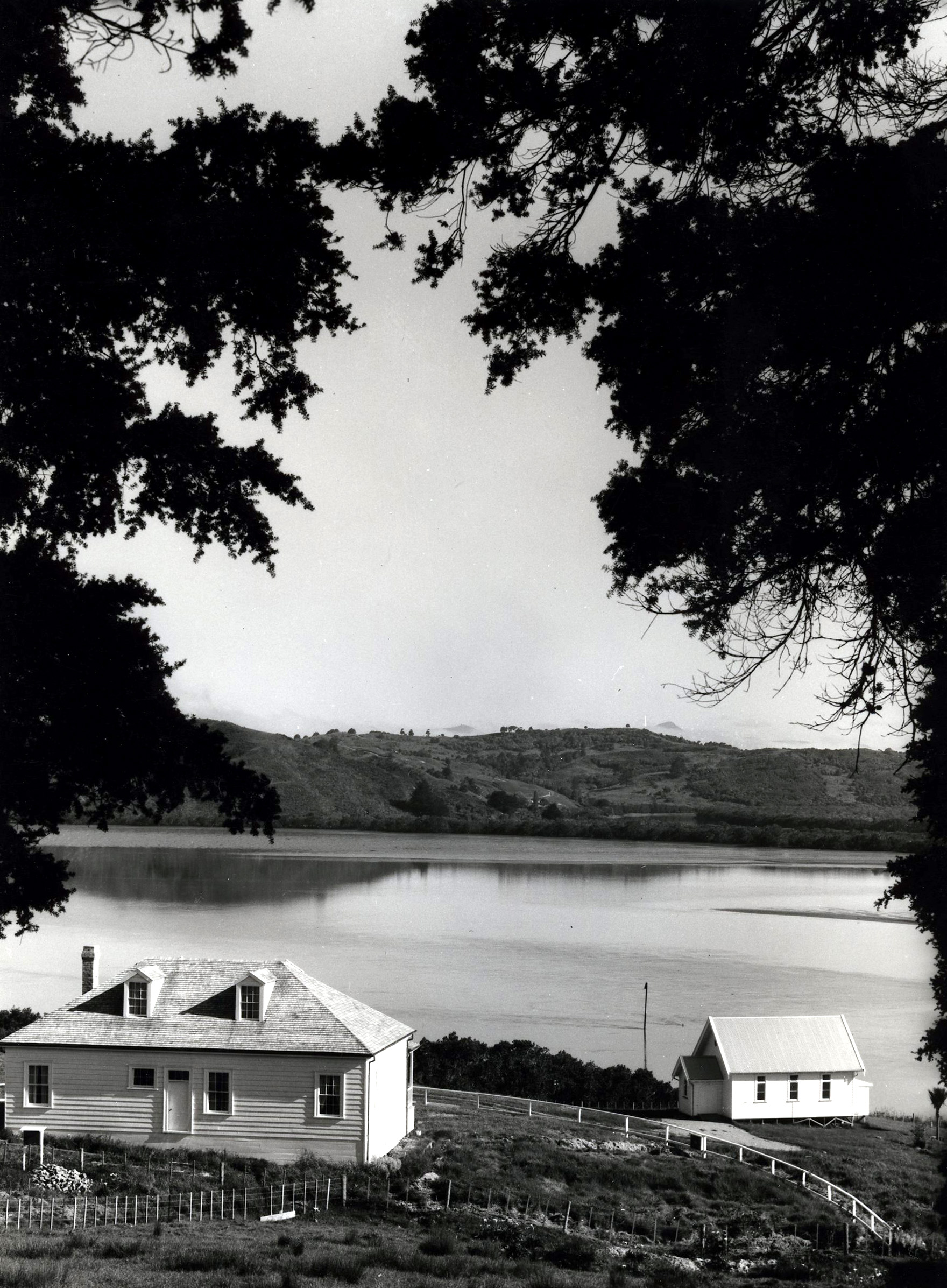
The WMS mission house, on the left, with St John's Community Church on the right, at Māngungu Mission

White's objective at Māngungu was to expand the reach of the WMS, and he duly established further missions at Kāwhia and Waingaroa, on the west coast of the North Island. He wanted to set up a station at Whangape but this did not eventuate due to a lack of personnel. He soon came into conflict with Hobbs over the running of the mission and, within weeks of White's arrival, Hobbs wrote to the WMS in London requesting a new posting. Hobbs was eventually sent to Tonga in September, although White maintained their working relationship was harmonious.

The Hokianga saw much commercial activity, mainly in kauri timber. White soon came into conflict with Europeans in the area, seeking to prevent them from acquiring all the Māori land and timber. He controlled access to the mission stores, only allowing those colonists deemed acceptable to enter into trade. He came to an arrangement where he purchased land and returned it to the local iwi (tribe) in return for the sawmilling and selling of timber on WMS land. The monies gained would be set against that paid for the land. Colonists were upset at being disadvantaged by this tactic, and White also annoyed his fellow WMS missionaries, who had to do sawmilling work and considered it ate into their preaching time.

== Dismissal from the WMS ==
White's downfall came in 1836, when he sought to prevent Thomas McDonnell, who owned a store at nearby Horeke and had an official role in the area as Additional British Resident, subordinate to James Busby in the Bay of Islands, from purchasing land at Kaipara. He also endeavoured to abolish the trade of alcohol in the Hokianga but was rebuffed by McDonnell, who refused to enact measures against the colonists. White threatened to use Māori force in order to secure compliance from the colonists. Busby was called in to help settle the matter but to no avail. McDonnell's response was to raise allegations of adultery against White. He obtained statements from at least two Māori women and supporting evidence was supplied by White's aggrieved colleagues at Māngungu. As a result, White was recalled to England in July.

After an investigation by a committee of 11 members which included several Wesleyan superintendents and mission secretaries, White was dismissed from Wesleyan service in March 1838. It was deemed that the WMS property at Mangungu had been misused and there was undue focus on commercial activity, even though it was intended to prevent Māori from being exploited. Although the adultery allegations could not be proven, and in fact most of the evidence was dismissed outright, he was still criticised for his personal conduct. His colleagues considered him to be mentally unbalanced and possessed with a violent temper.

== Later life ==
During the WMS investigation into his conduct at Māngungu, White had found employment with the New Zealand Company. His role there was to advise on emigration prospects. Although the working relationship was initially amicable, he soon came to the belief that the company would employ underhand tactics to obtain land from Māori and parted ways. After receiving the confirmation of his dismissal from the WMS, he returned to New Zealand. Arriving in December 1838, White settled back at Māngungu, living next door to the WMS station. He tried to disrupt the activities of the New Zealand Company in the Waikato and Taranaki by making frequent trips to these regions and discouraging local Māori from selling their land.

Life at Māngungu was hallmarked by tension with his former colleagues, and White was often derogatory of them. In 1839, he raised his own allegations of inappropriate conduct against the missionaries James Wallis, John Whiteley, Nathaniel Turner and William Woon, although these were overshadowed by counterclaims, made by local Māori, against White of ongoing poor treatment of women. Despite this, he continued to act as a missionary, preaching and praying with the Māori converts, while challenging the rights of the legitimate Wesleyan missionaries to do the same.

As well as preaching, White became a trader in timber and land agent. He began to assert his rights to land he had purchased while in charge of Māngungu. His timber business was subject to reprisals by local competitors, with his premises being burgled in 1840. However, his commercial interests suffered after the Aurora, on which he was travelling along with a load of his timber, sank at Kaipara Harbour on 27 April 1840, an event which nearly claimed his life. Some of his land deeds were also lost in the shipwreck. He continued to struggle with his timber business in the Hokianga, but during the Flagstaff War he and his family were evacuated to Auckland. They settled in Grey's Avenue in central Auckland while he returned north to support Tāmati Wāka Nene, a prominent Ngāpuhi rangatira (chief), in the fighting against Hōne Heke. After the fighting died down, White rejoined his family, still in Auckland. He sold off his remaining land in the Hokianga to settle his debts. He appears to have later worked as a carpenter. In 1862, he was involved in a police action, when he assaulted an interpreter during arbitration proceedings over a civil dispute concerning Māori land. He was found guilty of the offence.

White died at his home on 25 November 1875, aged 81; reportedly, not long beforehand he had ridden a horse for 40 miles (64 km) and then exhausted himself gardening the next day. He was survived by his wife, Eliza, and two adult children. John Hobbs presided over the interment of White's remains at Symonds Street Cemetery in Auckland, at which several other clergymen were present.

== Legacy ==
The events of the 1830s meant that White was often used as a scapegoat for the relatively poor results achieved by the Wesleyan mission to New Zealand. His reputation was such that in 1927, when a memorial to Methodist missionaries was erected at Māngungu, his name was omitted from the list of names engraved on the memorial. However, fifty years later an additional plaque was added to the memorial, on which his name was included.
