= Māngungu Mission =

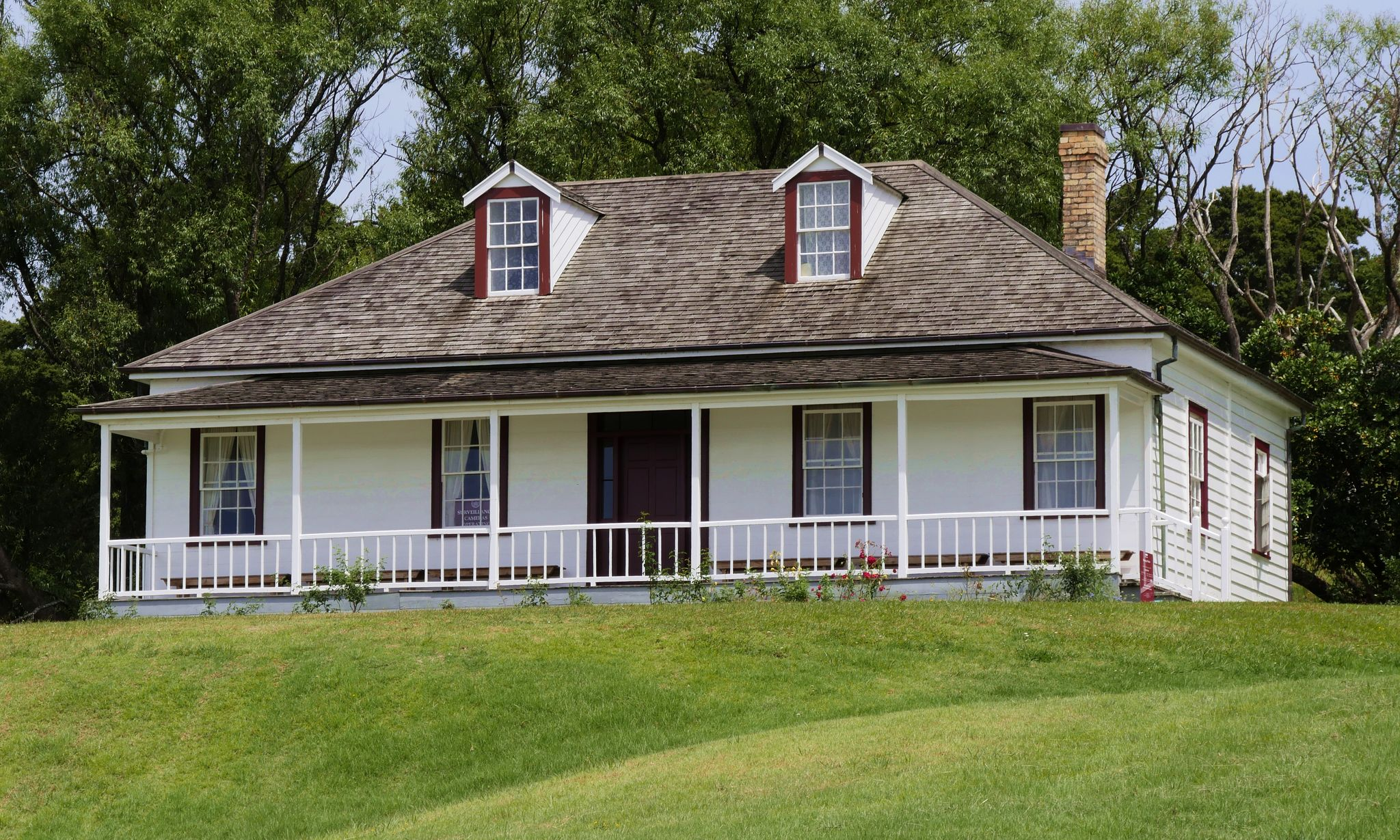
- A view of the front of the mission house at Māngungu Mission
- Interactive map of Māngungu Mission
- 35°21′17.44″S 173°34′7.14″E
- Location: near Horeke, New Zealand

History
- Built: 1828

Heritage New Zealand – Category 1
- Designated: 1 September 1983
- Reference no.: 75

Māngungu Mission was the second mission station established in New Zealand by the Wesleyan Missionary Society. Located near Horeke, in the Hokianga Harbour, it was founded in 1828 by the missionaries John Hobbs and James Stack after the first WMS mission station in the country had been sacked the previous year. Māngungu Mission was abandoned in 1855 when Hobbs, the sole missionary at the site, relocated to Auckland. The residence that Hobbs built and lived in at the mission has been preserved by Heritage New Zealand and is now a museum.

== Background ==
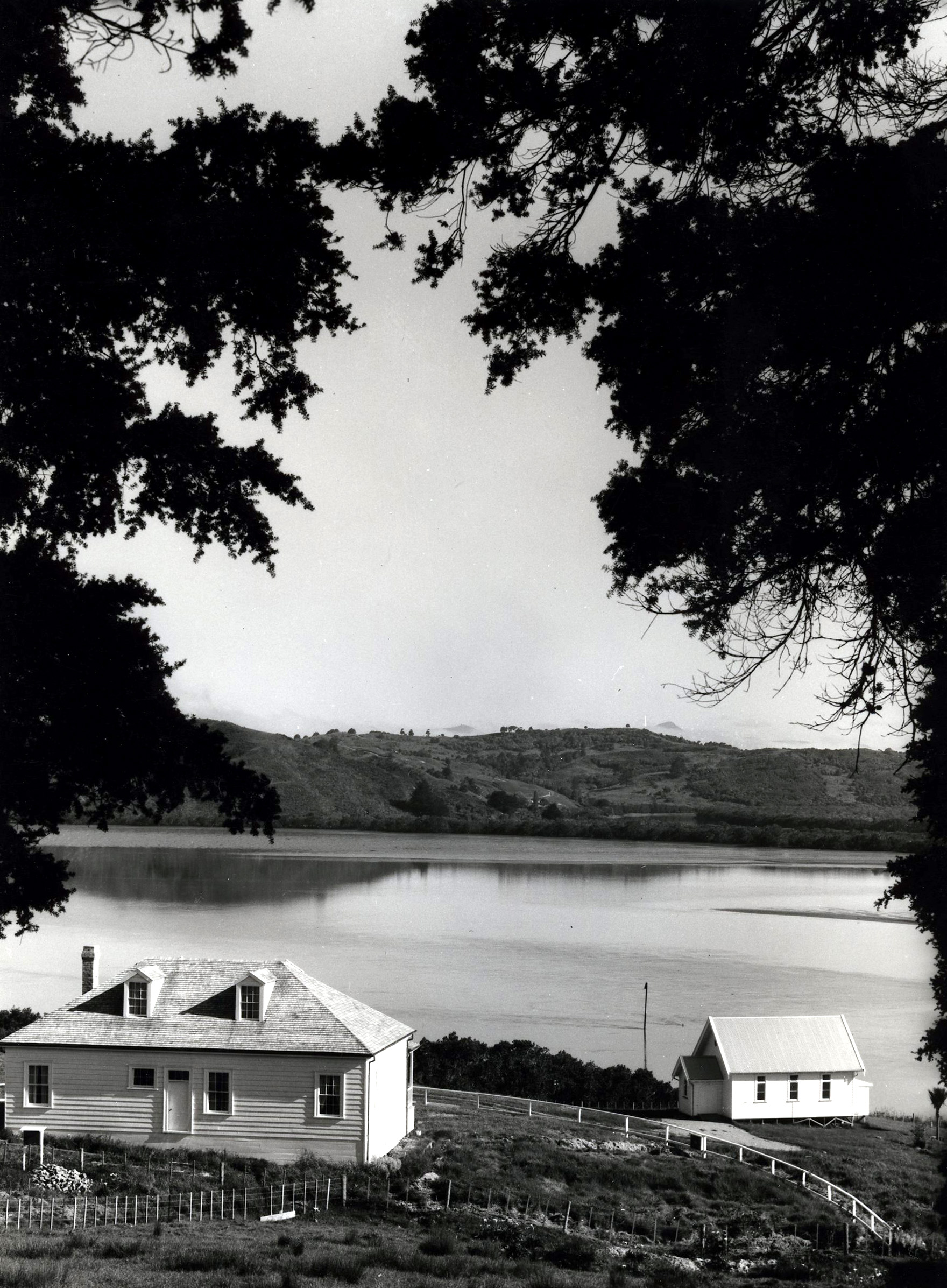
The WMS mission house, on the left, with St John’s Community Church on the right, at the site of the Māngungu Mission

The Wesleyan Missionary Society (WMS), following the advocacy of Samuel Leigh, a WMS missionary in Australia, sought to establish itself in New Zealand. The first WMS mission station in New Zealand, called Wesleydale, was duly founded at Kaeo, near Whangaroa Harbour, in June 1823 by Leigh and William White. Shortly afterwards, due to his failing health Leigh was replaced by Nathaniel Turner. It struggled to gain the patronage of local Māori and after it was sacked in 1827, the missionaries abandoned it.

== Foundation ==
The WMS missionaries, led by John Hobbs and James Stack, relocated to the Hokianga Harbour, where the following year, the Māngungu Mission was founded. Soon half a dozen buildings had been erected on the site, near Horeke, for the missionaries and their families. The mission was now led by William White, who had arrived in January 1830 to take over from Hobbs. White's objective at Māngungu was to expand the reach of the WMS, and he duly established further missions at Kāwhia and Waingaroa, on the west coast of the North Island. He wanted to set up a station at Whangape but this did not eventuate due to a lack of personnel.

== History ==
Tensions soon arose between White and Hobb over the running of the station and Hobbs sought and received a posting to Tonga. White also came into conflict with the European colonists in the area, seeking to reduce their influence on local Māori and prevent them from being exploited. He controlled access to the mission stores, only allowing those colonists deemed acceptable to enter into trade. He came to an arrangement where he purchased land and returned it to the local iwi (tribe) in return for the saw milling and selling of timber on WMS land. The monies gained would be set against that paid for the land. The colonists were upset at being disadvantaged by this tactic but White also annoyed his fellow WMS missionaries, who had to perform the saw milling work and considered it compromised their preaching. He was eventually recalled to England in 1836.

The original mission house burnt down in August 1838. John Hobbs, now back at Māngungu Mission, had in his youth been an apprentice carpenter and set about building a replacement, assisted by volunteers from the European population in the area. Nathaniel Turner, who had taken over the running of the mission from White, moved into the new house the following year. It was constructed with a rectangular floor plan having seven rooms, one of which was a large parlour, a pair of dormer windows and a verandah along the front.

The first honey bee hives in New Zealand were established at the mission in March 1839; Mary Bumby, who had arrived at the site with her missionary brother that month, had brought two hives with her. This led to the production of the first honey in the country.

On 12 February 1840, the mission was the site of a meeting for a number of rangatira (chiefs) to sign the Treaty of Waitangi. William Hobson, the Governor of New Zealand, stayed at the house for the ceremony. Around 3,000 people were present, and around 70 rangatira signed the treaty.

Following the departure of Turner for another WMS mission, Hobbs moved into the mission house in late 1840 with his family and by 1846, were the only missionary family at the site. By this time Māngungu Mission had decreased in importance to the WMS. The WMS headquarters in New Zealand was now in Auckland, having moved there two years previously. It was still a pleasant site; a visitor in late 1851 noted the presence of a windmill, a chapel, a cemetery and a number of outhouses, as well as the well appointed mission house. In 1855, it was decided to close Māngungu Mission in the face of a decline in the Māori population in the surrounding area. Hobbs and his family relocated to Auckland while the mission house was disassembled and shifted to Onehunga. It was subsequently used as a parsonage for Methodist priests for a number of years and then became a private residence.

== Museum ==
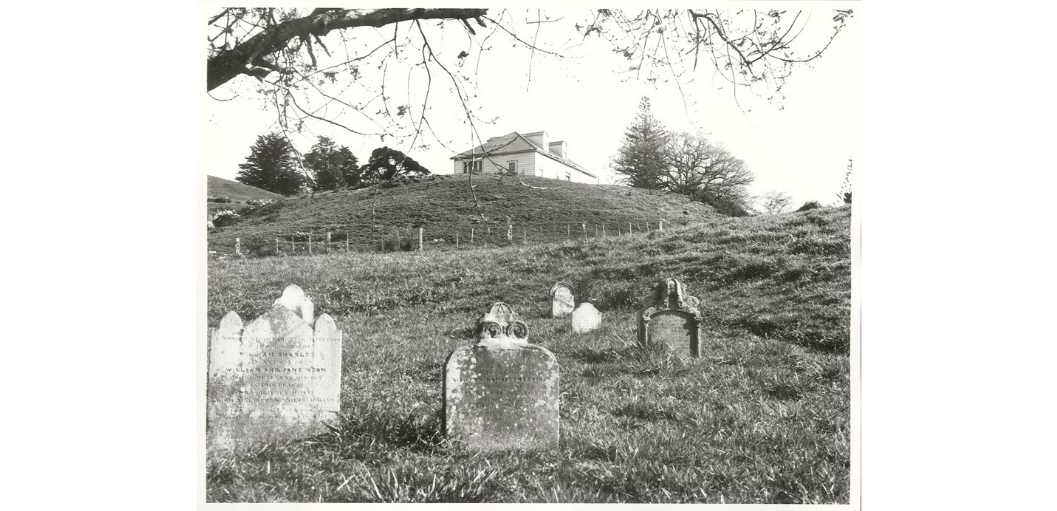
Mangungu Mission House with graveyard in the foreground; June 1974

In 1972, the mission house built by Hobbs was shifted from Onehunga back to the site of the Māngungu Mission and restored by the Historic Places Trust, the predecessor of Heritage New Zealand. A single story building, constructed from kauri timber, it was opened as a museum in 1977. Among its contents is a table, built by Hobbs, on which the Treaty of Waitangi was signed by those present at the ceremony that took place at the Māngungu Mission. The mission house was listed by the Historic Places Trust as a Historic Place Category 1 on 1 September 1983, with the list number 75. It is deemed to be of significance due to being the oldest surviving Methodist building in New Zealand as well as for its connection to the WMS's early presence in Northland and the signing of the Treaty of Waitangi. As well as the mission house, the site also includes a small church, St John's Community Church, which was relocated to the site from Kohukoku.
