= James Stack =

James Stack may refer to:

- James S. Stack (1852–1920), American judge, hotel owner, and politician
- James Stack (missionary) (1801–1883), Wesleyan Methodist missionary in New Zealand
- James West Stack (1835–1919), New Zealand missionary, clergyman, writer and interpreter
