= English Wesleyan Mission =

19th century British Methodist missionary society

The English Wesleyan Mission (also known as a Wesleyan Missionary Society) was a British Methodist missionary society that was involved in sending workers to countries such as New Zealand and China in the 19th century.

== Mission to New Zealand ==
The English Wesleyan minister Samuel Leigh visited New Zealand from Sydney, and on his return to England he proposed to the Missionary Society that a mission should be established in New Zealand. In February 1823 he arrived with William White and James Stack in Whangaroa Harbour and established Wesleydale, the Wesleyan mission at Kaeo, which is inland from the Whangaroa Harbour. John Hobbs and Nathaniel Turner arrived in Whangaroa Harbour in August 1823 with the Revd. Samuel Marsden, a Church Missionary Society (CMS) member who assisted the Wesleyan mission purchase land from the local Māori.

In 1826, Hongi Hika, a Māori rangatira (chief) and war leader of the Ngāpuhi iwi (tribe), moved to conquer Whangaroa. On 10 January 1827 a party of his warriors, without his knowledge, ransacked Wesleydale. The missionaries sought refuge at the CMS mission in Paihia and the Wesleydale mission was abandoned.

In 1827, Hobbs and Stack established a new mission at Manganugnu in the Hokianga. Between 1840 and 1845, the missionaries established further mission stations on the west coast of the North Island, including at Aotea, New Plymouth and Waimate (South Taranaki). In 1846 there were 14 mission stations with 17 missionaries, 345 native helpers, 2,960 church members, and 4,834 children at school.

== Mission to Tonga ==
The first efforts to evangelize the Tonga, or the Friendly Islands, were made by the London Missionary Society in 1797. But their labours were all but fruitless. In the midst of a native war, three of them were murdered and one apostatized to Paganism.

On August 16th, 1822, the Rev. Walter Lawry, pursuant to appointment by the British Wesleyan Conference of 1821, arrived at Tongataboo. Besides Mrs. Lawry and their infant child, he was accompanied by three other Europeans. The Mission opened favourably. Mr. Lawry was welcomed by the notably great chief, Fatu. Mr. Lawry was at first pleased and encouraged to believe his Mission would prosper ; but, in fourteen months, he left for England by way of Sydney. In 1825, they appointed the Revs. John Thomas and John Hutchinson to labour in Tongataboo. These Missionaries landed in June, 1826, and chose Hihifo as their station.

In October 1827 the Methodist Committee decided that Reverend Nathaniel Turner, then in Sydney, should be sent to Tonga, to relieve the resident minister who was very ill. As the previous missionaries had encountered a lot of trouble in Hihifo, Nathaniel decided to form the new station on another island in the Tonga group - Nukuʻalofa. The local chief was content, and gave them two local houses until they could build a permanent station. Turner set to learn the language, which was helped by his knowledge of Māori, and after a few weeks was able to preach a simple sermon, and write a Tongan hymn. By the end of the year Nathaniel had prepared an alphabet for the Tongan language, and had a first school book printed in Sydney for the missionaries to use in a school that was set up in March 1828. Numbers at the school rapidly increased, so they used the brighter pupils to teach the youngsters, and books were copied out in longhand. By the end of 1830 there were a thousand attending, and many other Tongans converted to Methodism.

== Mission to China ==
The Wesleyan Missionary Society sent out Revs. W. R. Beach and J. Cox to Guangzhou in 1852. It afterwards established itself in Hankow, and had its principal stations in that city and others of the province of Hupeh. Lay agency, under the direction of Rev. David Hill, was a prominent feature in the Mission at Hankow, and this society was also trying the experiment of giving to some of its missionaries a medical training, that they might combine preaching and healing gifts in their labors. Reverend Doctors Charles Wenyon and Roderick McDonald were chief among these medical missionaries in taking up this call. In 1884 it resolved to open a college or high school in connection with their Central Mission, and the Rev. W. T. A. Barber, M.A., was appointed principal, and arrived at Hankow early in 1885. The object of the institution was to provide a liberal Western education for the sons of official and other wealthy Chinese. Attempts to purchase land for the erection of a suitable building were unsuccessful, but in 1887 a large house was rented in the main street of Wuchang, and the work begun. A ladies' auxiliary society also sent out female workers. In 1890 there were 25 missionaries at work, with six lady agents, two ordained native pastors, 33 unordained native helpers, and 975 communicants.

== See also ==
- Wesleyan Missionary Notices
- List of Protestant missionary societies in China (1807–1953)
- Timeline of Chinese history
- Protestant missions in China
- List of Protestant missionaries in China
- Christianity in China
