= Wesleydale Mission =

Wesleydale
- Interactive map of Wesleydale
- Coordinates: 35°6′S 173°47′E
- Country: New Zealand
- Region: Northland Region
- District: Far North District
- Ward: Bay of Islands-Whangaroa
- Community: Bay of Islands-Whangaroa
- Subdivision: Whangaroa

Wesleydale was the first mission station established in New Zealand by the Wesleyan Missionary Society. Located where the current village of Kaeo sits, some twelve miles to the south east of the Whangaroa Harbour, it was founded in June 1823 by the missionaries Samuel Leigh and William White. The short-lived mission was ransacked by the local Māori on several occasions, until it was comprehensively destroyed in January 1827, and the missionaries were forced to abandon it.

== Background ==
The first Christian mission to New Zealand was by the Anglican Church Mission Society (CMS). The Australia-based CMS preacher Samuel Marsden first attempted to establish a mission in 1809, however it was not until 1814 that the CMS mission in New Zealand was established, when Marsden officiated at its first service on Christmas Day in 1814, at Oihi Bay in the Bay of Islands. Marsden returned to Australia, leaving behind a small group of clergymen and lay settlers.

The Wesleyan Missionary Society (WMS) soon followed the example of their Anglican friends. Samuel Leigh was a WMS missionary working in New South Wales since 1815; by 1818 his health was suffering, and on the advice of Marsden, he took a voyage to New Zealand to visit the CMS Mission in the Bay of Islands. During his short stay, Leigh became convinced that the WMS should also set up a permanent mission station in New Zealand. He returned to England in 1820, where he persuaded the WMS Conference to support this venture. The Conference appointed him as the Wesleyan Missionary to New Zealand, after which he toured the cities of England to collect supplies and funds for the mission.

== Foundation in June 1823 ==
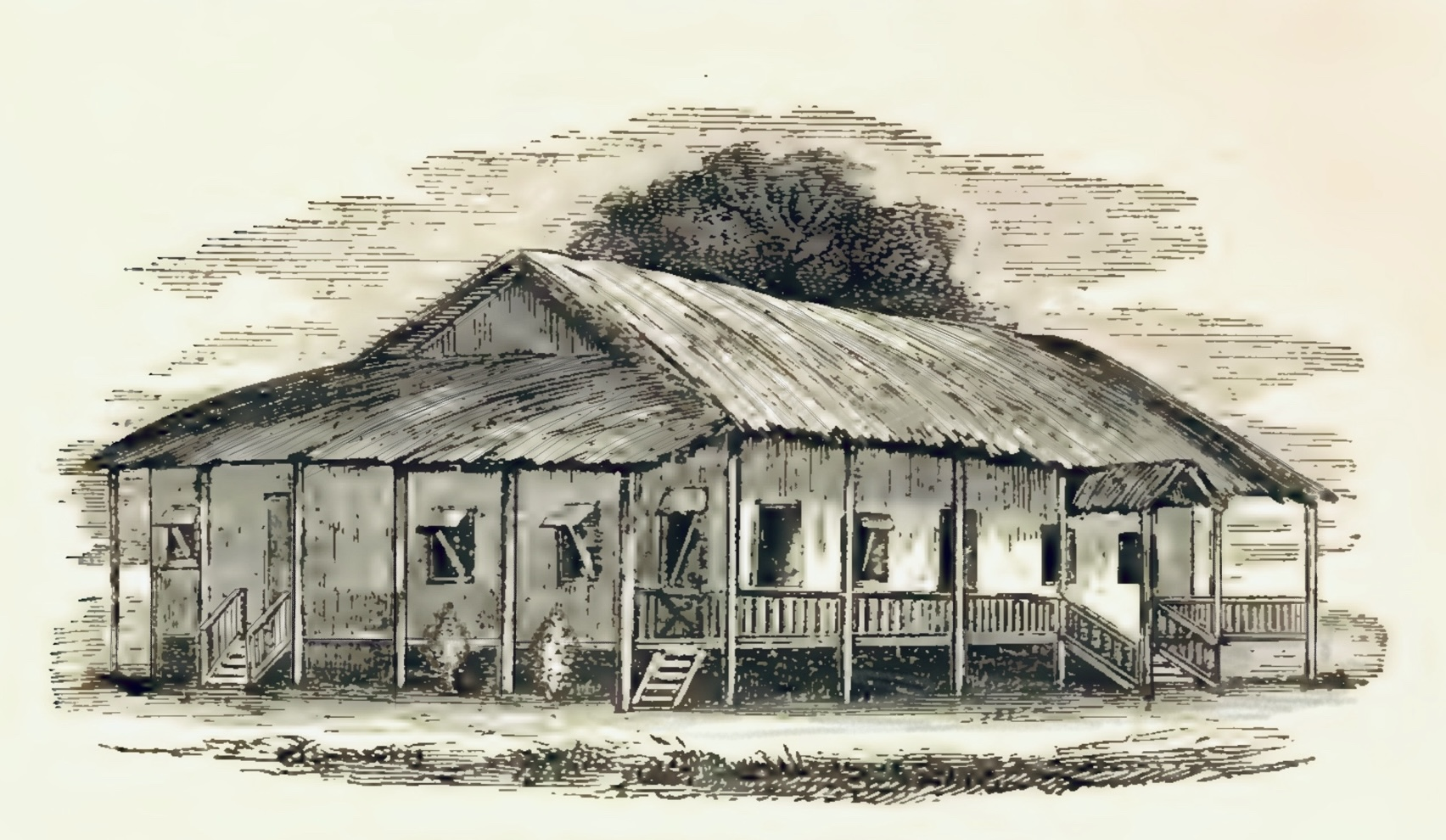
Wesleydale Mission-House and Chapel, circa 1823

Samuel Leigh arrived in the Bay of Islands on 22 February 1822, having sailed with his supplies on Marsden's ship The Active. Leigh stayed at the CMS station for 16 months, learning Māori, until a Wesleyan colleague, William White, arrived in May 1823 to support him. They spent the next month searching the area by boat and overland, to find the optimal site for their Mission. On 11 June they opted for a hillside location twelve miles inland from the southern end of Whangaroa Harbour, at the place where the current village of Kaeo sits, beside the Kaeo River.

== Arrival of Turner and Hobbs in August 1823 ==
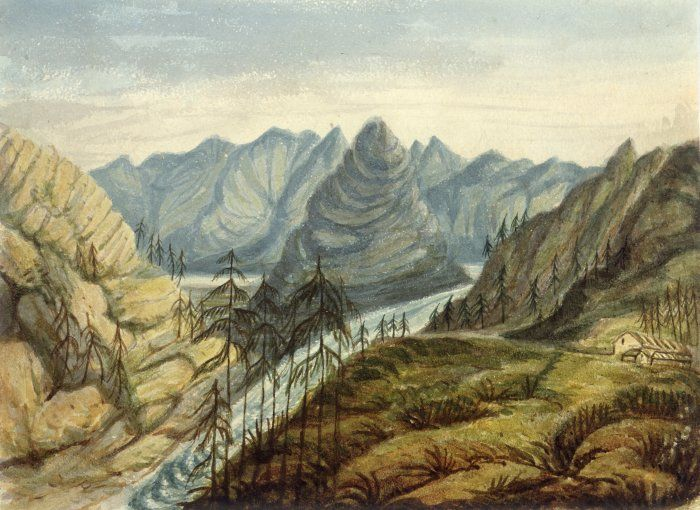
A view, executed by the missionary Daniel Tyerman, of Wesleydale. Its buildings are centre right, overlooking the Kaeo River

In March 1820 the WMS had nominated an additional preacher, Nathaniel Turner, to the New Zealand Mission to support Leigh. He spent the next year fund-raising in England; he was ordained in January 1822, and married Anne née Sargent, before setting sail for Australia in February, along with his new wife and William White.

After a period of time in Hobart, Tasmania, Turner sailed to Sydney, where he joined Marsden and the Wesleyan lay preacher John Hobbs for the crossing to New Zealand, arriving in the Bay of Islands in August 1823. It took Turner and Hobbs three days to locate Wesleydale, trekking overland, before returning by boat, with their supplies, Marsden, Turner's wife and infant daughter. On arrival they found Leigh in very poor health. Marsden persuaded his old friend to return to Sydney for medical help, and they departed Wesleydale three days later.

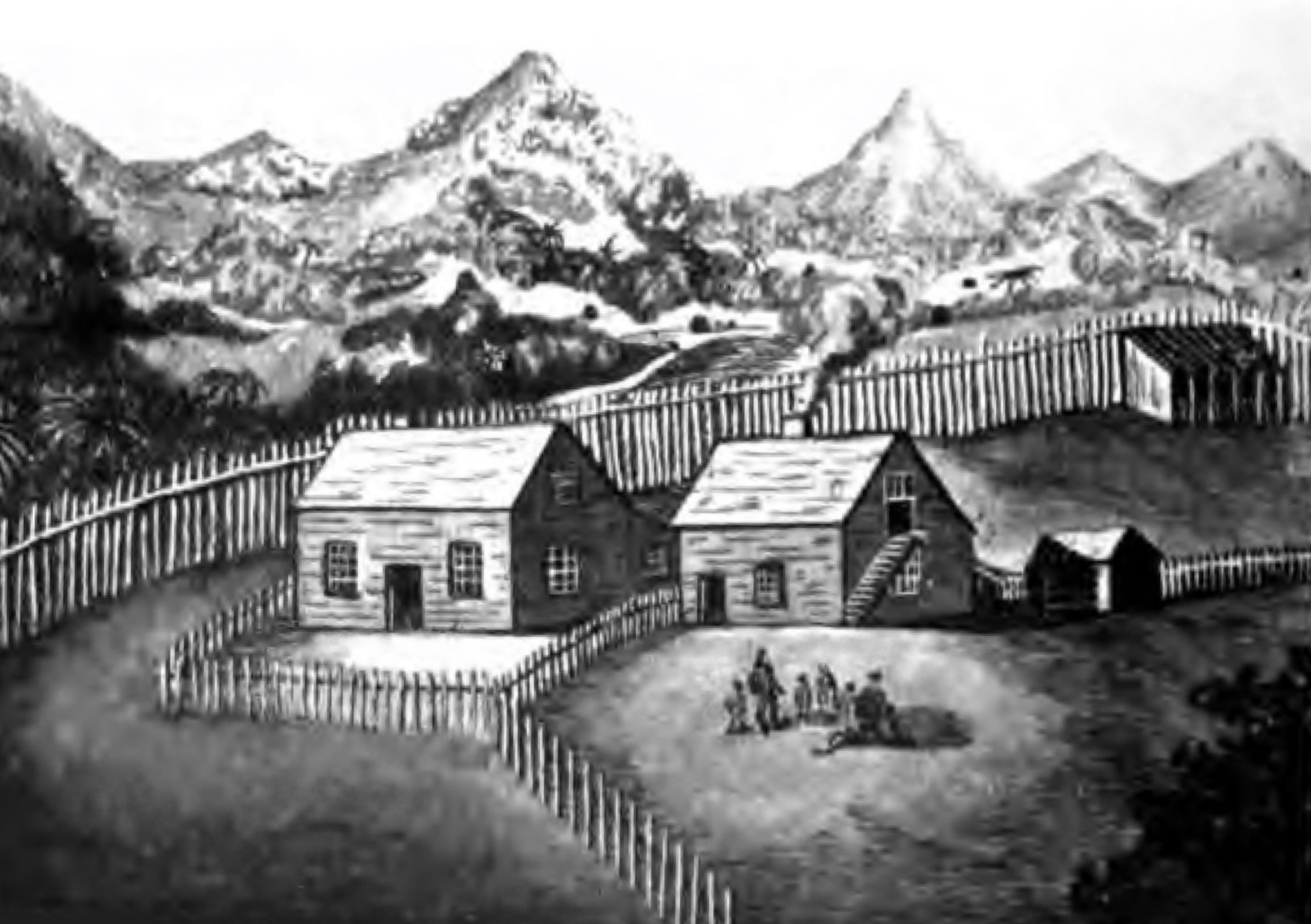
The Mission buildings circa 1826

After Leigh's departure, the Mission station comprised William White; Nathaniel Turner, his wife Anne, their infant daughter and a young nanny, Miss Davies; John Hobbs; James Stack, a Navy veteran who had volunteered to help Leigh in the founding of the Mission; and Luke Wade, a general servant.

== Missionary activity, 1824 - 1825 ==
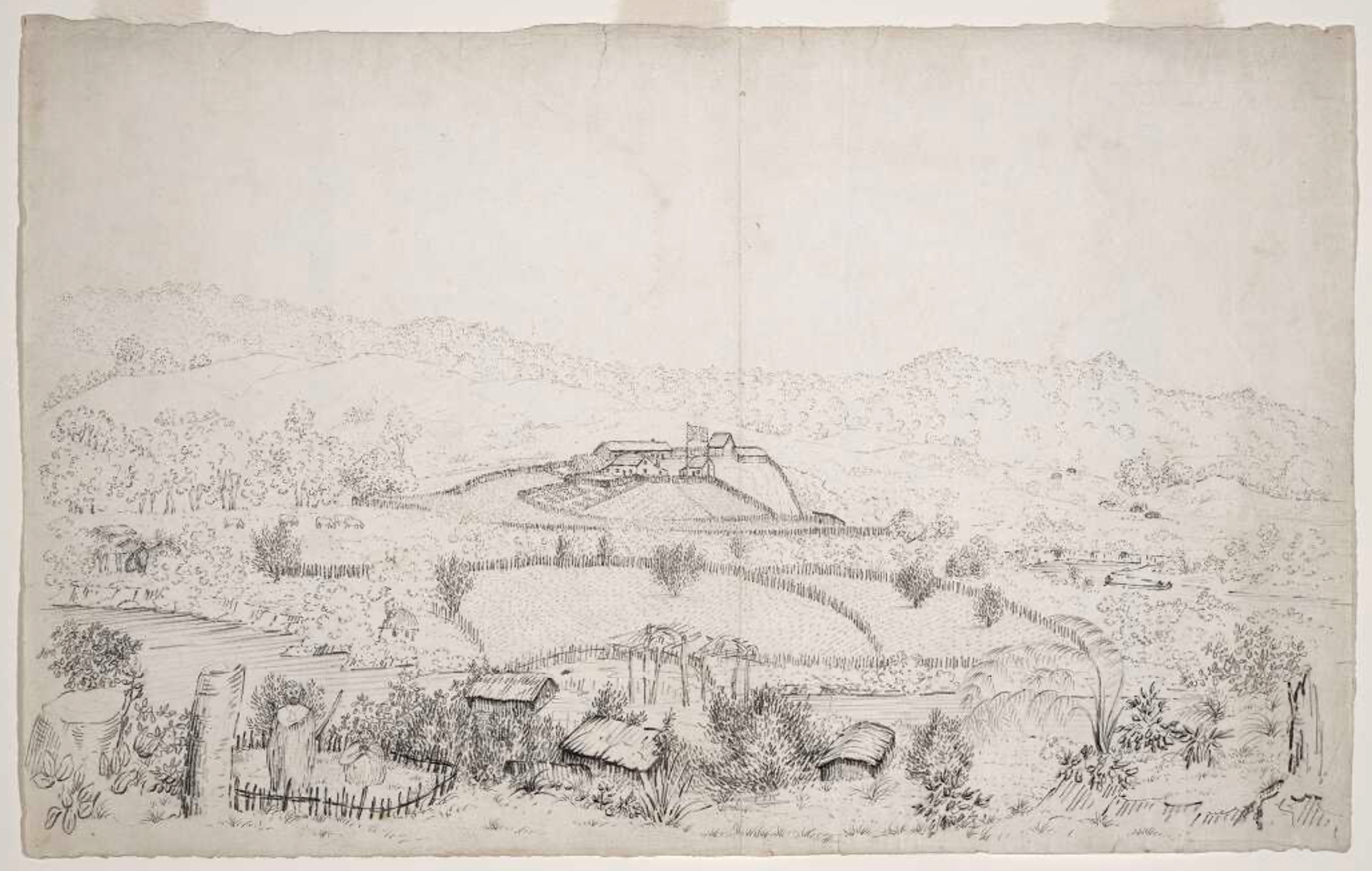
Turner's sketch of the Wesleydale mission, circa 1825

After about six months, the missionaries had built a couple of ‘temporary rough buildings’ to act as schools and chapels in the local villages. These were the first Wesleyan churches built in New Zealand, and were consecrated on 13 June 1824. Fellow missionaries from the CMS stations in Kere Kere and the Bay of Islands attended the consecrations. They taught the local children, up to twenty at a time, and preached to growing congregations; by September 1824 Turner reported he had ‘more than two hundred’ listeners.

== Relationship with local Māori Tribes ==
Wesleydale was in the territory of the Ngāti Uru (or Ngatehure) iwi (or tribe) based in the Whangaroa area. One of the sons of the chief of the tribe, called Te Ara, had been the central figure in the Boyd Massacre. This had occurred in December 1809 when Māori of Ngāti Pou killed and ate between 66 and 70 European crew members from the British brigantine Boyd.

Te Ara was known as George by the crew of the Boyd and by the missionaries of Wesleydale. After the death of his father, Te Ara became the chief of the Ngāti Uruiwi, and periodically threatened the missionaries and pilfered items from the Mission, as did his brother Te Puhi.

By early 1825 the relationship between the missionaries and the local Māori had begun to deteriorate. In March, Turner was attacked and struck unconscious by Te Puhi, and a visiting whaling ship was plundered. In March 1825 Turner temporarily evacuated his wife and young children down to the CMS mission in Kerikeri, some eight hours walk to the south. She returned to Wesleydale a few weeks later, after the death of Te Ara and the anticipated ‘prospect of tranquility’.

Later in 1825 William White left the Mission, to return to England; Rev Turner was then the only recognised ordained Wesleyan missionary in New Zealand. Along with Hobbs and Stack, the three completed the building of further houses, and expanded the area set aside for wheat growing. In May 1825 Anne Turner gave birth to their third child, Nathaniel Bailey, but he was to die eleven months later, and be buried in Wesleydale.

== Arrival of Hongi Hika in 1826 ==
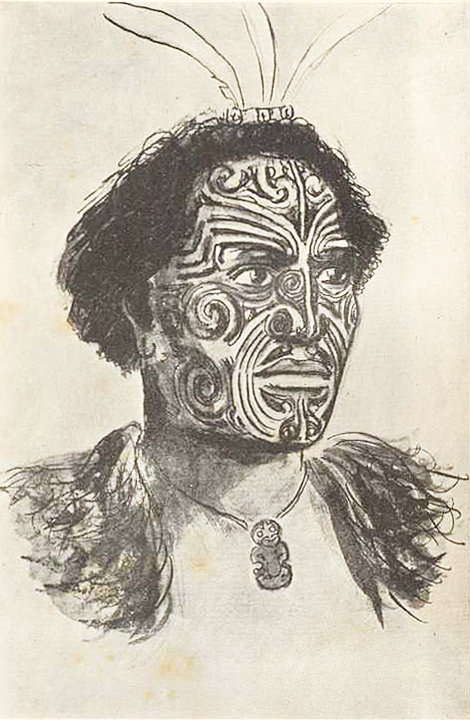
Hongi Hika

Hongi Hika was the rangatira or Chief of the Ngāpuhi people, based at Waimate, 16 miles (26km) to the south of Wesleydale. He was a pivotal figure in the early years of regular European contact and settlement in New Zealand. As one of the first Māori leaders to understand the advantages of European muskets in warfare, he used European weapons to overrun much of northern New Zealand in the early nineteenth century Musket Wars.

He decided to move from Waimate to Whangaroa in 1826, asserting the rights of his father's people. He had, in any case, a number of reasons for taking action against the Ngāti Uru people there, who had constantly harassed the Mission with threats and pilfering. Hongi valued the presence of Europeans; to protect them he decided to punish the Whangaroa people.

== Destruction of Wesleydale, January 1827 ==
In early 1827, Hongi Hika was engaged in warfare against the tribes of Whangaroa. Te Puhi and most of his Ngāti Uru tribe fled the area, in fear of Hongi Hika's superior strength.

Acting contrary to the orders of Hongi Hika, some of his Ngāpuhi warriors plundered Wesleydale on 9 January, breaking into several outhouses. They threatened to return the following day. The Missionaries therefore decided to call for help, sending Stack to make his way overnight to the CMS mission in Kerikeri.

By dawn on 10 January, the warriors returned, and smashed their way into the tool house, store rooms and eventually the main house. The missionaries had no option bu to flee, and abandon Wesleydale. The group set off for the twenty mile walk to the CMS mission in Kerikeri: The Reverend Turner and his wife Anne; their three surviving children Anne (aged 3), Thomas (aged 2) and John Sargent (aged one month); their nanny Miss Davies; John Hobbs; Luke Wade and wife. They were accompanied by five boys and two girls from the Ngāti Uru Māori that had remained with the missionaries.

The group of sixteen walked all day, meeting help coming to their aid from Kerikeri, having been alerted by Stack. Further rescuers came from the CMS station in Paihia, and with their help the missionaries made it to Kerirkeri by 7pm. After a night there, the group moved further from danger, heading by boat to the CMS mission station in Paihia. A few days later, they heard that the Wesleydale mission had been totally destroyed; the buildings burnt, the cattle killed, and the stores of wheat burnt. The Mission party eventually returned to Sydney, leaving New Zealand on 28 January 1827.

== Aftermath ==
Following the failure of this first Wesleyan mission to New Zealand, a second attempt was made in 1828: Hobbs and Stack set up the Māngungu Mission at Hokianga Harbour, on the West side of the Northland peninsula.

The Turners were sent by the WMS to Tonga in October 1827; they did however return to New Zealand in 1836. Based at Mangungu, Nathaniel Turner returned to the site of the Wesleydale station in October 1836. "At his feet was all that remained of his own manual work; a few broken bricks... He sought the spot where his first-gone child had lain. The soil was sunken and disturbed, and told of despoilers’ hands."
