= Mary Bumby =

British missionary and beekeeper (1811–1862)

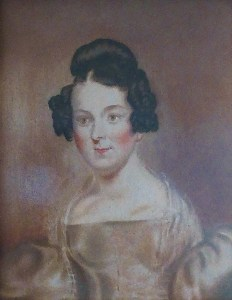
Mary Anna Bumby, circa 1830s by an unknown artist. Collection of the Māngungu Mission House.

Mary Anna Bumby (1811–1862) was a British missionary and beekeeper. She was significant for introducing the first honeybees to New Zealand in March 1839.

== Life ==
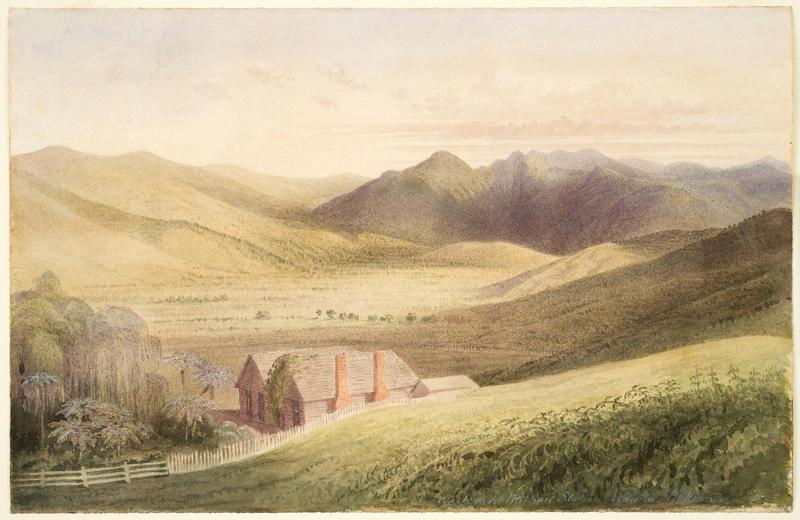
Hokianga Wesleyan Station in 1858

Mary was born in Thirsk, Yorkshire, England in 1811. In 1838, her brother Reverend John Hewgill Bumby (1808–1840) was appointed as superintendent missionary for the Māngungu Mission in New Zealand. Mary decided to accompany him as his housekeeper. They travelled on the vessel the James. They travelled from England via Hobart and it was there that Mary acquired two honeybee skep hives. The book “Mary Bumby’s Bees,1839-1841, Myth Fact Mystery” tells the detailed story. She and her brother arrived in the Hokianga on 13 March 1839 and joined the Methodist Māngungu Mission Station on 19 March 1839. The hives were sited in the Mission churchyard.

After her brother drowned in the Firth of Thames on 24 June 1840, she accepted the proposal of Reverend Gideon Smales and married him in December 1840. They settled in a small house at the Hokianga Wesleyan Station of Pakanae. Subsequently, she and Gideon took up a mission posting in Porirua, and then Aotea Harbour, near Kawhia. In 1856, after Gideon refused to relocate to a mission in Australia, they moved to East Tāmaki, where they established a successful farming enterprise, naming it Hampton Park. They constructed a church on the property called St. John's, with the intention that it be used by all denominations. It is still in use today.

Mary Bumby died in 1862 at sea on a return voyage to England.
