= Wesleyan Missionary Notices =

Periodical for English Methodist missionaries

Wesleyan Missionary Notices was a periodical published by the Wesleyan Methodist Missionary Society (WMMS) starting in the early 19th century. It served as the primary reporting tool for the society's global activities, originally established by leaders like John Wesley, Thomas Coke, and others.

It was published by the Secretaries of the Society, and sold at the Centenary Hall, Bishopsgate-street, and at 66, Paternoster Row, London.

== See also ==
- Methodist Central Hall, Westminster
