= James S. Stack =

American politician

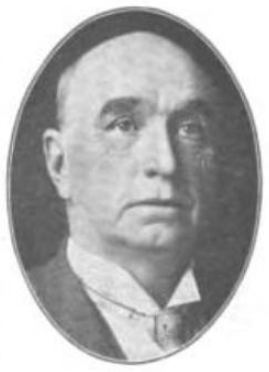

Member of the Wisconsin State Assembly
- In office 1908–1910
- Constituency: Douglas County First District

Personal details
- Born: September 14, 1852 Detroit, Michigan
- Died: December 14, 1920 (aged 68) Hot Springs, Arkansas
- Party: Republican
- Occupation: Judge, hotel owner, politician

James S. Stack (September 14, 1852 – December 14, 1920) was an American judge, hotel owner, and politician.

== Biography ==
Born on a farm near Detroit, Michigan, Stack and his family moved to Ishpeming, Michigan and then to Brown County, Minnesota. In 1873, Stack moved to Fargo, Dakota Territory. He was in the land business, served as deputy United States marshal, and was Fargo municipal judge. In 1887, Stack moved to Superior, Wisconsin and was in the hotel business from 1887 to 1889. He then served as Indian agent in Cloquet, Minnesota from 1889 to 1891. Stack served as under sheriff of Douglas County, Wisconsin. From 1899 to 1903, Stack served as Wisconsin Deputy Railroad Commissioner. He also served as acting judge of the Douglas County municipal court. In 1909, Stack served in the Wisconsin State Assembly and was a Republican. Stack died in Hot Springs, Arkansas in 1920.
