= James West Stack =

New Zealand missionary (1835–1919)

- Born: 27 March 1835; Puriri, New Zealand
- Died: 13 October 1919 (aged 84); Worthing, Sussex, England
- Occupation: Anglican Minister
- Spouse: Eliza Rachel Jane Jones (m. 1861)
- Relatives: James Stack (father)

James West Stack (27 March 1835 – 13 October 1919) was a New Zealand missionary, clergyman, writer and interpreter. He was born at Puriri, Thames/Coromandel, New Zealand, in 1835.

His father, James Stack, had been a Wesleyan missionary at Whangaroa, who later joined the Church Mission Society (CMS), which followed the Anglican traditions. James Stack was sent to the CMS mission in Puriri, where his son was born.

He started at the boys college of St. John Evangelist, Auckland in 1846; then he attended Sydney College (later Sydney Grammar School) from 1847. From 1851 to 1852 he attended Highbury College, London. From 1853 to 1860 he was a teacher at the CMS school at Kohanga Mission of the Rev. Robert Maunsell at the Port Waikato.

He was ordained a deacon on 23 December 1860 at Holy Trinity Church, Lyttelton, and he was appointed to the Diocese of Christchurch at the Tuahiwi mission among the Māori in Canterbury. In 1861, Stack married botanist Elizabeth Jones in Auckland.

He was ordained a priest on 21 December 1862 at Church of St Michael and All Angels, Christchurch. From 1864 to 1879 he worked at the Māori mission at Kaiapoi. From 1880 to 1898 he was appointed to various churches in the Banks Peninsula and Christchurch districts. On 11 September 1894 he was appointed as canon of Christchurch Cathedral.

Throughout his time in New Zealand he travelled widely including as far south as Stewart Island.

In 1898 he retired and went to live with his brother-in-law in Bordighera, Liguria, Italy. From 1907 until his death in 1919 he lived at Worthing, England.

== Publications ==
The following books were written by James West Stack. Some were published posthumously and most are still available in various formats. Some have been later re-published under slightly different titles.

- Stack, James West (1893). Kaiapohia: The Story of a Siege. Christchurch and Dunedin: Whitcombe & Tombs Limited. (Note: Stack was the first to use the name "Kaiapohia" and many subsequent authors copied him. The term is incorrect and an insult to Ngāi Tahu, as it means "the piling up of bodies to eat".)
- Jacobson, Howard Charles; Stack, James West (1884). Stories of Banks Peninsula (1 ed.). Akaroa: H. C. Jacobson, "Mail" Office.
- Jacobson, Howard Charles; Stack, James West (1893). Tales of Banks Peninsula (2 ed.). Akaroa: H. C. Jacobson, "Mail" Office.
- Stack, James West (1898). South Island Maoris: A Sketch of Their History and Legendary Lore. Christchurch: Whitcombe & Tombs Limited.
- Stack, James West (1909). Koro. Christchurch, Wellington, and Dunedin, N.Z. Melbourne and London: Whitcombe & Tombs. Ld. A Maori Churchworker
- Stack, James West (1909). Jacobson, Howard Charles (ed.). Through Canterbury and Otago with Bishop Harper in 1859-60. Akaroa: "Akaroa Mail" Office.
- A White Boy Among Maoris (1934) (autobiography)
- Stack, James West (1935). Reed, Alfred Hamish (ed.). Early Maoriland Adventures of J. W. Stack. Dunedin: A. H. and A. W. Reed.
- Stack, James West (1936). Reed, Alfred Hamish (ed.). More Maoriland Adventures of J. W. Stack. Dunedin: A. H. and A. W. Reed.
- Stack, James West; Stack, Eliza Rachel Jean (1938). Reed, Alfred Hamish (ed.). Further Maoriland Adventures of J. W. and E. Stack. Dunedin: A. H. and A. W. Reed.
- Stack, James West (1969). Family Life in New Zealand, 1840–1850. Wellington: Reed.
- Stack, James West. Letters to My Grandchildren, About My Childhood in New Zealand, 1835–1846.
