= Horeke =

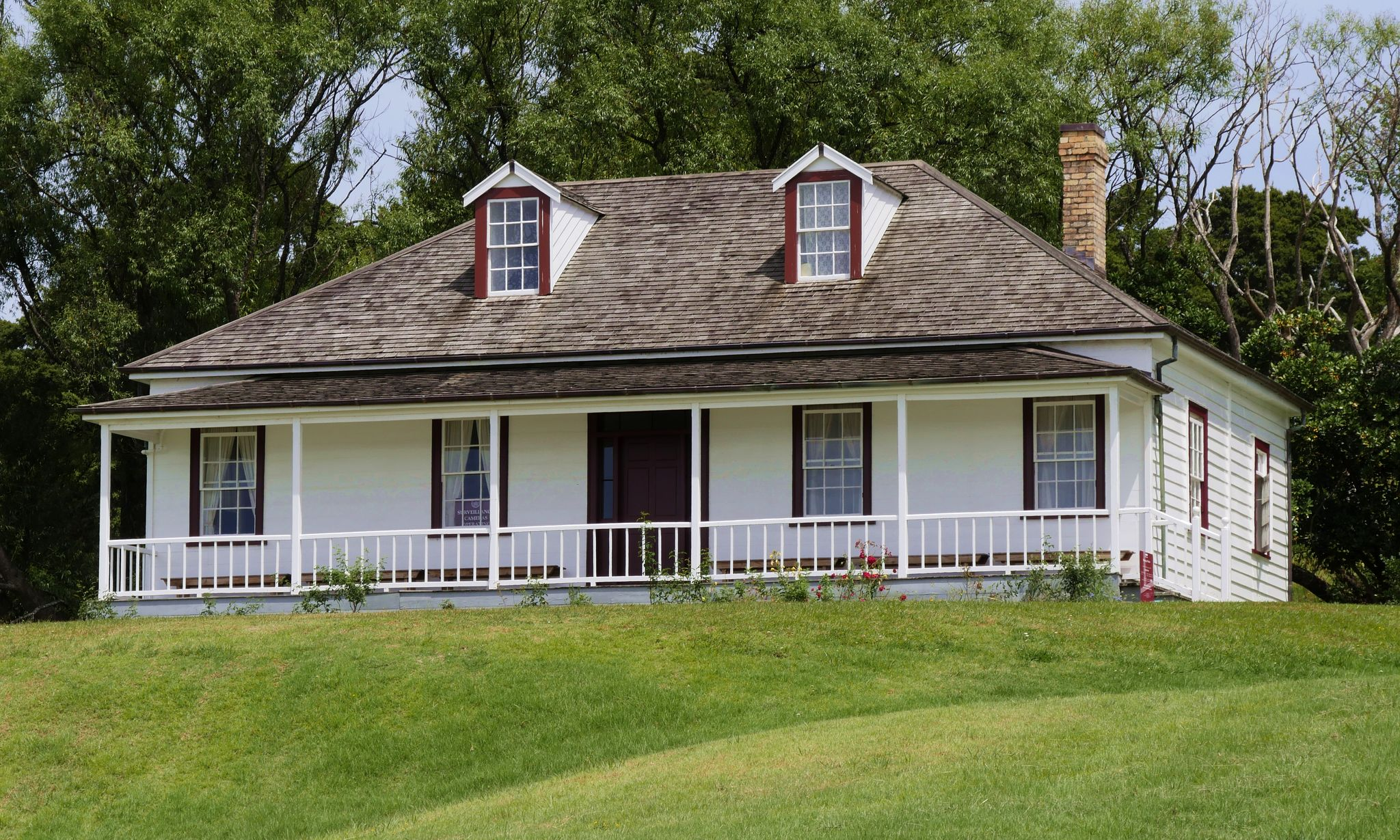
- Māngungu Mission House
- Interactive map of Horeke
- Coordinates: 35°21′23″S 173°35′49″E
- Country: New Zealand
- Region: Northland Region
- District: Far North District
- Ward: Kaikohe/Hokianga
- Community: Kaikohe-Hokianga
- Subdivision: South Hokianga
- Electorates: Northland; Te Tai Tokerau

Government
  - Territorial Authority: Far North District Council
  - Regional council: Northland Regional Council
  - Mayor of Far North: Moko Tepania
  - Northland MP: Grant McCallum
  - Te Tai Tokerau MP: TBD

Area
  - Total: 12.35 km^{2} (4.77 sq mi)

Population (2023 Census)
  - Total: 162
  - Density: 13.1/km^{2} (34.0/sq mi)

Horeke is a settlement in the upper reaches of the Hokianga Harbour in Northland, New Zealand. Kohukohu is just across the harbour. The Horeke basalts are located near the town, and can be viewed on an easy stroll through the Wairere Boulders, a commercial park.

The town is at the western end of the 87 km (54 mi) km (54 mi) Pou Herenga Tai - Twin Coast Cycle Trail from Opua, which opened fully in 2017.

== History and culture ==
=== European settlement ===
A timber mill, shipbuilding yard, trading post and settlement for workers was set up in about 1826 by a partnership of Sydney merchants, namely Gordon D. Browne and the firm of Raine and Ramsay (Thomas Raine and David Ramsay). One of the first European settlements in New Zealand, it was initially called Deptford, after the Royal Navy shipyard of that name in England. David Clarke was in charge of the yard, which employed about 30 Pākehā and 40 Māori ship builders. Three ships were built – the 40-ton schooner Enterprise in 1827, the 140-ton brigantine New Zealander in 1828, and the 394 (or 392)-ton barque Sir George Murray in 1830. The firm went bankrupt in 1830 and the shipyard closed in 1831. Thomas McDonnell Sr. bought the yard and the Sir George Murray in 1831, and his business was the centre of timber trading in the Hokianga in the 1830s.

The Wesleyan missionary John Hobbs opened Māngungu Mission, about a mile from the shipyard, in 1828.

=== Marae ===
Horeke has three Ngāpuhi marae:

- Piki te Aroha or Rāhiri Marae and Whakapono meeting house is a meeting place of Ngāi Tāwake ki te Moana, Ngāi Tāwake ki te Tuawhenua, Ngāti Hao and Ngāti Toro.
- Puketawa Marae is a meeting place of Ngāi Tāwake ki te Moana, Ngāti Hao, Ngāti Toro and Te Honihoni.
- Tauratumaru Marae and Tahere meeting house is a meeting place of Ngāi Tāwake ki te Moana, Ngāti Toro, Tauratumaru, Te Honihoni and Te Popoto.

In October 2020, the Government committed $496,514 to upgrade the Puketawa Marae, creating 22 jobs.

== Demographics ==
The SA1 statistical area which includes Horeke covers 12.35 km^{2} (4.77 sq mi). The SA1 area extends to the Utukura River and Ruapapaka Island, and is part of the larger Omahuta Forest-Horeke statistical area.

Historical population for Horeke and surrounds
Year	Pop.	±% p.a.
2001	171	—
2006	108	−8.78%
2013	114	+0.78%
2018	150	+5.64%
2023	162	+1.55%
Populations before 2013 are for the equivalent meshblock 0022000. Source:

The SA1 statistical area had a population of 162 in the 2023 New Zealand census, an increase of 12 people (8.0%) since the 2018 census, and an increase of 48 people (42.1%) since the 2013 census. There were 81 males, 81 females and 3 people of other genders in 51 dwellings. 1.9% of people identified as LGBTIQ+. The median age was 36.8 years (compared with 38.1 years nationally). There were 39 people (24.1%) aged under 15 years, 30 (18.5%) aged 15 to 29, 75 (46.3%) aged 30 to 64, and 21 (13.0%) aged 65 or older.

People could identify as more than one ethnicity. The results were 31.5% European (Pākehā), 88.9% Māori, 5.6% Pasifika, and 1.9% Asian. English was spoken by 94.4%, Māori language by 33.3%, Samoan by 3.7% and other languages by 3.7%. New Zealand Sign Language was known by 1.9%. The percentage of people born overseas was 7.4, compared with 28.8% nationally.

Religious affiliations were 33.3% Christian, and 16.7% Māori religious beliefs. People who answered that they had no religion were 42.6%, and 9.3% of people did not answer the census question.

Of those at least 15 years old, 3 (2.4%) people had a bachelor's or higher degree, 66 (53.7%) had a post-high school certificate or diploma, and 51 (41.5%) people exclusively held high school qualifications. The median income was $23,200, compared with $41,500 nationally. The employment status of those at least 15 was that 27 (22.0%) people were employed full-time, 12 (9.8%) were part-time, and 12 (9.8%) were unemployed.

=== Omahuta Forest-Horeke ===
Omahuta Forest-Horeke covers the upper Hokianga Harbour. It has an area of 463.71 km^{2} (179.04 sq mi) and had an estimated population of 1,190 as of June 2025, with a population density of 2.6 people per km^{2}.

Historical population for Omahuta Forest-Horeke
Year	Pop.	±% p.a.
2006	1,017	—
2013	888	−1.92%
2018	1,056	+3.53%
2023	1,143	+1.60%

Omahuta Forest-Horeke had a population of 1,143 in the 2023 New Zealand census, an increase of 87 people (8.2%) since the 2018 census, and an increase of 255 people (28.7%) since the 2013 census. There were 567 males, 564 females and 9 people of other genders in 387 dwellings. 1.8% of people identified as LGBTIQ+. The median age was 41.5 years (compared with 38.1 years nationally). There were 255 people (22.3%) aged under 15 years, 183 (16.0%) aged 15 to 29, 504 (44.1%) aged 30 to 64, and 198 (17.3%) aged 65 or older.

People could identify as more than one ethnicity. The results were 53.3% European (Pākehā), 67.5% Māori, 6.8% Pasifika, 2.1% Asian, and 1.6% other, which includes people giving their ethnicity as "New Zealander". English was spoken by 96.3%, Māori language by 21.5%, Samoan by 1.0% and other languages by 3.1%. No language could be spoken by 1.8% (e.g. too young to talk). New Zealand Sign Language was known by 0.3%. The percentage of people born overseas was 8.4, compared with 28.8% nationally.

Religious affiliations were 30.7% Christian, 12.1% Māori religious beliefs, 0.3% Buddhist, 0.5% New Age, and 0.8% other religions. People who answered that they had no religion were 46.5%, and 9.4% of people did not answer the census question.

Of those at least 15 years old, 63 (7.1%) people had a bachelor's or higher degree, 510 (57.4%) had a post-high school certificate or diploma, and 291 (32.8%) people exclusively held high school qualifications. The median income was $26,300, compared with $41,500 nationally. 27 people (3.0%) earned over $100,000 compared to 12.1% nationally. The employment status of those at least 15 was that 330 (37.2%) people were employed full-time, 117 (13.2%) were part-time, and 66 (7.4%) were unemployed.

== Education ==
Horeke School is a coeducational contributing primary (years 1-8) school which had a roll of 29 students as of July 2026. The school was established in 1920.
