= Samuel Leigh (missionary) =

New Zealand missionary

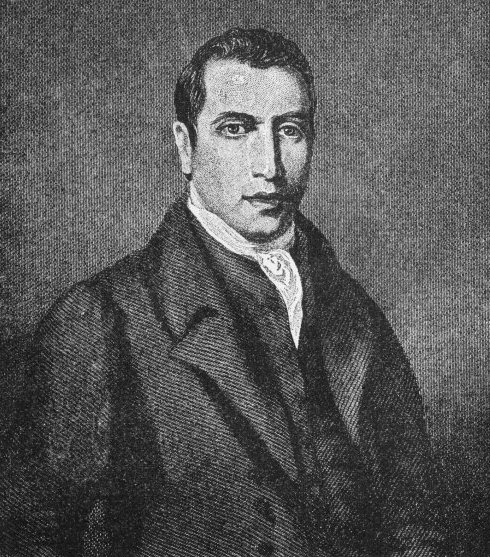
- Leigh in 1831
- Born: 1 September 1785; Milton, Staffordshire, England
- Died: 2 May 1852 (aged 66); Reading, England
- Occupations: Missionary; Minister

Samuel Leigh (1 September 1785 – 2 May 1852) was a prominent minister and missionary for the Wesleyan Methodist Church in early colonial New South Wales and New Zealand.

Born in England, he went to Australia in 1815 and established the first Wesleyan circuit in New South Wales. He first visited New Zealand in 1819 at the behest of Samuel Marsden. After that visit, he went back to England and proposed the establishment of a Wesleyan Missionary Society (WMS) mission for the Māori people of the country. Newly married, he returned to New Zealand in 1822 to establish the first WMS mission there, at Kaeo, near Whangaroa Harbour. He left in August 1823 on account of his poor health and returned to Sydney where he worked in the Australian ministry, until 1831, the year that his wife died. He returned to England the following year, working in the ministry there for the next several years and remarrying. He retired in 1845 and moved to Reading, where he died on 2 May 1852 at the age of 66.

== Early life ==
Born in Milton, in the Staffordshire county of England, on 1 September 1785, Samuel Leigh was the son of an engineer, Matthew Leigh. His education was limited and he was raised in the Congregational church. Desiring to become a minister, he trained at a seminary at Gosport, under David Bogue. Disagreeing with the severe Calvinistic teachings of Bogue, he decided to become a minister of the Wesleyan Methodist Church. Initially an assistant to the Reverend Joseph Sutcliffe at Portsmouth, he spent two years on the Shaftesbury circuit before he was ordained in 1814. He intended to perform missionary work of behalf of the Wesleyan Missionary Society (WMS). He was selected to go to Montreal in Canada, in response to a request from missionaries there. This was then canceled and Leigh was instead dispatched to New South Wales, in Australia, in February 1815.

== Service in Australia ==
On 10 August 1815, Leigh arrived in Sydney aboard the Hebe. He initially began preaching at the Rocks, where there was already a Wesleyan presence. He soon moved to a rural location, at Castlereagh, and by 1817, the first Methodist church in Australia had been built there with Leigh opening it in October that year. Further religious facilities were opened in the locations of Parramatta, Liverpool and at Windsor; at the latter, he laid the first foundation stone to commence the construction of a chapel there. By March 1819, a total of 14 institutions had been built and this constituted the first Methodist circuit in Australia. To traverse it would take Leigh three weeks, covering 241 kilometres (150 mi). He was also instrumental in the foundation of the Colonial Auxiliary Bible Society.

The chaplain of New South Wales was Samuel Marsden, who became close friends with Leigh. When Leigh became ill in 1819, Marsden facilitated a visit for him to New Zealand to help with his recuperation. He was hosted by the Church Missionary Society (CMS) in the Bay of Islands. The members of the CMS were at odds in the running of their activities and Leigh suggested they base their activities upon the circuit model, similar to that used in the Wesleyan mission in Australia. Leigh also thought that the WMS should establish its own mission for the local Māori.

In 1820, Leigh returned to England and began advocating for a WMS mission in New Zealand and other areas of the South Pacific. After promising to acquire the funding himself, he was consequently appointed to take charge of a proposed mission in New Zealand; other missionaries were to be dispatched to Tasmania and Tonga, and he was to be "General Superintendent of Missions to New Zealand and the Friendly Islands" (the latter being a common name for Tonga at the time). In the interim, he married Catherine née Clowes in a ceremony at Hanley in Staffordshire on 14 December 1820.

== Service in New Zealand ==
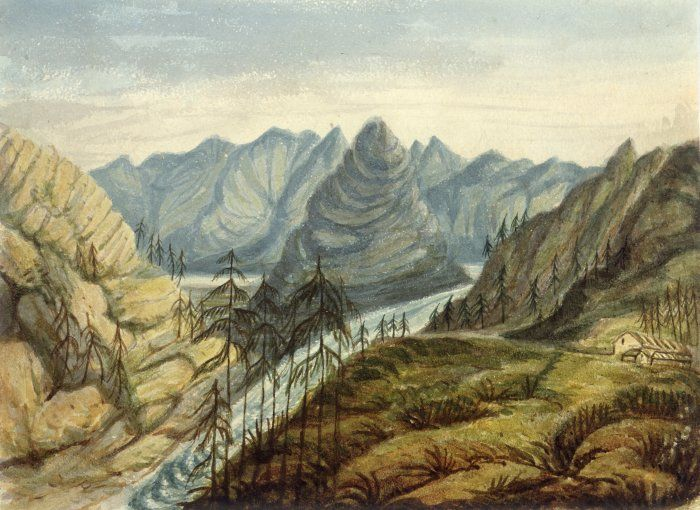
A view, executed by the missionary Daniel Tyerman, of Wesley-Dale, the WMS mission established at Kaeo in 1823 by Leigh and William White. Its buildings are centre right, overlooking the Kaeo River

The following year, along with William Horton, another WMS missionary, Leigh sailed with his wife for Tasmania. On arrival he established a WMS mission at Hobart before going onto Sydney in September 1821, leaving the Tasmanian mission in the care of Horton. He departed for New Zealand on 1 January 1822 on Marsden's ship, the Active, with a store of trade goods for establishing the mission.

Once there, Leigh based himself at the Bay of Islands where he stayed with William Hall, a CMS missionary, and his wife and focussed on learning the Māori language for the next several months. He had been ordered to wait for other WMS missionaries to join him before commencing the establishment of his mission. Following the arrival of William White in May 1823, the two set about selecting a site for their mission. They settled upon a location at Kaeo, near Whangaroa Harbour, which they named Wesley-Dale.

The local iwi (tribes) were Ngāti Pou and Ngāti Uru, some of whom had been among those Māori that had been involved in the murder of the crew of the Boyd some years previously and, fearing potential repercussions, met the missionaries with a degree of hostility. Leigh won them over and the construction of the mission commenced, the missionaries initially living in tents. However, once established, the mission was not particularly successful with few Māori being converted. This was a key task for the WMS missionaries but Leigh's limited ability to converse in the local language compromised this work, while White's bad temper often affected relationships with the local rangatira (chiefs). Other missionaries considered both men to be "mentally unbalanced".

The mission was ransacked by the local Māori on several occasions and Leigh's health soon deteriorated. When Marsden visited in August 1823, he convinced Leigh to seek medical treatment in Sydney. The following month he left with Marsden aboard the Brampton but the vessel run aground near Moturoa in the Bay of Islands. The passengers were rescued and the trip to Sydney resumed in November. The mission at Kaeo was later abandoned after it was sacked by the Māori.

== Later life ==
In Sydney, Leigh's health was still not robust but he soon became involved with the Methodist circuit in Sydney, temporarily acting as its superintendent for a time. He later worked on the Parramatta circuit. His wife died on 15 May 1831 and the following year, Leigh returned to England. He acted as a minister in Liverpool for a time before moving to Gravesend and working on various circuits. He married Elizabeth Kaye, the widow of a fellow Wesleyan minister, in August 1842.

In 1845 Leigh retired from the Wesleyan ministry but remained involved in church affairs. He corresponded with WMS missionaries in the field and lectured around the country on missionary work. He travelled extensively and at one stage, in 1849, he estimated that he had covered 2,400 kilometres (1,500 mi) in a period of just 14 weeks, attending 50 meetings and preaching on 30 occasions. He and his wife had relocated to Reading and on 24 November 1851 he suffered a stroke. He died the following year, on 2 May. He was survived by his second wife, and the couple's two adopted children.

== Legacy ==
The settlement of Leigh, to the north of Auckland, New Zealand, is named for him. He is also remembered in New South Wales, through the naming of the Leigh Memorial Centenary Church, in Parramatta, and the Leigh Theological College, in Enfield.
