= John Hobbs (missionary) =

English missionary in New Zealand (1800–1883)

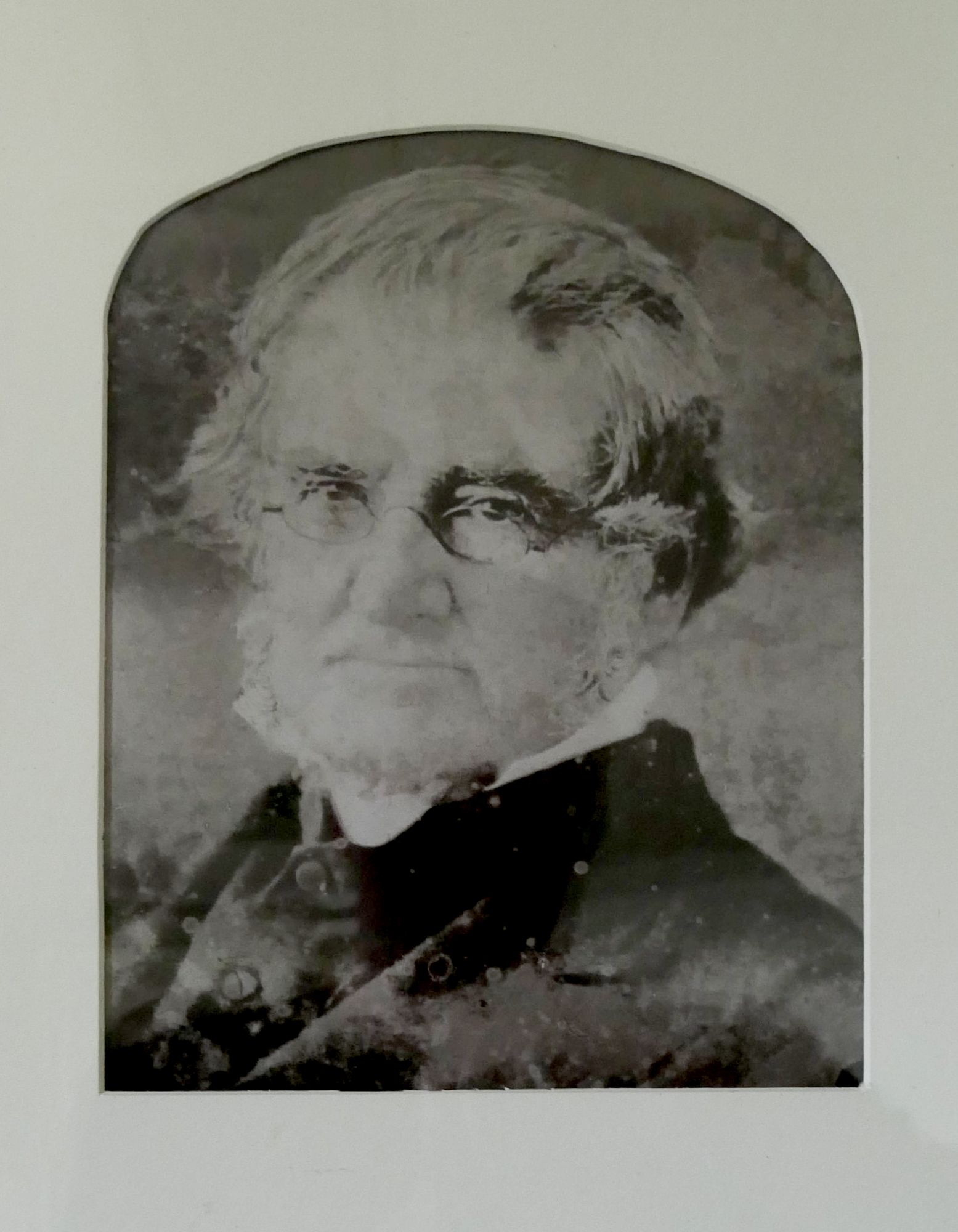
Photograph of Hobbs displayed at Māngungu Mission House

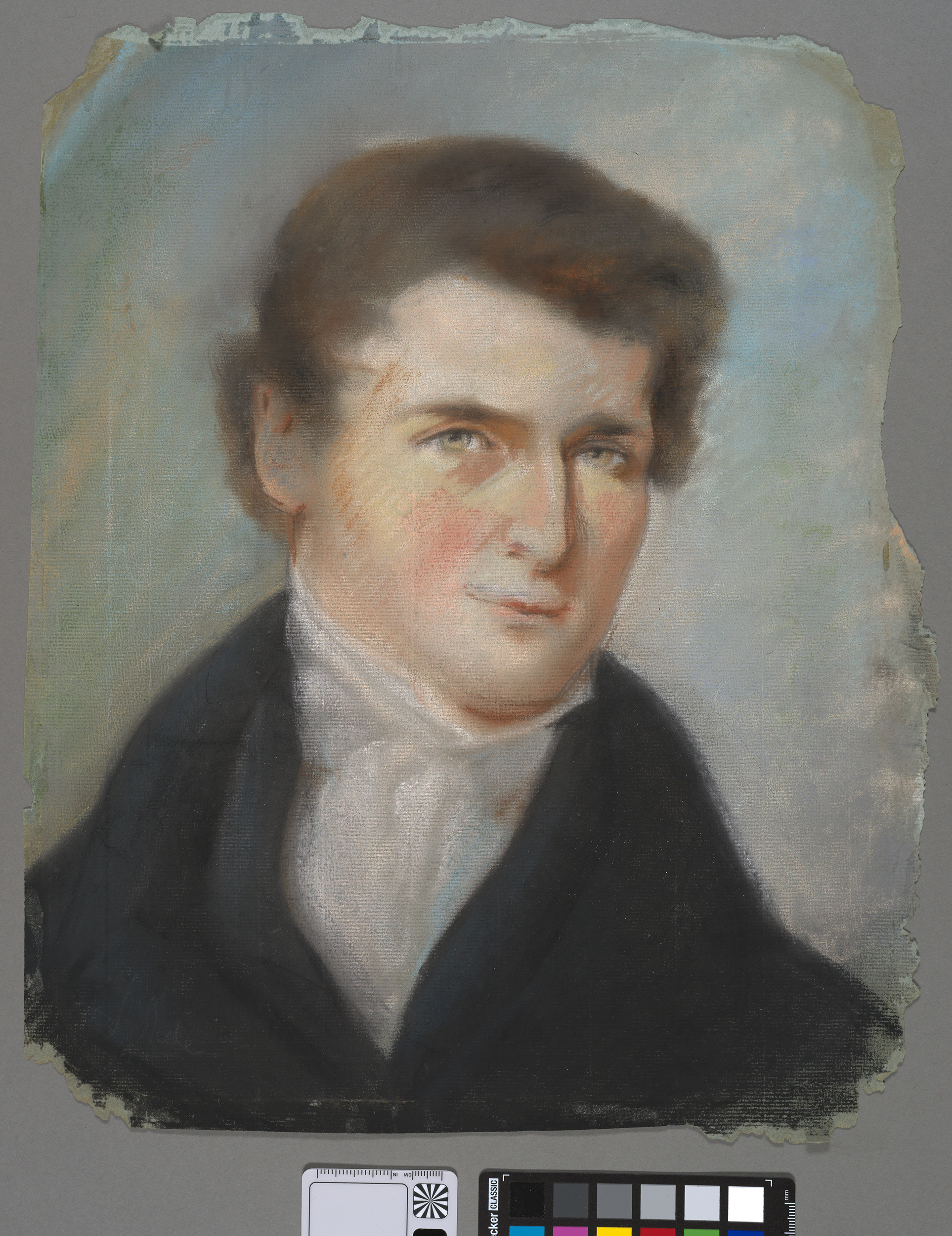
Pastel portrait of Hobbs by Louis John Steele

John Hobbs (22 February 1800 – 24 June 1883) was an English missionary, artisan and interpreter. Along with James Stack, he co-founded the Māngungu Mission in New Zealand.

== Early life ==
John Hobbs was born in Thanet, Kent, England, on 22 February 1800. He was the son of Richard Hobbs, a coachbuilder and Wesleyan preacher.

== Missionary work ==
In 1816, John Hobbs joined the Wesleyan Church. He became a lay preacher, like his father, three years later. At the end of 1822, Hobbs emigrated to Van Dieman's land in Tasmania, Australia to do missionary work among the convicts. Shortly after his arrival in 1823, however, he was persuaded to offer his services to the New Zealand Mission instead. He arrived in Paihia, New Zealand, on 3 August 1823, along with the Rev. Nathaniel Turner, and proceeded to begin his mission at Wesleydale, the Wesleyan mission at Kaeo.

Hobbs' ability to communicate with the Māori people in their tongue made him popular amongst the Māori population and became "unofficial counsellor to several influential chiefs". Even with Hobbs' help, the Ngati Pou chief of Whangaroa, Te Ara (George), found it difficult to protect the mission in Wesleydale. After Te Ara's death in 1827, the missionaries in the area were forced to flee to the Bay of Islands after hostile natives attacked the station. Hobbs returned to Sydney, Australia, and was ordained.

Wesleyan authorities in Sydney were unwilling to abandon their missionary efforts in New Zealand, and established a new mission in the Hokianga district where thriving European businesses already existed. They placed Hobbs in charge of establishing the new station, and he arrived with an advance party in Hokianga on 31 October 1827. He helped establish Māngungu Mission, near Horeke. He spent five years in Tonga, from 1833 to 1838, then returned to Mangungu.

In 1848, Hobbs assisted his son-in-law in establishing a new mission station at Pipiriki in the Wanganui district. On the way, the ship Hobbs was travelling on was wrecked in a storm, and from the experience, Hobbs became deafened which later made him incapable of active duty. He spent the years 1855–1856 resting at the Three Kings institution, and then retired from the mission.

== Personal life ==
In 1827 he married Jane Broggreff of Kent. They had five daughters and two sons. One of his sons was MP Richard Hobbs. He died in 1883 in Auckland and was buried in Grafton Cemetery.

== Legacy ==
John Hobbs was greatly admired for his versatility in mechanical matters. He was called upon to tend to the sick, and his relationship with the Maori population was relatively successful due to his ability to speak their language fluently. He assisted in translating the Book of Job into Māori and was one of the three members on the committee that revised Robert Maunsell's translation of the Old Testament into Māori.
