= James Stack (missionary) =

English missionary in New Zealand (1801–1883)

- Born: 1 September 1801; Portsmouth, England
- Died: 18 April 1883 (aged 81); Barnsbury, England
- Occupations: Anglican minister and missionary
- Spouse: Mary West (died 1850)
- Relatives: James West Stack (son)

James Stack (1 September 1801 – 18 April 1883) was a Wesleyan Methodist missionary at Kaeo, New Zealand, in the 19th century. He later became an Anglican missionary and a member of the Church Missionary Society (CMS). In 1827, he experienced the Wesleydale Methodist Mission being ransacked by warriors of the Ngāpuhi iwi (tribe). In the late 1830s, he worked with other CMS missionaries in Te Papa Mission at Tauranga, after a war party led by Te Waharoa, the leader of the Ngāti Hauā, attacked neighbouring tribes in Rotorua and Tauranga. He later worked with William Williams in the mission to the Māori of the Gisborne District.

== Early years ==
Stack entered the Royal Navy at the age of nine and served in the Napoleonic Wars until being discharged in 1815. Thereafter he spent three and a half years in Ireland with his family. Stack emigrated with an elder brother to New South Wales where he was employed as a store-keeper on a farm owned by John Macarthur. In 1820 he spent eleven months at sea on the Sloop H.M.S. Bathurst (Capt. Phillip Parker King). The vessel was engaged in an official survey of Torres Strait, the Dampier Archipelago and a circumnavigation of the coast of Australia to map places not already examined by Capt. Matthew Flinders, RN, (1774–1814). Stack was "the butt of ridicule" for not conforming to "the sinful taste of my corrupt and depraved equals"; even "a gay young officer" passed his "wicked jokes" about Stack's reading the Scriptures. Stack then offered himself for the Wesleyan mission in New Zealand.

== Wesleyan mission at Whangaroa ==
Stack arrived in Whangaroa Harbour in the St. Michael in February 1823. He worked at Wesleydale, the Wesleyan mission at Kaeo, which is inland from the Whangaroa Harbour.

In 1826 Hongi Hika, a Māori rangatira (chief) and war leader of the Ngāpuhi iwi (tribe), moved to conquer Whangaroa. On 10 January 1827, a party of his warriors, without his knowledge, ransacked Wesleydale. Stack, Turner, Hobbs and the other missionaries sought refuge with the CMS missionaries in Paihia and the mission station was abandoned.

Stack left for Sydney, then he returned to New Zealand and arrived in Paihia on 8 October 1827 on the Herald. Later in 1827, Stack worked with John Hobbs, to establish the Māngungu Mission, in the Hokianga.

== Church Missionary Society ==
Stack returned to England, leaving New Zealand on 17 September 1831 on the Elizabeth. He married Mary West on 6 November 1833. He joined the CMS and returned to New Zealand in 1834. In 1835 Stack was sent to the mission at Puriri in the Thames area, where his son James West Stack was born.

Trouble with the Māori caused his transfer to the Bay of Islands where he remained, until in late 1837 Stack reopened the Te Papa Mission at Tauranga, together with the Rev. A. N. Brown and John Alexander Wilson. The mission had been closed in March 1836 following a war party led by Te Waharoa, the leader of the Ngāti Hauā iwi, arriving at Tauranga.

In January 1838, Stack walked from East Cape to Tūranga, Poverty Bay with William Colenso, Richard Matthews and William Williams. In 1839 Stack and his wife Mary joined William Williams at the Tūranga Mission in Poverty Bay. In 1841, he was again at the Te Papa Mission in Tauranga. From 1842 to 1846 he was at the Rangitukia Mission, which was located 10 km (6.2 mi) south of East Cape, close to the mouth of the Waiapu River.

He retired from the CMS in 1847 because of ill-health, both physical and mental, as his sanity had collapsed. Stack and his family spend time in Sydney, before travelled back to England, where they arrived in May 1848. He died at Barnsbury on 18 April 1883.
