= Eliza (given name) =

- Pronunciation: UK: /ɪˈlaɪzə/ US: /əˈlaɪzə/
- Gender: Female

Origin
- Meaning: diminutive of Elizabeth

Other names
- Related names: Elisa, Élise, Elizabeth, Elle, Ellie, Lisa, Liza, Elissa, Elza, Aliza

Eliza is a female given name in English, meaning "pledged to God" or "joyful."

== Etymology ==
The name first developed as a diminutive of Elizabeth in the 16th century and its use as an independent name started in the 18th century. The name Elizabeth has been around since the Middle Ages, mainly popularised by the French (using the spelling Elisabeth). Elizabeth with a "z" is the typical spelling in English. Elizabeth is found in the Bible (Luke 1:57) as the mother of John the Baptist. Elizabeth became popularised during the late medieval period as a given name, mostly influenced by two saints: St. Elizabeth of Hungary and St. Elizabeth of Portugal. It was brought to England by the French, and the English can be credited with the formation of Eliza as a hypocorism (the French use Élise).

It may also be used as a variant of the Hebrew name Aliza, עַלִיזָה meaning "joyful".

== People with this name ==
- Eliza Acton (1799–1859), English food writer and poet
- Eliza Agnew (1807–1883), American Christian missionary
- Eliza Bushyhead Alberty, Cherokee educator and businesswoman
- Eliza Allen Starr (1824–1901), American artist, art critic, teacher/ and lecturer
- Eliza Crosby Allen (1803–1848), American journal editor
- Eliza Frances Andrews (1840–1931), American writer, botanist/ and teacher
- Eliza Jane Ashley (1917–2020), American cook and author
- Eliza Ashton (1851–1900), Australian journalist, literary critic and social reformer
- Eliza Ashurst Bardonneau, English translator and activist
- Eliza Atkins Gleason (1909–2009), African-American librarian
- Eliza Ault-Connell (born 1981), Australian wheelchair racer
- Eliza Banchuk (born 2007), Israeli world champion rhythmic gymnast
- Eliza Barchus (1857–1959), American painter
- Eliza Bennett (born 1992), English actress
- Eliza Bennis (1725–1802), Irish Methodist leader
- Eliza Bent (born 1982), American playwright, performer, and journalist
- Eliza Berkeley (1734–1800), English author
- Eliza Białkowska (born 1973), Polish rhythmic gymnast
- Eliza Biscaccianti (1824–1896), American actress
- Eliza Violet Blair, American newspaperwoman and political hostess
- Eliza Cooper Blaker (1854–1926), American educator
- Eliza Bostock (1817–1898), British promoter of women's education
- Eliza Jane Gillett Bridgman (1805–1871), American missionary
- Eliza Brightwen (1830–1906), Scottish naturalist
- Eliza Bromley (1784–1807), English novelist and translator
- Eliza Ann Brown (1847–1923), New Zealand activist
- Eliza Brown (1903–1983), American blues singer and recording artist
- Eliza Brown (settler), Australian settler
- Eliza Buceschi (born 1993), Romanian handball player
- Eliza Howard Sims Burd, American philanthropist
- Eliza Mary Burgess (1878–1961), British artist
- Eliza Boardman Burnz (1823–1903), American shorthand inventor and promoter
- Eliza Marian Butler (1885–1959), English scholar of German; linguist and intellectual historian
- Eliza Butterworth (born 1993), British actress
- Eliza Byard (born 1968), American film producer
- Eliza Campbell (born 1995), Australian football player
- Eliza Carthy (born 1975), English folk musician
- Eliza Jane Cate (1812–1884), American author
- Eliza M. Chandler White, American charity work leader
- Eliza Chester, English actress
- Eliza Chulkhurst (1100–34 or 1500–34), conjoined twin
- Eliza Clark, multiple people
- Eliza Clívia (1979–2017), Brazilian singer
- Eliza Dorothea Cobbe, Lady Tuite (1764–1850), Irish author and poet
- Eliza Archard Conner (1838–1912), American journalist, lecturer, feminist
- Eliza Cook (1818–1889), English author and poet
- Eliza Cook (physician) (1856–1947), American physician and suffragist
- Eliza Coupe (born 1981), American actress
- Eliza Courtney (1792–1859), daughter of Charles Grey, 2nd Earl Grey
- Eliza Cowie (1835–1902), New Zealand church and community worker
- Eliza S. Craven Green (1803–1866), English poet, writer and actress
- Eliza Crisp (1822–1873), American actress
- Eliza Cummings (born 1991), English model
- Eliza Lanesford Cushing (1794–1886), American novelist
- Eliza Davis (1866–1931), English fashion writer and gossip columnist
- Eliza Van Benthuysen Davis (1811–1863), letter writer and wife of American politician and plantation owner Joseph Emory Davis
- Eliza Doddridge (born 1999), Australian cricketer
- Eliza B. K. Dooley, American government official
- Eliza Doolittle (singer) (born 1988 as Eliza Sophie Caird), British singer
- Eliza Douglas, American painter
- Eliza Draper (1744–1778), British writer
- Eliza T. Dresang (1941–2014), American professor of Library Science
- Eliza Bisbee Duffey (1838–1898), American painter, author, newspaper editor and printer, spiritualist and feminist
- Eliza Hamilton Dunlop (1796–1880), Irish-Australian poet and songwriter
- Eliza Ann Dupuy (ca. 1814–1880), American author
- Eliza Dushku (born 1980), American actress
- Eliza Edwards (1779–1846), English computer
- Eliza Farnham (1815–1864), American novelist
- Eliza Ware Farrar (1791–1870), American writer
- Eliza Fay (1756–1816), English writer on India
- Eliza Fenwick (1797–1840), English author and children's writer
- Eliza de Feuillide (1761–1813), English sister-in-law of Jane Austen
- Eliza Ann Fewings (1857–1940), Australian and Wales-based school teacher
- Elizabeth Field (author) (1804–1890), English-born Canadian writer and artist
- Eliza Riddle Field (1812–1871), American stage actress
- Eliza Fletcher (1770–1858), English autobiographer and travel writer
- Eliza Flower (1803–1846), British musician and composer
- Eliza Lee Cabot Follen (1787–1860), American writer, editor, abolitionist
- Eliza Forlonge (1784–1859), Australian merino importer
- Eliza Foster, British translator and art writer
- Eliza Bridell Fox (1824–1903), British painter
- Eliza Fraser (c.1798–1858), Scottish woman after whom Fraser Island in Australia is named
- Eliza Nelson Fryer, American educator and missionary
- Eliza Gaffney, Australian rower
- Eliza Gamble (1841–1920), American writer
- Eliza Gardiner (1871–1955), American artist
- Eliza Ann Gardner (1831–1922), African-American abolitionist, religious leader and women's movement leader
- Eliza Garth (born 1954), American concert pianist and recording artist
- Eliza George (1808–1865), American Civil War nurse
- Eliza Gilkyson (born 1950), American musical artist
- Eliza Maria Gordon-Cumming, Scottish aristocrat, horticulturalist, and paleontologist
- Eliza Grant, African American midwife
- Eliza Pratt Greatorex (1819–1897), Irish-American painter
- Eliza Standerwick Gregory (1840–1932), British botanist
- Eliza Ann Grier (1864–1902), American physician
- Eliza Grigg (born 1996), New Zealand alpine skier
- Eliza Griswold (born 1973), American writer
- Eliza Frančiška Grizold (1847–1913), Slovenian teacher, poet, and composer
- Eliza Gutch (1840–1931), English author
- Eliza Hall (1847–1916), Australian philanthropist
- Eliza Calvert Hall (1856–1935), American author and suffragist
- Elizabeth "Eliza" Schuyler Hamilton (1757–1854), American philanthropist and wife of United States Founding Father Alexander Hamilton
- Eliza Hamrick, American politician
- Eliza Maria Harvey (1838–1903), Canadian dairy farmer
- Eliza Marsden Hassall (1834–1917), lay leader of the Anglican Church
- Eliza Haycraft (1820–1871), American brothel owner and philanthropist
- Eliza Hayley, English translator and essayist
- Eliza Haywood (c. 1693–1756), English novelist and painter
- Eliza Putnam Heaton (1860–1919), American journalist, editor
- Eliza Parks Hegan (1861–1917), Canadian nurse
- Eliza Hendricks (1823–1903), Second Lady of the United States
- Eliza Edmunds Hewitt (1851–1920), American hymn writer and teacher
- Eliza Trask Hill (1840–1908), American activist, journalist, philanthropist
- Eliza Hittman (born 1979), American film director
- Eliza Hamilton Holly (1799–1859), daughter of Alexander Hamilton and Elizabeth Schuyler Hamilton
- Eliza Howland (1835–1917), American author
- Eliza Humphreys (1850–1938), Scottish novelist
- Eliza Hynes (born 1992), Australian rules footballer and volleyball player
- Eliza Illiard (1905–1969), German actress
- Eliza Buckley Ingalls (1848–1918), American temperance activist
- Eliza James (1855–1927), English watercress grower and entrepreneur
- Eliza James (footballer) (1855–1927), Australian rules footballer
- Eliza Catherine Jelly, English bryozoologist
- Eliza Ann Jewett, American real-estate investor
- Eliza Joenck (born 1982), Brazilian model and actress
- Eliza McCardle Johnson (1810–1876), First Lady of the United States 1865–1869
- Eliza Sophia Robertson Johnson (1868–1926), American political activist and clubwoman
- Eliza Griffin Johnston, American wildflower painter and diarist
- Eliza Grew Jones (1803–1838), American Baptist missionary and lexicographer
- Eliza Jumel (1775–1865), American socialite
- Eliza Junor (1804–1861), Scotswoman of mixed race who was the daughter of a former enslaver
- Eliza Keil, New Zealand musical artist
- Eliza D. Keith (1854–1939), American educator, suffragist, journalist
- Eliza Kellas (1864–1943), American educator
- Eliza Hall Kendrick, American professor
- Eliza Kent (1760–1810), British traveler and writer
- Eliza Kirk (1812–1856), Irish sculptor
- Eliza Lawrence (1935–2016), Canadian politician
- Eliza Lee (1792–1864), American author
- Eliza Seaman Leggett (1815–1900), American suffragist and abolitionist
- Eliza Ellen Leonard, American medical missionary
- Eliza Leslie (1787–1858), American author of popular cookbooks
- Eliza Anne Leslie-Melville (1829–1919), English painter
- Eliza Lewis, Indian voice actress
- Eliza Lynn Linton (1822–1898), English novelist and journalist
- Eliza Lo Chin (born 1967), American internist
- Eliza Logan (1827–1872), American actress
- Eliza Lucas (1722–1799), American planter and agriculturalist
- Eliza Lynch (1833–1886), Irish woman; First Lady of Paraguay
- Eliza Macauley (1785–1837), British actress and campaigner
- Eliza Mackenzie (1816–1892), Scottish nurse superintendent
- Eliza Manningham-Buller (born 1948), British intelligence officer, director general of MI5 2002–07
- Eliza Kirkham Mathews (1772–1802), British novelist and poet
- Eliza McCartney (born 1996), New Zealand pole vaulter
- Eliza Ann McIntosh Reid (1841–1926), Canadian churchworker and clubwoman
- Eliza Jane McKissack (1828–1900), American music educator
- Eliza McLamb, American indie rock musician
- Eliza McNamara (born 2002), Australian rules footballer
- Eliza McNitt, American writer art director
- Eliza Meek (1832–1888), royal mistress of King Lunalilo
- Eliza Meteyard (1816–1879), English writer
- Eliza Gratia Campbell Miner, American artist
- Eliza Monroe Hay (1786–1840), American socialite and acting First Lady
- Eliza F. Morris (1821–1874), English hymnwriter
- Eliza Happy Morton (1852–1916), American author and educator
- Eliza Maria Mosher (1846–1928), American physician, educator, medical writer, inventor
- Eliza Muradyan (born 1993), Armenian-Russian model
- Eliza Myrie, American visual artist
- Eliza Nathanael (born 1973), Indonesian badminton player
- Eliza Neals, American musical artist
- Eliza Nelson (born 1956), Indian field hockey player
- Eliza Newton (1827–1882), Scottish stage actress
- Eliza Nicholson (runner) (born 2007), British athlete
- Eliza Bland Smith Erskine Norton, British poet, playwright and author
- Eliza Roszkowska Öberg (born 1978), Polish-Swedish political figure
- Eliza O'Flaherty (1818–1882), Australian writer and stage actress
- Eliza Orlins (born 1982), American lawyer from New York City
- Eliza Orme (1848–1937), English lawyer and editor
- Eliza Orzeszkowa (1841–1910), Polish writer nominated for the Nobel prize
- Eliza Wright Osborne (1829–1911), American suffragist and feminist
- Eliza Ann Otis, American poet, journalist, and philanthropist
- Eliza Henderson Boardman Otis, American philanthropist and novelist
- Eliza Outtrim (born 1985), American freestyle skier
- Eliza Pande, American tennis player
- Eliza Hall Nutt Parsley (1842–1920), American philanthropist and school founder
- Eliza Parsons (1739–1811), English novelist
- Eliza Phillips (1823–1916), English animal welfare activist
- Eliza Pineda (born 1995), Filipino actress
- Eliza A. Pittsinger (1837–1908), American poet
- Eliza Poe (1787–1811), English-American actress, mother of Edgar Allan Poe
- Eliza Pollock (1840–1919), American archer
- Eliza Potter (1820–1893), African-American hairdresser
- Eliza Pottie (1837–1907), Australian evangelist, pacifist and reformer
- Eliza Jane Pratt (1902–1981), American politician
- Eliza Urbanus Pupella (died 1996), Indonesian journalist and nationalist leader
- Eliza Taylor Ransom (1863–1955), Canadian-born American physician
- Eliza Reid (born 1976), First Lady of Iceland
- Eliza Rennie (1813–1869), Scottish-born romantic and gothic short story author
- Eliza Rickman (born 1983), American musical artist
- Eliza Ridgely (1803–1867), American heiress and socialite
- Eliza McHatton Ripley, American civil war era author
- Eliza Roberts (nurse), English nurse among the first to accompany Florence Nightingale
- Eliza Roberts (poet), British Romantic-era poet and translator of Rousseau
- Eliza Robertson, Canadian writer
- Eliza Rose (born 1991), English DJ, music producer and singer
- Eliza Pickrell Routt (1839–1907), American activist and First Lady of Colorado
- Eliza Rycembel (born 1992), Polish actress
- Eliza Salmon (1787–1849), English vocalist
- Eliza Sam (born 1984), Canadian actress based in Hong Kong
- Eliza Scanlen (born 1999), Australian actress
- Eliza Schneider (born 1978), American actress
- Eliza Ruhamah Scidmore (1856–1928), American writer and photographer
- Eliza Scudder (1821–1896), American hymnwriter
- Eliza Seymour Lee (1800–1874), American pastry chef and restaurateur
- Eliza Sharpe (1796–1874), English painter
- Eliza Sheffield (1856–1942), British entrepreneur and socialite
- Eliza Pearl Shippen, American educator
- Eliza Brown Newton Smart (1844–1930), Portugal-born British missionary and temperance worker
- Eliza Doyle Smith, American songwriter
- Eliza Kennedy Smith (1889–1964), American suffragist, civic activist and government reformer
- Eliza R. Snow (1804–1887), American religious leader and poet
- Eliza Southgate Bowne (1783–1809), American letter writer
- Eliza Soutsou (1837–1887), Greek writer and translator
- Eliza Hart Spalding (1807–1851), American missionary
- Eliza Fanny Staveley (1831–1903), British entomologist and author
- Eliza Stephens (1757–1815), English governess
- Eliza Daniel Stewart (1816–1908), early temperance movement leader in the United States
- Eliza Stewart Boyd (1833–1912), née Eliza Stewart, first woman to serve on a jury in America
- Eliza Stewart Udall (1855–1937), née Eliza Stewart, first telegraph operator in Arizona
- Eliza Sturge (1842–1905), British women's rights activist
- Eliza Suggs (1876–1908), American author
- Eliza Read Sunderland (1839–1910), American writer, educator, lecturer, women's rights advocate
- Eliza Surdyka (born 1977), Polish cross-country skier
- Eliza Swenson (born 1982), American actress
- Eliza Szonert (born 1974), Australian actress
- Eliza Talcott (1836–1911), American missionary
- Eliza Taylor-Cotter (born 1989), Australian actress
- Eliza Thompson (1816–1905), American temperance activist
- Eliza Tibbets (1823–1898), California founder of the citrus industry
- Eliza Tinsley (1813–1882), English businessperson
- Elīza Tīruma (born 1990), Latvian luger
- Eliza Townsend (1788–1854), American poet
- Eliza Townsend (politician), American politician
- Eliza H. Trotter, Irish artist
- Eliza Turck (1832–1891), English painter
- Eliza Sproat Turner (1826–1903), American poet
- Eliza Osgood Vanderbilt Webb (1860–1936), American heiress
- Eliza Vozemberg (born 1956), Greek lawyer and politician
- Eliza Walker, multiple people
- Eliza Warren (1810–1900), English writer
- Eliza Wheeler (born 1982), American author and illustrator
- Eliza Jane White, who published as Ida L. White, Irish poet, republican, feminist, atheist, and anarchist
- Eliza White (missionary), English Wesleyan Methodist missionary to New Zealand
- Eliza Wigham (1820–1899), Scottish activist
- Eliza Wilbur (1851–1930), American astronomer
- Eliza Tupper Wilkes (1844–1917), American suffragist and Unitarian Universalist minister
- Eliza Yonge Wilkinson (1757–?), American letter-writer
- Eliza Maria Willoughby, Lady Middleton, British poet
- Eliza Winston (1830–?), American slave
- Eliza Withington (1825–1877), American photographer
- Eliza Woods, American classical composer
- Eliza Wyatt, American playwright
- Eliza Ann Youmans (1826–1914), American botanist
- Eliza Mazzucato Young (1846–1937), American composer and musician

== Fictional characters ==
Characters in literary and screen works known solely as Eliza include:

- Eliza (Uncle Tom's Cabin), a slave from Uncle Tom's Cabin
- Eliza (Stephenson character), a socialite from Neal Stephenson's Baroque Cycle of novels
- Eliza, the wife in the Eliza series of novels by Barry Pain
- Eliza, a ghost child in short film Tormented
- Eliza, love interest of Faust VIII in the manga Shaman King
- Eliza, a female narcoleptic vampire from the Tekken series
- Eliza (real name Neferu), a singer, model, and diva from Skullgirls

Characters that have the first name Eliza and a known last name include:

- Elizabeth "Eliza" Bennet in the novel Pride and Prejudice
- Elizabeth "Eliza" Doolittle in the play Pygmalion (played by Mrs. Patrick Campbell) and the musical inspired by it, My Fair Lady (played on stage by Julie Andrews and in the film by Audrey Hepburn)
- Eliza and Neil, second boss in Fantastic Parodius and Otomedius
- Eliza Aitan, police department lead detective in Workaholic
- Eliza Cassan, one of the news reporters seen in the Deus Ex videogame saga
- Eliza Cohen, a female FBI SWAT operator from Tom Clancy's Rainbow Six Siege
- Eliza Danvers, Kara Danvers/Supergirl's foster mother in Supergirl, played by Helen Slater
- Eliza Dooley, a main character of the TV series Selfie
- Eliza the Easter Egg Fairy, a character in the British book series Rainbow Magic
- Eliza Fisher, a main character debuting in the second and final season of Siren in which she is a blonde mermaid
- Eliza Fletcher, a character in the Phineas and Ferb episode My Fair Goalie who was inspired by Eliza Doolittle
- Eliza Makepeace, one of the main characters in The Forgotten Garden, from Australian author Kate Morton
- Eliza Thornberry, voiced by Lacey Chabert in The Wild Thornberrys
- Eliza Zambi from the Zombies (franchise)

== See also ==
- Elisa (given name)
- Eliza (disambiguation)
