= Eliza White =

Eliza White may refer to:

- Eliza Jane White, who published as Ida L. White, Irish poet, republican, feminist, atheist, and anarchist
- Eliza White (missionary), Wesleyan Methodist missionary
