= Élise =

- Gender: Female
- Language: French

Other names
- Variant forms: Elise, Ellise, Elize, Elyse, Elyce
- Related names: Eliza, Elsa

Élise, Ellise, Elise, Elyse, Elyce or Elize is the shortened feminine French form of Elizabeth, coming originally from the Hebrew name אלישבע (אלי = My God שבע = oath; "Elisheva") and meaning "My God is an oath" or "My God is abundance".

== People ==
=== Élise ===
- Élise Bruyère (1776–1847), a French painter who specialized in portraits and floral still lives
- Élise Bussaglia (born 1985), French football player
- Élise Crombez (born 1982), Belgian fashion model
- Élise Fajgeles (born 1970), French politician
- Élise Guilbault (born 1961), Canadian film and television actress
- Élise Leboucher (born 1982), French politician
- Élise Lucet (born 1963), French investigative journalist and television host
- Élise Marc (born 1987), French Paralympic cyclist and paratriathlete
- Élise Paré-Tousignant (1937–2018), Canadian music educator and administrator
- Élise Rivet (1890–1945), French World War II heroine
- Élise Turcotte (born 1957), Canadian writer

=== Elise ===
- Elise Allen, American author, TV producer and screenwriter
- Elise Averdieck (1808–1907), German social activist
- Elise Bauman (born 1990), Canadian actress, director, filmmaker, and singer
- Elise Burgin (born 1962), American tennis player
- Elise Christie (born 1990), British short-track speed-skater
- Elise Cranny (born 1996), American middle and long-distance runner
- Elise Doganieri (born 1967), American TV producer
- Elise Froese (born 2006), Canadian wheelchair basketball player
- Elise Frösslind (1793–1862), Swedish opera singer
- Elise Hall (born 1989), American politician
- Princess Elise of Hohenlohe-Langenburg (1864–1929), last Princess Reuss Younger Line
- Elise Holst (1811–1891), Danish stage actress
- Elise Hwasser (1831–1894), Swedish actress
- Elise Kellond-Knight (born 1990), Australian footballer
- Elise Thérèse Koekkoek-Daiwaille (1814–1891), Dutch painter and lithographer
- Elise List (1822–1893), German singer
- Elise Mertens (born 1995), Belgian tennis player
- Elise Mourant (1921–1990), New Zealand artist
- Elise Neal (born 1970), American actress
- Elise Norwood (born 1981), Australian water polo player
- Elise Minette Levy (1919–2023), American ballerina
- Elise Ramette (born 1998), Belgian basketball player
- Elise Richter (1865–1943), Austrian professor of philology
- Elisabeth Röckel (1793–1883), German soprano, possible dedicatee of Für Elise
- Elise Ryder Wikén (born 1968), Swedish politician
- Elise Stefanik (born 1984), American politician
- Elise Stenevik (born 1999), Norwegian footballer
- Elise Sydendal (born 1999), Danish politician
- Elise Testone (born 1983), American singer and songwriter
- Elise Thorner (born 2001), British track and field athlete
- Elise Varner Winter (1926-2021), American political hostess and activist
- Elise Wortley (born 1990), British explorer
- Elise de Vère (1879-1966), British stage actress, singer and dancer

=== Elyse ===
- Elyse Aehle (1894–1981), American violinist and conductor
- Elyse Graham, American writer and historian
- Elyse Knox (1917–2012), American actress, model, and fashion designer
- Elyse Myers (born 1993), American social media influencer, comedian, and musician
- Elyse Levesque (born 1985), Canadian actress
- Elyce Lin-Gracey (born 2007), American figure skater
- Elyse Willems (born 1986), Canadian internet personality

=== Elize ===
- EliZe (born 1982), born Elise van der Horst, Dutch singer-songwriter
- Elize Cawood (1952–2020), South African actress
- Elize Hele (1560–1635), English lawyer and philanthropist
- Elize Kotze, former head coach of the South Africa national netball team
- Elize Ryd (born 1984), Swedish musician
- Elize du Toit (born 1981), British actress

== Fictional characters ==
- Elise the Dancing Girl, a title character in the Japanese short story "The Dancing Girl"
- Elise the Spider Queen, a playable champion character in the video game League of Legends
- Princess Elise the Third, a major character and love interest of Sonic in the 2006 Sonic the Hedgehog video game
- Elise, the youngest princess of Nohr in the 2015 video game Fire Emblem Fates
- Elise Schwarzer, in the Trails of Cold Steel video game series
- Élise de la Serre, a supporting character in the video game Assassin's Creed Unity
- Elyse Keaton, a main character on the American sitcom Family Ties, played by Meredith Baxter
- Elise, in The Astounding Wolf-Man comic book series
- Elise, in the video game Dead or Alive Xtreme Venus Vacation
- Princess Elise, a playable protagonist in the 2008 video game My World, My Way
- Elise, a supporting antagonist in the 2012 manga and 2016 anime series Bungo Stray Dogs
- Elise, the mother of Marceline the Vampire Queen in the animated series Adventure Time
- Elise de Clorance, a titular character in the South Korean web novel Doctor Elise: The Royal Lady with the Lamp
- Elise Murphy, a minor character in 2024 film Tarot, played by Larsen Thompson
- Elise Elliot, a character in 1996 film The First Wives Club, played by Goldie Hawn
- Elise, a non-binary antagonist in the indie video game Jackpot Crash Course
- Elise Zakaria, a main character in the 2026 TV show The Body, played by Sara Boustany

== See also ==
- Elise (disambiguation)
- Elisa (given name)
- Eliza (given name)
