= Liza (name) =

Liza is primarily a feminine given name. It is sometimes used as a nickname for Elizabeth, Eliza and Luiza.

== Given name ==
- Liza Andriyani (born 1979), Indonesian tennis player
- Liza Anne, American folk musician
- Liza Anokhina (born 2007), Russian blogger and TikToker
- Liza Arzamasova (born 1995), Russian actress
- Liza Bagrationi (born 1974), Georgian singer
- Liza Balkan, Canadian actress
- Liza Béar, American filmmaker
- Liza Berggren (born 1986), Swedish model
- Liza Brönner (born 1989), Afrikaans singer and songwriter
- Liza Burgess (born 1964), Welsh rugby union player
- Liza Butler, Australian politician
- Liza Campbell (born 1959), Scottish artist, calligrapher, columnist and writer
- Liza Chasin, American film producer
- Liza Cody (born 1944), English novelist
- Liza Colón-Zayas (born c. 1972), American actress and playwright
- Liza Comita, American ecologist
- Liza Corso, American Paralympic athlete
- Liza Dalby (born 1950), American anthropologist
- Liza Diño (born 1983), Filipino government official, former beauty pageant winner and actress
- Liza Donnelly, American cartoonist and writer
- Liza Echeverría (born 1972), Mexican actress, model and television presenter
- Liza Essers, art gallery owner
- Liza Featherstone (born 1969), American journalist
- Liza Ferschtman (born 1979), Dutch violinist
- Liza Fior (born 1962), British architect
- Liza Fromer (born 1970), Canadian television host
- Liza Frulla (born 1949), Canadian politician
- Liza Goddard (born 1950), British actress
- Liza Grobler (born 1974), South African Mixed Media artist
- Liza Hanim (born 1979), Malaysian singer and actress
- Liza Harvey (born 1966), Australian politician
- Liza Makowski Hayes, American nutritional biochemist
- Liza Helder (born 1989), Aruban model and beauty pageant titleholder
- Liza Huber (born 1975), American television actress
- Liza Hunter-Galvan (born 1969), New Zealand runner
- Liza Jacqueline a voice actress has work for 4Kids Entertainment
- Liza Johnson (born 1970), American film director, producer, and writer
- Liza Kennedy (born 1989), Japanese model
- Liza Kisteneva (born 1998), Russian chess player
- Liza Koshy (born 1996), American YouTuber and actress
- Liza Figueroa Kravinsky (born 1962), American composer, filmmaker, and actress
- Liza Lapira (born 1981), American actress
- Liza Lehmann (1862–1918), English operatic soprano and composer
- Liza Levy, American activist
- Liza Li (born 1988), German singer
- Liza Lim (born 1966), Australian composer
- Liza Loop, technology pioneer
- Liza Lopez-Rosario (born 1963), Filipino lawyer
- Liza Lorena (born 1949), Filipino actress
- Liza Lou (born 1969), American visual artist
- Liza Manili (born 1986), French actress and singer
- Liza Araneta Marcos (born 1959), Filipina lawyer, First Lady of the Philippines and academic
- Liza Marklund (born 1962), Swedish journalist and crime writer
- Liza Maza (born 1957), Filipino activist
- Liza Minnelli (born 1946), American actress and singer
- Liza Monroy (born 1979), American novelist
- Liza Morozova (Born 1973), Russian artist
- Liza Morrow, American actress
- Liza van der Most (born 1993), Dutch footballer
- Liza del Mundo (born 1975), Filipino-American voice actress
- Liza Mundy (born 1960), American journalist and non-fiction writer
- Liza Nakashidze-Bolkvadze (1885–1938), Georgian politician
- Liza Jessie Peterson, American playwright, actor, activist, and educator
- Liza Parker (born 1980), English badminton player
- Liza Jessie Peterson, American dramatist
- Liza Picard (1927–2022), English historian
- Liza May Post, Dutch artist
- Liza Potvin, Canadian novelist
- Liza Pulman (born 1969), British singer and actress
- Liza Elly Purnamasari (born 1991), Indonesian presenter, model and beauty pageant titleholder
- Liza Pusztai (born 2001), Hungarian fencer
- Liza Quin (born 1982), Cuban-American artist
- Liza Rachetto (born 1974), American racing cyclist
- Liza Redfield (1924–2018), American conductor, pianist, and composer
- Liza Renlund (born 1997), Swedish footballer
- Liza Richardson, American music supervisor and DJ
- Liza Fernández Rodríguez (born 1973), Puerto Rican attorney and politician
- Liza del Rosario, Filipino bowler
- Liza Ryan (born 1965), American visual artist
- Liza Sadovy, British actress
- Liza del Sierra (born 1985), French pornographic actress, film director and producer
- Liza Snyder (born 1968), American actress
- Liza Soberano (born 1998), Filipino-American actress and model
- Liza Sylvestre (born 1983), American visual artist
- Liza Tarbuck (born 1964), British actress and television presenter
- Liza Umarova (born 1965), Chechen singer and actress
- Liza Vorfi (1924–2011), Albanian stage actress and singer
- Liza Walker (born 1972), English actress
- Liza Wang (born 1947), Hong Kong opera singer
- Liza Weil (born 1977), American actress
- Liza Wieland (born 1960), American novelist
- Liza Witt, member of Australian pop group Teen Queens
- Liza Wright, American politician

== Surname ==
- Sania Sultana Liza, Bangladeshi singer

== Fictional people ==
- Liza Colby, character in the American soap opera, All My Children
- Liza Miller, character in the American television series, Younger
- Liza Moon, character in the English soap opera, Eastenders
- Liza Ortiz, character in the American television series, Fear the Walking Dead
- Liza Walton Sentell, character on American soap opera, Search for Tomorrow
- Liza Snow, a character in the video game, Far Cry 3
- Liza Giangrande, a Season 4 contestant in Fetch! with Ruff Ruffman
- Liza, one of the two Gym Leaders in Pokémon Ruby & Sapphire's Mossdeep City Gym, along with Tate
