= Hegan =

Hegan is a surname. Notable people with the surname include:

- Danny Hegan (1943–2015), Scottish-born Northern Ireland footballer
- Eliza Parks Hegan (1861–1917), Canadian nurse
- Jim Hegan (1920–1984), American baseball player and coach
- Kenneth Hegan (1901–1989), English footballer
- Mike Hegan (1942–2013), American baseball player
