= Aliza =

- Gender: Female
- Language: Hebrew

Origin
- Meaning: Joy

Other names
- Related names: Freyde, Eliza

Aliza (Hebrew: עֲלִיזָה) is a feminine given name, meaning "joyful" in Hebrew. It has been used as a translation of the Yiddish name Freyde. Notable people with the name include:

- Aliza Begin (1920–1982), wife of Prime Minister Menachem Begin
- Aliza Bin-Noun, Israeli diplomat
- Aliza Green, American chef and writer
- Aliza Greenblatt (1888–1975), American poet
- Aliza Gur, American actress
- Aliza Kashi, Israeli singer
- Aliza Lavie (born 1964), Israeli academic and politician
- Aliza Licht, American marketing expert and author
- Aliza Magen-Halevi (1937–2025), Israeli intelligence officer
- Aliza Napartivaumnuay (born c. 1983), Thai businesswoman
- Aliza Nisenbaum (born 1977), Mexican painter
- Aliza Olmert (born 1946), Israeli artist, photographer, writer and social worker
- Aliza Sherman, American writer
- Aliza Vellani (born 1991), Canadian actress
