= Tormented =

Tormented refers to someone that has been subjected to a torment, such as the tormento della corda.

It may also refer to:

== Films ==
- Tormented (1960 film), a thriller film directed by Bert I. Gordon
- Tormented (2009 British film), a British horror comedy film
- Tormented (2009 Salvadorean film), a Salvadorean animated short film
- Tormented (2011 film), a Japanese horror film

== Albums ==
- Tormented (Abscess album)
- Tormented (Staind album)
