= A Hairdresser's Experience in High Life =

Book by Eliza Potter

Eliza Potter, a freeborn woman of mixed race during the antebellum period, chronicles her experience as a hairdresser, the gossip she encounters, and her life experiences both in the United States and Europe in her book, A Hairdresser's Experience in High Life.

== Historical context ==
Eliza Potter’s narrative was published in 1859 prior to the Civil War. She writes her narrative as a free black woman of mixed race during the antebellum era who travels throughout the United States and Europe.

== Summary ==
=== The Preface: "The Author's Appeal" ===
In Eliza Potter’s preface to her narrative, Potter states the reason for writing her book: "[I]nfluenced by the earnest persuasions of may ladies and gentlemen, I have at last concluded that I might just as well note down a few of my experiences for their amusement as not." Potter tells her audience that the purpose of her writing is to give her audience the gossip that they had requested from her. Also in her preface, Potter compares the importance of her profession as a hairdresser to that of a physician or clergyman: "But no where do hearts betray themselves more unguardedly than in the private boudoir ... Why, then, should not the hair-dresser write, as well as the physician and clergyman." Potter explains that her work as a hairdresser is equally as valuable to other vocations.

=== Chapter One: "My Debut" ===
Potter begins her chapter by explaining the nature of her writing style. She calls this disorganized way of writing "a little harum scarum." She then begins her story by saying that she grew up in New York and worked in service of people, but always desired to travel. In the chapter, she details her travels to various cities in Canada, Pittsburgh, Cincinnati, Louisville, Washington City, and Paris. During this time, Potter states that she worked as a hairdresser to several different ladies. Also within the chapter, Potter comments on her ideas of lady hood and the slave trade.

=== Chapter Two: "England" ===
In "England," Potter reveals the way she is treated as a free black woman during the antebellum era in various parts of the world. She travels with the S. family in this chapter and records her experiences. Potter also notes the differences between how servants are treated in Europe versus America.

=== Chapter Three: "America" ===
At the beginning of the chapter, Potter tells how she lived with a family in Cincinnati. Desiring to travel again, Potter leaves for Memphis and accounts how slaves are treated there. She then goes to New Orleans but does not leave the ship. Later in the chapter, Potter tells about some of the women whose hair she dresses and gossips about a woman whose husband left her.

=== Chapter Four: "Saratoga" ===
Eliza Potter details her experiences at the United States Hotel. She tells about the ballroom, describes ladylike attire, and depicts fashion in the U.S. In this chapter, Potter discloses several stories of gossip but explains that she "merely write[s] them out for the amusement of those who may wish to indulge themselves in a little gossip." She also mentions how chambermaids are treated. Later, she gives accounts of marriages and deaths in high life.

=== Chapter Five: "Leaving Saratoga – Burning of the Baggage Car – Visit to New York" ===
Potter starts her chapter by saying that she has returned to Albany, but she first wants to tell a story of when she left and the baggage cart caught flame. She attempts to retrieve her clothing and describes her amusement when gentlemen question her ability to have an expensive wardrobe. After this event, Potter depicts various mansions in New York.

=== Chapter Six: "New Port – The Maid's Story" ===
Potter states that she is now going to go back in time to when she worked at Saratoga to tell a story. In the chapter, Potter describes her own dress at a ball in comparison to other white ladies in high life. She states that her "own dress was the brightest crimson that could be found." Afterwards, she retells a story that a maid told her about how a woman in high life cheated on her husband.

=== Chapter Seven: "Minnie" ===
Potter reminisces on her experience working for a family in Kentucky and the story of one of their daughters Minnie. A gentlemen by the name of Noble fall in love with Minnie, but Potter says, "Minnie, young as she was, already loved another." Minnie marries Noble to the delight of her mother. However, Minnie proves to be unhappy since Noble attempts to control her. Potter then explains how Minnie leaves Noble.

=== Chapter Eight: "Natchez – New Orleans" ===
In "Natchez – New Orleans", Potter explains how women use her work as a hairdresser to make themselves beautiful despite in reality being ugly. She also provides an account of race relations and how a woman of color proved to be the "most tyrannical, overbearing, cruel task-mistress that ever existed." Additionally, Potter discloses the story of when she critiques a woman in high life. When a lady and man conversed in front of her in French to conceal their conversation, Potter chastises the woman. She closes her chapter by describing the unjust treatment of slaves.

=== Chapter Nine: "Cincinnati" ===
Potter begins her chapter by giving a description of her profession. She then shifts her focus to explain how parties are conducted in France and England (121). Potter then explains her time in servitude to Mr. L. Potter believes Mr. L is a true gentleman who has done numerous good deeds under her observation. Potter also expounds upon her views of slavery and abolitionists. Later in the chapter, Potter gives her explanation of what constitutes a lady. She closes her narrative by giving her opinion to a lady at the opera.

== Critical analysis ==
- In Francis Smith Foster's book, Written by Herself: Literary Production by African American Women 1746–1892, she discusses how African American women "consciously revised [literary] tradition to more accurately conform to their truths and their visions. ... And they were testing ways in which the English language and its literature might better serve them as African American women writers."
- Rnyetta Davis argues that Potter's "adeptness at pointing out white women’s performances shows not only her ability to spot frauds, but also illustrates her refusal to pass for something she is not. Unlike the fraudulent women she encounters, Potter does not wear false, fake or borrowed jewelry, or shoes and clothing that are too small."
- Xiomara Santamarina in her book Belabored Professions states that by maintaining distance, Potter receives her white audience's trust and seemingly remains in her societal designated sphere: "Having established her independence from her clients as wage laborer appears to have worked to Potter’s advantage, since it could be viewed as adhering to racial and class hierarchies."
- Lisa Ze Winters argues that New Orleans, a state where slavery was legal, would cause Potter to share her beliefs: "A city as infamous for the size of its slave market ... could not function merely as a discursive site for Potter. ... Indeed, Potter consistently reminds her readers of the terror faced by any black woman, slave or free, moving across a U.S. landscape."
