= Eliza Agnew =

American Christian missionary

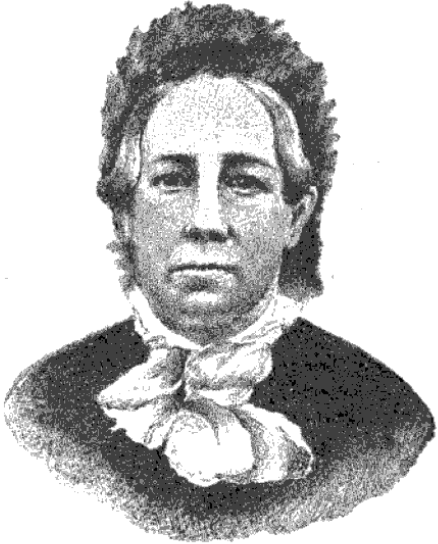
- Eliza Agnew, from a 1894 publication.
- Born: February 2, 1807; New York City, New York, U.S.
- Died: June 14, 1883 (aged 76); British Ceylon
- Occupation: Missionary

Eliza Agnew (February 2, 1807 – June 14, 1883) was an American Presbyterian missionary who taught for over forty years in Uduvil, Ceylon (now Sri Lanka). She was known as the "Mother of a Thousand Daughters" for her many alumnae, and was the first unmarried American woman missionary in Ceylon.

== Early life ==
Eliza Agnew was born in New York City in 1807, the daughter of James and Jane Agnew. As a girl, she was inspired by an 1823 revival meeting at the Orange Street Presbyterian Church to dedicate her life to church work. She began her service in the home, to the "Sabbath-school", and in the distribution of Scripture and tracts.

== Missionary work ==
After her parents died, Agnew secured appointment to the Ceylon Mission of the American Board of Boston in 1839. She sailed from Boston, Massachusetts to Jaffna, Ceylon, aboard the Black Warrior. She served as teacher for 42 years without furlough in the Female Boarding School in Uduvil, just north of Jaffna, Ceylon. "I gave it all up when I left America," she said of her unbroken tenure at Uduvil. She was known as "Mother of a thousand daughters," and was the first unmarried American woman missionary in Ceylon.

Agnew oversaw the building of new dormitories at Uduvil as the school grew in size and prestige. She visited and assisted graduates and ex-pupils with home economics and spiritual affairs. She resigned as principal of the school in 1879 and moved to Manipay, just west of the school. She resided in the home of Misses Mary and Margaret W. Leitch, American Board missionaries in Manipay. She died from a paralytic stroke in June 1883 and was buried in Uduvil near the school over which she presided.
