= My World, My Way (video game) =

2008 video game

- North American cover art
- Developer: Global A Entertainment
- Publishers: JP: Global A Entertainment; NA: Atlus USA
- Platforms: Nintendo DS; PlayStation Portable
- Release: DS: JP: June 12, 2008; NA: February 3, 2009; PSP: JP: July 9, 2009
- Genre: RPG
- Mode: Single-player

My World, My Way, released in Japan as Sekai wa Atashi de Mawatteru, (Note: Sekai wa Atashi de Mawatteru (世界はあたしでまわってる; lit.The World Revolves Around Me)) is a 2008 role-playing video game developed by Global A Entertainment on Nintendo DS and PlayStation Portable, published in North America by Atlus. It features two key gameplay elements which puts the player into the role of Princess Elise, a young, spoiled princess on a quest to impress a handsome adventurer into being her boyfriend.

== Gameplay ==
My World, My Way features two key game-play elements. One of which is Princess Elise's ability to pout, which prompts enemies and the game's landscape alike to change to her will through the usage of "pout points". By expending Pout Points the player can do a number of things to make tasks in the game easier, including forcing enemies to drop more money or experience points, completing quests automatically and altering the game's current environment to fulfill in-game requests due to certain items and enemies only being in certain areas. Princess Elise has the ability to make an environment area barren, a grassland, a forest, an island, a fire pit, a graveyard, a desert and more. As the player advances in the game, Elise's selfishness is refined and she gains a variety of different commands.

The second element is Elise's pet "Mimic Slime", which the player controls in battle along with Elise herself. Instead of leveling up via experience points, the Mimic Slime's abilities increase via mimicking the game's enemies. An example being that if it mimics an enemy with a high number of hit points, its own hit points will increase, and if that enemy has the ability to equip a certain piece of equipment the Mimic Slime will gain that trait too.

The player traverses the game's world via an unconventional world map. Players choose a town area for the princess to visit, and once she enters, there will be a grid representing the surrounding landscape. One square has a town, one will have a gate, and the rest will be environment squares she can change. In order to unlock the gate, the princess has to fulfill requests from the town's mayor. Once she is in an area, the player can press the 'A' button to search for items and monsters. After a period of time the area will run out of items or opponents; the player can then use the princess's Pout Points to refresh the area, drawing more enemies there.

== Plot ==
Elise is a beautiful princess who has been given everything she has ever wanted. Upon turning 15, she realizes there is only one thing in the world she lacks – a handsome boyfriend. Thus, Elise orders her father to hold a ball and to invite every prince in the land. Elise meets her dream boyfriend at the ball, but he turns out to be an adventurer rather than a prince. To Elise's dismay, the adventurer tells her that she must become an experienced adventurer herself if she ever hopes to be with him. To the kingdom's surprise, Elise sets out to do just that.

There are connections between this game and another Atlus title, Master of the Monster Lair, most noticeably the appearance of the game's two main characters, Owen and Kate, as Dungeon Makers.

== Release ==
The title was changed for the North American release to avoid confusion with The World Ends with You.

On March 23, 2009, Famitsu announced that Global A Entertainment would be making an enhanced remake for PlayStation Portable. The enhanced port features a new Mode called "Light & Dark", new character, and new voice-over.

== Reception ==
Reception

Aggregate score
Aggregator	Score
Metacritic	67/100

Review scores
Publication	Score
Famitsu	31/40
Game Informer	6/10
GameSpot	5/10
GamesRadar+	3.5/5
IGN	8/10
Nintendo Power	7/10
RPGamer	2.5/5
RPGFan	65%

The DS version received "average" reviews according to the review aggregation website Metacritic. Mark Bozon of IGN in a positive review called the game "fun", "imaginative" and "innovative". In a more critical review, GameSpot's Shiva Stella felt that the game was "cute" but that the battle system was lacking and called the characters "flat" and the story "boring".

In Japan, Famitsu gave it a score of 31 out of 40.
