= Eliza Gratia Campbell Miner =

American artist (1805–1891)

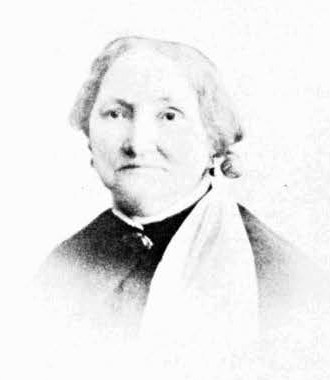
- Born: November 19, 1805; Middlebury
- Died: December 31, 1891

Elizabeth Gratia Campbell Miner (November 19, 1805 – December 31, 1891) was an American painter and embroiderer from Canton, New York.

== Early life and marriage ==
Eliza Gratia Campbell was born on November 19, 1805 in Middlebury, Vermont, the daughter of Dr. Daniel Campbell, a physician and businessman, and Elizabeth Sedgwick Campbell. On March 2, 1829, she married businessman and manufacturer Ebenezer Miner in Canton.

== Artistic work ==
Miner embroidered a sixteen foot square carpet over the course of eight years. The carpet had twenty four (or as many as 64) panels, many of them floral panels and panels depicting animals including golden retrievers, cattle, deer, and sheep. The carpet was exhibited at the 1844 New York State Fair. As early as the 1880s, the carpet was disassembled and the panels distributed amongst family members. One surviving panel is currently owned by the Shelburne Museum, and others by St. Lawrence University.

There is evidence that Miner exhibited her paintings in the 1860s and 1870s. Around 1871, Miner painted a large watercolor of the Canton Fair, now owned by St. Lawrence University. It hung in the parlor of Miner home in Canton, where it was probably seen by a young Frederick Remington. The painting has been repeatedly exhibited as a key example of regional folk art.

Miner also practiced china painting.

== Later life ==
In her elderly years, she used a wheelchair and spent winters in California.
