= Liza Jessie Peterson =

American dramatist

Liza Jessie Peterson is an American playwright, actress, activist, and educator. She is known for her one-woman show, The Peculiar Patriot and her appearances in Ava DuVernay's film 13th.

== Early life ==
Liza Jessie Peterson is originally from Philadelphia, Pennsylvania. She attended Georgetown University and majored in International Relations, hoping to become a diplomat or a lobbyist post-graduation. Throughout her college career, Peterson was active on campus, becoming head of Georgetown's Black Student Union her freshman year. However, Peterson moved to Paris in the early 1990s and became a fashion model. Her first show was for Jean Paul Gaultier. After modeling for three years, Peterson moved to New York and started to delve into the, at the time, underground slam poetry scene.

=== Teaching career ===
In 1998 Peterson began working at Riker's Island Academy on Riker's Island teaching poetry for students there. Originally supposed to be a three-week job, Peterson found herself staying there for three years due to the high demand for her classes from students and teachers. In 2008 Peterson accepted a full-time position at Riker's Academy. By 2018, Peterson will have taught at Riker's Island for 20 years. She created and developed The Urban Folktale Project, where her students created original plays based on their most pressing issues and performed it at several theaters around New York City. The project was so successful that it received a grant from Russell Simmons’ Rush Philanthropic Arts Foundation. The Urban Folktale Project has successfully produced three plays.

== Career as a Playwright ==
=== Peculiar Patriot ===
While Peterson has written several plays, her most recent and well known was her one-woman, solo performance, The Peculiar Patriot. Peterson has worked on this show since 2003 and was based on her own experiences teaching, newspaper articles, and prison reports. Peterson toured this production across the country in 35 jails and penitentiaries. In 2014 Peculiar Patriot was put on as the second show in the Penumbra's festival of experimental works. Peterson also opened for Angela Davis at the 2016 Columbia University Behind the Bars conference on Mass Incarceration. The play follows Betsy LaQuanda Ross who travels to prisons to visit her friends and family, offering them advice and updates on life outside of prison. The show was based on Peterson's work with New York City prisons. It first opened on September 17, 2017 in the National Black Theatre’s 49th season. It was directed by Talvin Wilks.

== Career in other fields ==
=== Poetry ===
Peterson began as a poet with the Nuyorican Poets Cafe in 1998. This later turned into Def Poetry. Two of her most well known spoken word poems are “Ice Cream Fiend” and “Waitress” which both were aired on the HBO show, Def Poetry Jam.

=== Books ===
Peterson's first book, All Day: A Year of Love and Survival Teaching Incarcerated Kids at Rikers Island, was published on April 18, 2017. This book covers a year in Peterson's classroom at Riker's Academy in which she taught a GED class. Peterson raised funds for the book through a Kickstarter campaign launched on July 21, 2013.

=== Film ===
Peterson has also acted in several films. She portrayed a slam poet in Marc Levin's 1998 movie Slam. She also portrayed the casting director in Spike Lee's Bamboozled. She is also known for her role of Pam in Love the Hard Way. In 2016, she was interviewed for the documentary 13.

== Critical reception ==
Peterson's one woman show The Peculiar Patriot has received praise from The New York Times and TheatreMania.

== Filmography ==
=== As an actress ===
Year	Title	Role	Notes
1998	Slam	Slam Poet "Ice Cream Fiend"	
1998	Peppermills	Martha	short film
2000	Bamboozled	Ruth (Casting Director)	
2001	Love the Hard Way	Pam	
2007	A Drop of Life	Nia	short film

=== As Herself ===
Year	Title	Role	Notes
2002-04	Def Poetry Jam	Herself	Episode 1.4 (2002) Episode 4.6 (2004)
2014	Hating Obama	Herself	Documentary
2016	13	Herself	Documentary
2021	Angola Do You Hear Us? Voices from a Plantation Prison	Herself	Short Documentary
