= Eliza Grant =

African American midwife

Eliza Grant (b. 1880-?) was an African American midwife from Raleigh, North Carolina. Her only records are a result of President Franklin D. Roosevelt’s Federal Writers’ Project, which she was interviewed for in 1938. The actual document with her interview in it can be found at UNC-Chapel Hill’s Wilson Library Archives.

== Biography ==
=== Family history ===
Born in 1880 in Raleigh, North Carolina to former slaves Mr. Curtis and Mrs. Tempie Curtis. Eliza Grant's mother, Tempie Curtis, was one of eleven children all born to slave Liza Cook and her Master Dr. Cook. After General Lee's surrender. Grant's mother became a midwife making thirty dollars a month plus board, while washing and cleaning for one dollar a week as a side job. Grants father drove a hack until they bought some land. After the purchase, most of the men in the family worked on the farm picking and growing cotton.

=== Family life ===
Eliza Grant was married to Andrew Grant and had three children named Thelma, Don and Curtis. Her husband was a porter for the school board, but died when the children were young. Thelma, Eliza’s oldest child was (like her mother) Baptist. She worshiped every day and was married to an alcoholic who thought she was having an affair with the minister. Don, Grant’s second child, died when he was thirty-two; leaving behind a ten-year-old son and his wife. Grant was hurt when her son died and even more mortified when her daughter in-law moved her grandson out of her house. Lastly, Grant’s youngest child, who was born due to Eliza’s failure at properly using birth control, still lived with her at the age of thirty and shined shoes at a college for a living. Grant gave birth to all of her children at home and without medication because, at that time, going to the hospital and receiving medication was expensive and frivolous unless a person was very ill.

=== Working life ===
When Grant's husband died, Eliza started to wash, cook, and occasionally midwife to make ends meet. Eventually Grant paid off her home, stopped working and started to live off of the profit of nine pigs she began to raise. The last job she had was taking care of Mrs. Dowdy and her three daughters. Eliza was disgusted by their laziness and claimed that when Mrs. Dowdy and her daughter’s time of the month would come they would remain in bed and miss school. Grant would then have to wait on them hand and foot. Grant believed that women should be diligent and hard working. Grant once stated that she disliked women that used being a woman as a crutch to avoid work.

== Social context ==
=== Racial tensions behind the debate between midwives and doctors ===
In the early 1900s physicians started to claim that midwifery was increasing the infant mortality rate. The physicians claimed that the midwives lacked the knowledge required to successfully birth a child. Furthermore, doctors feared that having women that were uneducated in the medical sciences supervising births would discredit the up-and-coming gynecology and obstetric fields. In addition physicians became increasingly disgruntled about the loss of revenue due to the midwife’s practice. Having a child via a midwife was much less expensive than having a child in a hospital so lower income families would use midwives instead of doctors. Therefore the majority of women giving birth with midwives lived in rural areas with low incomes and were mostly black. The state Board of Health survey discovered in 1931 that there were 4,266 midwives that delivered 23,234 or 31 percent off the 74,743 babies born in North Carolina in 1931. Physicians attended 88 percent of the white women delivering, in comparison to the 31 percent of black women delivering. African Americans according to Eliza grant found it frivolous to spend money for giving birth. The Grant family and the majority of the African American community only went to the doctor when they were extremely ill. By the 1920s the majority of midwives were African American women and immigrant women from the North. To solve what, at that time, was called the “midwife problem” physicians played up the fact that a lot of African American and immigrant women were midwives. They stressed stereotypes suggesting the midwives were unintelligent, backward, and superstitious and argued that they spread disease with their filthy customs and practices in attending birth and thus contributed to high levels of maternal and child mortality.

=== African Americans and birth control during 1930s ===
In the past birth control has been a major struggle present mainly in the lives of white middle class women. However, African American women played a key role in the advancement of birth control and its uses. Eliza Grant was aware of the new discovery of birth control, but not aware of how to properly use it or what the majority of white Americans goals were for the African American race in reference to the use of birth control. Margret Sanger the leading face of the birth control movement initially advocated the use of birth control for all women despite their race. She believed it provided women with increased social mobility.

However, after not developing a lot of support from simply advocating among women Sanger realized she needed to take a more scientific approach. Scientist advocated the use of birth control through eugenics or population control forces. “Eugenicists strongly espoused racial supremacy and "purity"," particularly of the "Aryan" race. Eugenicists hoped to purify the bloodlines and improve the race by encouraging the "fit" to reproduce and the "unfit" to restrict their reproduction”. As a result of Sanger backing the scientific approach to contraception racist depopulation policies increased. While it became an option for white women to use birth control it was viewed as a requirement for African American or immigrant women to use contraception (pg.166). Sanger later organized the Negro Project in 1939 whose main goal was to “exterminate” the black population. Sanger manipulated well-known African American leaders such as W.E.B. Du Bois into supporting this cause by making it appear that birth control would provide social mobility for African Americans, by decreasing number of children born into poverty the African American race will eventually move forward. In actuality Sanger's project was an addition to the mass eugenic movement across the south. Many African American women were uneducated about birth control, which is evident in Eliza Grants interview. Grant states that the reason she had her third son was because her birth control failed, she then goes on to state that African American’s have no business taking birth control anyway. In an attempt to educate these women Sanger convinced Africa American ministers to advocate the use of contraception to African American women throughout the south; “Sanger wrote, ‘We do not want word to go out that we want to exterminate the Negro population and the minister is the man who can straighten out that idea if it ever occurs to any of their more rebellious members’” pg.167)

According to Loretta J. Ross author of African-American Women and Abortion, African American women were not passive victims of eugenics and some truly believed birth control provided social mobility (pg.162). However, when birth rates among African American’s began to decrease in later years the decline was not attributed to the mass eugenics movement advocating forced sterilization and abortions in addition to increased contraception among the African American race. Nor was it attributed to the possibility African American women had become more informed and had a desire to choose whether or not they wanted children. Instead scientist attributed the decline in African American birth rates to poverty, disease, coercive family planning or other external factors (pg. 162).

== Issues of voice ==
=== Accuracy of events ===
The Federal Writers’ Project was a part of a larger project known as the Works Project Administration (WPA), which was a result of President Franklin D. Roosevelt’s New Deal Agency during The Great Depression. The FWP helped provide alternative job options for the unemployed white-collar workers who could not get jobs in construction or other labor fields that were being offered through the WPA. The main goal of the FWP was to record the unwritten oral history of American life, including slave and lower-income families. However the FWP’s recordings of historical events, specifically in reference to slaves, do not always provide an accurate discourse of what happened during and after slavery. The issues with the recordings of the FWP in reference to African Americans are described in the Oxford Journal's Oral History Review and appear within Eliza Grant's Midwife story as well. The writers of the Federal Writers’ Project were largely untrained. They already knew or had been acquainted with the interviewee, creating a conflict of interest. Though inexperienced, many of the interviewers were given general instructions on what to ask during the interviews (such as, when were you born, what line of work were you in, how were you treated during slavery, or how has life changed following the events of slavery). Grant's interviewer was untrained and lacked the ability to lead the interview; he asked a total of two questions throughout the entire dialogue, causing the interview to be controlled largely by Grant. In addition, the interviewer was Grant's nephew. Several instances he calls her Aunt Liza and speaks of her as if he already knows her and her stories. Additional information about her character and personality were added that would not have been recognized had he not previously been acquainted with Grant. The interviewers and interviewees were not the only issue that caused the Federal Writers’ Project to lack accuracy. The state officers directing the project edited most of the stories. “Editorial instructions from federal directors Henry G. Alsberg and John A. Lomax were to prepare a ‘faithful account of the ex-slaves' version of his experience’ in his own conversational style and dialect” (pg. 34). Meaning, if the person lacked an education and spoke with an increased amount of slang or poor grammar, the actual recordings of the interviewee’s speech should be written down. Alsberg specifically stated, “that truth to idiom be para-mount, and exact truth to pronunciation be secondary". Giving examples such as, “‘durin' of de war,’ ‘kinder chillish,’ and ‘piddled in de fields’” be used to add “flavor and vividness”(pg.34). However, many interviewers felt that discredited their writing ability, and added descriptions of the area and individuals to make the writings more stylish. Some altogether altered the interview and paraphrased or just referenced the interviewee’s actual descriptions. Eliza Grant’s interview was an example of an excessive use of African American vernacular. The writings cause Grant to sound uneducated, which takes credibility away from her writing. In addition, Harry Fain (Grant's interviewer) added extra detail on the home, her appearance and her character. He describes Grant as “heavy and of medium height. Her color was a kind of ruddy yellow…[and her] eyes had a certain flash that indicated vigor and action irrespective of her weight”. Addition of style and extra description are present in the opening of Grant's story as well. Fain describes the day as “a gusty November afternoon, but the sun was warm and the air sparkling”. The end of the introduction shows an extreme translation from stylistic writing to Eliza Grant's African American vernacular. This emphasizes Grant's incorrect grammar and loose speech. These are not necessary to the recording of what Grant was discussing and create perceptions of Grant and her home that may cause the reader to disbelieve her stories or disregard them as unintelligent or unladylike.
