= Eliza Newton =

Scottish stage actress (c. 1837 – 1882)

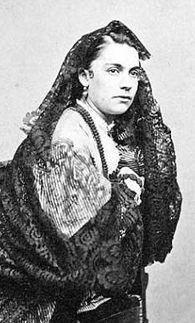
- Eliza Newton in costume, from a carte de visite published in the United States during her lifetime.
- Born: c. 1837; Dumfries
- Died: 7 February, 1882 (aged 44–45); New York City, U.S.
- Other name: Mrs. W. H. Blackmore
- Occupation: Actress

Eliza Newton (c. 1837 – 7 February 1882) was a Scottish stage actress.

== Early life ==
Newton was born in Dumfries, to a theatrical family. Her father John Newton was a comedian in a number of English theatres. Her grandfather was a theatre manager. She began to act as a child and played juvenile parts in prominent theatres in London, Manchester, Liverpool, and Edinburgh.

== Career ==
=== On the British stage ===
Newton traveled and performed popular musical and variety shows with her first husband, actor Frederick George Lloyd, brother of Scottish music hall entertainer Arthur Lloyd. A reviewer in 1863, when she was in a show at the New Royalty Theatre in London, commented that Eliza Newton was "not without a natural dash and force of manner, but needs to cultivate the art of self-control."

=== In the United States ===
Soon after her first husband's death, Newton moved to the United States under the management of J. H. Selwyn. She made her New York debut at the Olympic Theater on 31 October 1864, as Helen in Marguerite's Colors. Her other New York stage appearances included musical productions of Sleeping Beauty in the Wood (1865), Cinderella (1866–1867), Po-Ca-Hon-Tas (1869), Much Ado About a Merchant of Venice (1869), The Streets of New York (1869), and Poor Humanity (1869).

Newton worked with English theatrical producer Mrs. John Wood at the Olympic Theater, and was with the company of John Brougham when the Fifth Avenue Theatre opened in 1869. She left the Fifth Avenue Theatre and said goodbye to America at New York's French Theater, at a benefit in May 1869. However, decline in her health kept Newton from leaving America; instead, she toured in the United States, especially in the west. In 1873, for example, she performed in a burlesque titled Nymph of the Lurleyberg in Salt Lake City; and in winter 1879–1880, she appeared at the Sawtelle Theatre in Helena, Montana, in several shows, including The Hidden Hand (based on the Southworth novel), By Stealth, The Danicheffs, Kathleen Mavourneen, Leah, the Forsaken, The Swiss Cottage, The Returned Soldier, and Sketches in India. "It is only justice to say that the lady fully justified the greatest expectations," according to a Helena newspaper account.

== Personal life ==
Newton married Frederick Lloyd before she was 20 years old. She was widowed in her twenties. In the United States, she met and married a merchant named W. H. Blackmore. She had two sons.

Eliza Newton died at Bellevue Hospital in New York in February 1882. She arrived at Bellevue the previous January, from her residence at 131 East Twenty-Seventh Street. Her death was due to cirrhosis of the liver, and she was about 45 years old. Minnie Cummings, manager of the New Haven, Connecticut opera house, offered proceeds from a benefit entertainment at her theatre to be used to cover expenses for Newton's burial. The need to raise money for her burial was cited as evidence of need for an actors' fund, to meet such needs.
