= Eliza Gamble =

American writer

Eliza Burt Gamble
- Born: June 4, 1841; Concord, Michigan
- Died: September 17, 1920 (aged 79); Orchard Lake, Michigan
- Spouse: James Gamble (m. 1865)
- Children: William (b. 1871); Helen (b. 1872); Kate (died in infancy)

Eliza Burt Gamble (1841–1920) was an intellectual active in the 19th and early 20th centuries. She was an advocate of the Women's Movement, a mother, a writer, and a teacher from Michigan. Gamble's writings pioneered the use of evolutionary theory as a resource for making claims about women. Her work engaged with Charles Darwin's theory of sexual selection. Her work paid significant attention to the importance of gender in evolution.

== Personal life ==
Gamble was born on June 4, 1841, in Concord, Michigan, to Luther Burt Jr. and Florinda Horton. On June 27, 1843 Luther died and on August 4, 1857, Florinda died. To earn a living Eliza began working as a schoolteacher in public schools in Concord, Michigan. After five years teaching in district schools, Eliza rose to become the assistant superintendent of the East Saginaw high school. On January 4, 1865, she married James Gamble in Grand Rapids, Michigan. Eliza and James had three children, but only two of their children (William Burt and Helen Burt) were still living on June 22, 1900, when a census was taken. William was born in January 1871 and Helen was born on November 1, 1872. Eliza's daughter Kate died in infancy.

Eliza Gamble died at the Cadillac Hotel in Detroit on September 17, 1920.

== Writings ==
Over the course of her career, Gamble wrote three books: The Evolution of Woman (1894), The God-Idea of the Ancients (1897), and The Sexes in Science and History (1916). In these works, Gamble sought to challenge male patriarchy using arguments grounded in religion, science, and history. In The Evolution of Woman and The Sexes in Science and History, Gamble employed close reading and theoretical argumentation about scientific texts to demonstrate women's superiority. The God-Idea of the Ancients, on the other hand, examined religious history to prove that women's position in society was the result of an aberrant historical process.

== Bibliography ==
- Gamble, Eliza (2004) [1894]. The evolution of woman. Open Collections Program at Harvard University: Women and work. Cambridge, Massachusetts: Harvard College Library Digital Imaging Group. OCLC 894638780.
- Gamble, Eliza (1997) [1897]. The god-idea of the ancients, or, Sex in religion. Boulder, Colorado Charlottesville, Virginia: NetLibrary University of Virginia Library. ISBN 9780585237091.
- Gamble, Eliza (1976) [1916]. The sexes in science and history: an inquiry into the dogma of woman's inferiority to man. Westport, Connecticut: Hyperion Press. ISBN 9780883552711.

== See also ==
- Antoinette Brown Blackwell
- Charles Darwin
- Charlotte Perkins Gilman
