= Eliza Joenck =

Brazilian model and actress (born 1982)

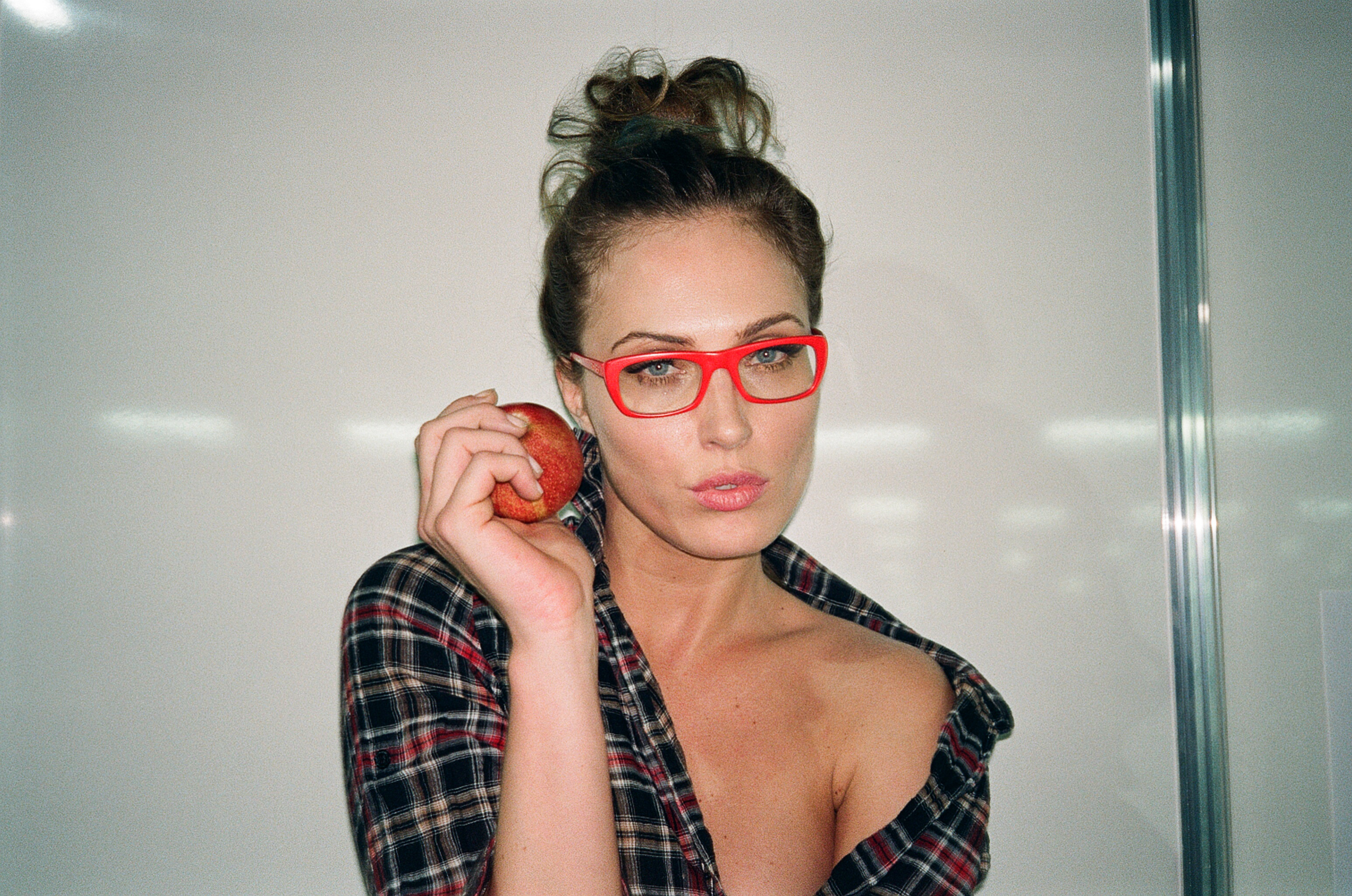
- Joenck in 2011
- Born: Eliza Joenck Martins; January 1, 1982 (age 44); Florianópolis, Santa Catarina, Brazil
- Occupations: Model, actress
- Modeling information
- Height: 1.80 m (5 ft 11 in)
- Hair color: Blond
- Eye color: Blue
- Agency: Group RK9

Eliza Joenck Martins (born January 1, 1982) is a Brazilian model and actress.

== Biography ==
Her career began at age 16 to be discovered by Anderson Baumgartner, co-owner of Way Model. From there began traveling the Brazil and the world. Having already done work for major brands and international brands, such as L'Oréal, Diesel, Fillity, Valisère, Bob Store, Amsterdam Sauer, Equus, Christian Dior, Audi, Victoria's Secret, among others. Was the cover Trip in 2008 and revised status in 2012.

In 2007 participated in the film If all else fails director José Eduardo Belmonte, where she played herself.
