= Eliza Macauley =

British Actress and campaigner (1785?–1837)

Elizabeth Macauley
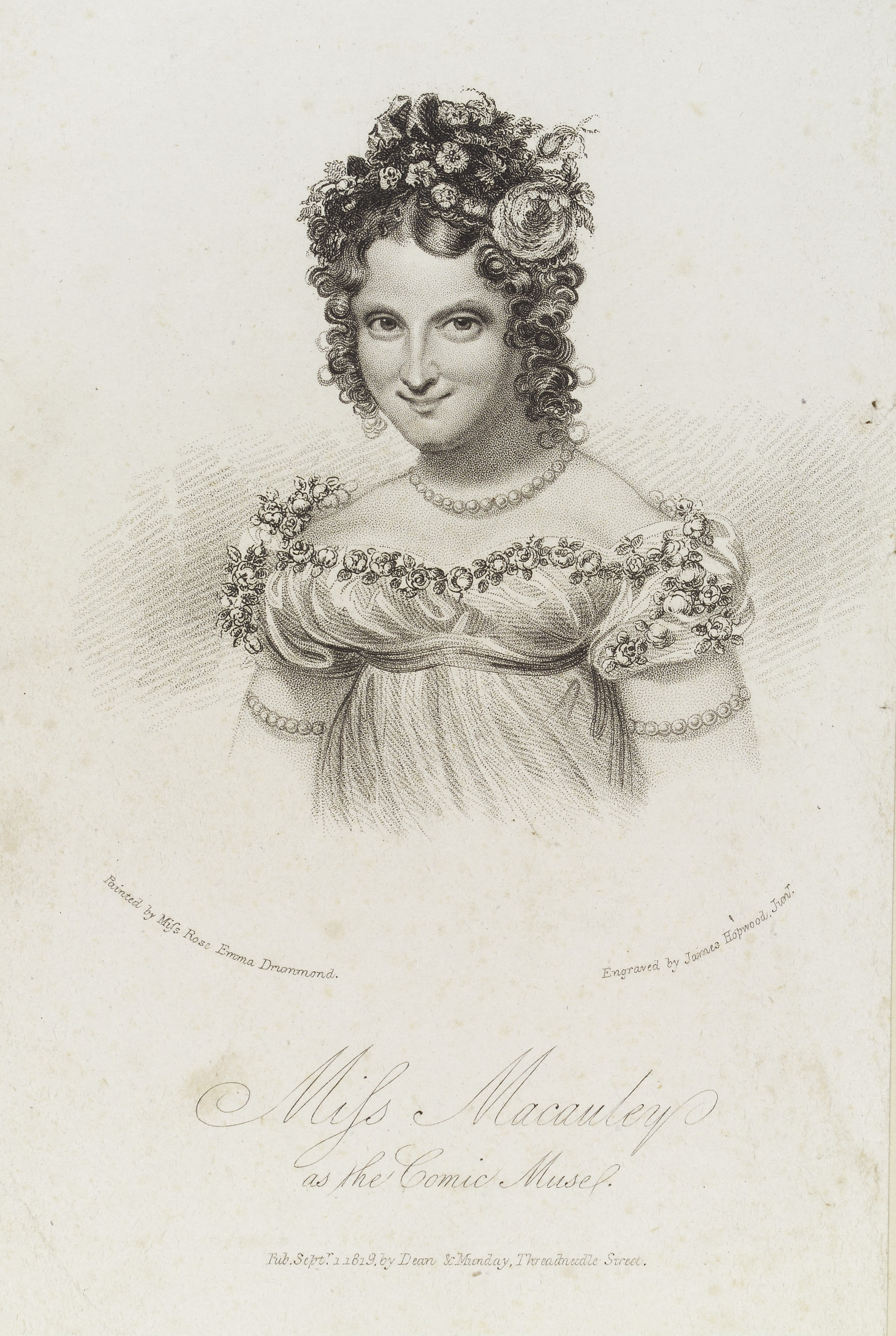
- Portrait of Miss Macauley as the comic musel, 1819 engraved by James Hopwood the Younger, after Rose Emma Drummond
- Born: 1785; York, England
- Died: 22 February 1837 (aged 51–52); York, England
- Other name: Eliza

Eliza Wright Macauley or Elizabeth Macauley (1785? – 22 February 1837) was an actress who came to notice as a socialist writer who campaigned on women's issues and financial reform.

== Early life ==
Macauley was born in York, her father was poor and he died when she was two. She worked for over twenty years as an actress but never making any good money. She started appearing in barns in her home city before she moved to London. She did find work as an actress but it was poorly paid and she failed to be noticed by an impresario. She wrote a melodrama, Marmion, which was produced in Ireland in 1810 and published in 1811. Unemployment caused her to publish tracts denouncing the selfishness of her male colleagues and the philistinism theatre owners after she became unemployed.

The late 1820s found her preaching from the pulpit of a ‘Jacobinical’ chapel in Grub Street, and later to the platforms of Owenite co-operation. She became a solid supporter of the Cooperative movement.

== Involvement in Owenism ==
Owenism in the early 1830s promoted economic self-help of the working class through mutual co-operation. Working together to manufacture, trade, and create utopian–socialist and democratic communities. Women's equality was implicit in these plans. By 1832 she as the manager of the largest labour exchange where people bartered goods and services on the basis of the number of hours that was invested in them. Macauley delivered lectures on financial reform, child development, the evils of Christian orthodoxy, and women's rights. "Women have too long been considered as playthings, or as slaves", she said July 1832, "but I hope the time is at hand, when we shall hold a more honourable rank in the scale of creation". She also offered acting lessons to her fellow socialists, including to a group of French Saint-Simonians visiting London in the early 1830s.

== Writing career ==
Macauley earned small sums paid by the Owenites and she also write small volumes of essays on topics, ‘poetic effusions’, and other such ladylike potboilers and pamphlets denouncing her enemies in the theatre, attacking the magistracy, and defending various patrons against scurrilous detractors. However she wrote "literary pursuits are the most arduous of any … and subject to the most mortifications—particularly for females".

== Debtors' prison ==
She was sent to the Marshalsea prison because of her unpaid debts. In 1835 she was there writing her autobiography which was enabled by the subscribers who had paid to see the resulting book. She died in York, while on a lecture tour, on 22 February 1837.
