= Eliza Wyatt =

American playwright

- Born: Brighton, England
- Occupation: Writer

Eliza Wyatt is an American playwright born in England, who has been part of the Boston theater scene for more than thirty years.

== Life and career ==
Eliza Wyatt completed an undergraduate degree at Boston University in Philosophy and Master of Arts degree in play-writing at Brandeis University. She has had plays produced in Boston, New York City, Los Angeles, London, Ankara, Edinburgh and regional theatres to many favorable reviews. Her plays are politically inspired by contemporary life-problems but follow the classic form of tragedy and comedy.

Wyatt has a number of interests, and has recently devoted herself to sculpture.

== Works ==
=== Full length plays ===
Wyatt's plays have been produced internationally. Selected works include:

- Angela Hitler (The Housekeeper) (1986), became a Susan Smith Blackburn finalist and received the Double Image Helen Warren Meyer production award.
- Chronic Competition (2000)
- Nuncle (2001)
- Techno-frantic Love (2002)
- Gods & Goddesses (2004)
- Flowers of Red (2005/2006)
- Sleep Around Beauty a collaboration with Paul Chi, was the first musical to be video-streamed in 2007 from Pete Townshend’s Oceanic Studios. (Part of the Planet Tree Music Festival, London 2007)
- Alice's World (2009)
- Alice Leaves the Garden (2011)
- Feeding the Beast
- Blue Sky Thinking
- Mirror Images
- Having a Life
- The Assassination of Robert F. Kennedy

=== One act plays ===
Selected works include:

- Bunny (premiered at New Venture Theatre, Brighton, subsequently produced as a short film directed by Brian Kaufman)
- Suicide Queens
- One-Acts by Wyatt
- The Right Decision
- Troubadour Line
- Hunt for Lizards
- Mobiles
- At Home with Hume
- The Accident
- Monologues for Women

== Prizes and awards ==
- Best Playwright Edinburgh Fringe Theare Festival, August 2005, awarded for "Flowers of Red"
- First place in Children's Theatre Category of Moondance International Film Festival in 2011 for Moondance
- Moondance International Film Festival's Columbine Award in 2002 for the radio play, One, Two, Beep....
- Winner at the International Center for Women Playwrights in 2003 for Shut Door.
- Double Image Helen Warren Meyer Production Award for Angela Hitler
- Playwrights Platform's Playwrights As Thinkers Award
- Massachusetts’ Playwrighting Fellowship
- Eugene O’Neill Playwrights Conference
- Mid-West Playwrights Conference

== Publications ==
Wyatt is a published playwright. Published plays include:

- Mirror Images, Athena Press, L.A.
- Blue Sky Thinking, Literature International

== Affiliations ==
- Roxbury Outreach Shakespeare Company, Boston
- Playwrights Platform - Founder of the Playwrights Platform One Act Play Festival, Boston
- New York Public Library Archive
- National Black Theatre Company of England
- International Centre for Women Playwrights
- Healthy Concerts, Brighton, England
