= Eliza Taylor Ransom =

Canadian-born American physician (1863–1955)

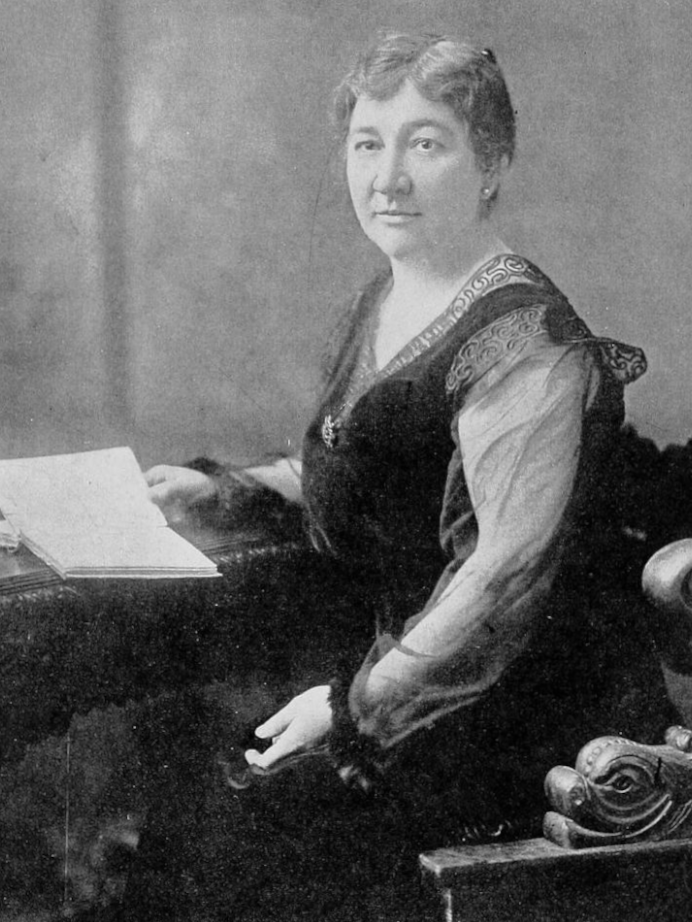
- Born: Eliza Taylor; May 31, 1863; Escott, Ontario, Canada
- Died: June 7, 1955 (aged 92); Aberdeen, North Carolina, United States
- Education: Boston University School of Medicine; Johns Hopkins University
- Occupation: Physician
- Spouse: George W. Ransom

Eliza Taylor Ransom (May 31, 1863 – June 7, 1955) was a Canadian-born American physician who founded the first Twilight Sleep Hospital in the United States after studying the method of painless childbirth in Freiburg, Germany. From 1900 she was associated with Boston University, between 1917 and 1918 with the French Baby Fund, and from 1936 with the Boston Evening Clinic.

== Career ==
A neurologist and a homeopath, Ransom practiced medicine in Boston for forty years and was a part of a new generation of women physicians. As a fixture of the medical community in New England, she argued for women's right to a pain-free labor. After studying the twilight sleep method in Freiburg, Germany, which involves administering a scopolamine-morphine injection, both a narcotic and an amnesiac, into an expecting mother so that they fall into a "twilight-sleep" state to reduce pain while giving birth. In 1914, she established the first twilight-sleep maternity hospital on Bay State Road in Boston, Massachusetts. In an article written by The New York Times in 1915, Ransom recommended that it should be required by federal law that anyone who administers scopolamine should only be able to do so with a special license or course of instruction.

Ransom was a member of multiple medical societies throughout her life, including the Copley Society, Canadian Club of Boston, Boston University Women's Graduate Club, and Massachusetts Homeopathic Medical Society, by whom she was elected president in 1902.

She also wrote many articles in medical journals on the subjects of mental and nervous diseases and of childbirth, including an article for The Washington Post on November 9, 1926, that summarizes the conditions face in a home birth as a plead to provide more precise scientific information for a home that is expecting a child.

Ransom was also an active worker in the woman suffrage movement and a strong supporter of coeducation. In a special newspaper article published by The Washington Post in 1915, she believes that it is just as proper for a woman to court men as men do women. Ransom also declared that it was to the mutual benefit of both genders to wear relatively less clothing to improve blood circulation and overall improve people's general health in a 1920 article titled "Says Both Sexes Wear Too Much Clothing", and that society should encourage friendships between men and women, as written in a 1923 article for the Boston Traveler.

== Personal life ==
Born in Escott, Ontario, on May 31, 1863, Eliza Taylor was the daughter of William G. and Janet Thomson Taylor and was one of four children. She graduated from the Normal School, Oswego, New York, in 1888 and Boston University School of Medicine in 1900, along with postgraduate work at Johns Hopkins University.

Her husband George W. Ransom was a prominent educator, best known in Boston during his lifetime as the master of the Abraham Lincoln School and for organizing the first civics classes in Boston settlement houses in the early twentieth century. They had two daughters.

Eliza Taylor Ransom died on June 7, 1955, in Aberdeen, North Carolina, at the age of 92.
