= Aliza Licht =

American marketing expert and author

Aliza Licht is an American marketing expert and author who specializes in personal brand advising, social media and fashion.

== Early life and education ==
Licht grew up in the Five Towns area of Long Island, New York. Licht wanted to be a plastic surgeon, but joked that she couldn't wear scrubs every day because she loved fashion too much.

== Career ==
After college, Licht worked at Harper's Bazaar and Marie Claire. Licht became an executive for brand marketing and communications at Alice + Olivia, and directed social media and brand experiences for Warby Parker. Licht joined Donna Karan International in 1998 as a publicist and became senior vice president for global communications. She ran the Twitter site DKNY PR GIRL, at first anonymously, and was viewed as an early adopter of fashion industry social media. Licht was called one of "Six Women Who Rule the Fashion World" byTime and one of 23 "Most Innovative Career Coaches" by Business Insider.

Licht told the New York Times that working in the fashion industry could be "an amazing boot camp" as a first step before entering other fields, adding "Fashion people work really hard."

Licht's 2015 book Leave Your Mark was called a "tell-all mentorship book" by Harper's Bazaar.

In her 2023 book On Brand, Licht recommended networking, focusing one's goals, honing one's message, and collecting information on one's perception by others, in order to build self-awareness. Licht suggested making a list of one's skills and areas of expertise, then crossing out any non-preferred activities. She advised promoting other people when posting about oneself, purchasing one's own name as a domain name, and creating a personal website. Licht encouraged introverts to get outside their comfort zone by speaking at industry conferences, moderating panel discussions or going on podcasts.

Licht's tip "start building equity in your name by introducing yourself with your full name, not where you work" was featured as one of Forbes' "19 Essential Personal Branding Tips From Top Global Experts".

== Awards ==
- Fashion 2.0 Award, Best Twitter and Best Blog by a Fashion Brand, 2012
- American Book Fest, Best Book of 2023, Business: Marketing and Advertising

== Works ==
- Leave Your Mark: Land Your Dream Job. Kill It in Your Career. Rock Social Media, Grand Central Publishing, 2015. ISBN 9781455584130
- On Brand: Shape Your Narrative. Share Your Vision. Shift Their Perception, Union Square & Co., 2023. ISBN 978-1454949060
- "Building Social Capital When You Work Remotely", Harvard Business Review, 2023.
- "Being a Jewish Activist Wasn't on Brand for Me," On Being Jewish Now: Reflections from Authors and Advocates, Zibby Publishing, 2024. ISBN 979-8991140232

== Activism ==
Following the October 7 attacks, Licht contributed an essay called "Being a Jewish Activist Wasn't on Brand for Me" to a 75-writer anthology On Being Jewish Now: Reflections from Authors and Advocates. The anthology was assembled by Artists Against Antisemitism and edited by Zibby Owens.
