= Eliza Brown Newton Smart =

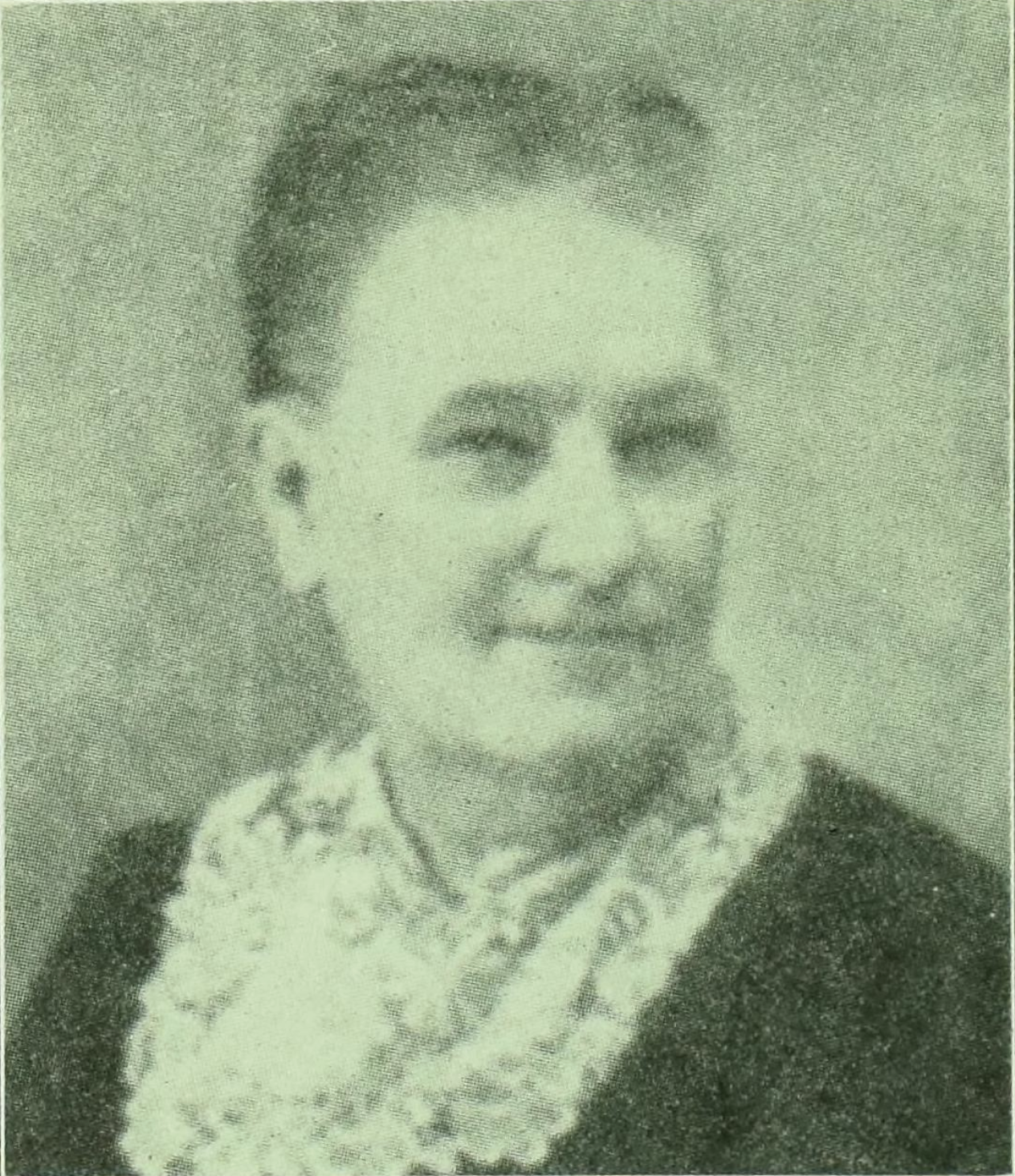
Smart in a 1930 publication.

Eliza Brown Newton Smart (1844–1930) was a Portugal-born British missionary and temperance reformer. She served as President of the Madeira Woman's Christian Temperance Union (WCTU).

== Biography ==
Eliza Brown Newton was born at Funchal, Madeira, February 25, 1844. Her father was the British consul at Funchal. Her parents were English missionaries.

She was educated at a private English school in Funchal, and in the Portuguese public schools of Madeira.

Smart devoted her life to the mission field, working in Madeira since 1878.

On September 27, 1879, she married William George Smart, of Cardiff, Wales, one of the three men who were engaged in missionary work in Funchal under the direction of the Board of Foreign Missions of the Methodist Episcopal Church. In 1898, Mr. and Mrs. Smart were recognized as missionaries of the Madeira and Cape Verde Islands Mission for the Missionary Society of the Methodist Episcopal Church. In 1908, they were associated with the West Central Africa Conference of the Methodist Episcopal Church Missionary Society.

When Mary Greenleaf Clement Leavitt visited Madeira, in 1893, she appointed Smart president of the Madeira WCTU, which office she held at least until 1929. At the World's Woman's Temperance Convention at Geneva, Switzerland, in 1903, Smart presented the Portuguese flag. Throughout her long years of missionary service, she was very active in the cause of temperance among the sailors on board ships stopping at the port of Funchal, as well as among the children in the Portuguese schools of the island.

Eliza Brown Newton Smart died in Funchal, November 2, 1930, at the age of 85.
