= Eliza Townsend (politician) =

American politician

Elizabeth 'Eliza' Townsend is an American politician from Maine. A Democrat from Portland, Townsend was elected to the Maine House of Representatives for four consecutive terms between 1992 and 2000. After leaving office, she became the executive director of the Maine League for Conservation Voters. During the governorship of fellow Democrat John Baldacci, Townsend served as Commissioner of the Maine Department of Conservation. Since 2011, Townsend has served as Executive Director of the Maine Women's Lobby.

In 2019, Townsend endorsed incumbent Portland mayor Ethan Strimling for re-election but Strimling finished in third place.

== Personal ==
Townsend grew up on a farm in rural Maine. She graduated from McGill University and earned Master of Fine Arts in Drama from Carnegie Mellon University in 1985. Her father, Bill Townsend, was described as "a forefather of Maine’s environmental conservation movement" at the time of his death in 2016.
