= Eliza Buckley Ingalls =

American temperance activist (1848-1918)

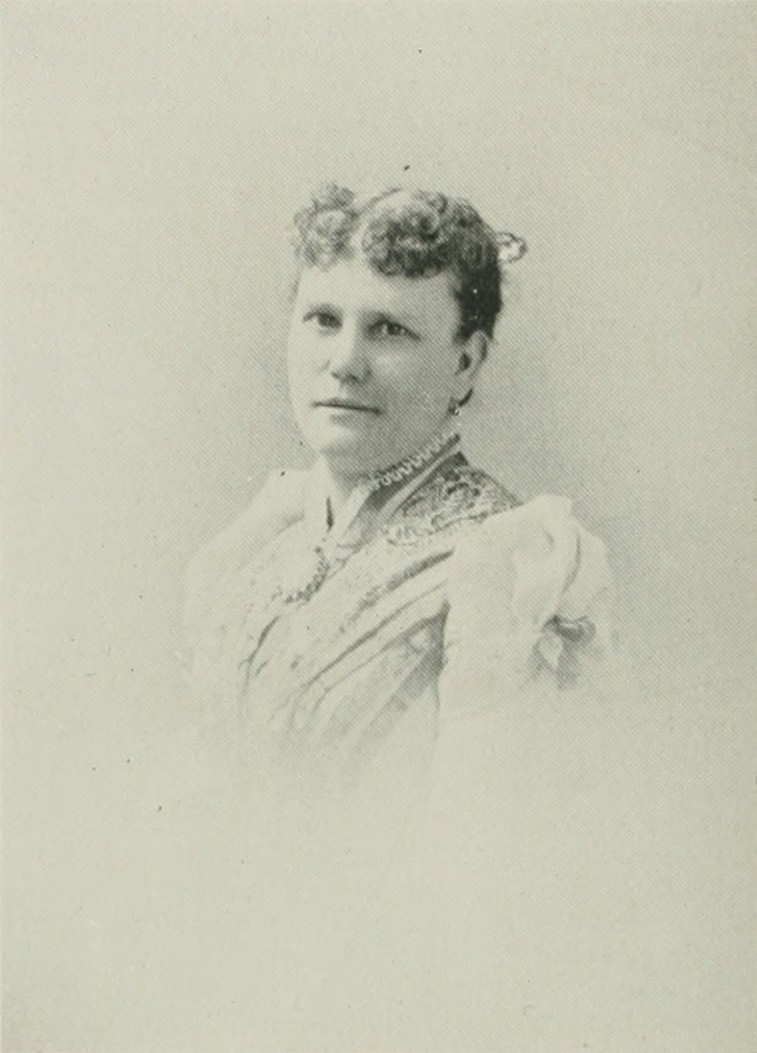
Portrait from a "A Woman of the Century"

Eliza Buckley Ingalls (August 24, 1848 – February 9, 1918) was an American temperance activist. Active in local and national activities of the Woman's Christian Temperance Union (WCTU), Ingalls served as President of the St. Louis WCTU for 27 years (1891-1918); and as Superintendent of the National WCTU's Anti-Narcotics Department for 10 years.

== Early life and education ==
Eliza ("Lide") Buckley was born at Cherry Hill Farm, 10 miles (16 km) south of St. Louis, Missouri, August 24, 1848, where the early years of her life were spent.

She received her early education in the local public schools, later taking a college course in Philadelphia, Pennsylvania.

Interested in temperance work early in life, she was admitted by special dispensation into the International Organisation of Good Templars (IOGT) at 14 years of age.

== Career ==
In 1880, she married Fred H. Ingalls, a merchant in St. Louis.

"Work against other narcotics has gone steadily on, but the cigarette habit is of such great importance that other things seem to sink almost into insignificance." -Eliza B. Ingalls

The WCTU was organized in St. Louis by Frances Willard in 1879, Ingalls becoming secretary. Later, she was made vice-president-at-large of the Missouri State WCTU, a position which she filled for 11 years when Clara Cleghorn Hoffman was its president. She was then elected president of the St. Louis District WCTU, and was continued in that office for 27 years.

She served as superintendent of the Anti-Narcotics Department of the National WCTU. Her special mission was the eradication of tobacco in all forms. She was assisted in her work by State superintendents, and the results were shown by the enactment of laws in nearly every State in the Union prohibiting the sale of tobacco to minors. She was determined and aggressive, holding to a strict accountability for each one to whom a task was assigned. Much of Missouri's legislation upon the subject was due to her efforts.

By appointment of successive governors of Missouri she served on the State Board of Charities for many years, and was one of the local commissioners for the National and World's WCTU exhibit at the Louisiana Purchase Exposition, held in St. Louis in 1904. Her incessant warfare against narcotics was effectively promoted by her skill in authorship and pictorial illustration. She wrote a series of pamphlets, presenting in telling form the testimonies of businessmen and physicians as to the effect of the cigarette habit in spoiling a business career and undermining health.

== Personal life ==
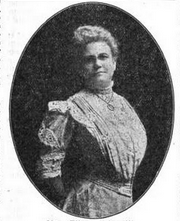
Eliza Buckley Ingalls

Contemporaries whom she entertained at her home included Frances Willard, Lady Henry Somerset, and Anna Adams Gordon.

Her last message to the women of the St. Louis WCTU, a few days before she died, was typical of her nature: "Give the women my love and tell them to push on." Ingalls died February 9, 1918, after a continued illness of almost three years. Nelle G. Burger wrote Ingalls' obituary in The Union Signal.
