= Eliza Potter =

African-American hairdresser and writer

Eliza Potter (c. 1820–1893) was an African-American hairdresser and writer in Cincinnati, Ohio. In 1859, she published her autobiography, A Hairdresser's Experience In High Life.

Potter, a free black woman of mixed race, grew up in New York City. Upon marriage, she moved to Philadelphia and gave birth to two children. According to her memoir, she left her marital home to go "roving". She traveled widely, including in Europe, and learned her trade. Potter's autobiography provides an intimate glimpse of the experiences of a mixed-race beautician at the hands of her white employers in Cincinnati. She also traveled widely and recorded the various social customs of New York City, Saratoga, Canada, Paris, and London. Her writing style was described as "gossipy" and "sharp-tongued."

== Works ==
1859: A Hairdresser's Experience in High Life
