= Eliza Crisp =

American actress

Eliza Crisp (1822–1873) was an American stage actress.

She was married to the actor-manager William Henry Crisp and emigrated with him from Great Britain to the United States. Her spouse was the manager of Athenaeum theatre in Mobile, Alabama and the theatre in Montgomery, Alabama and their theatre company toured between Georgia and Alabama prior to the American Civil War. Eliza Crisp was a well known and successful actor, but she was also a director and is known to have directed numerous plays as well as acting in them.

After the outbreak of the civil war, the Crisp theater company was one of the few which did not leave the South but stayed during the war. She personally prevented a theatre ban in Atlanta by donating to the war effort. After the war, the company toured Texas.
