= Eliza Cook (physician) =

American physician & suffragist (1856–1947)

- Born: February 5, 1856; Salt Lake City, Utah
- Died: October 2, 1947 (aged 91); Nevada
- Education: Cooper Medical College
- Occupations: Physician, Activist for women's suffrage
- Known for: Nevada's first licensed woman doctor

Dr. Eliza Cook (February 5, 1856 – October 2, 1947) was an American physician and female state-licensed medical doctor in the U.S. state of Nevada. She also worked as a pharmacist and wrote articles about health issues for magazines and medical journals.

== Biography ==
Cook was born on February 5, 1856, in Salt Lake City, Utah to John and Margaretta Gratrix Cook. Her mother, Margaretta, left her father due to his stinginess and his belief in polygamy. In 1870, Eliza, her mother, and Eliza’s sister Rebecca moved to Sheridan, Nevada. Without a school to attend, Eliza was educated by her mother and whatever books she could find. One book, the title of which is unknown, was about home remedies and got her interested in medicine.

Dr. H. W. Smith hired Cook to help nurse his wife when she had puerperal fever. Cook’s skills impressed him so much that he hired her as his assistant. This gave her access to his medical library, where she read everything she could read.

In 1884, Cook earned her Medical Degree from Cooper Medical College at Stanford University in San Francisco. In 1891, she attended the Women's Medical College of Philadelphia, and the following summer, took a post graduate course at the Medical College in New York City. She earned her Nevada medical license in April 1899, the first year that they were issued by the state.

As a doctor, Cook performed surgeries, set broken limbs, and delivered many babies. She also worked as a pharmacist and wrote articles about health issues for magazines and medical journals.

Cook was a member of the American Woman Suffrage Association and the Women's Christian Temperance Union. She was a founding member of the Nevada Women’s Equal Suffrage League and was elected the inaugural vice president of the organization in October of 1895. After her term was over, she became president of the Douglas County Equal Suffrage League, and continued to serve both organizations by circulating petitions, writing to legislators, and publishing letters in the newspapers. She served as Vice President of the Nevada Equal Suffrage Association.

Never married, Cook resided in Mottsville, Carson Valley, and Douglas County. She died on October 2, 1947 and is buried in Mottsville Cemetery in Douglas, Nevada.
