= Eliza Haycraft =

American brothel owner and philanthropist

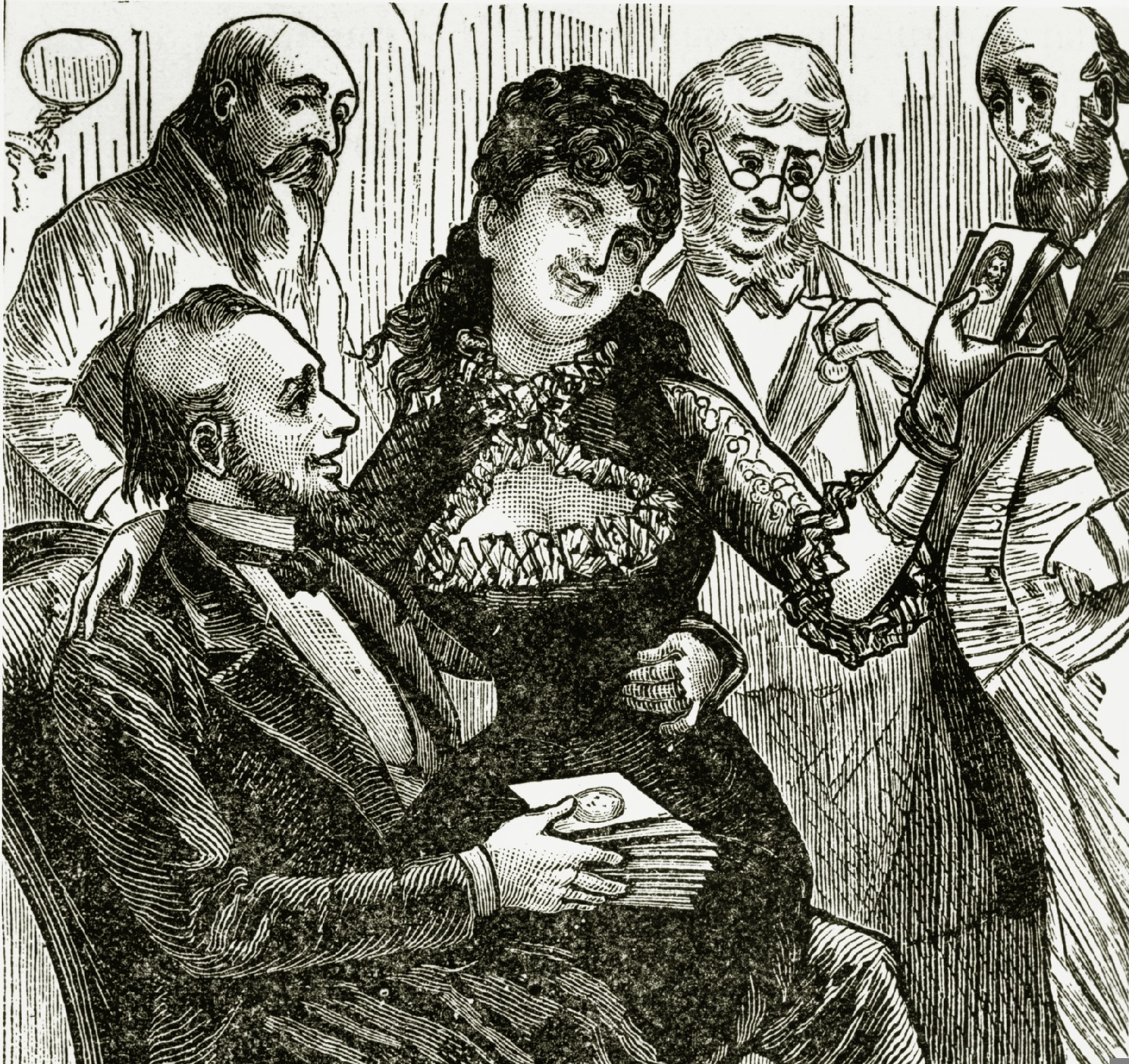
- Born: February 14, 1820
- Died: December 5, 1871 (aged 51); St Louis, Missouri
- Occupations: Brothel madam and philanthropist

Eliza Haycraft ( February 14, 1820 – December 5, 1871) was a wealthy brothel madam and philanthropist, who donated money to the widows and orphans of the American Civil War.

== Biography ==
Haycraft was born on February 14, 1820. She moved to St. Louis, Missouri, from Callaway County, Missouri, in 1840, reportedly arriving in a canoe. She fled her original home because her parents cast her out after she was seduced by a lover at the age of twenty. She arrived in St. Louis destitute, with only the option of selling herself as a courtesan.

Haycraft took advantage of the brief legalization of prostitution in her city, and soon became the owner and manager of a brothel, doing well in business despite her inability to read and write. She signed her name with an "X", and avoided using banks.

She bought commercial and residential property, and rented it back out. By the time the Civil War had started, she had two working operations in the continually-growing St. Louis. At the end of the war, she had five. Throughout her career, she was known for being a generous philanthropist, refusing to turn away the city's poor, offering them help and financial aid. Her timing was impeccable, because St. Louis grew from 36,000 to 350,000 people between 1840 and 1870, and countless young men passed through on their way west. However, the Civil War was her biggest boon. When the Civil War started, Haycraft had two working establishments. By the time it finished, she had five, and had also bought commercial and residential property, signing the deeds with an X because she was unable to write her name.

Haycraft earned $12,500 in 1867, enough to be listed as one of "Our Solid Men" on the list of men who earn more than $1,000 per year published each year. In spite of her inability to read, Haycraft was smart enough to build a vast brothel empire in St. Louis, which she rented to her fellow madams.

Haycraft used several strategies to build her brothel empire. She not only rented out her properties to fellow madams, but she also provided bail for them and their girls when needed. By leveraging her wealth and status, Haycraft effectively protected her business from periodic police busts, making it more difficult for authorities to constrain prostitution in the area. In The St. Louis Post, there was an ongoing discussion about how to deal with the growing prostitution in the city during the war, which turned whole blocks over to the trade, encroaching on respectable homes, churches, schools, and hospitals. According to the Union military during the war, decriminalizing prostitution and regulating it instead was the solution that was adopted. Houses were taxed to cover the costs associated with the regular weekly medical inspections of prostitutes for sexually transmitted diseases and the costs associated with maintaining hospitals for women with active cases of the disease.

Haycraft owned at least 19 pieces of real estate. During a prostitution-legal era when brothels were common, she was one of St. Louis' wealthiest people. She was also known for her philanthropy, providing assistance to the poor of the city.

Her stature made it possible for her to purchase a home from the Chouteau family, one of the city's most prominent families, when she retired in 1870. The house was on St. Charles Street between Fifth and Sixth streets. Haycraft died there on December 5, 1871, at the age of 51. She left an estate valued at over a quarter million dollars, about 30 million U.S dollars today. More than 5,000 people attended her funeral, and she was buried without a marker in the Bellefontaine Cemetery. Her grave is in the center of a 20-plot lot she bought. The other plots remain empty.

== In popular culture ==
In February 2019, auditions were announced for the world premier of Madam!, "a new musical based loosely on real events" of Haycraft's life with music, words, and book by Colin Healy to debut August 2019. Madam runs at Bluff City Theater in Hannibal MO from August 15 to August 24, 2019.
