= Orange Street Presbyterian Church =

Historic church in Arkansas, United States

- Muses Cultural Arts Center
- U.S. National Register of Historic Places
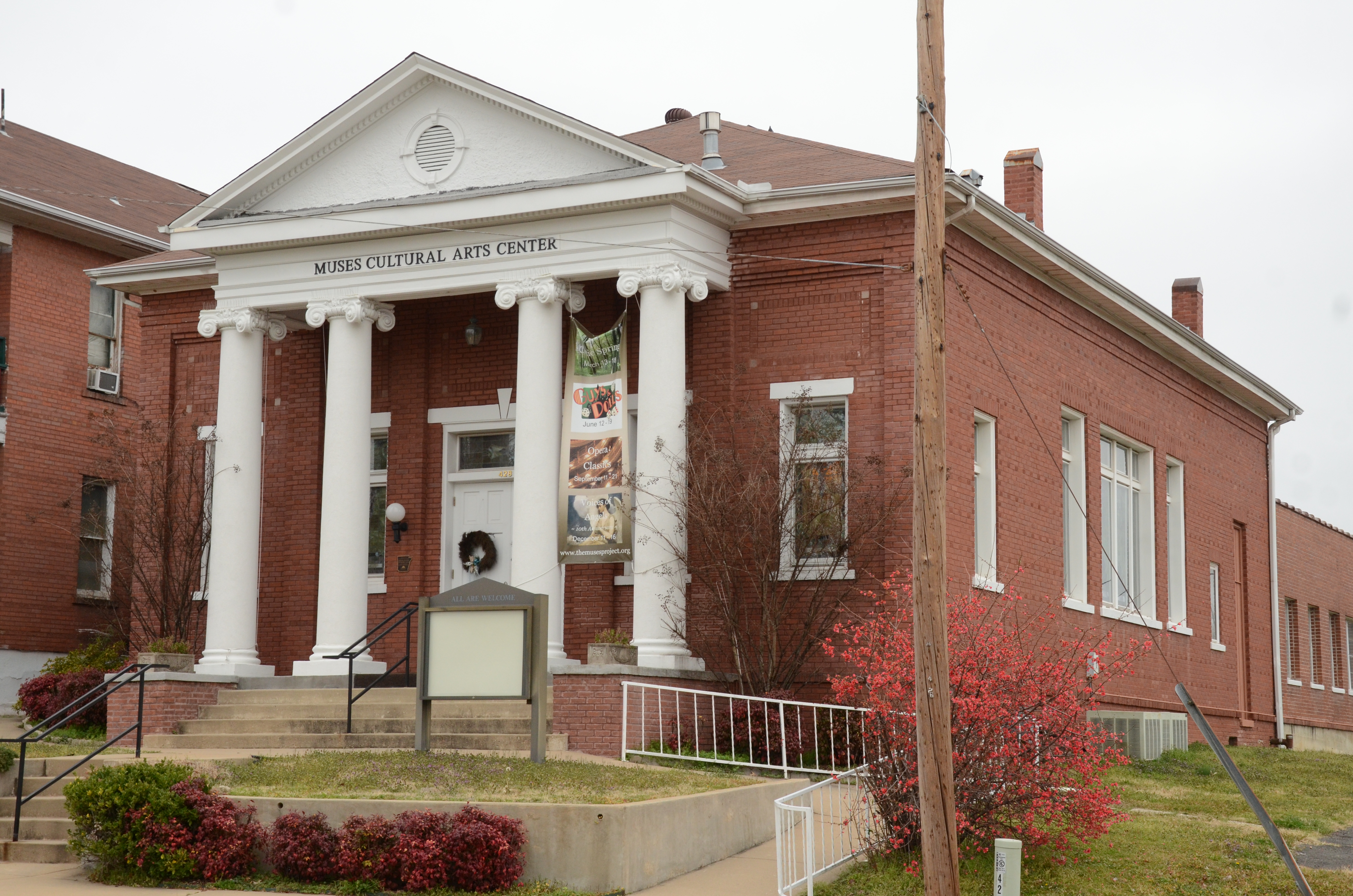

- Location within Arkansas Location within the United States
- Location: 428 Orange St., Hot Springs, Arkansas
- Coordinates: 34°30′20″N 93°3′22″W
- Area: less than one acre
- Built: 1913
- Architectural style: Classical Revival
- NRHP reference No.: 02000259
- Added to NRHP: March 28, 2002

The Muses Cultural Arts Center, originally known as Orange Street Presbyterian Church, is an historic building at 428 Orange Street in Hot Springs, Arkansas. The building is a single-story brick structure, with a gable roof and concrete foundation. The front facade has a four-column Greek temple portico, with Ionic columns and a fully pedimented gable with an oculus vent at its center.

== History ==
The church was built in 1913 by a Presbyterian congregation founded in 1903, and was known as the Orange Street Presbyterian Church. It was the congregation's third church, the first two succumbing to fire, and indebting the organization. It occupied the building until 1961, when it moved to new quarters, selling this building to the local Christian Science congregation. The building is one of Hot Springs' best examples of Classical Revival architecture. In 2013, it was announced that The Muses Project was buying the building as a home for its cultural arts center, and the church was moving to Central Avenue.

The building was listed on the National Register of Historic Places in 2002.

== See also ==
- National Register of Historic Places listings in Garland County, Arkansas
