= Eliza Soutsou =

Greek writer (1837–1887)

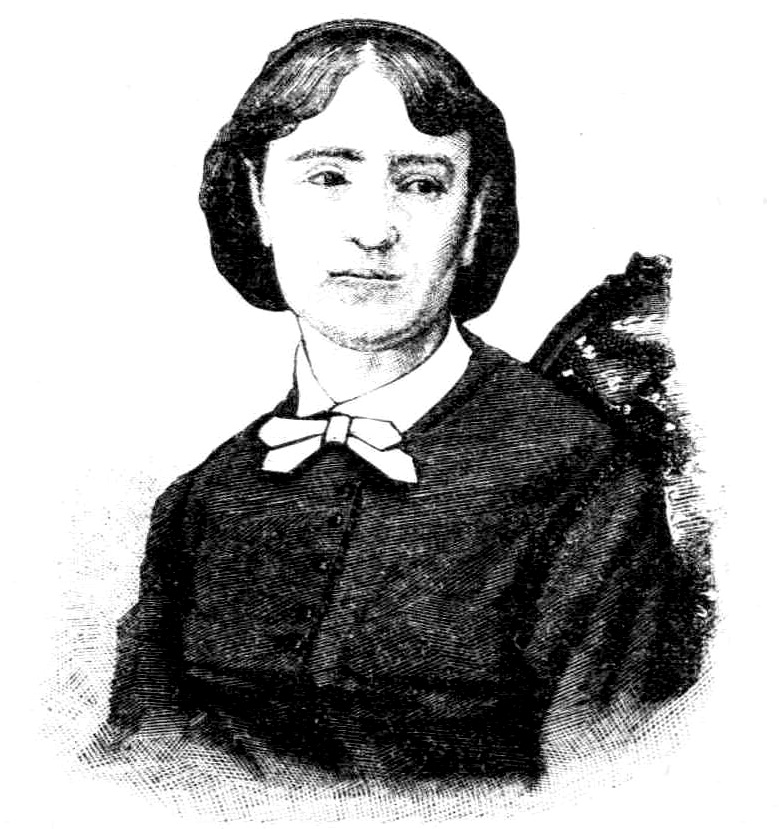
- Born: 1837; Athens, Greece
- Died: January 1887 (aged 49–50); Athens, Greece
- Occupation: Writer
- Known for: Translations

Eliza Soutsou (Greek: Ελίζα Σούτσου, Athens, 1837 – Athens, January 1887) was a Greek writer of the 19th century. She dealt mainly with translations.

== Biographical information ==
Eliza Soutsou was born in Athens in 1837. She was the daughter of the Phanariot general Skarlatos Soutsos and Elpida ("Nadina") A. Kantakouzinou. She received significant education and was distinguished for her broad knowledge of languages. She dealt mainly with translations of which some of them were published in separate books and others in newspapers and magazines of the period. Among others, Soutsou translated "The Magdalene" by Jules Sandeau (1879), "La charité privée à Paris" by Maxime du Camp (1884), "The Palermo Capuchins Monastery" by Alexandre Dumas, and "Les Martyrs de la science" by Tissandier. At the same time she collaborated with various publications such as Estia, Poikili Stoa, Evdomas, Revue du Monde, etc.

She died unmarried in early January 1887 in Athens from a heart disease that compounded her health from the previous year. Her funeral was held in the presence of the Prime Minister Charilaos Trikoupis and the Minister of Foreign Affairs Stephanos Dragoumis while her relative and professor Ioannis Soutsos gave the funeral oration.

== Bibliography ==
- Κούλα Ξηραδάκη, Φαναριώτισσες, εκδόσεις Φιλιππότη, Athens, 1999.
