= Ida L. White =

19th century Irish writer

- Born: Eliza Jane Cameron; Portrush, Northern Ireland
- Occupation: Irish poet

Eliza Jane White (fl. 1862–1901), who published as Ida L. White, was an Irish poet, republican, feminist, atheist, and anarchist.

== Life ==
Eliza Jane White was born Eliza Jane Cameron, and was from Portrush, Northern Ireland. White lived at The Tryst, Lyle Hill, Ballymena. She was a feminist and republican.

She published under the name Ida. Alongside Frances Browne, Elizabeth Willoughby Treacy, and Mrs Ralph Varian, White is regarded as part of the Irish Weaver tradition. John Hewitt described White and Varian as "remarkable if scarcely relevant ladies". He was more admiring of White's politics. Two of her volumes of poetry were published in 1874 and 1890 respectively, though the material appears to have been written before 1870.

She was the wife of George White (died 1876), editor and founder of the Ballymena Observer. They married on 1 December 1862. She had three daughters, Violet Victoria, Ethelwynne Alberta, and Pansy. After her husband's death, she moved to Belfast, and later to Brompton, London. She declared herself an atheist, and became estranged from her daughters when the co-trustee of her husband's will, a dean, commenced a chancery case against her which lasted eleven years. She was imprisoned in Holloway, London in early 1888, and spent some time living in Paris as an exile. It is also recorded that she made a public attack on the Czar of Russia. The attack involved White posting the heir to the Russian throne a fragment of rusty chain while he was visiting London, alongside a published letter. The chain was a metaphor for the "tyranny and cruelty which prevailed in the throughout the Russian Empire." She was quoted in The Sun in 1893, saying "I make war on emperors and kings." She was inspired by the writings of George Kennan and from meeting Feliks Volkhovsky. While in Paris she wrote for the French anarchist newspaper, Le Libertaire, and in 1895 described attempting to use her home in Ireland as a safe house for exiled London anarchists. It is thought she died in Paris in the early 20th century.

In his 1912 dictionary of Irish writers of English verse, David James O'Donoghue observes that "she appears to hold very advanced opinions".

== Bibliography ==
- Lady Blanche, and Other Poems, by Ida, London, Hamilton Adams; and Belfast; C. Aitchison, 1875.
- The Three Banquets, and Prison Poems, London, 1890.
- The Flowers Of Lyle And Elegiac Verses London, Simpkin, Marshall, Hamilton, Kent & Co., 1901.
