= Eliza Parks Hegan =

Canadian nurse (1861–1917)

Eliza Parks Hegan (1861 – February 18, 1917) was a Canadian nurse. She was matron of the Victoria Public Hospital from 1890 to 1892 and then became the matron at Saint John General Public Hospital from 1892 to 1895. Hegan worked at the New York Polyclinic Medical School and Hospital for three years and she set up a private hospital in Saint John, New Brunswick in 1898. She was a contributor to the founding of the first local nursing association, the Graduate Nurses' Society of Saint John General Public Hospital, in 1903, and became its fifth president six years later when it became the Saint John Graduate Nurses Association.

== Biography ==
She was born in 1861, possibly in Saint John (Portland), New Brunswick. Her mother was Eliza Hegan, née Black, and her father, John Hegan, came from Belfast and was one of the top dry goods merchants in partnership with his brother-in-law in Saint John. Hegan was brought up to be a Presbyterian and she went to a private school. Arlee Hoyt McGee wrote in the Dictionary of Canadian Biography that going to a private school "may have provided her with a better education than that obtainable in the free schools of the city" and that her early childhood years "were probably influenced by strong Victorian values". She was one of ten women chosen to study nursing for a month at the Saint John General Public Hospital's newly established training school in 1888. Hegan agreed to study there for two years to learn about the workings of nursing from lecturers and matrons. Thus she graduated from the school in 1890, the sixth student to do so.

Hegan travelled to Fredericton to become the matron of the 20-bed Victoria Public Hospital in 1890 after the previous matron was fired for using abusive language towards the hospital's trustees. In 1892, she returned to Saint John and was appointed the matron at Saint John General Public Hospital on a three-year term lasting until 1895. Hegan recommended that the matron's role be divided with the appointment of a head nurse, which was achieved in 1895. Controversy was created by her when in 1893 she did not sign the graduation certificates for four nurses who had transgressed the hospital's regulations. The board ruled in favor of the graduates and Hegan resigned in 1895 even though she received the support of two physicians. For the following three years, she spent her time working as a night supervisor at the New York Polyclinic Medical School and Hospital, at which she got typhoid fever.

Following her return to Saint John in 1898, Hegan began a private hospital, which was one of three in the city. She contributed to the establishment of the first local nursing association, the Graduate Nurses' Society of Saint John General Public Hospital, in 1903. Hegan was not one of its 16 charter members and her name is not frequently referred to in the early minutes taken of its meetings. She served as the successor's Saint John Graduate Nurses Association fifth president from March 1909 when it began admitting every nursing graduates living in Saint John and was its registrar for a few years. After a provincial organization incorporated itself as the New Brunswick Association of Graduate Nurses in 1916, Hegan assisted in writing up its bylaws. She was one of 16 people on its provincial council to help with the writing of the bylaws and failed to get elected to the council.

Hegan died of liver cirrhosis in Canada on February 18, 1917.
