= Tormented (2009 Salvadorean film) =

- Directed by: Sergio Rosa
- Written by: Sergio Rosa
- Produced by: Esteban Rodas
- Starring: Patricia Argueta; Jackeline Hernández; Marielos Aquino; Heriberto Marquez; Jasmín Chahín
- Music by: Harold Cáceres
- Release date: August 2009
- Running time: 9:21 mins
- Country: El Salvador
- Language: Spanish

Tormented (Atormentada in Spanish) is an animated short film written and directed by Sergio Rosa. Produced by El Salvador-based Do Studio, it was projected in select theaters as part of the Film and TV Workshop by Escuela de Comunicaciones Mónica Herrera in November 2009. The short film is considered to be the first professional computer-animated film ever produced in El Salvador, and part of the emerging salvadorean film industry.

== Plot ==
The film opens with Mariana, a young lady in her early 20s. Mariana is coming home when her car breaks down, so she goes to a nearby to ask for help. A strange-looking lady opens the door and, not completely understanding what she is saying, lets her in. While they are inside, the woman acts completely cold and robotic, and asks Mariana to wait in a small living room till her husband arrives.

She waits there for a long time. The man finally arrives and while he is asking her about her problem they hear an argument between the woman and her daughter upstairs. He offers to go outside and see if they can find a solution for her problem, and when they are near the door he asks her to go ahead since he has to go get his tools first. As soon as Mariana grabs the door knob, she hears a strange noise, and the house starts to change. The lights go out, the walls burn down quickly and a lot of the furniture disappears. At the end, a big plank drops and hits Mariana in the face.

After she recovers, she tries to move the debris blocking the door but she cannot do it. She hears a little girl's laugh, and then that same voice asks her to go upstairs. Mariana has no choice but to go up, and as soon as she arrives she sees a figure running down the hall. Mariana follows it into a room, where she finds the woman, dressed in a big sleeping gown. Eliza, the little girl, comes from behind, and Mariana witnesses a small argument between the two. In that argument, it is hinted that the man is abusing the little girl, while the mother is willingly ignoring that situation. Both the woman and the little girl disappear, suggesting that they were in fact ghosts. A devilish-looking version of the little girl appears, and runs away while pushing Mariana to the side. Mariana again runs after her, going back downstairs. While she is downstairs she sees a light shining under one of the doors, and while she is checking it out the doorknob begins to shake. Then something starts hitting the door from the other side, so the scared Mariana runs away, hiding herself inside the kitchen.

In the kitchen, Mariana is trying to figure out a way to go out, since all exits are blocked. Suddenly, the man enters through the supposedly blocked back door. She asks him for help, and after a brief struggle he throws her onto the table and rapes her. The little girl appears and explains she wants her to go through the same pain her father would make her suffer. After that, the man throws Mariana to the floor and they both leave her there. The house falls apart, a lot of debris falling on her. Mariana opens her eyes, and a series of flashbacks are displayed, revealing she had a car accident in front of the house, and that everything she had seen since the beginning was in fact a near-death experience. She closes her eyes and the film ends.

== Cast ==
Actor	Character
Patricia Argueta	Mariana
Jackeline Hernández	Eliza
Marielos Aquino	Mother
Heriberto Marquez	Father
Jasmín Chahín	Zoe

== Production ==
The short film began production in early February 2009 and reached completion in mid-May 2009. Being part of the Film and TV Workshop, the ECMH picked up the short film's domestic distribution rights for one year and it's slated for release on October 23, 2009.

== Early screening ==
On September 26, "Atormentada" was screened in a special event organized by Festival Icaro 2009. There it was selected as one of the animated films to represent El Salvador during the festival on November.
