= Eliza White (missionary) =

Missionary and prominent member of women's civic activism in New Zealand

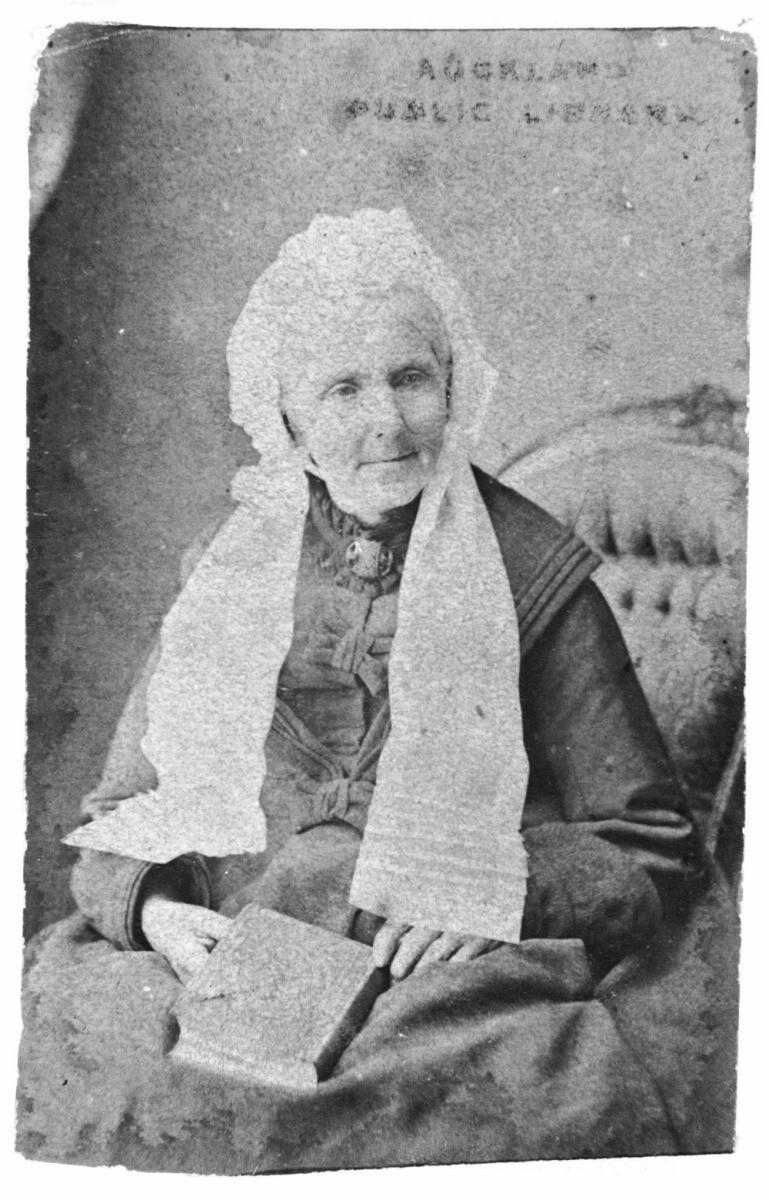
- Eliza Leigh White c1860s
- Born: Eliza Leigh; 11 July 1809; Earith, Huntingdonshire District, Cambridgeshire, England
- Died: 28 February 1883 (aged 73); Auckland, New Zealand
- Other name: Mata Waiti
- Known for: missionary, suffragist, women's rights
- Spouse: Rev. William White

Eliza White (née Leigh; 11 July 1809 – 28 February 1883) was a Wesleyan Methodist missionary to New Zealand and leader in establishing a Ladies Christian Association in Auckland. This organisation was a predecessor to the Auckland Young Women's Christian Association. Her journal, archived at St. John's Theological College in Auckland, provides a unique first-hand account of the life of an English woman evangelist in New Zealand.

== Early life ==
Eliza Leigh was born on 11 July 1809 in Earith, Huntingdonshire, England. Her parents Elizabeth and Thomas Leigh were Non-Conformists who attended Wesleyan services, and she joined the Wesleyan Methodist Church at sixteen. By this point the Wesleyan Methodists had long been supporting the effort to promote the marriages of male missionaries living in non-white communities around the world, and the letters from missionary wives abroad were regularly read at church meetings. The Wesleyan Methodist Missionary Society begun in 1813 together with the interdenominational British and Foreign Bible Society (founded in 1804) connected the religious fervor of evangelism with the teaching of reason, happiness and civilisation. When Rev. William White, a Methodist missionary from New Zealand, visited a nearby village to preach and recruit a wife, Eliza took up the challenge. She told Rev. White and his companion, Rev. Thomas Buddle that she had been influenced by a minister's wife "the niece of the celebrated Fletcher of Madeley, and one of the most noted women of John Wesley's time." Her role model, Mary Bosanquet Fletcher was a popular preaching Methodist woman in Shropshire, and her example of Methodism carried her through a life of active charity work, visitation among the most needy and schoolteaching. She and Reverend White were married on 30 June 1829 in Bluntisham, Huntingdonshire.

== Life as a Missionary Wife in Māngungu ==
William and Eliza White sailed to New Zealand, taking many months to finally arrive on 30 January 1830 at the recently established Māngungu Mission in the Hokianga Harbour. Her first home was in a raupō hut near the Mission House where Rev. John Hobbs lived with his wife, Jane Broggref Hobbs. Besides growing accustomed to domestic work in a colonial hut, Eliza White took up teaching the local children.

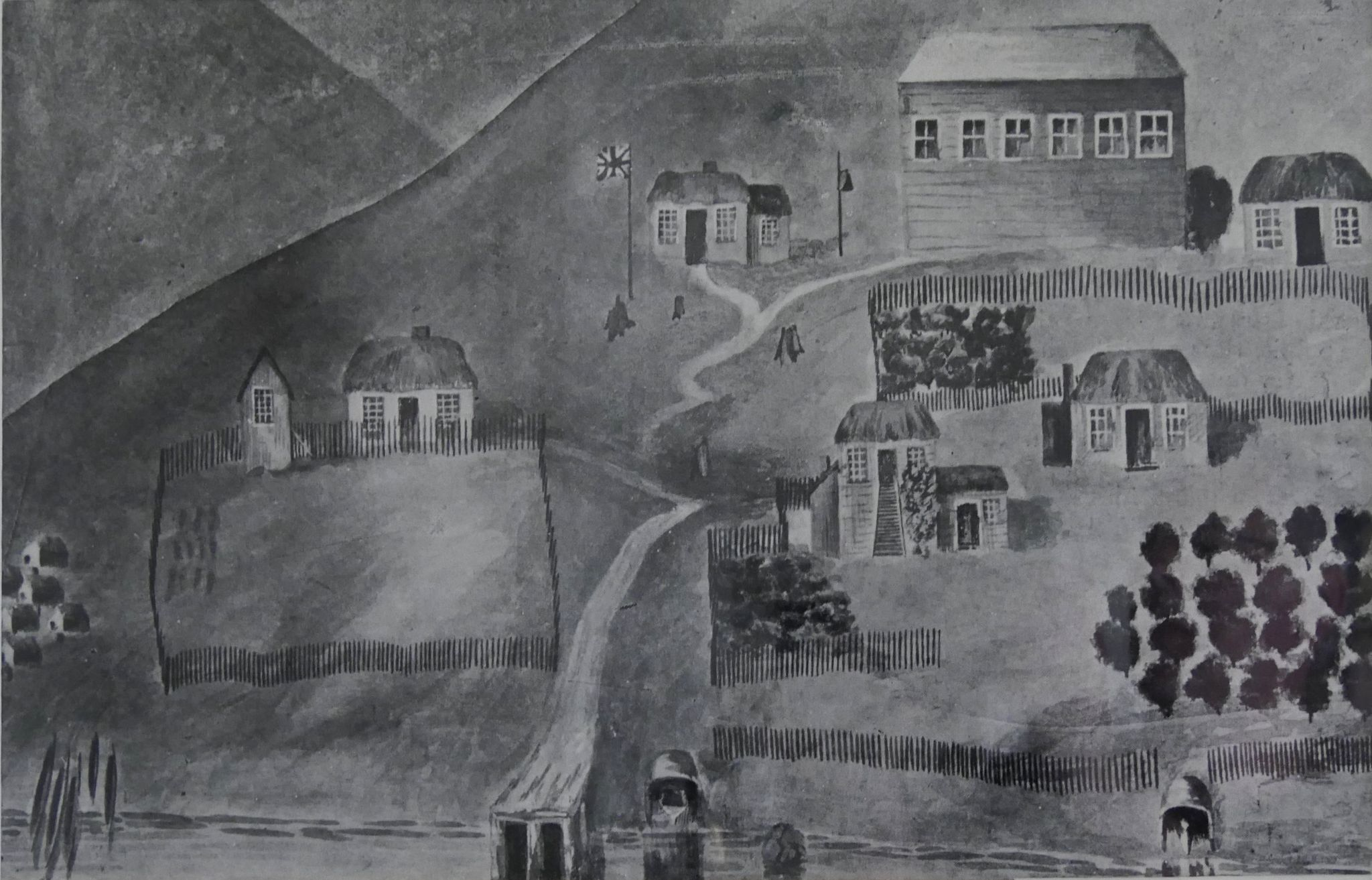
Sketch by Emma Hobbs before the mission house was destroyed by a fire on 1st of September 1838

Eliza White's first child was stillborn on 3 April 1830. Her second child, William Leigh White, died as an infant in August 1831. In January 1833, a third baby—a girl—died, strangled by the umbilical cord. On 1 August 1834, John Ebenezer White was born—he lived to adulthood. Meanwhile, Eliza White wrote of her frustrations as a novice teacher:

20 February 1832. A day of much trial and vexation, the Native boys so very insulting, I could not bear it. We leave all that is dear to us on earth for their sake and they do all they can to irritate and make us angry.

Eventually, Eliza White became fluent in te reo Māori, and she began to manage as many as ten Māori girls training in English-style washing, cleaning and sewing. By 1836, the last year of her journal, Eliza White recorded that seventy women attended prayers with her on Sunday. The rest of the White's children lived to adulthood: Joseph White (born in 1835), Thomas Leigh White (born 1836), and Eliza Leigh White (born 1837). During this time, the mission had grown in congregants - reports of 1000 or more Māori attending worship - and a sawmill post with support for the local Māori's timber trading. However, there were complaints about Rev. White's adulterous conduct with Māori women, and the Church Missionary Society sent Nathaniel Turner and his family to replace the Whites. The White family sailed to England for a short visit for him to plead his case with the Wesleyan authorities, but he was dismissed as a missionary—and so was Eliza White, by association since her missionary work had never been officially acknowledged. They returned, after their daughter's birth, in 1838 to New Zealand where they lived in a house near the Māngungu Mission House. In a controversial move, William White continued to preach and support the Māori as a consultant and trader. Meanwhile, Eliza White ran a school that included the children of Rev. White's brother and the children of Rev. James and Mary Wallis.

== Life in Auckland ==
In 1845 the Whites moved to Auckland to escape the violence growing over land ownership around the Bay of Islands. Eliza and her four children sailed with the other refugees aboard H.M.S. Victoria, a gun brig. They attended the High Street Methodist Church, and in honour of her churchwork, a portrait of the family hung in the chapel. One of her sons, Joseph, must have returned to Māngungu since he died there in 1858 at the age of 23 when kicked by a horse. Her younger son, Thomas "Leigh" White, married Jane Jesson in 1864.

William White died of a heart attack at his home on Vincent Street in Auckland on 25 November 1875. He was 83. His younger son, T. Leigh White, continued in his father's entrepreneurship, striking out on his own in 1882 to become a land agent. and public accountant, serving on the board of the Devonport Steam Ferry Company, holding shares in a Thames goldfield, and exploring new industries such as a deep sea fishing and fish preserving company.

=== Ladies Christian Association ===
In 1878 Eliza White was leading a Bible reading class out of her home on Vincent Street when she decided to establish the Auckland Ladies Christian Association. Her original class of eight girls quickly grew larger as the activities expanded beyond singing and Bible study. The group began formally visiting the sick and the elderly poor in the Lunatic Asylum, and holding night school for children who were living on the street. The group would also send out public announcements about Dorcas meetings to organise the process of gathering and handing out clothing to indigent immigrants. They also offered mothers' meetings in impoverished areas of the city to support the health and education of women with young children. Elize White continued to offer her home on Vincent Street as the meeting place for the association.

== Death and legacy ==
Eliza Leigh White, the unmarried youngest child of Eliza and William White, died in 1882. About this time, hard of hearing and over 70 years of age, her mother grew ill.

YWCA Logo

Eliza White died in Auckland on 28 February 1883, at age 73, after a long illness. By "special desire of the deceased" all were requested not to wear mourning clothes.

Her ever-expanding group of women and girls in the Auckland Ladies Christian Association followed the lead of Dunedin (established in 1878) and Christchurch (established in 1883) to create a Young Women's Christian Association in 1885. A public meeting was held on 18 April 1884 by the leaders of the Young Men's Christian Association who proposed a branch specifically for women that would include:

"(1). Boarding, refreshment, and reading rooms; (2) holding occasional social gatherings; (3) assisting those out of employment, and those also in employment; (4) forming singing, sewing, reading, and other classes; (a) formation of classes for Biblical instruction, and devotional meetings; (6) providing a home for young women when funds shall be sufficient.

This meeting was not well attended and despite the advocacy of YMCA president Reverend Joseph Sidney Hill, the other men present were not convinced a new organisation just for women was needed. Led by Marianne Leachman and her sister Lucy Hill, the first committee meeting of the Auckland YWCA was held on 8 June 1885 in the social room of the YMCA on the corner of Wellesley and Albert Streets.

== See also ==
- YWCA in the Pacific
