= Paora (kiwi) =

Kiwi (hatched 2019)

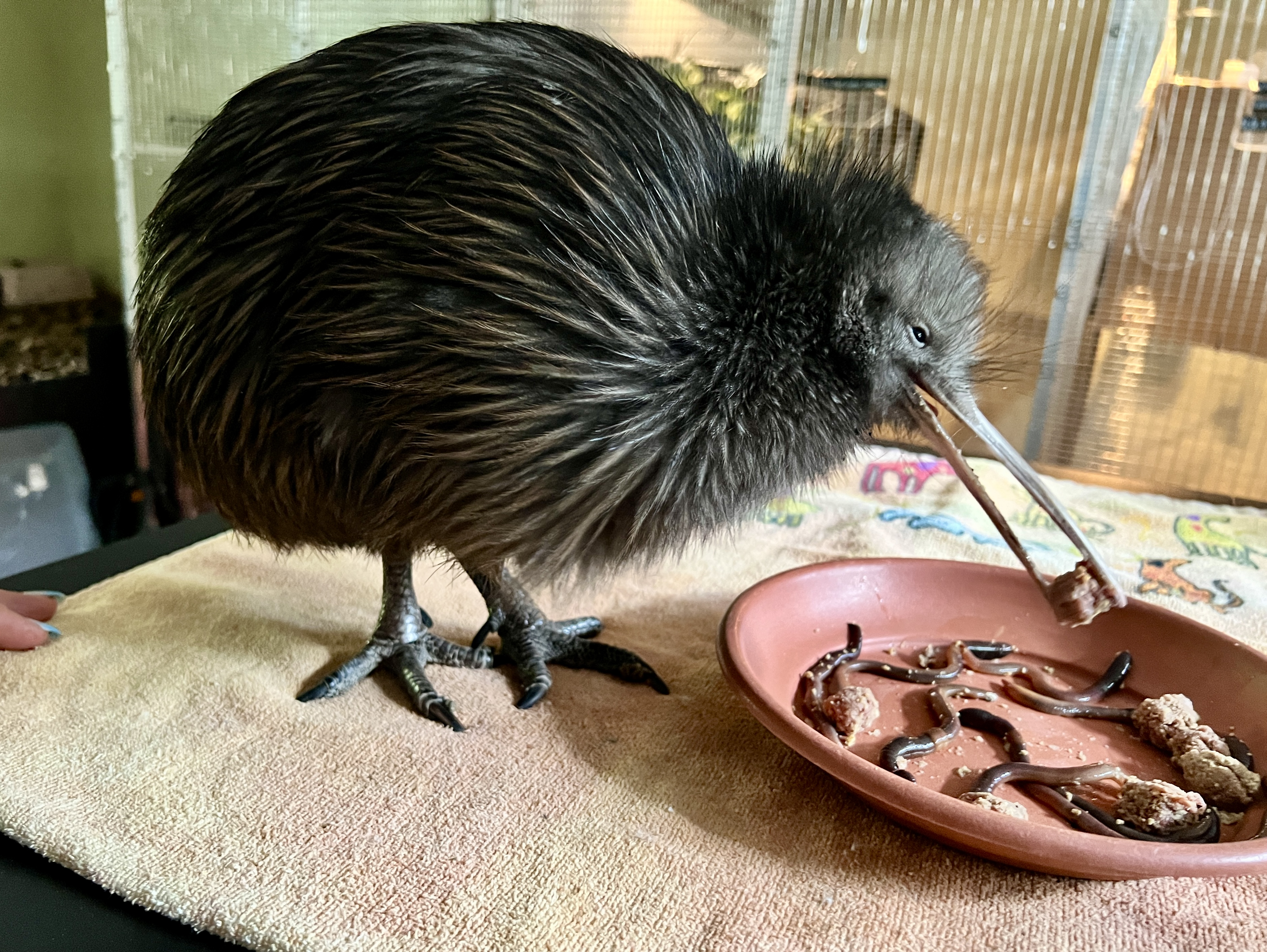
- Paora having a snack in 2024
- Species: Brown kiwi
- Sex: Male
- Hatched: 9 April 2019 (age 7); Zoo Miami, Florida, U.S.
- Known for: Mistreatment by zookeepers
- Residence: Zoo Miami
- Named after: Paora Haitana

Paora (Māori pronunciation: [ˈpaɔɾa]; hatched 9 April 2019) is a North Island brown kiwi that was the first kiwi to be born in the U.S. state of Florida, after his parents were loaned from New Zealand, to the Smithsonian National Zoo. He currently resides at Zoo Miami and gained widespread attention in May 2023 after social media videos showing him being mistreated went viral.

The videos showed Paora being stroked by the public, near loud noises, away from plantlife, and under bright sunlight or lights, despite kiwi being nocturnal birds. One video showed what Newshub described as the zoo using Paora's "need for darkness as a gimmick", and showed him in daylight running to his box, after which the zookeeper opened the door to expose him to light again.

After the videos received widespread attention, Zoo Miami goodwill ambassador Ron Magill apologised, saying that "We have offended the nation of New Zealand", and the zoo immediately stopped offering the kiwi encounters. The zoo stated that, in future, Paora will be kept in quietness and relative darkness during the day, out of the public view. After the incident, the zoo started building a new habitat for Paora, which has been authorised by the New Zealand Department of Conservation and charity Save the Kiwi.

== Life ==
Before Paora was hatched, his fertilised egg was transferred to Zoo Miami in March 2019 as part of a loan with the Smithsonian Institution and with the support of the New Zealand government. His parents were given to the Smithsonian National Zoo and Conservation Biology Institute. Paora hatched on 9 April 2019 and became the first kiwi to hatch in the US state of Florida. In November 2019, Paora had a blessing and naming ceremony, in which he was named after conservationist and iwi (tribe) leader Paora Haitana. The ceremony was attended by the New Zealand Ambassador to the United States, Rosemary Banks. Shortly afterwards, Stuff described Paora as having a "celebrity status". Paora remains under the ownership of New Zealand and Māori, but cannot travel to New Zealand due to biosecurity risks.

== Mistreatment ==
In May 2023, social media footage of Paora's treatment at the zoo went viral. These videos showed examples of public kiwi encounters that had been advertised on the zoo's website and social media page, which were held four times a week at 12.30 p.m. for about US$25 (NZ$34–36) per person. One video showed visitors stroking Paora on his back and neck, with the caption "he literally was like a little puppy", and other videos showed Paora being posed for selfies. A zookeeper in one video asserted that he enjoyed being petted. Zookeepers were also shown "pushing Paora's head to the tabletop [and] scratching his whiskers".

The videos showed Paora in areas with loud noises, no plant life, and in daylight or under bright artificial lights, despite being a nocturnal bird. Newshub wrote that zookeepers in videos appeared to be "using his need for darkness as a gimmick". In one video Paora, in daylight, ran to his box, and then the zookeeper opened the door to expose him to light again, saying, "He'll stand there until it gets dark before he goes in the box and then you wait like five seconds and like magic he'll be ... so he wants to be in the dark and go back to sleep".

The New Zealand Department of Conservation's Kiwi Best Practice Manual states that kiwi "must not be regularly taken out of their burrows just for the purposes of allowing people to see and touch them." The manual says that kiwi already being held for other purposes such as rehabilitation, relocation, or health assessment, may be pat gently on the back by the public. But it states that the public must not touch the kiwi's head, which is what was seen in the videos. Handling kiwi in New Zealand is strictly regulated, with "strict certification" being required. However, these regulations do not apply to Paora because he was hatched in the United States.

== Response ==
=== To videos ===
After the online videos received widespread attention, the zoo experienced backlash from the public. This included complaints, an email campaign directed at the zoo, and the creation of several petitions to 'save Paora', with one gathering almost 12,000 signatures. Bird conservationist Robert Webb said that Paora having his eyes closed in the videos of him being patted was a sign of being "terrified". Due to the stress caused to Paora, Webb said that he "wouldn't mind betting in six months he'll be dead". Natalie Jessup, the general manager of Endangered Species Foundation, said that "the footage was quite shocking". Kiwi conservationist Simon Hall said that the public being able to touch Paora "doesn't seem quite right". The Department of Conservation discussed the issue with the American Association of Zoos and Aquariums.

=== From Zoo Miami ===
Zoo Miami apologised on 23 May 2023, saying that Paora is normally kept in quietness and "relative darkness" during the day, out of the public view. Within 24 hours of the video going viral, the kiwi encounters were discontinued and the zoo stated that they would build a new habitat for Paora in the zoo's aviary "while respecting and supporting his natural instincts". They said that the habitat would be used to educate the public about kiwi, but without visitors handling the birds. Zoo Miami goodwill ambassador Ron Magill apologised, saying that "We have offended the nation of New Zealand". When Magill saw the videos, he told the zoo's director that "we have offended a nation". He had an interview on the television show Breakfast to apologise, as well as on AM.

=== After the zoo's response ===
New Zealand Prime Minister Chris Hipkins said that it was good that the zoo acknowledged that they had mistreated Paora, and that the zoo was "taking it seriously". He added that the public reaction "shows a lot of Kiwis [New Zealanders] take pride in our national bird when they're overseas." National leader Christopher Luxon said, "A fantastic back down from the zoo – to make the right decision". Not everyone was assured that the kiwi would be looked after well enough. Paora Haitana, for whom the kiwi is named, said that he was "not sure if Miami Zoo has the expert or qualified people to be able to deliver that for Paora the kiwi", and said that experts from New Zealand should help the zoo. The New York Times wrote that "this incident has revealed the potential pitfalls of what might be called 'kiwi diplomacy'", a kiwi version of China's panda diplomacy.

== After the controversy ==
In December 2023, Paora was described by Stuff as "thriving and enjoying a relaxed life in his secluded area away from the public", as the public kiwi encounters had stopped being offered and fluorescent lights had been eliminated from Paora's shelter. It has glass that removes 80% of light, and the lighting system is able to be adjusted to red, which is invisible to kiwi. There will be a pool that is about 6 inches (15 cm) deep. The kiwi exhibit will replace a gift shop, and construction was planned to start in January 2024. The charity Save the Kiwi helped with the build of the new shelter, and it was approved by the New Zealand Department of Conservation.

The zoo issued a statement in June 2026, 20 months after construction was due to be completed, explaining that Paora had not moved into the new enclosure due to delays.

== See also ==
- List of individual birds
