= Red-knobbed imperial pigeon =

- D. r. rubricera, at Walindi, New Britain, Bismarck Archipelago

Conservation status
- Least Concern (IUCN 3.1)

Scientific classification
- Kingdom: Animalia
- Phylum: Chordata
- Class: Aves
- Order: Columbiformes
- Family: Columbidae
- Genus: Ducula
- Species: D. rubricera

Binomial name
- Ducula rubricera (Bonaparte, 1854)

Species of bird

The red-knobbed imperial pigeon (Ducula rubricera) is a bird species in the family Columbidae. It is found in the Bismarck Archipelago and the Solomon Islands archipelago. Its natural habitat is subtropical or tropical moist lowland forests.

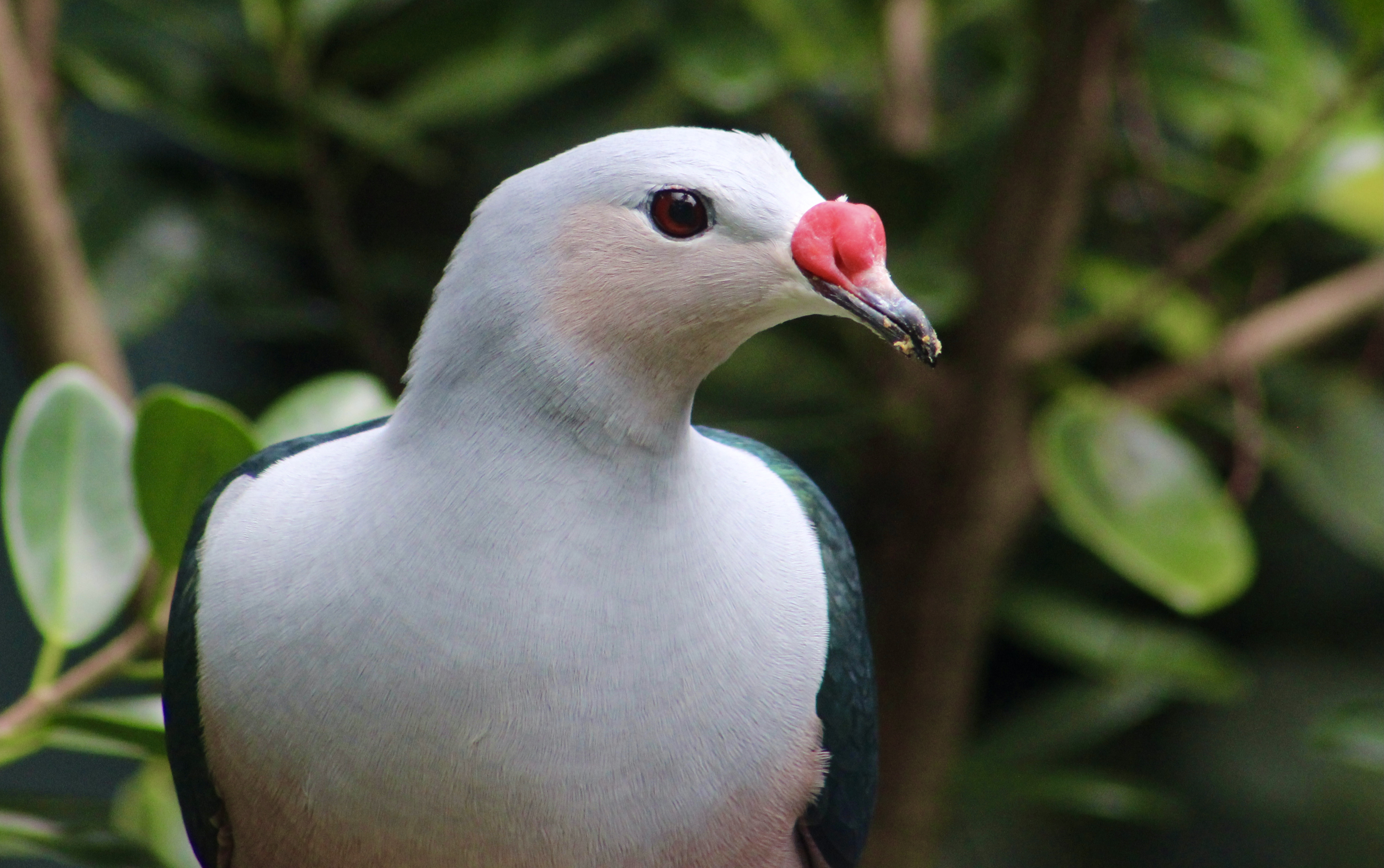
A red-knobbed imperial pigeon at Zoo Miami.

== Taxonomy and systematics ==
Ducula rubricera rubricera (at the time known as Carpophaga rubricera and split from Ducula rubricera rufigula).

The red-knobbed imperial pigeon was likely first written about by René Lesson in 1826, though he misidentified it as Pinon's imperial pigeon, a fact which did not go unnoticed by the writers of The Birds of New Guinea and the Adjacent Papuan Islands later in the century.

The red-knobbed imperial pigeon was first formally described as Globicera rubricera by Charles Lucien Bonaparte in 1854. Its initial description was in Comptes rendus, volume 39, page 1073.

Throughout the pigeon's taxonomic history, it has been additionally known by names including Carpophaga rubricera, Carpophaga lepida, and Muscadivora rubricera.

Two subspecies are accepted:

- D. r. rubricera (Bonaparte, 1854): the nominate subspecies, found throughout the pigeon's Bismarck Archipelago range. Differs from subspecies D. r. rufigula mainly by having a pale pink neck, nape, breast, and crown.
- D. r. rufigula (Salvadori, 1878): found throughout the pigeon's Solomon Islands archipelago range. Differs from the nominate mainly in having a grey neck, nape, breast, and crown. Pale pink above the breast is restricted to the throat and cheeks.

The type specimen for the nominate subspecies was collected in New Ireland, while the type specimen for subspecies D. r. rufigula was collected in Wanga, on Makira (previously known as San Cristóbal Island).

== Etymology ==
The red-knobbed imperial pigeon as depicted by Paul Louis Oudart in Bonaparte's 1857 Iconographie des pigeons.

The species' generic name, Ducula, comes from the Nepalese word for imperial pigeons, dukul. The specific epithet, rubricera, comes from Latin ruber, meaning red, and Medieval Latin cera, meaning wax (referring to the cere). The subspecific epithet for the subspecies D. r. rufigula is derived from Latin rufus, meaning red, and gula, meaning throat, owing to the subspecies' noticeable pinkish throat surrounded mostly by grey.

Other outdated common names for this species include New Ireland fruit-pigeon and red-cered pigeon.

== Description ==
D. r. rufigula on the Willamuz Peninsula.

The red-knobbed imperial pigeon is a large pigeon with a pale pink to grey head, chestnut belly, and emerald green and bronzy wings. Its namesake feature, the red knob on the upper mandible, is the enlarged cere of the bird. Juveniles lack this enlarged cere, looking similar to Finsch's imperial pigeon. However, they lack the white eye ring and tail band of that species, and their reddish underside is paler than that of Finsch's imperial pigeon.

The two subspecies differ mainly in coloration from the breast upwards. Ducula rubricera rubricera, the subspecies found in the Bismarck Archipelago, has a mostly pale pink breast, neck, nape, and crown. Ducula rubricera rufigula, the subspecies found in the Solomon Islands archipelago, has wholly light grey plumage from the breast upwards, with the exception of the throat and the cheeks.

== Distribution and habitat ==
The red-knobbed imperial pigeon is endemic to Melanesia, being found throughout the Bismarck Archipelago and the Solomon Islands archipelago. Within the Bismarck Archipelago, it is found in New Ireland, New Britain, New Hanover, Umboi, Lolobau, Watom, Duke of York, Bougainville, and the island groups of Lihir, Tanga, Feni, and Tabar. In the Solomon Islands, it is found in at least Makira, the New Georgia Islands, Malaita, Santa Isabel, Choiseul, and Guadalcanal.

It is typically found in both primary and secondary lowland rainforest, but can be found up to 1200 metres on Guadalcanal and Kolombangara. Though it is tolerant of degraded forest, gardens, cocoa plantations, and even urban areas, it is known to avoid heavily degraded or deforested areas and palm oil plantations.

== Ecology ==
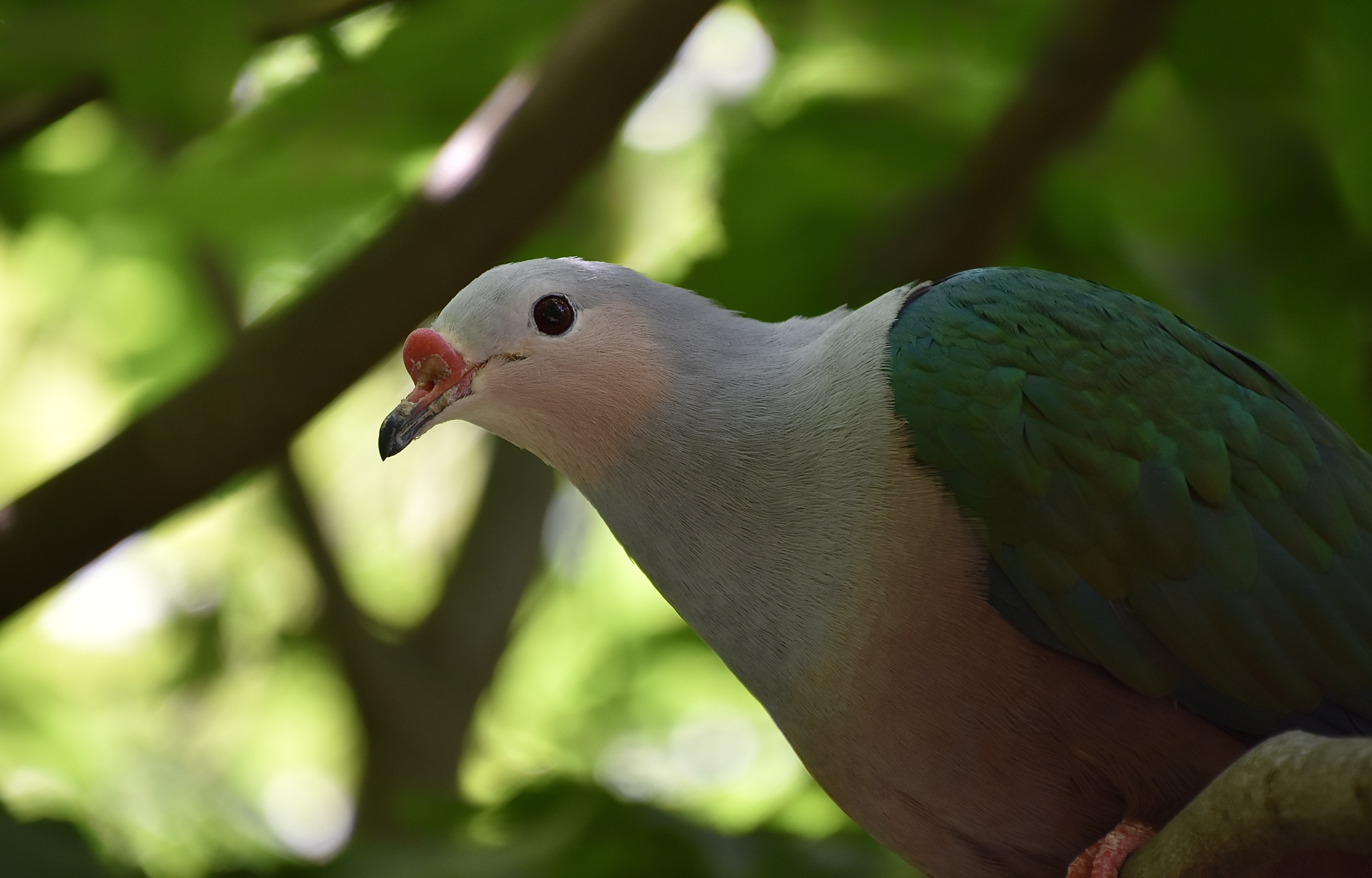
D. r. rufigula at Prospect Park Zoo.

Red-knobbed imperial pigeons are frugivorous, eating fruits such as those from the galip nut tree. They feed in the canopy, usually alone or in pairs, though they have been seen in groups of over 30 individuals, and are known to form smaller foraging groups of 5-10 individuals as well. This species is also known to forage with the claret-breasted fruit dove in New Georgia.

Courtship has been observed during July-August. The pigeons bob their heads while cooing or whooping, and they may jump during the whooping displays. They also engage in flight displays.

Red-knobbed imperial pigeons have been observed to nest in at least February, July, and August. In some areas at least, they nest in colonies within low vegetation. They lay only one egg.

== Status ==
The red-knobbed imperial pigeon is listed as Least Concern by the IUCN, with a tentative population estimate of 150,000-750,000 mature individuals. From 2008 to 2021 it was listed as Near Threatened due to deforestation in New Britain. Despite the 2021 downlisting, the red-knobbed imperial pigeon is still suspected to be in decline. Threats include deforestation and habitat conversion for palm oil plantations.
