= Zoo Miami =

Zoo in Miami, Florida, United States

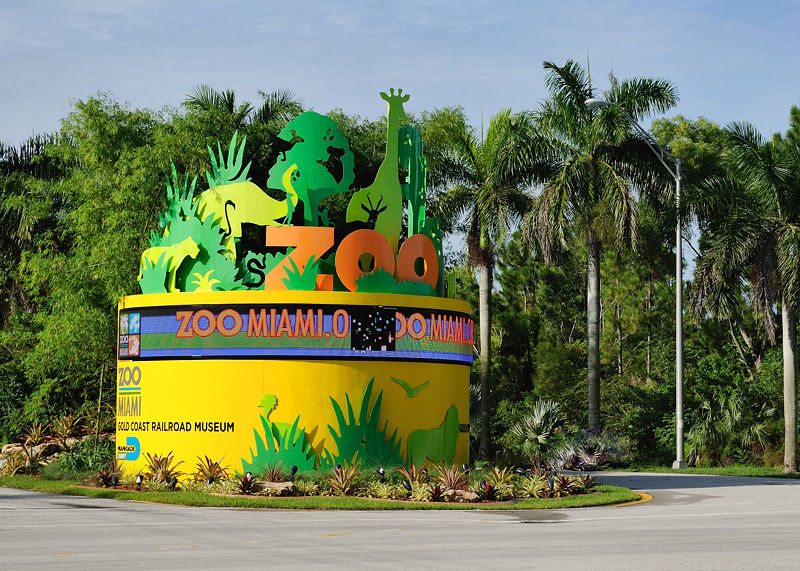
- Entrance from State Road 992
- Interactive map of Zoo Miami
- 25.61°N 80.40°W
- Date opened: 1948; 78 years ago (Crandon Park Zoo); July 4, 1980; 46 years ago (Miami MetroZoo)
- Location: Miami-Dade County, Florida, United States
- Land area: 750 acres (304 ha) (324 acres (131 ha) developed)
- No. of animals: 3,000
- No. of species: 500
- Annual visitors: 1+ million
- Memberships: Association of Zoos and Aquariums
- Major exhibits: 100
- Website: www.zoomiami.org

The Miami-Dade Zoological Park and Gardens, also known as Zoo Miami, is a zoological park and garden in Miami and is the largest zoo in Florida. Originally established in 1948 at Crandon Park in Key Biscayne, Zoo Miami relocated in 1980 as Miami MetroZoo to the former location of the Naval Air Station Richmond, southwest of Miami in southern unincorporated Miami-Dade County, surrounded by the census-designated places of Three Lakes (north), South Miami Heights (south), Palmetto Estates (east) and Richmond West (west).

The only tropical zoo in the continental United States, Zoo Miami houses over 3,000 animals of around 500 species on almost 750 acres (304 ha), 324 acres (131 ha) of which are developed. It is 4 mi (6 km) around if walked on the path, and features over 100 exhibits. The zoo's communications director is zookeeper Ron Magill. Zoo Miami is accredited by the Association of Zoos and Aquariums (AZA).

== History ==
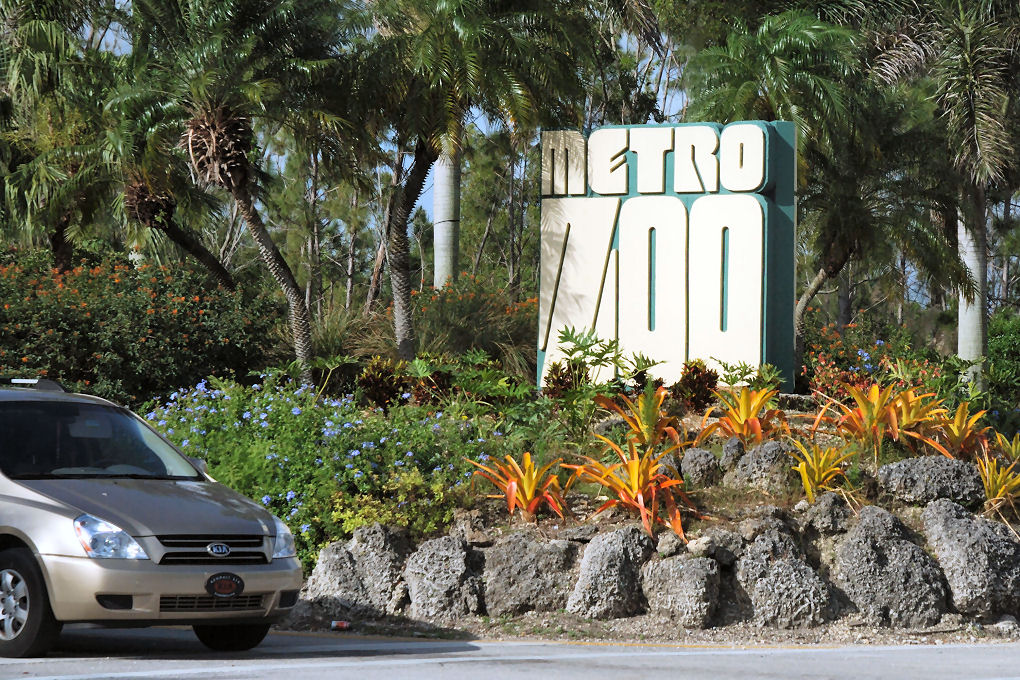
Entrance sign with the old zoo name

The history of Zoo Miami can be traced back to 1948, when a small road show, stranded near Miami, exchanged three monkeys, a goat and two black bears for approximately $270 in repairs for the truck. These six animals were the beginning of the Crandon Park Zoo at Crandon Park on the island of Key Biscayne, just southeast off the coast from downtown Miami. The Crandon Park Zoo occupied 48 acres (19.4 ha) of the park. The first animals in the zoo, including some lions, an elephant and a rhinoceros, had been stranded when a circus went out of business in Miami. Some Galapagos tortoises, monkeys and pheasants were added from the Matheson plantation. By 1967, the Crandon Park Zoo had grown to over 1,200 animals, and was considered one of the top 25 zoos in the country. Other animals were added, including a white Bengal tiger in 1968.

In 1965, Hurricane Betsy devastated the zoo and killed 250 animals. After the hurricane, there was talk of a new zoo for Dade County, but not until December 11, 1970, did Dade County officials apply for 600 acres (243 ha) of land in the Naval Air Station Richmond property. Construction began in 1975. The zoo opened on July 4, 1980, as Miami MetroZoo, with a preview section of 12 exhibits; Asia, the first major exhibit, opened on December 12, 1981. A total of 38 exhibits, covering 200 acres (81 ha), were open to the public at this time.

In the 1980s, the zoo continued to expand. An additional 25 acres (10 ha), with six new African hoofed-mammal exhibits, opened in 1982, along with the zoo's monorail in 1984. After the closing of the 1984 Louisiana World Exposition in New Orleans, the expo's visitor monorails were moved to Florida to be re-purposed at Miami MetroZoo and operated until 2022. Wings of Asia, a 1.6-acre (0.6 ha) free-flight aviary, was opened in December 1984. Three additional African hoofed stock exhibits followed in 1985, and two new exhibits were opened in the African savanna section in 1986. The Australian section of the zoo was opened in 1989, and PAWS, the children's petting zoo, opened in 1989. The Asian Riverlife Experience opened in August 1990.

In 1992, the zoo suffered extensive damage when Hurricane Andrew made landfall in South Florida, on August 24. The small, yet intensely powerful category 5 hurricane toppled over 5,000 trees and destroyed the Wings of Asia aviary (which had been built to withstand winds of up to 120 miles per hour (193 km/h)) resulting in the loss of approximately 100 of the 300 resident birds. Despite the majority of the zoo's animals remaining outside during the duration and aftermath of Hurricane Andrew, only five animals were killed from either debris or the consumption of contaminated water. MetroZoo, though looking dramatically different, reopened on December 18, 1992, with the zoo's tiger temple exhibit renamed in honor of Naomi Browning, a local 12-year-old zoo volunteer who was one of the storm's casualties.

By July 1993, many of the animals that were sent to other zoos and animal parks across the United States (during the zoo's reconstruction) had been returned to Miami, and over 7,000 new trees had been planted to begin restoring the zoo's tree canopy.

In 1994, stray dogs entered the zoo during off-hours, and killed five Thomson's gazelles and two Grant's gazelles.

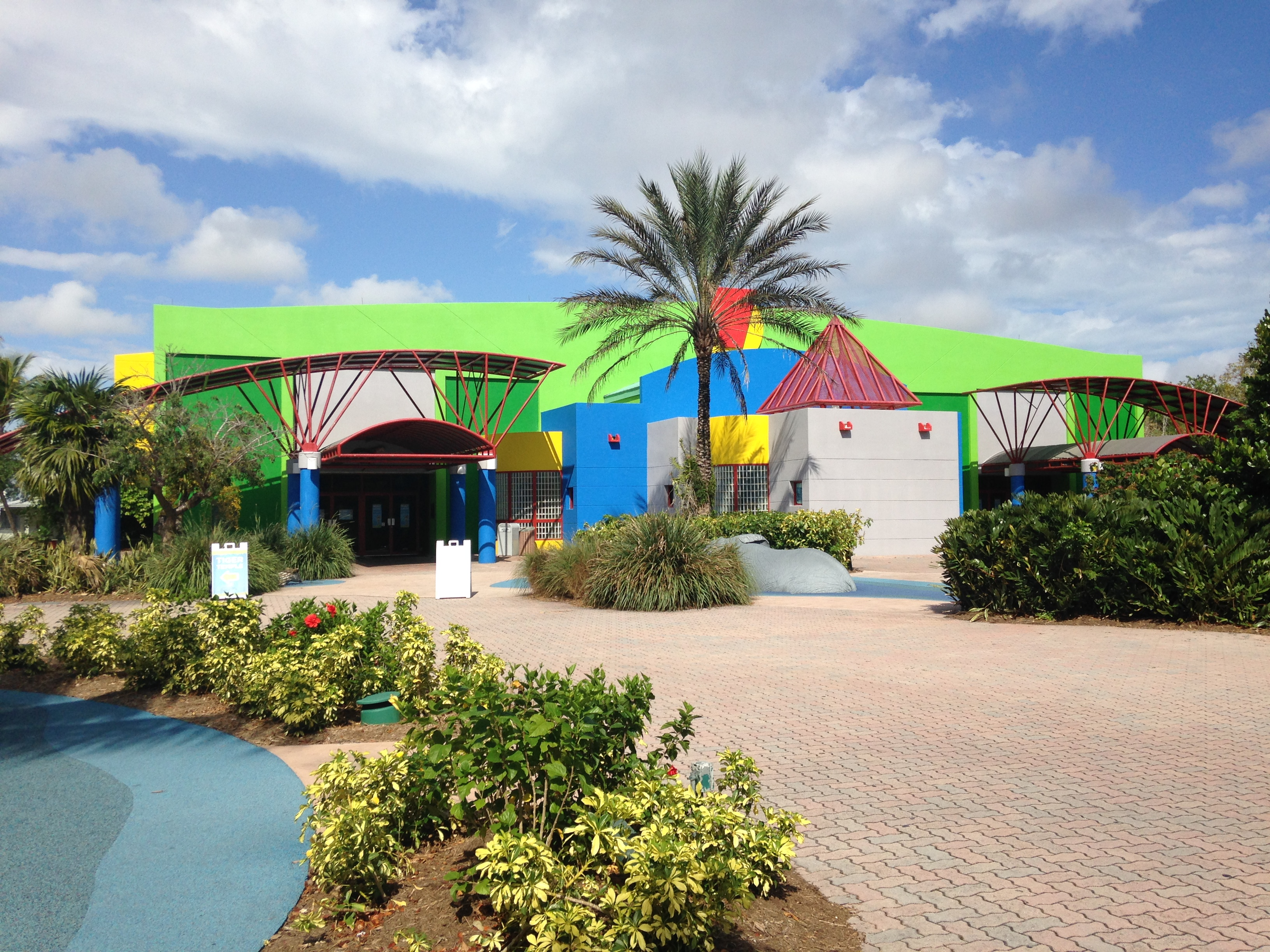
Dr. Wilde's World

In 1996, a brush fire burned 100 acres in the southeast portion of the zoo's undeveloped land. Nearly 30 animals from adjacent exhibits were evacuated. The Falcon Batchelor Komodo Dragon Encounter opened that same year, followed by exhibits featuring Andean condors (1999), meerkats (2000), Cuban crocodiles and squirrel monkeys (2001). Dr. Wilde's World, which is an indoor facility for traveling zoological exhibits, was also opened in 2001. The rebuilt Wings of Asia aviary, housing more than 300 individual birds and representing 70 species, refurbished in the spring of 2003.

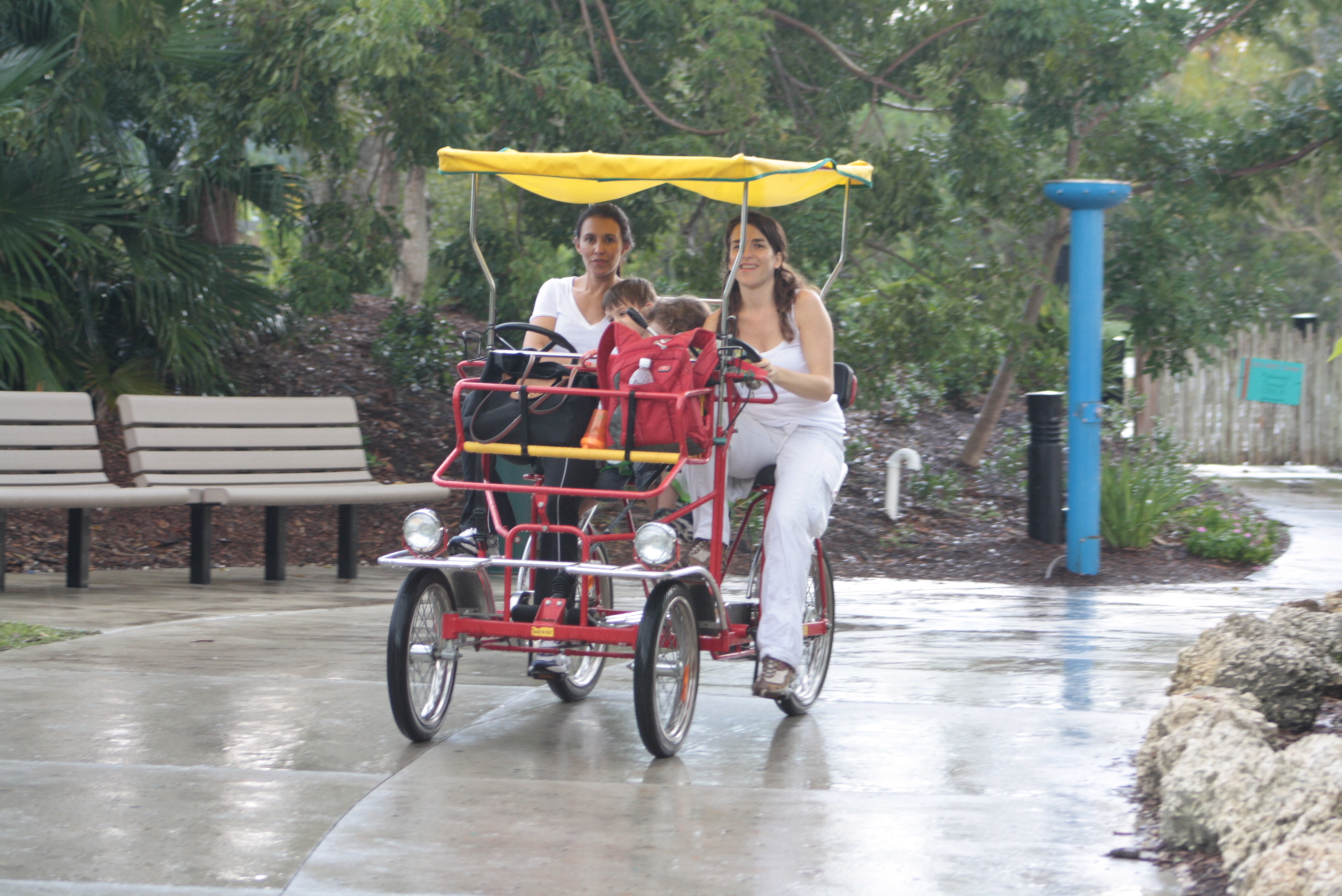
Quadricycle at Zoo Miami

On July 4, 2010, the zoo was renamed the Miami-Dade Zoological Park and Gardens, or Zoo Miami (for marketing and branding purposes). This was a part of the zoo's 30th anniversary celebration. The zoo broke ground on a $43 million project that included an Everglades exhibit and a new state-of-the-art entryway. The Everglades exhibit opened on December 10, 2016.

In 2017, the zoo was struck by Hurricane Irma, which impacted South Florida on September 10. The Amazon and Beyond exhibit suffered the most damage, with widespread tree loss in that area. According to the zoo, one American flamingo, one Great hornbill, and a few other birds died reportedly due to stress. The zoo remained closed until October.

=== Conservation efforts ===
Zoo Miami supports conservation programs at the local, national and global level, and was a founding member of the AZA's Butterfly Conservation Initiative (BFCI), a program designed to assemble governmental and non-governmental agencies to aid in the population recovery of vulnerable, threatened and endangered butterflies in North America.

The zoo has also provided financial help through the Zoo Miami Conservation Fund to upgrade captive-breeding facilities in Thailand’s zoos, notably for endangered clouded leopards and fishing cats.

== Exhibits and animals ==
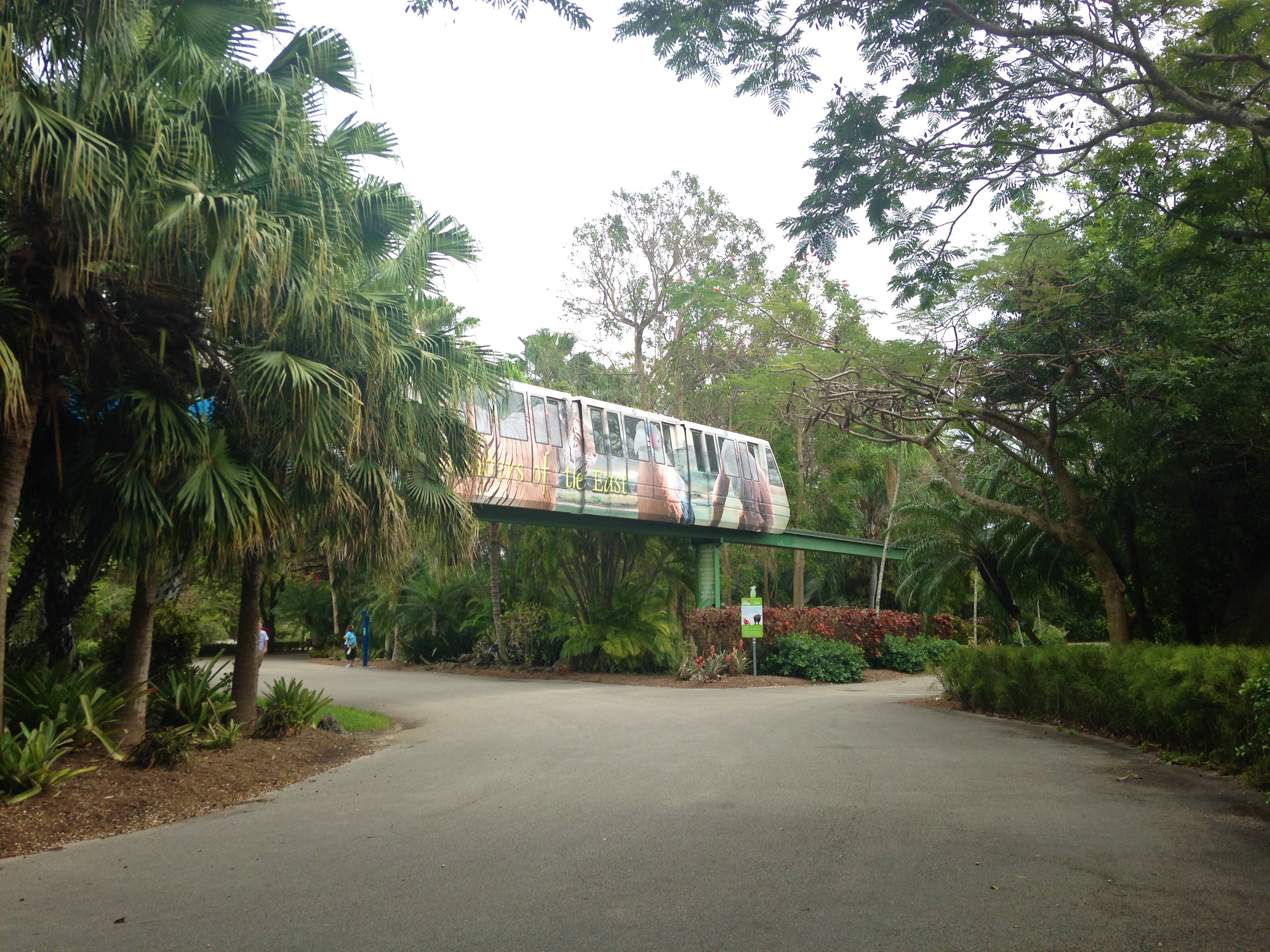
Zoo's former monorail system

There are five main exhibit sections in the zoo: Florida: Mission Everglades, Asia, Africa, Amazon and Beyond, and Australia. The zoo's main entry includes an entryway canopy structure, conjoining ticket booths and gift shop, and an adjacent American flamingo exhibit. At the junction of the zoo's main pathways, is the Conservation Action Center, an indoor pavilion featuring interactive exhibits themed to conservation and wildlife preservation. The property includes a large lake, called Lake Iguana. Zoo Miami is characterized by large cage-less, moated exhibits.

From 1984 until 2022, an air-conditioned monorail system traveled around the zoo's premises, providing both an aerial view of the zoo and a convenient way to move between sections. The monorail system had four stations throughout the zoo. Narrated tram rides and guided tours were given daily. The monorail was decommissioned due to unaffordable maintenance costs. There were 5 trains in total, 3 of which were formerly used for the New Orleans World's Fair. One train was decommissioned in 1987 so that it could be used for parts for the others, as the manufacturer ceased business.

=== Florida: Mission Everglades ===
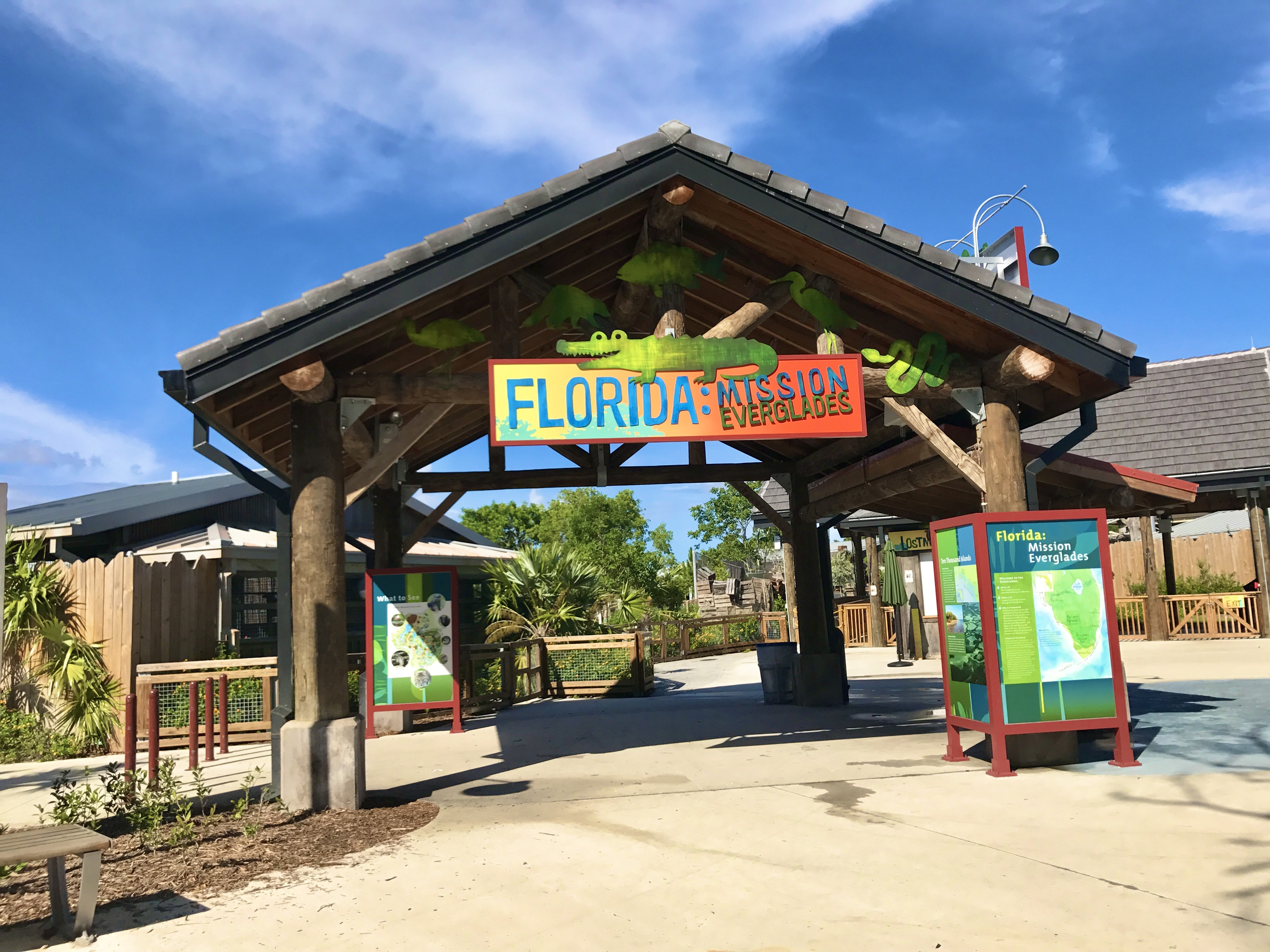
Florida: Mission Everglades exhibit

The Florida: Mission Everglades exhibit features native fauna and flora species found in Florida, particularly from the state's Everglades region. Species displayed include American alligators, American crocodiles, North American river otters, bobcats, American black bears, Florida panthers, raccoons, gray foxes, bald eagles, American white pelicans, and roseate spoonbills. The $33 million project features Lostman's River Ride, a gentle airboat ride attraction.

=== Asia ===
The zoo's Asian exhibit features dozens of animals such as Bornean orangutans, Asian elephants, Indian rhinoceros, Sumatran tigers, bantengs, gaurs, lowland anoas, Arabian oryx, Bactrian camels, Malayan tapirs, sloth bears, northern white-cheeked gibbons, Komodo dragons, as well as a variety of Asian birds. The now-defunct Asian River Life Experience replicated the appearance of an Asian river brook. Until 2023, Zoo Miami was only one of two zoos in the United States to display a pair of black-necked storks. Several species not native to Asia are also found in this area like African lions, African painted dogs, spotted hyenas, okapis, addax, sable antelopes, addra gazelles, black crowned cranes, and Cuban crocodiles.

The American Banker's Family Aviary, Wings of Asia is a walkthrough aviary that's home to approximately 85 species of birds.

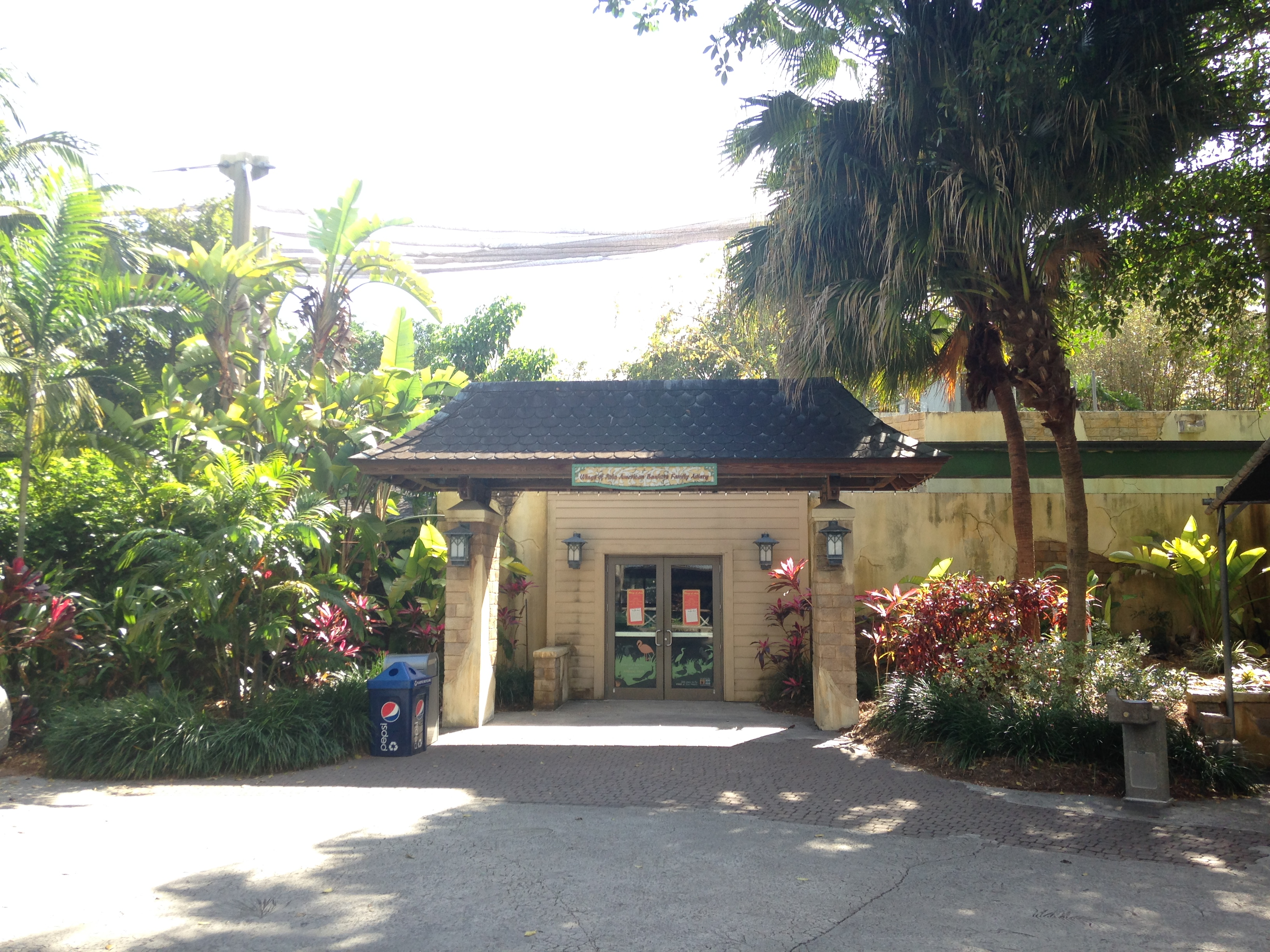
Wings of Asia Aviary

Bird Species List:

- Javan pond heron
- Painted stork
- White stork
- Magpie goose
- Mandarin duck
- Bar-headed goose
- Red-breasted goose
- Spotted whistling duck
- Falcated duck
- Indian spot-billed duck
- Australian shoveler
- Marbled teal
- Ruddy shelduck
- Tufted duck
- Scaly-sided merganser
- White-winged duck
- Green peafowl
- Great argus
- Germain's peacock-pheasant
- Edward's pheasant
- Green junglefowl
- Masked lapwing
- Grey-headed swamphen
- Black bulbul
- Buff-banded rail
- Pied imperial pigeon
- Nicobar pigeon
- Red-knobbed imperial pigeon
- Green-naped pheasant pigeon
- Victoria crowned pigeon
- Mindanao bleeding-heart
- Luzon bleeding-heart
- Red-vented bulbul
- White-eared bulbul
- Fawn-breasted bowerbird
- Black-throated laughingthrush
- Black-naped oriole
- Metallic starling
- Black-collared starling
- White-eared catbird
- Azure-winged magpie
- Great hornbill

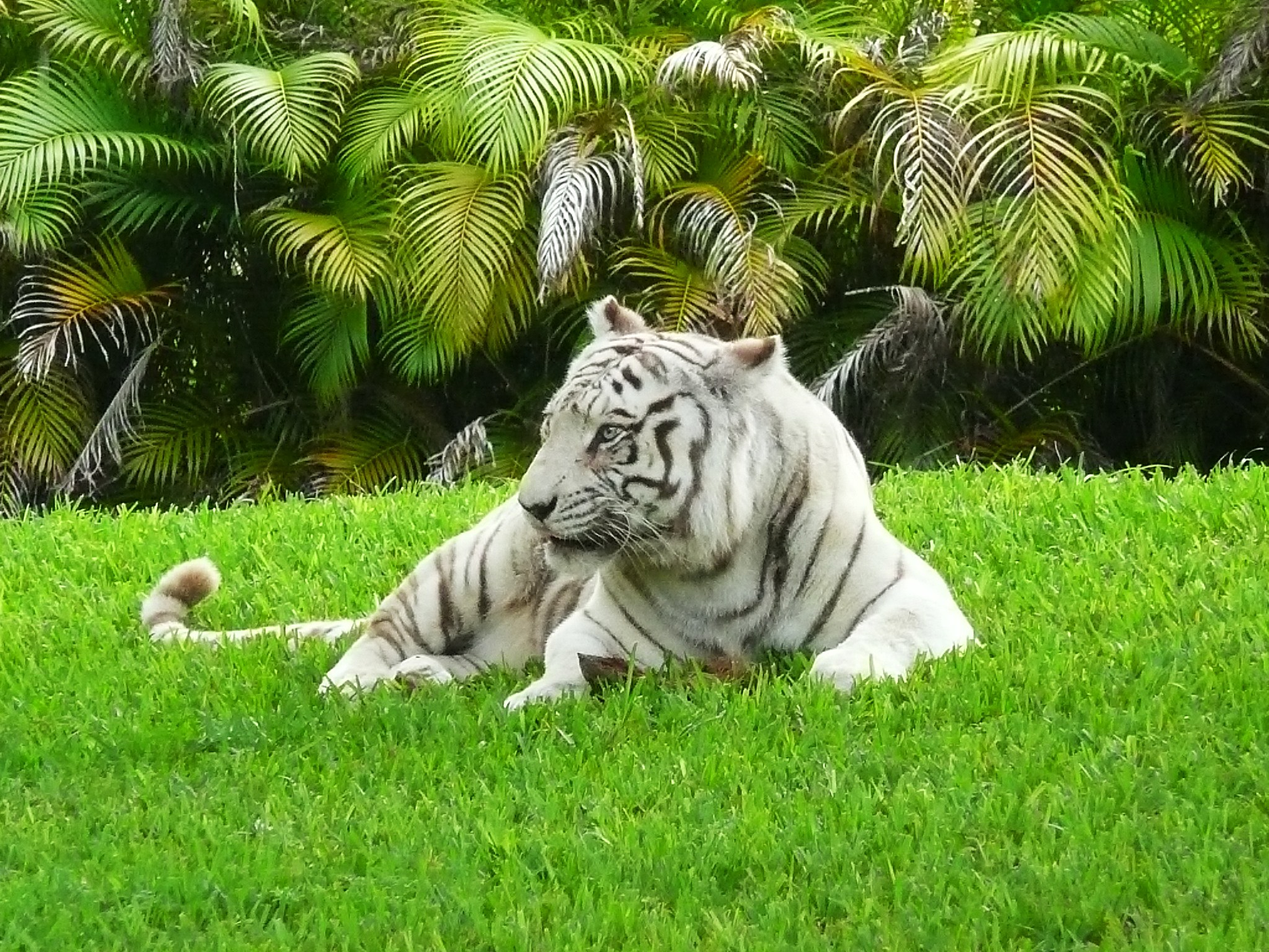
Carlita, a white tiger, was an icon of the zoo for nearly two decades.

The zoo's orangutan exhibit once housed Nonja, a female Sumatran orangutan that was relocated from a Dutch zoo to Zoo Miami. She was widely believed to be the oldest living specimen of her species, until her death in 2007. Another notable resident was Carlita, a 21-year-old female white Bengal tiger, who resided in the zoo's tiger enclosure from 1994 until her death in 2013.

The Asian exhibit is home to two Asian elephants: an elderly female named Nellie and a young male named Ongard. Dalip (a bull born on June 8, 1966, in Kerela), arrived at the old Crandon Park Zoo on Key Biscayne as a young calf in August 1967, along with his mate Seetna and he is the father to Spike (born on July 2, 1981, in Zoo Miami and he is Dalip's only surviving offspring) who currently lives in the Smithsonian National Zoo in Washington. Seetena and Dalip were separated due to the damage caused by Hurricane Andrew in 1992. Both were separated during the storm, Seetna moved to Two Tails Ranch (Patricia Zerbini) and stayed there for breeding purposes but died of labor issues in 1996 while Dalip returned to Zoo Miami in 1995 where he remained until his death in 2022.

The American Banker's Family Aviary, Wings of Asia, is also located here. The aviary features 300 rare birds of 70 species in a temperate mixed forest, and it highlights the evolutionary connection of birds to dinosaurs. At 54,000 square feet (5,017 m^{2}), it is the largest open-air Asian aviary in the Western Hemisphere. The Children's Zoo hosts animals that can be approached to a close distance by guests. Guests can view meerkats, a petting zoo, an exhibit that displays small species of reptiles, amphibians and insects, butterfly gardens, a carousel dedicated to individual animal species, and a dromedary camel paddock.

=== Africa ===
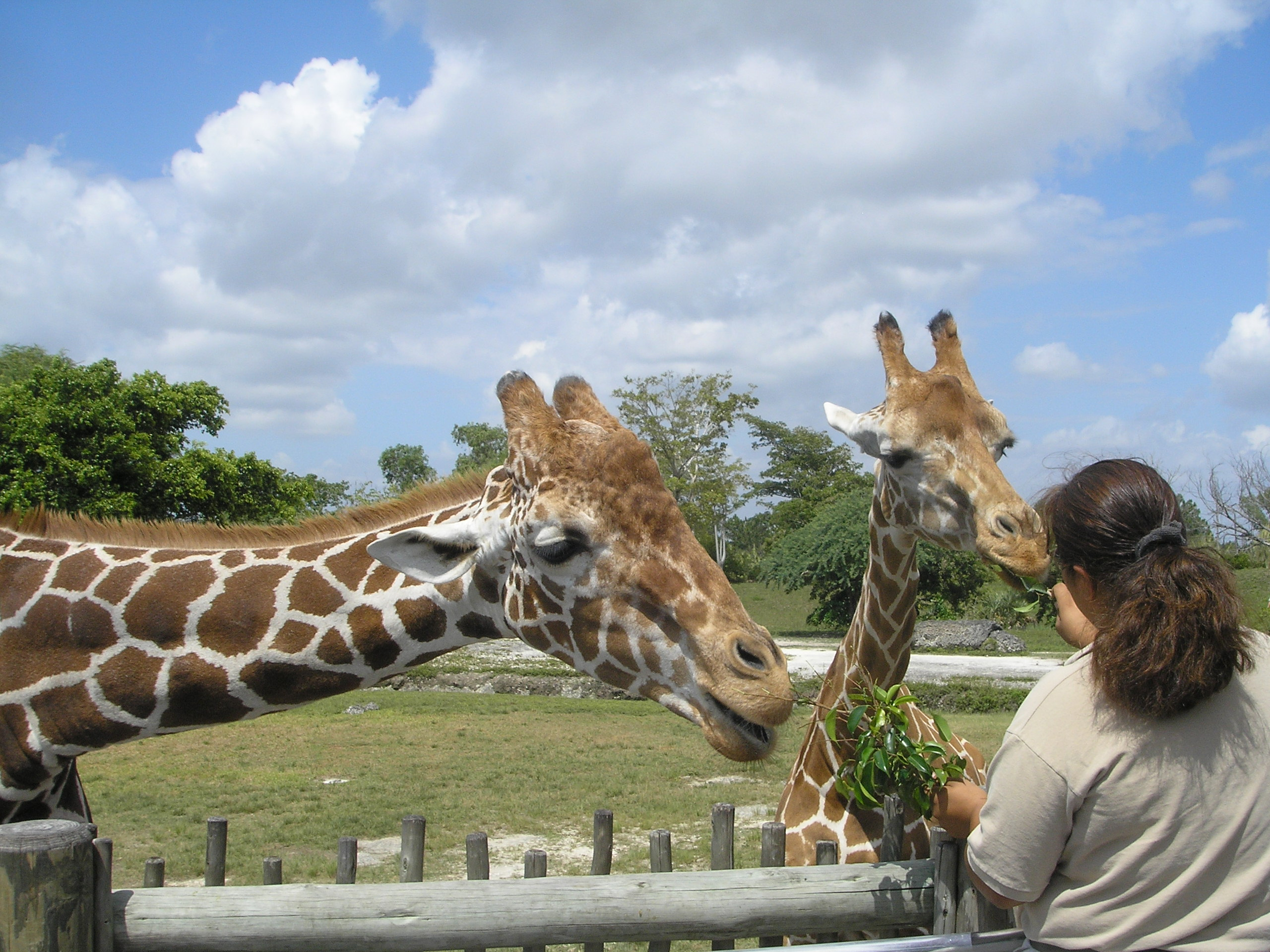
Samburu Giraffe Feeding Station

The African loop of the zoo offers animals from different locations on Africa. Visitors can observe species including reticulated giraffes, pygmy hippos, African bush elephants, eastern black rhinoceroses, greater kudus, nyalas, slender-horned gazelles, Grevy's zebras, giant elands, chimpanzees, mountain bongo, yellow-backed duikers, and okapis. Oasis Grill, a small eatery plaza, is situated at the northern end of the African exhibits. Zoo Miami has one of the most diverse collections of hoofed stock in the United States.

Eleven-year-old "Pongo", at sixteen feet the tallest giraffe in the zoo, was euthanized on January 4, 2021, after failing to recover from a foot injury.

On June 4, 2025, the zoo received a female Andean bear from the National Zoo. On September 8, she made a public debut in the former gorilla exhibit.

=== Amazon and Beyond ===
Amazon and Beyond, situated in the zoo's northwest corner, opened on December 6, 2008, and is a collection of South America animals. This area has 27 acres (10.9 ha) dedicated to the flora and fauna of South America, and is subdivided into four distinct areas: Village Plaza, Cloud Forest, Amazon Flooded Forest, and Atlantic Forest. Three areas represent native habitats that are found in the Amazonian region—the "cloud forest", the Amazon River basin, and the Atlantic Forest-Pantanal—with species such as giant otters, jaguars, Orinoco crocodiles, giant anteaters, black howler monkeys, black-handed spider monkeys, Hoffmann's two-toed sloths, harpy eagles, bats, poison dart frogs, and various Amazonian fish.

Nearby is a yard for guanacos and Chacoan peccaries.

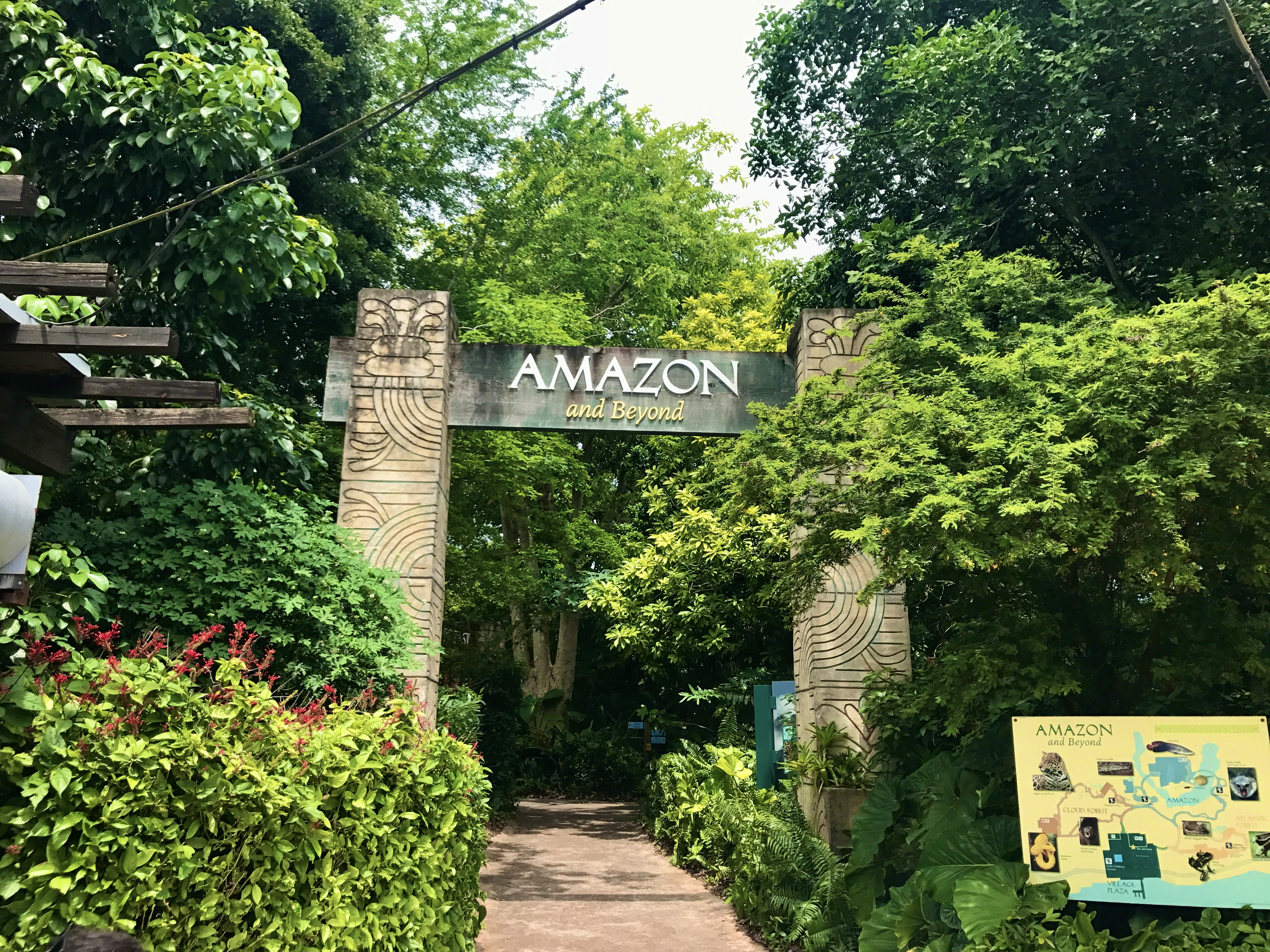
Amazon and Beyond exhibit

=== Australia ===
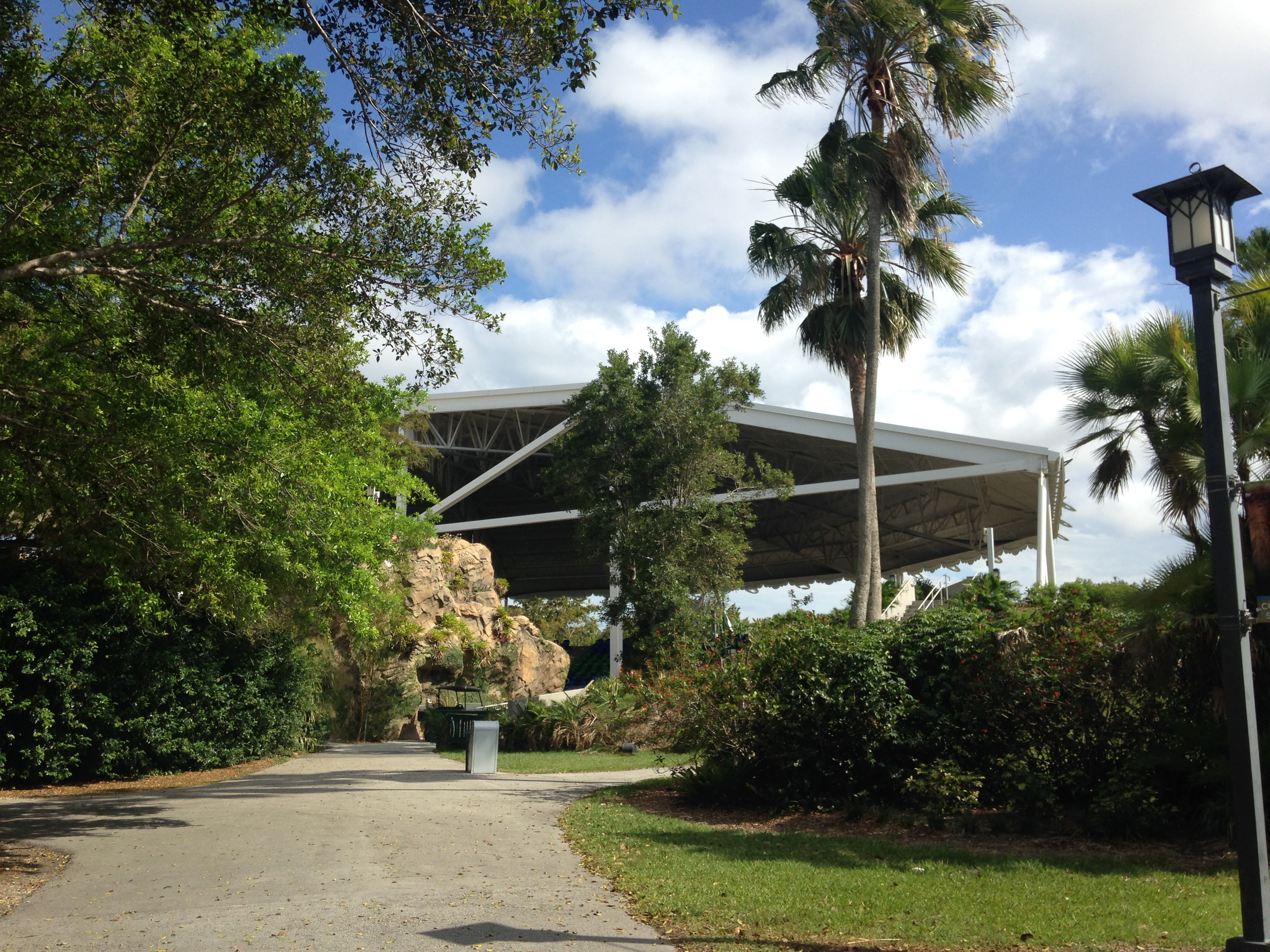
Sami Family Amphitheater

The zoo's Australian habitat showcases specimens from throughout the region of Australia, Oceania, and the Pacific islands, including koalas, southern cassowaries, southern hairy-nosed wombats, cockatiels, and Matschie's tree-kangaroos. Situated near this to habitat, is the 800-seat Sami Family Amphitheater, where daily animal presentations, concerts and cultural events are held.

The amphitheater is named in memory of Albert and Winifred Sami, who anonymously donated an estimated $3 million to the zoo from 1993 until their deaths in 2007 and 2014, respectively. In Late 2024, it now includes rotating exhibits for animal ambassadors including cheetahs, servals, giant anteaters, a king vulture, and a white-rumped vulture. Zoo Miami celebrated the birth of a baby koala, who was actually born in May 2019, but only emerged from its mothers pouch on January 8, 2020. The baby koala was named Hope in light of the recent fires that devastated Australia.

Near the Australian habitat is a trail with Galapagos giant tortoises, babirusas, red river hogs, common warthogs, and Visayan warty pigs.

== Gallery ==
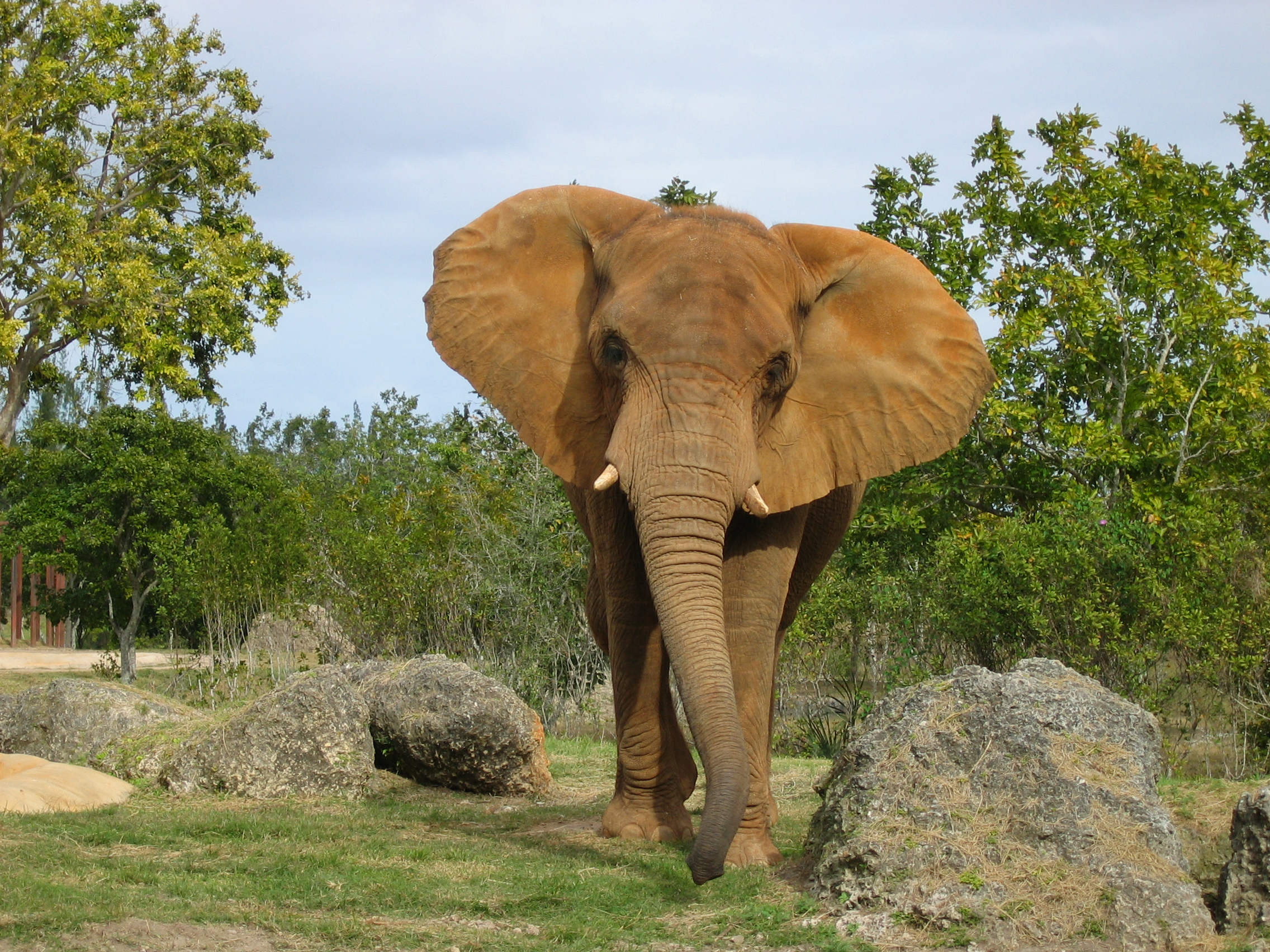
African elephant at the zoo

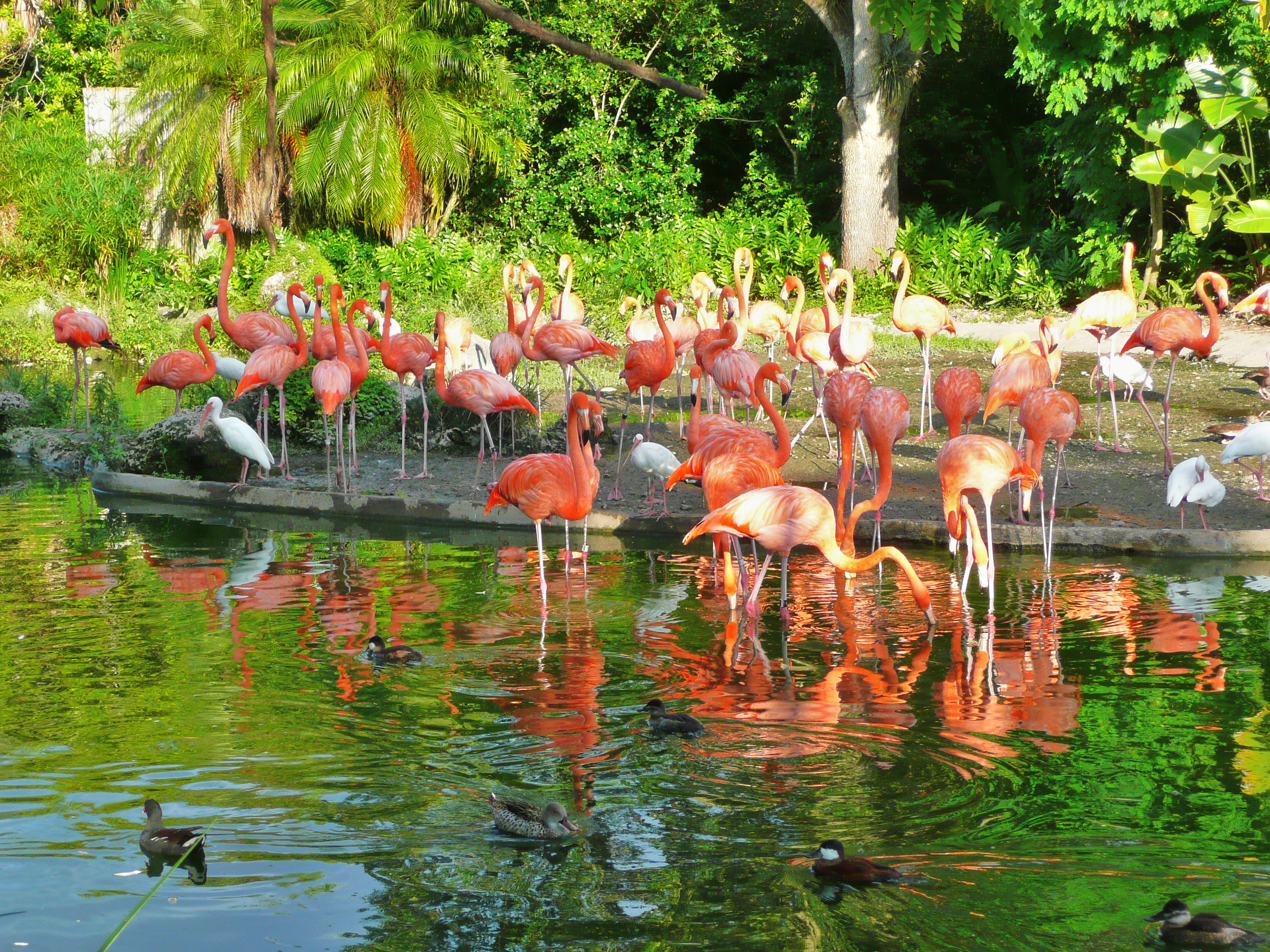
American flamingos (Phoenicopterus ruber)

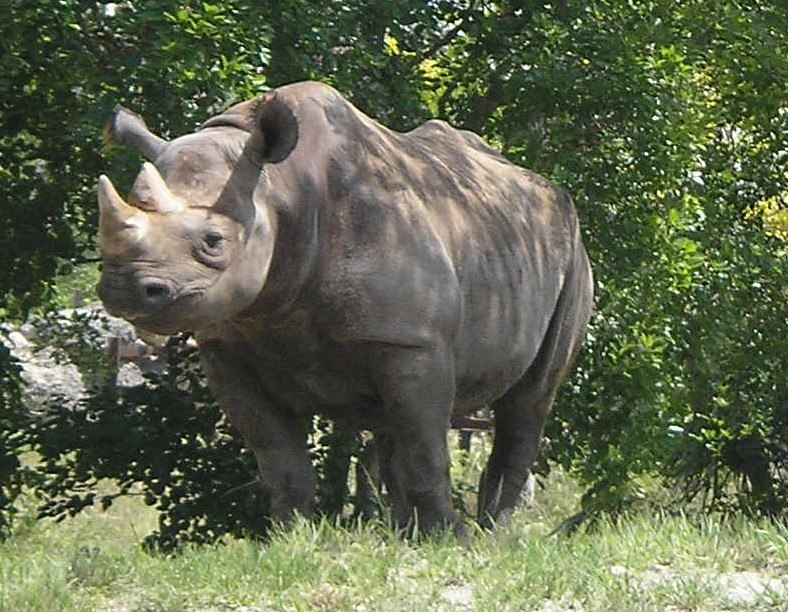
Rhinoceros

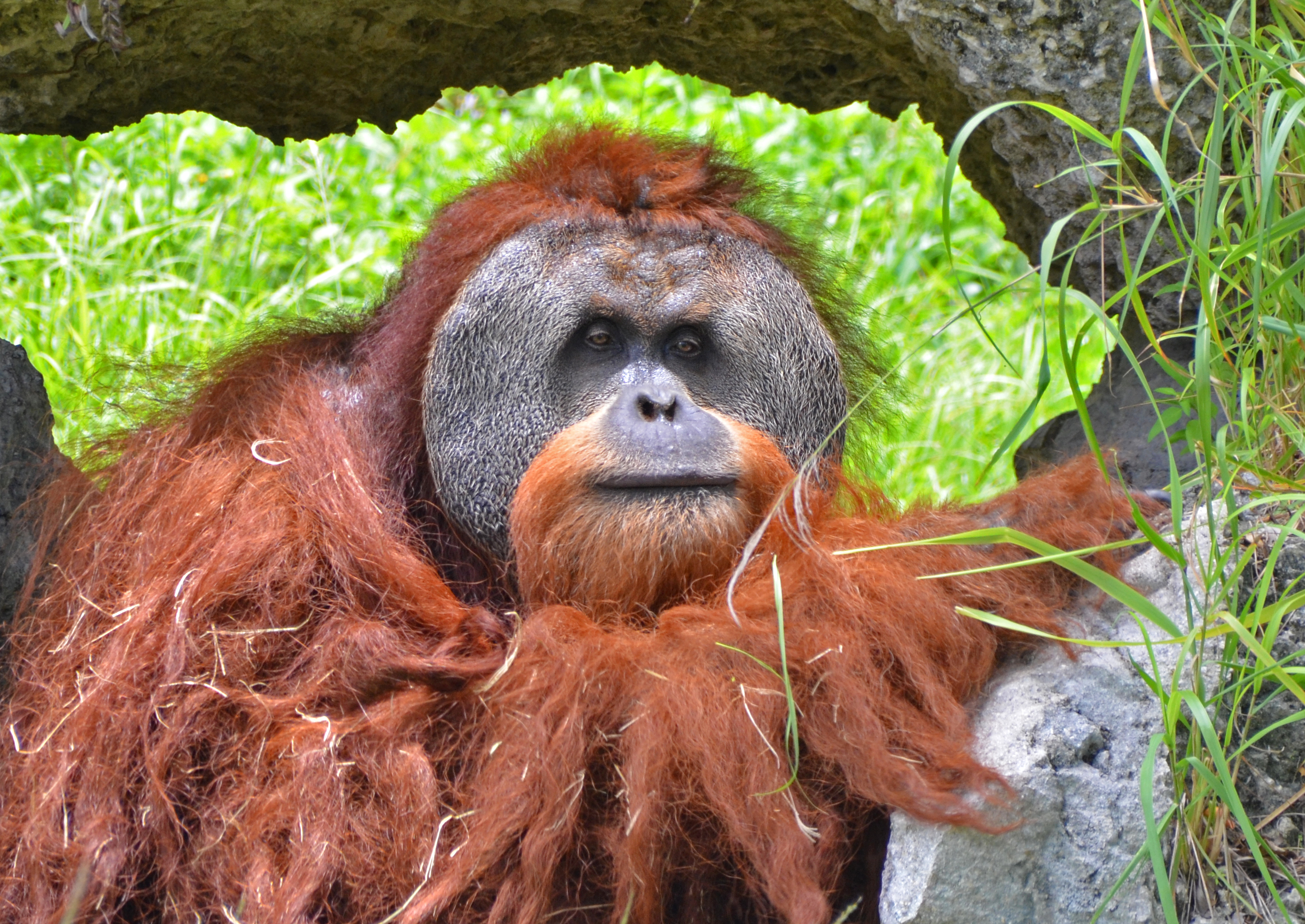
Orangutan at the zoo

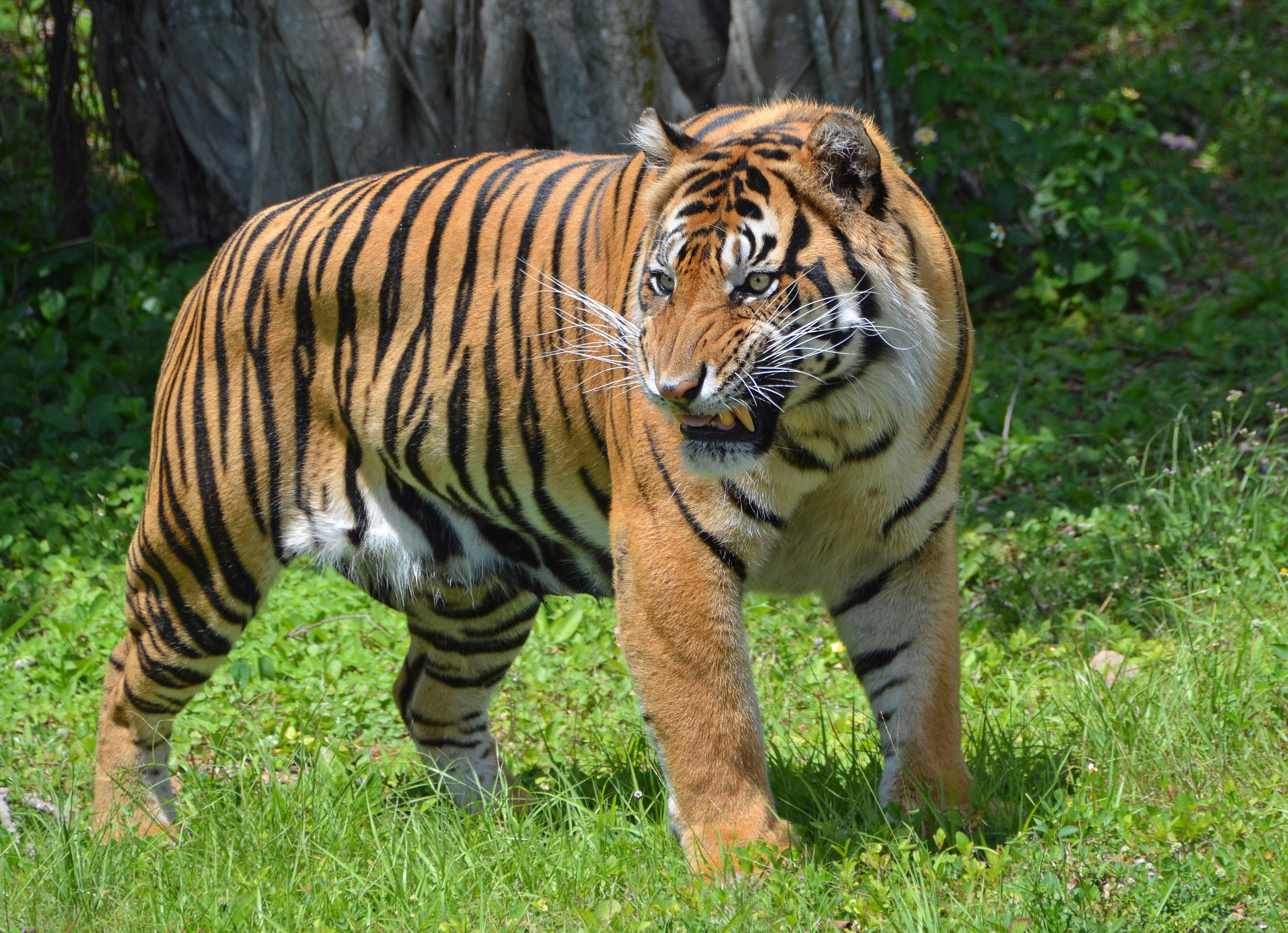
Sumatran tiger (Panthera tigris sondaica)

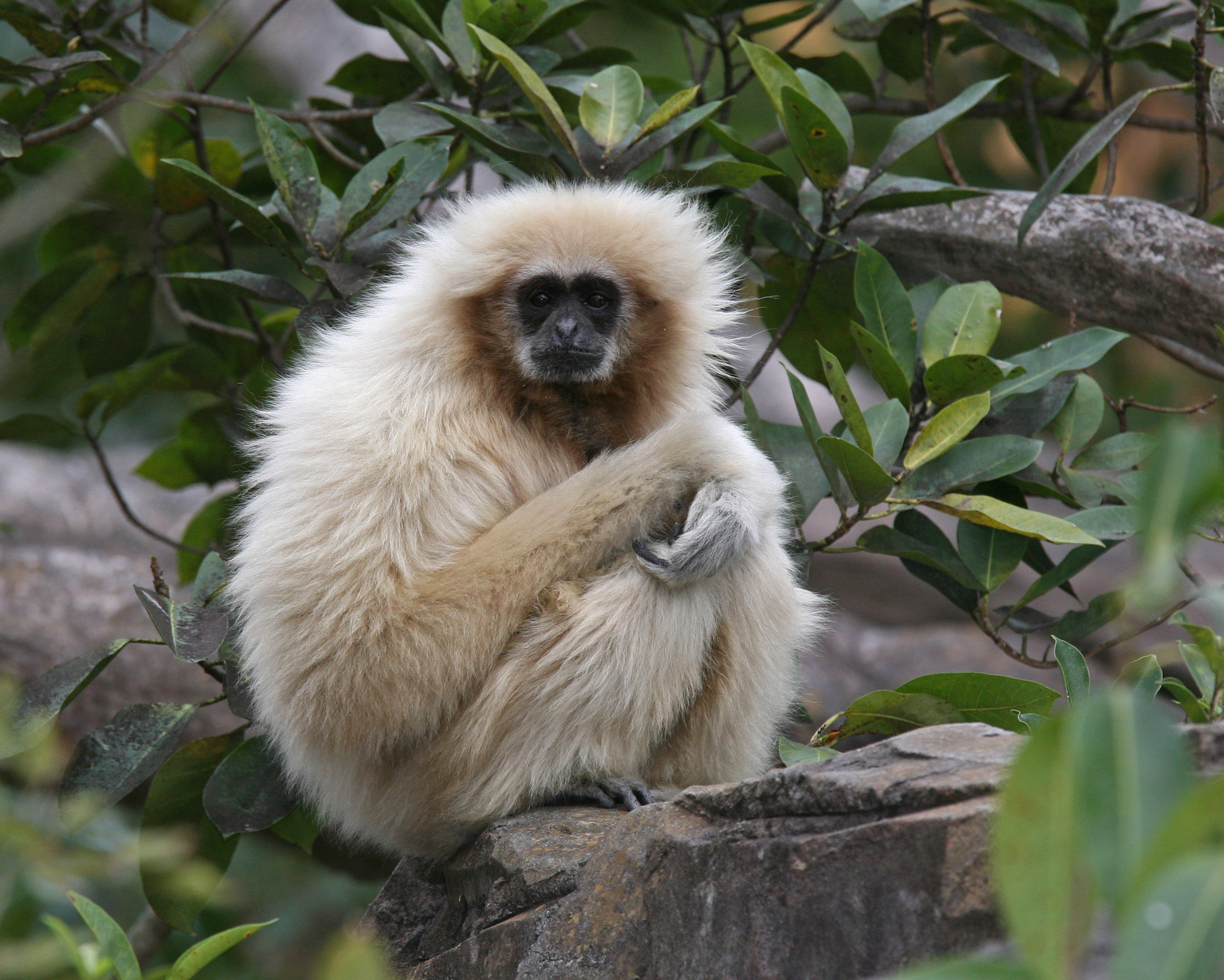
Lar gibbon (Hylobates lar)

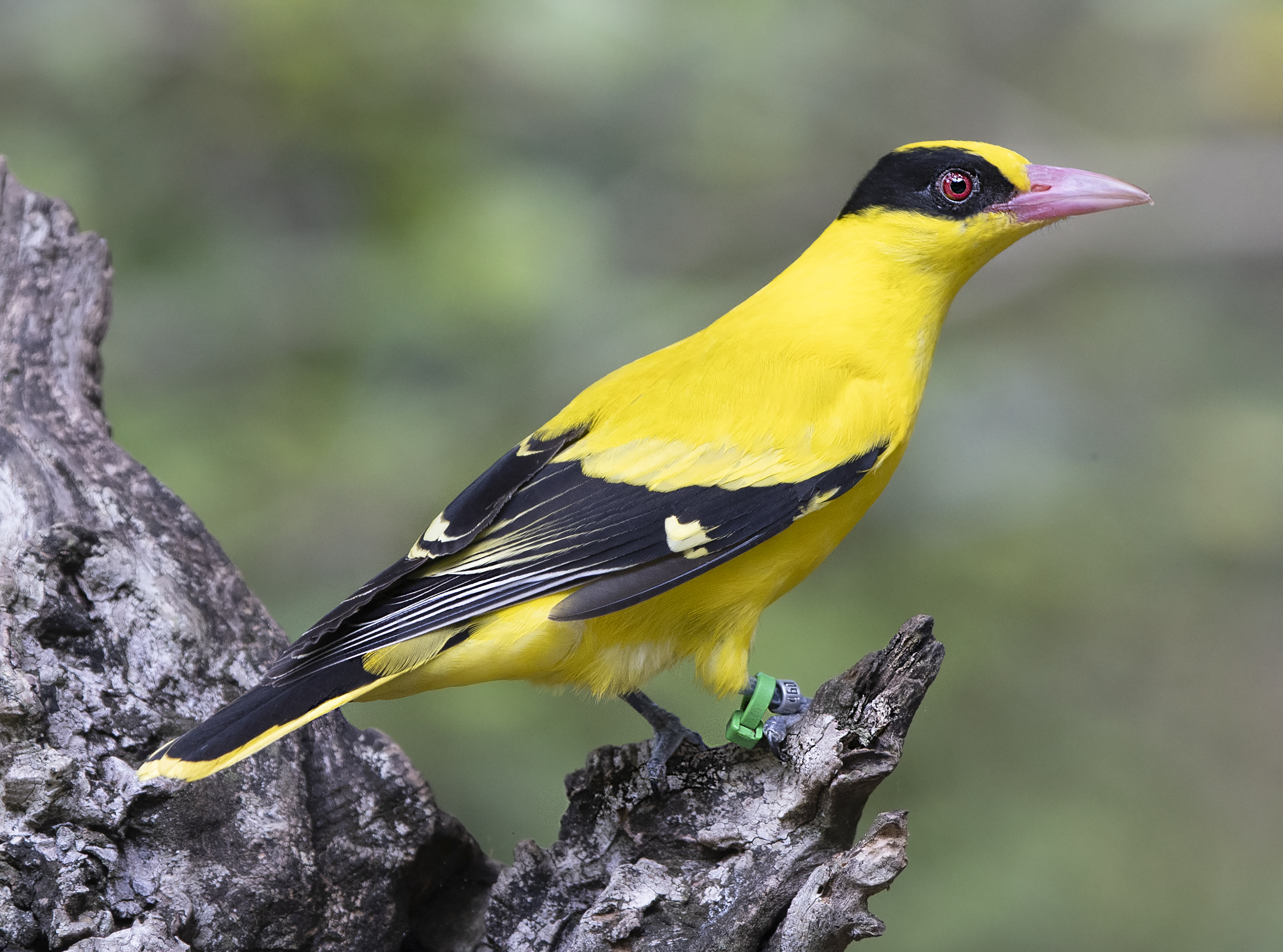
Black-naped oriole (Oriolus chinensis)

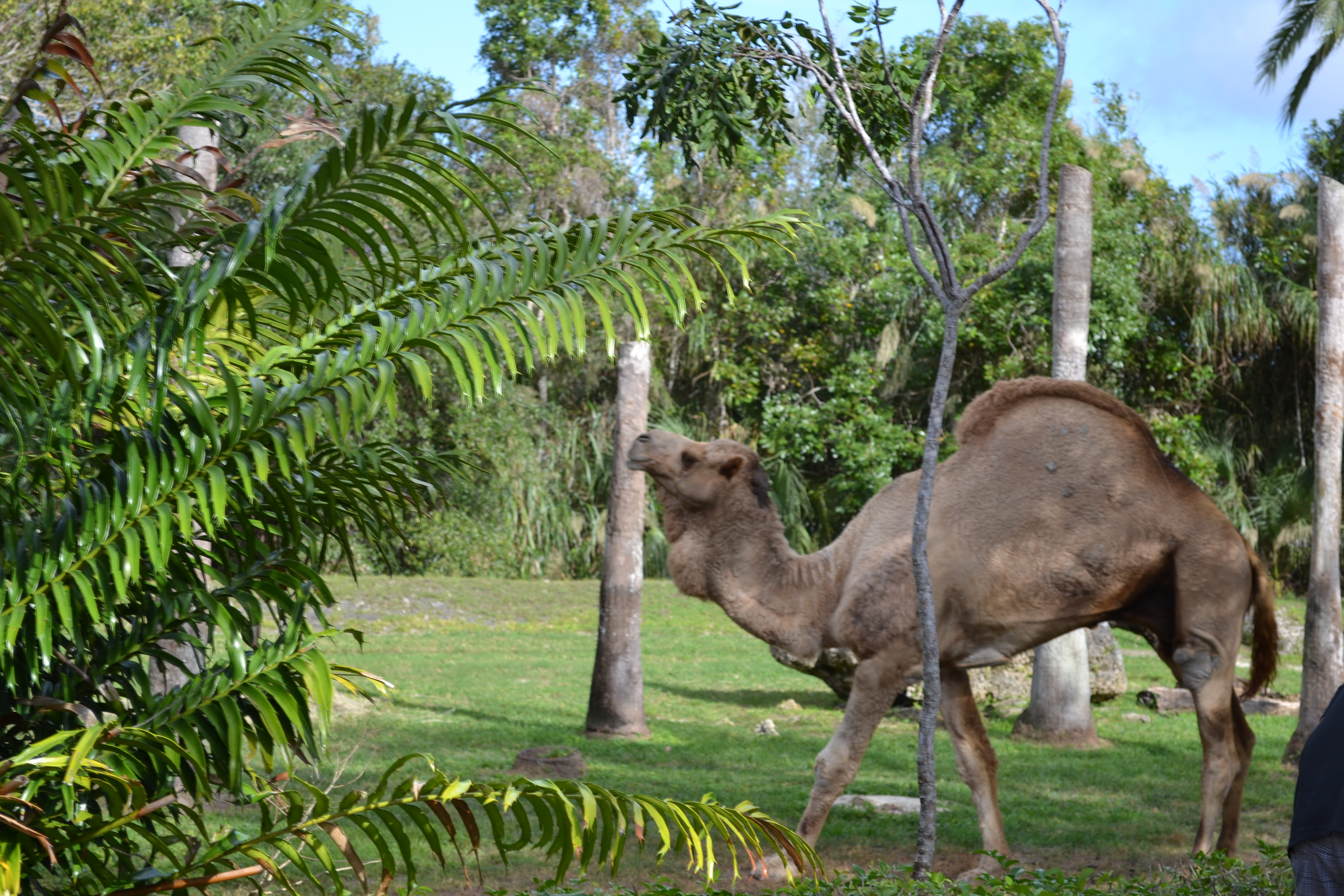
Camel

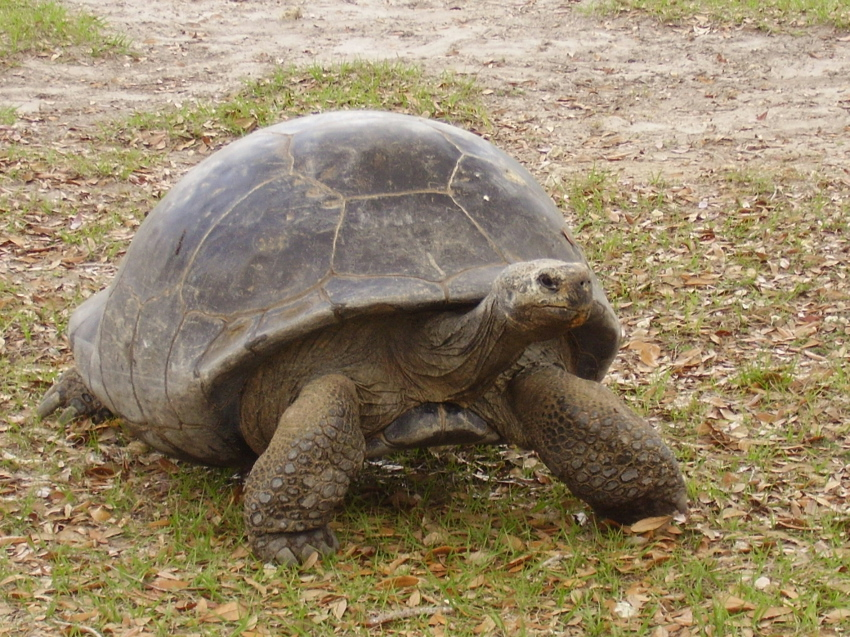
Tortoise

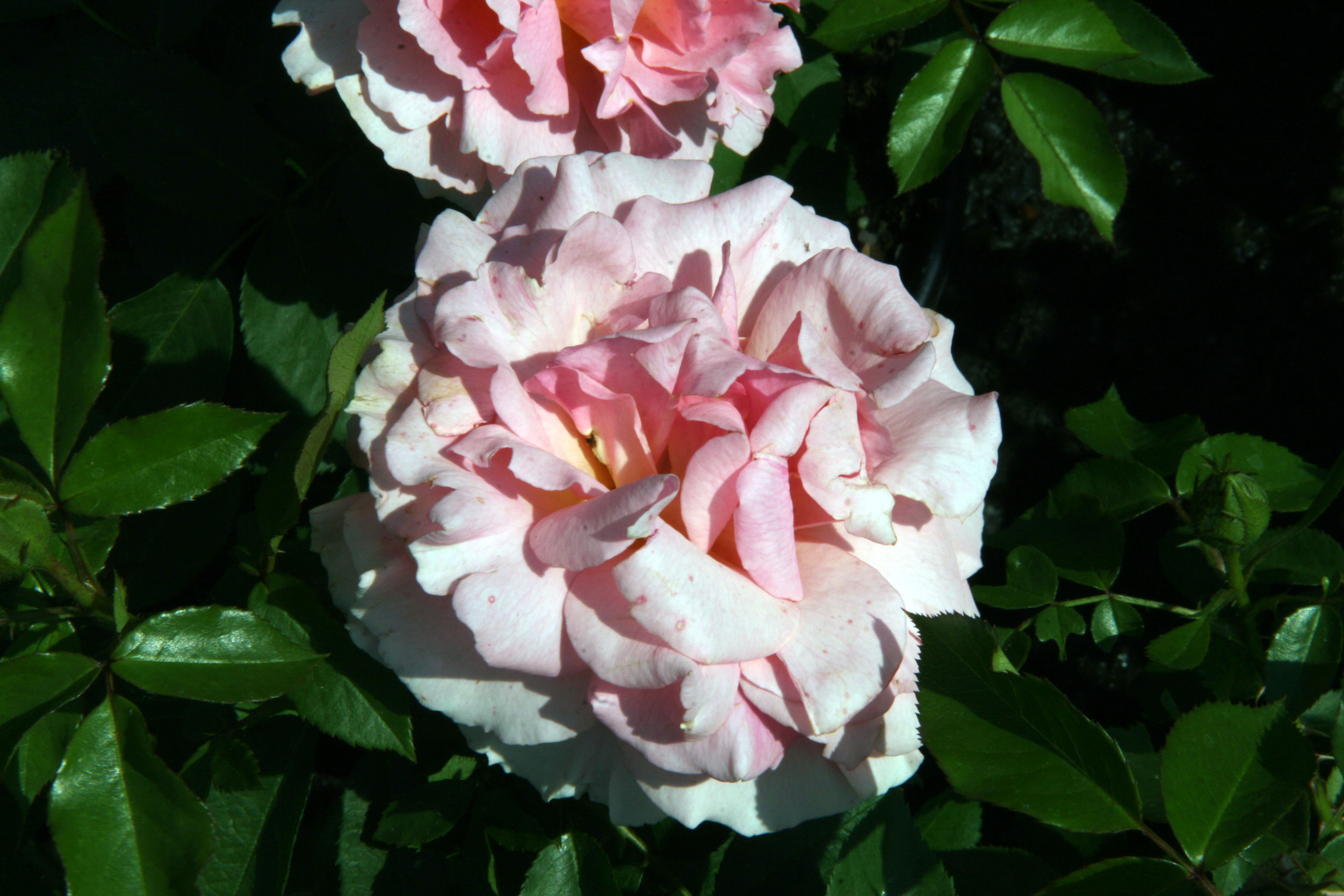
Rosa 'Miami Moon', one of the many flowering plants at the zoo

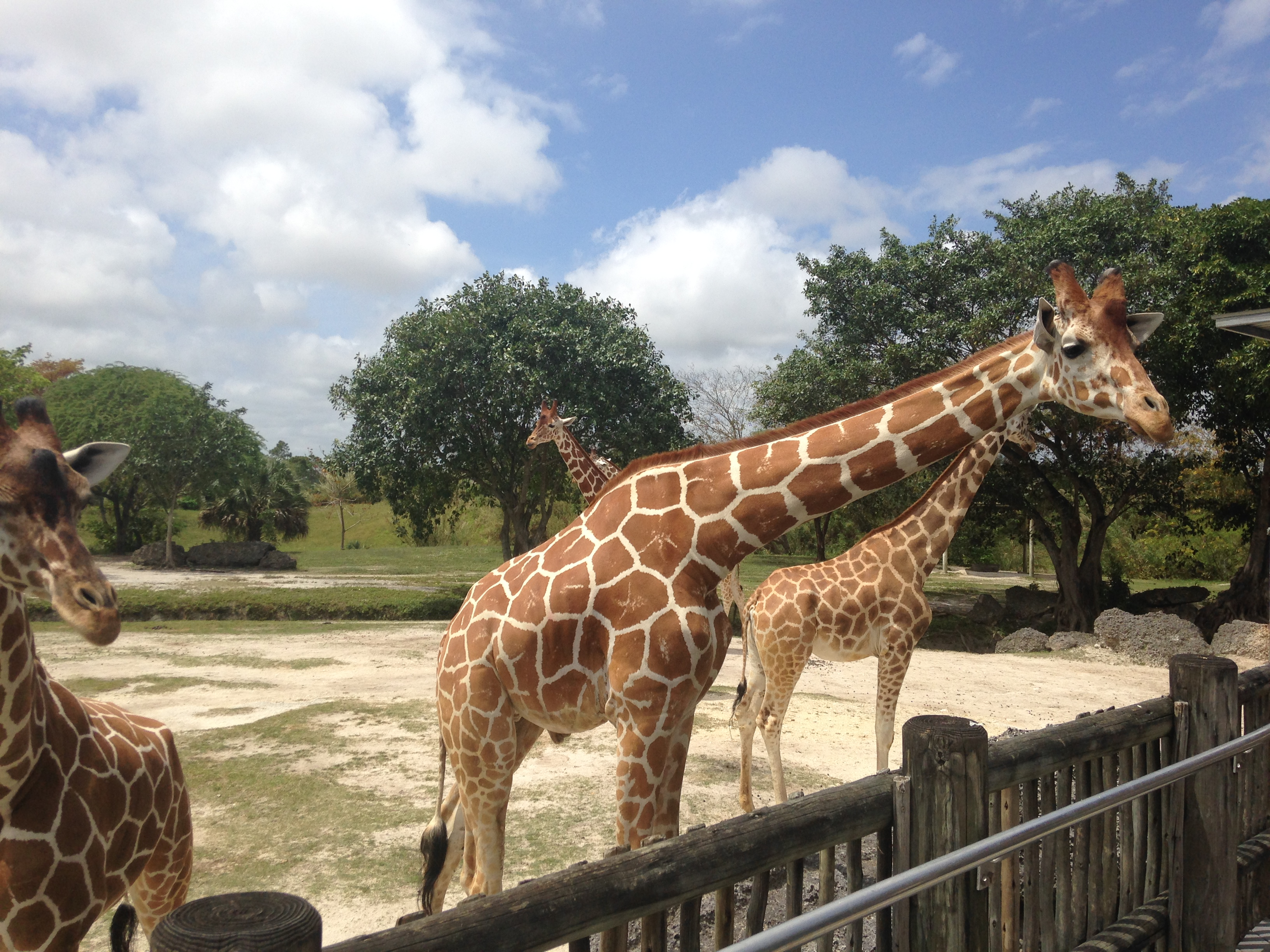
Giraffe

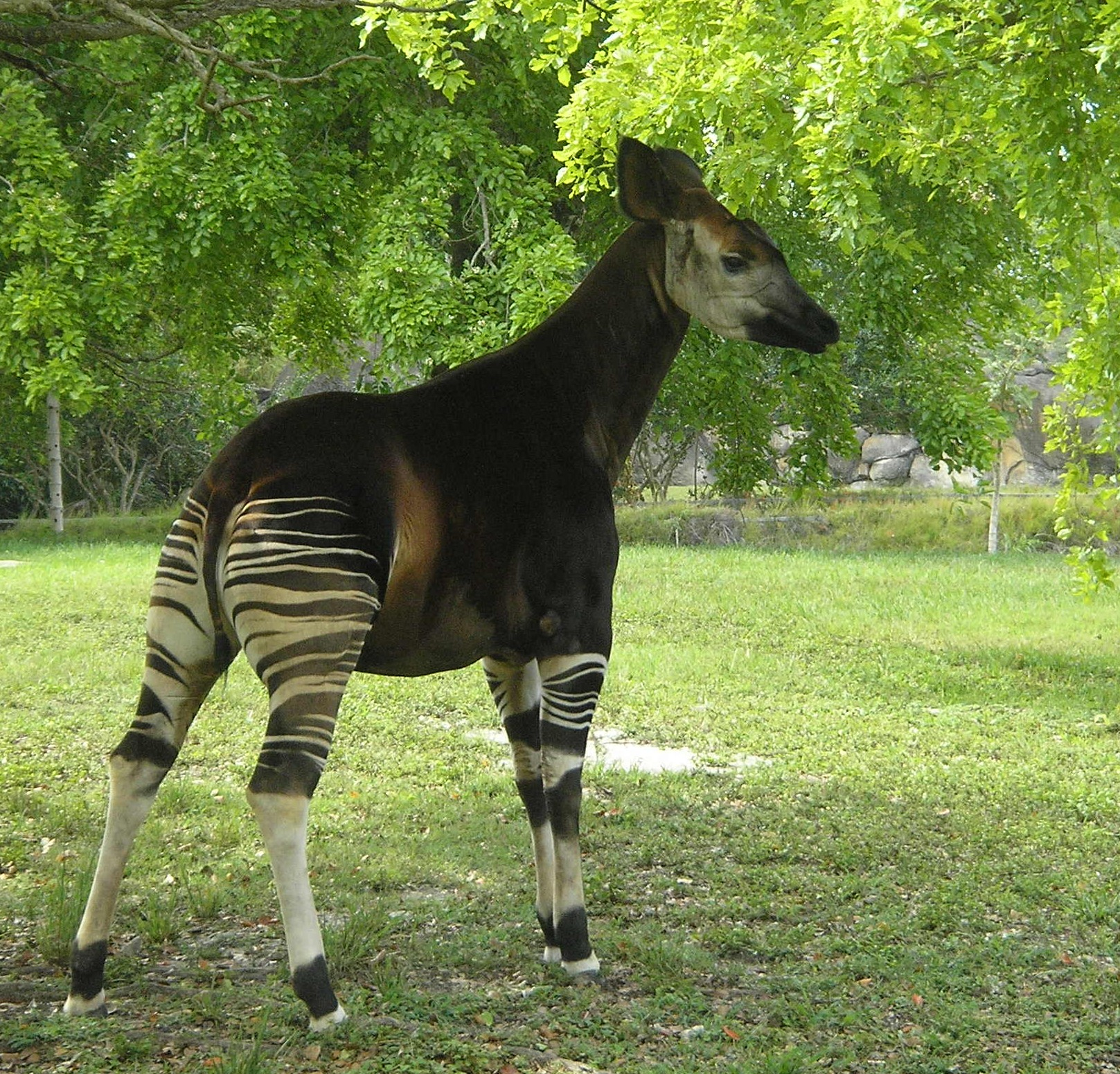
Okapi

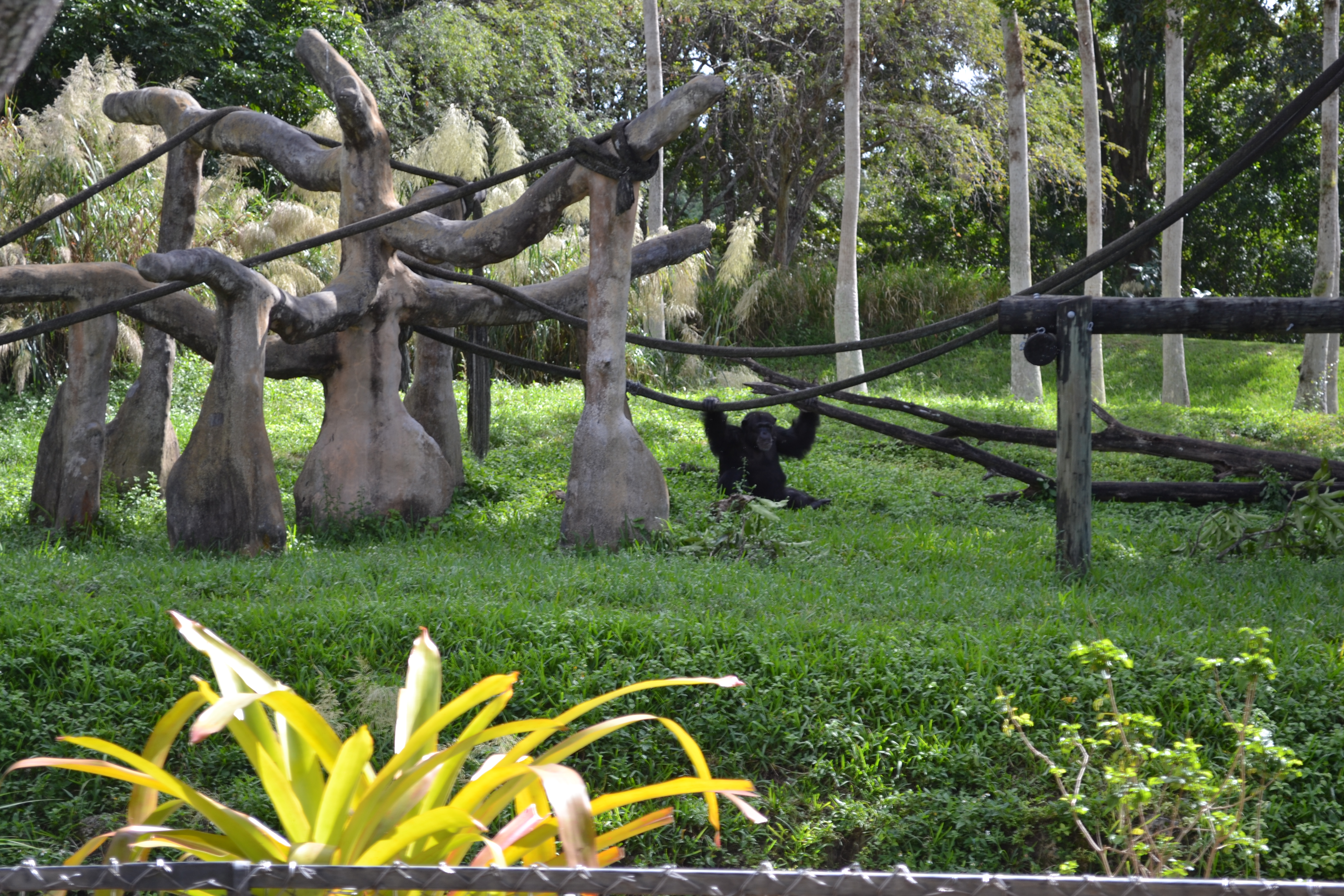
Chimpanzee

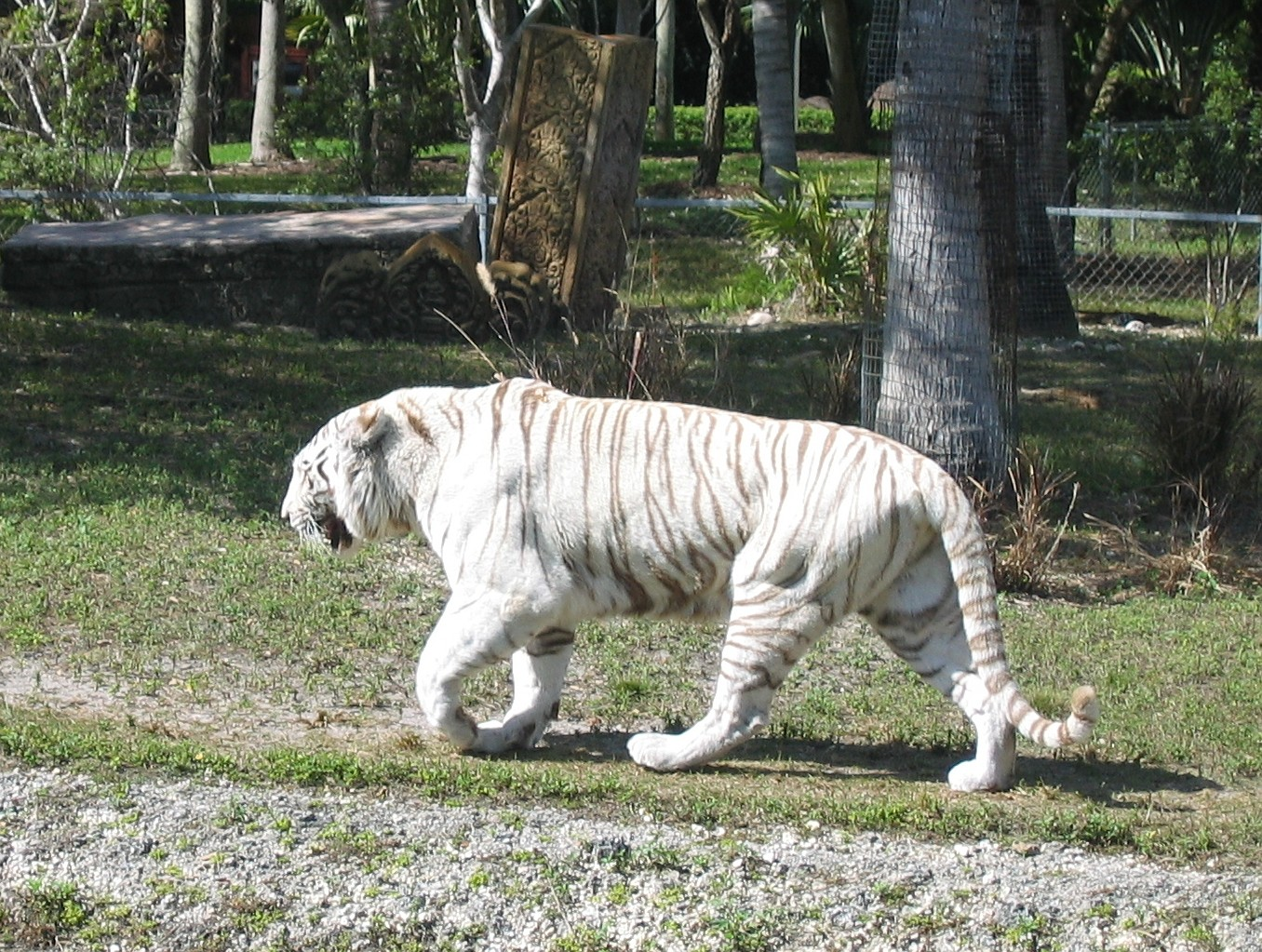
White tiger

== Paora controversy ==
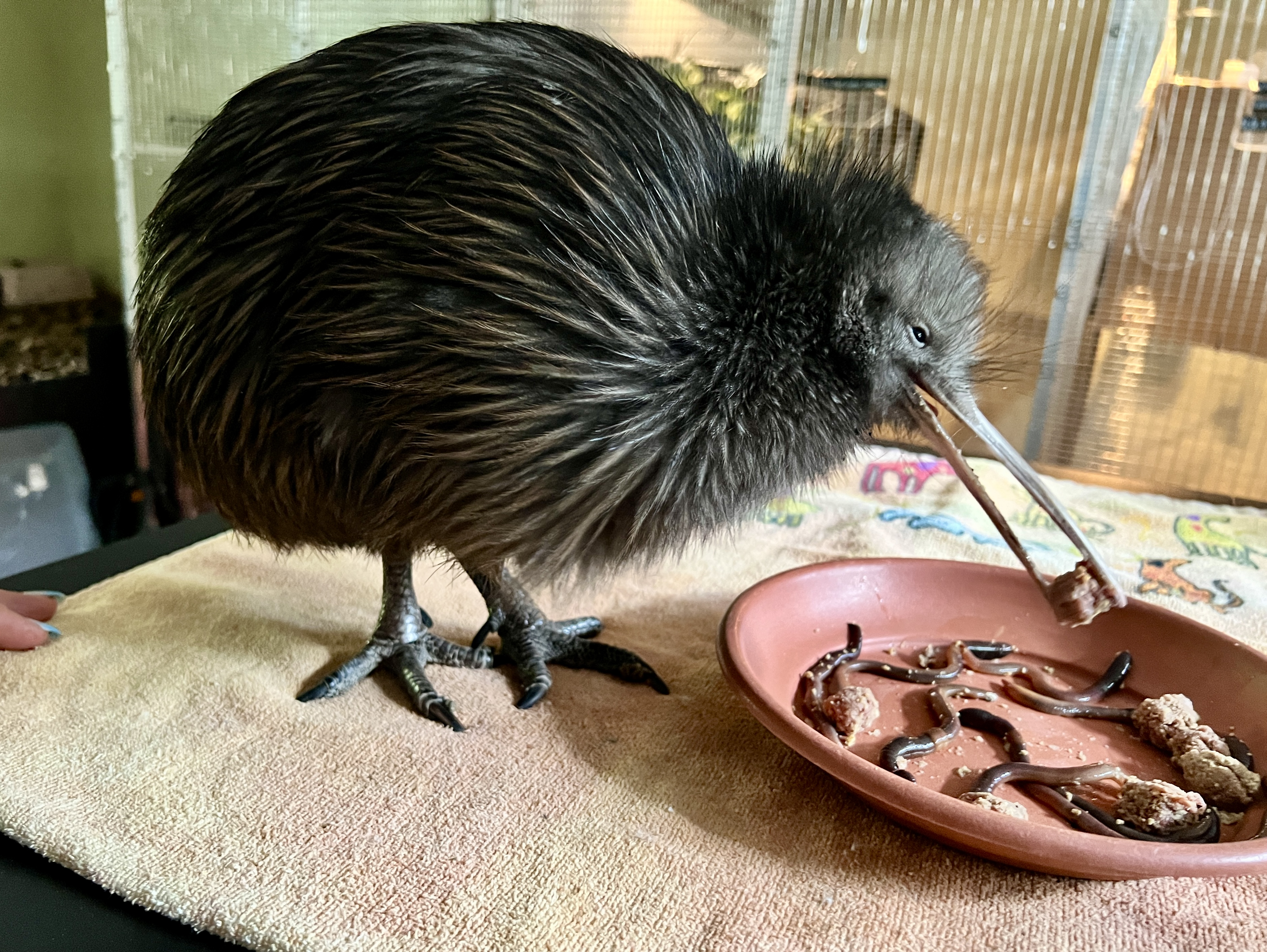
Paora the kiwi eating

In May 2023, footage of a kiwi named Paora at Zoo Miami being mistreated caused outrage amongst New Zealanders and conservation experts, including Paora Haitana for whom the bird is named. The New Zealand Department of Conservation stated they would raise their concerns with the AZA. The reasons experts brought up for their concerns included

- Kiwis are nocturnal and extremely sensitive to lights. Paora was being shown four days out of the week in bright LED lights, fluorescent lights, or sunlight.
- Paora being shown being feed human food that is unsafe for the species diet.
- The handling of Paora going against the New Zealand Department of Conservation's Kiwi Best Practice Manual, "Kiwi must not be regularly taken out of their burrows just for the purposes of allowing people to see and touch them. The birds are to be handled no more frequently than usual" and "Individuals or small groups of people (no more than 10) may attend and observe routine health checks and transmitter changes on kiwi. The birds are to be handled by only an Approved Kiwi Handler as part of their husbandry requirements"
- Both guests and zookeepers "pushing Paora's head to the tabletop [and] scratching his whiskers"
- The bird only having a small wooden box like hide to find shelter and it repeatedly being opened to show Paora off.
- Bird conservationists, like Robert Webb and Simon Hall, pointed out his behaviours that were being misunderstood by non experts as cute. Such as him closing his eyes with being pet was actually a sign of fear in kiwis.

Zoo Miami subsequently apologised on 23 May 2023, and discontinued the kiwi encounters. Zoo Miami goodwill ambassador Ron Magill apologised on live TV for Newshub, saying "At the end of the day, it is really indefensible. We are profoundly apologetic. I can tell you that we have listened to you, we have listened to the people who've called. Effective immediately this morning that entire encounter has been eliminated, there will be no access to the Kiwi by the public in that manner any longer."

In December 2023, his new enclosure was reported by New Zealand news company, Stuff, that he was placed in a safer location with no fluorescent lights and had glass that removed 80% of incoming light, with more plants and a small pond added Plans for construction started on a more permanent enclosure on January 2024, this new enclosure would replace one of the gift shops. The enclosure was approved by the New Zealand Department of Conservation and funding was helped by the charity Save the Kiwi.

June 2026, 20 months after construction was due to be completed, Zoo Miami made a statement with Ron Magill saying, "Unfortunately, the original contractor failed to meet several critical requirements necessary for the habitat, resulting in a lengthy series of corrective actions and modifications that, even now, have not been fully resolved...The reality is that we are ultimately responsible for selecting and overseeing the contractor, and therefore we are accountable for these shortcomings. For that, I am profoundly sorry." As of October, 2026, no new developments have been shared.

== See also ==
- Gold Coast Railroad Museum (adjacent to Zoo Miami)
- Nonja (Malaysian orangutan)
- Rosie the Elephant
