= Nonja (Malaysian orangutan) =

Oldest known Sumatran orangutan (1952–2007)

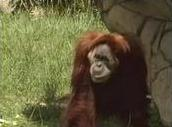
- Species: Sumatran orangutan
- Born: June 12 1952 unknown, captured in the wild
- Died: December 29, 2007 (aged 55); Miami MetroZoo; Miami, Florida, United States
- Known for: Likely being the world's oldest Orangutan upon death.

Nonja (June 12, 1952 – December 29, 2007) was a female Sumatran orangutan who was thought to be the oldest of her species in either the wild or captivity. She was 55 years old when she died in 2007. Most orangutans die before they reach their mid-40s, which made Nonja unique and likely the oldest living orangutan in the world at the time.

Nonja, whose name meant "girl" in Malaysian, was captured in the wild and brought to the Wassenaar Zoo in the Netherlands in 1955. She was thought to be about 2–3 years old at the time. She was transferred to the Miami MetroZoo (now Zoo Miami) on October 4, 1983, where she spent the rest of her life. Nonja gave birth to five children.

Nonja died at the Miami MetroZoo on Saturday, December 29, 2007. Experts believe that she died of either a brain tumor or an aneurysm.

== See also ==
- Zoo Miami
