= Ron Magill =

American wildlife photographer and communications director of the Zoo Miami

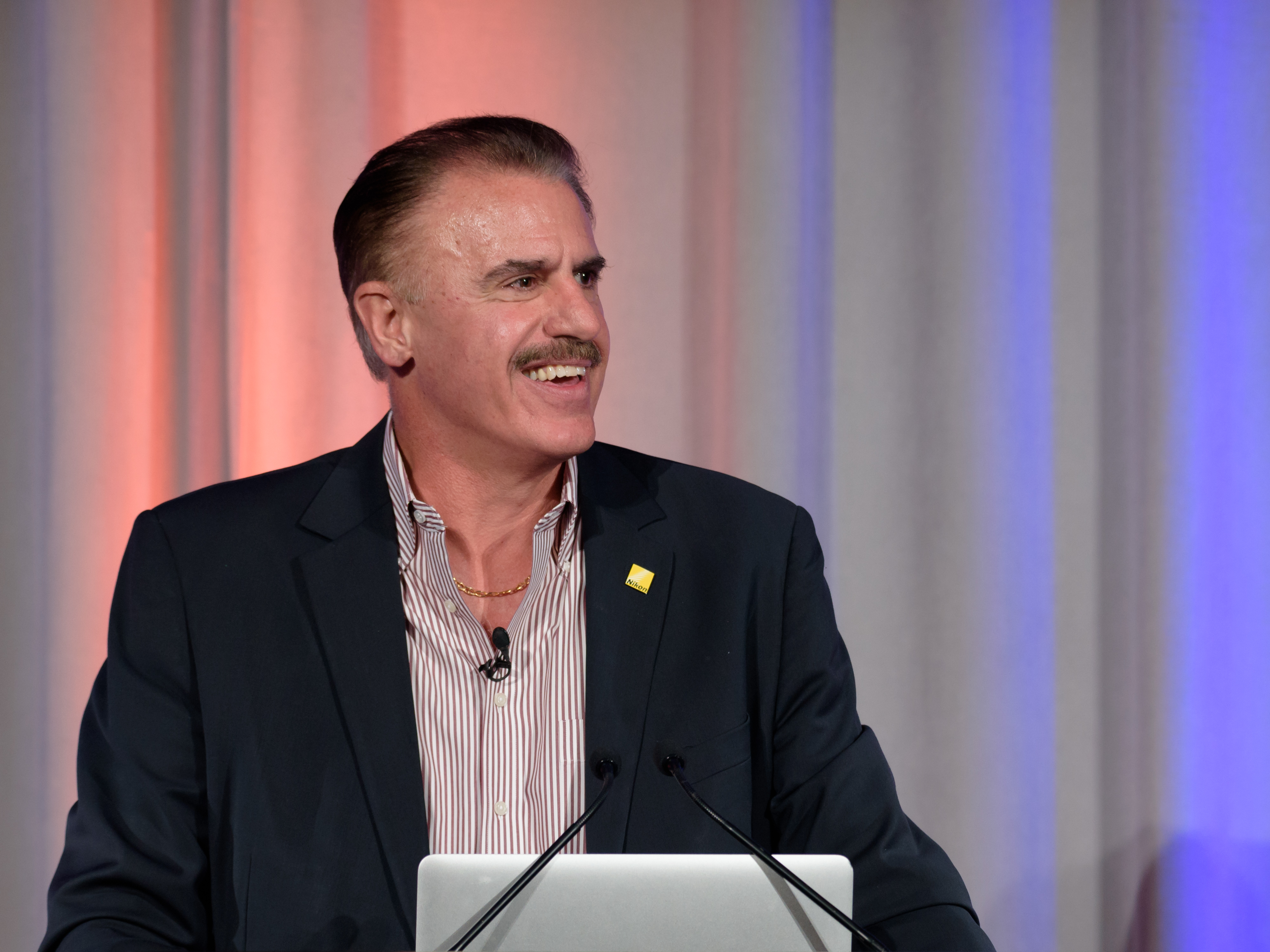
- Magill in 2019
- Born: Ronald Norman Magill; February 28, 1960 (age 66); Manhattan, New York City, New York
- Education: University of Florida
- Occupations: Photographer; communications director; animal doctor
- Employer: Zoo Miami
- Height: 6 ft 6 in (198 cm)
- Spouse: Rita Nickels (m. 1989)
- Children: 2
- Website: ronmagill.com

Ronald Norman Magill (born February 28, 1960) is an American wildlife photographer and the communications director of Zoo Miami (aka Miami-Dade Zoological Park and Gardens). Magill makes regular television appearances across local South Florida networks and has won five Emmy Awards for his work on nature documentary programs. With a Cuban father, he speaks both Spanish and English.

== Early life ==
Ron Magill's father Guillermo Magill spoke no English when he moved from Santiago, Cuba to New York and met his wife Lorraine. His mother grew up in New York and is of Colombian and German heritage. Born in 1960 in New York City, New York, Magill lived with his family in Jackson Heights, Queens, New York. Magill obtained an associate degree at the University of Florida.

== Career ==
Magill's first job was working at the Miami Serpentarium, which no longer exists. In 1980, he became a zookeeper at Crandon Park Zoo just before the facility moved across to the new Miami MetroZoo. He gradually became lead zookeeper, senior zookeeper and then assistant curator. Today, Magill remains at the renamed Miami-Dade Zoological Park and Gardens, as its communications director and makes appearances on television shows such as Good Morning America, and The Today Show. He appeared for over 25 years on the Spanish variety program Sábado Gigante until the show ended its over 50-year run in 2015. He has a regular segment on The Dan Le Batard Show with Stugotz, where listeners can call in and ask him questions, often humorous or irreverent. He has also appeared on several documentaries for the Discovery Channel and the History Channel, and, during the 1980s, handled many of the animals used on the Miami Vice television series.

== Awards and recognition ==
In 2006, Magill received the Wildlife Ambassador Award in recognition of his efforts on wildlife preservation. Magill was the founder of the Cheetah Ambassador Program at Zoo Miami. Magill is also a Nikon Ambassador. He has won five Emmy Awards for his work on the following nature documentary programs: Dreams of Alaska, The Amazon & Beyond, Alligator Love, and Dreams of the Rain Forest.
