= Boyd (1783 ship) =

Two-masted sailing vessel launched in 1783

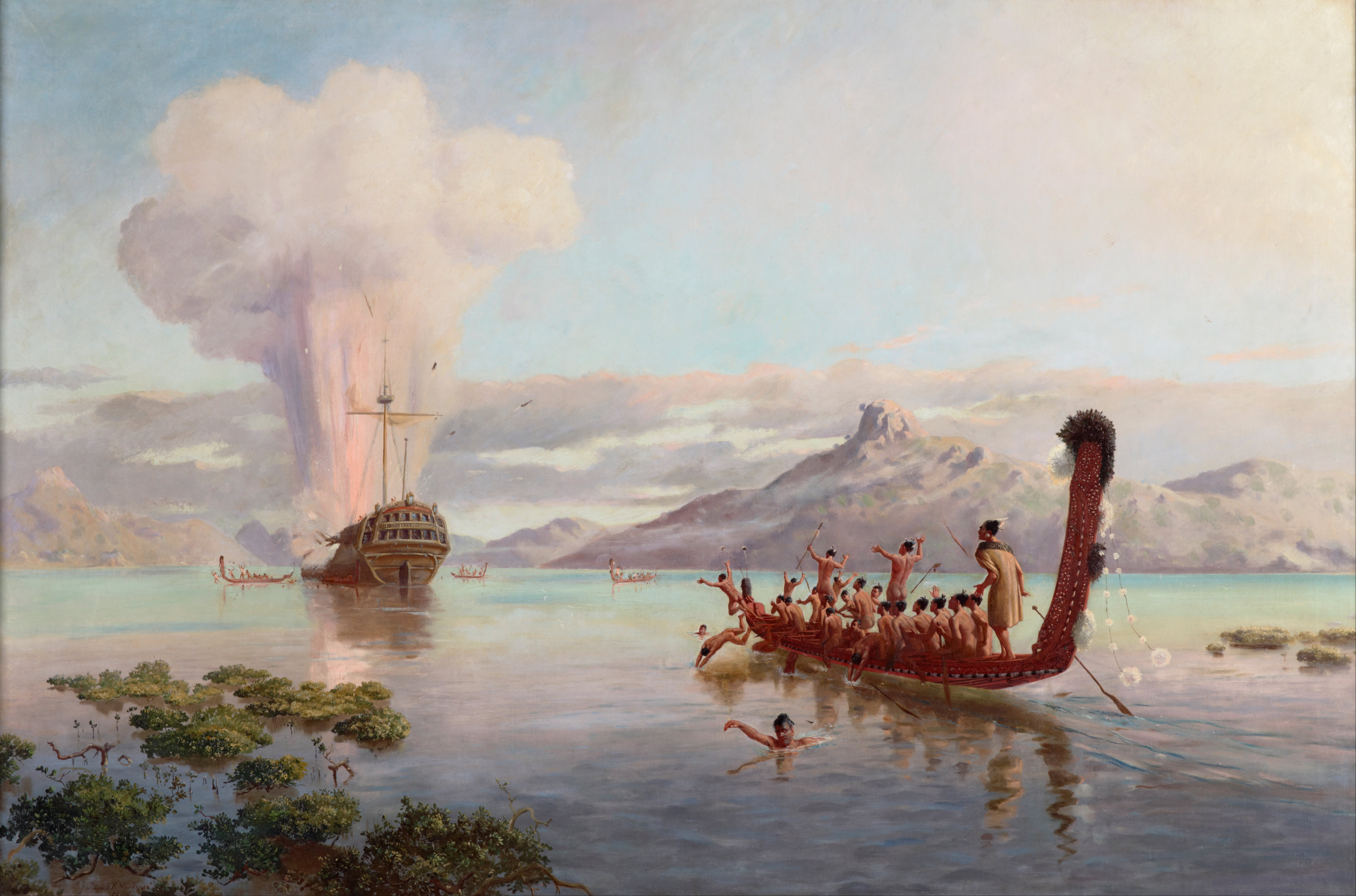
- The gunpowder stores blowing up on Boyd, painting by Louis John Steele (1889)

History

Great Britain
- Name: Boyd
- Owner: Captain & Co.; Boddington
- Builder: Hill, Limehouse, River Thames
- Launched: 1783
- Fate: Captured January 1797

France
- Acquired: January 1797 by capture
- Fate: Sold 1802–03 (Note: Hackman has Boyd being purchased from her captors and converted into a South Seas whaler, but leaves the timing ambiguous.)

Great Britain
- Name: Boyd
- Owner: Boddington
- Acquired: 1802–03 by purchase
- Fate: Burnt December 1809

General characteristics
- Tons burthen: 392, or 395, or 400, or 407, or 42554/94 (bm)
- Length: 109 ft 8 in (33.4 m) (overall); 87 ft 0 in (26.5 m)
- Beam: 29 ft 8 in (9.0 m)
- Depth of hold: 11 ft 11 in (3.6 m)
- Propulsion: Sail
- Complement: 28
- Armament: 1795: 6 × 6-pounder guns, or 10 × 6-pounder guns; 1805: 2 × 6-pounder guns + 6 × 12-pounder carronades; 1808: 8 × 6-pounder guns + 12 × 12-pounder carronades

Boyd was a brigantine built in 1783, at Limehouse on the river Thames, England. She originally traded as a West Indiaman, sailing between London and Saint Kitts. Then between 1795 and 1797, she performed a voyage for the British East India Company (EIC). The French captured her as she was homeward bound, but her owners repurchased her in 1803. In 1804, the French captured her again, but the Royal Navy recaptured her and returned her to her owners. In 1809, she transported convicts to New South Wales for the British government. After delivering the convicts she sailed to New Zealand where Maori warriors attacked her, killing and eating almost her entire crew and passengers. They then burnt her.

== Career ==
Boyd first appears in the supplemental pages of Lloyd's Register for 1783. Her master was James Young, her owner, "Capt. & Co.", and her trade London — St Kitts.

Lloyd's List reported on 19 September 1794, that Boyd, Young master, which had sailed from St Kitts had joined the Jamaica convoy after having separated from the Leeward Islands convoy in a violent gale on the Newfoundland Banks.

=== EIC voyage (1795–97) ===
In 1795, Lloyd's Register reported that Boyd's master was G. Sargent, her owner Boddington, and her trade London — St Kitts. An addendum to the entry showed her master changing to R. Young, and her trade to London — E. Indies.

She underwent a good repair in 1795, and before the EIC chartered Boyd as an "extra" ship they had her inspected and measured. The EIC records describe her as a three-decker vessel with ten gun ports on each side.

Her captain for the voyage was Robert Young. On 25 March 1795, he received a letter of marque.

Captain Young left Portsmouth on 8 July 1795, bound for St Helena and Bengal. On 5 September, she reached Rio de Janeiro, and on 10 November St Helena. By 24 December, she was at the Cape, and she arrived at Calcutta on 31 March 1796. Homeward bound from Calcutta she passed Kedgeree on 22 June, reached the Cape on 29 September, and St Helena on 28 October. On 8 January 1797 as she approached England the French captured her, and reportedly took her into Nantes. The EIC valued her cargo at £17,060.

=== French ownership ===
Between 1797 and some point during the period of the Peace of Amiens, Boyd was in French hands. Her name and career during this period is currently obscure.

=== British merchantman ===
Boyd, 20 years old, Thames-built, and of 392 tons (bm), reappears in Lloyd's Register in 1803. Her master is Dickson, her owner Boddington, and her trade is London—Grenada. At this remove one can only conjecture that Boddington purchased her during the Peace of Amiens.

In 1804, she received a new master, "Litson". He was sailing her to Grenada when she lost a rudder. She was part of a convoy under the escort of HMS Peterel. The convoy went on to Barbados, leaving Boyd at 13°34′N 51°0′W, some 600 miles east of Barbados. Shortly thereafter, a French vessel captured Boyd. However, on 19 May, HMS Galatea recaptured the "English ship Boyd", which was carrying "plantation stores". Galatea took her into Antigua.

On 12 November, still under Litson's command, Boyd arrived at The Downs from Liverpool. While she was west of Dungeness three privateers had chased her.

In 1805, Laughton (or Loughlon) replaced Litson as master. Also, Boddington now armed her. Her trade remained London — Dominica.

In 1809, Thompson replaced Laughton as master.

=== Convict transport ===
Under the command of Captain John Thompson, Boyd sailed from Cork, Ireland on 10 March 1809. She stopped at the Cape before she arrived at Port Jackson on 14 August 1809. She transported 139 male convicts, of whom five died on the voyage.

== Fate ==
Boyd sailed in October 1809, from Port Jackson to Whangaroa, New Zealand to pick up kauri spars. She was under the command of John Thompson and carried about 70 people. She anchored at Whangaroa where Māori warriors attacked her in December 1809. They killed and cannibalised 67 crew and passengers, during what became known as the Boyd massacre. Four passengers, a woman, a boy, and two children, survived. City of Edinburgh, Simon Pattison, master, was nearby and came and rescued them.

The Maori towed Boyd up the harbour to where they looted her. They accidentally detonated her gunpowder, which killed ten of them, and resulted in her burning to the waterline. (Note: One account dates the destruction to 10 July 1810. However, that is the date of the mention of the loss in Lloyd's List, which does not provide a date. Other accounts suggest the destruction happened within days of the massacre.)

In March 1810, half-a-dozen whalers gathered in Bay of Islands and launched a retributionary attack on the Maori. The whalers killed an estimated 16 to 60 Maori and burnt some structures. One sailor was accidentally killed. The vessels involved in the attack were Atalanta, Inspector, New Zealander, Perservernce, Speke, and Spring Grove.
