= City of Edinburgh (1807 ship) =

History

United Kingdom
- Name: City of Edinburgh
- Namesake: Edinburgh
- Acquired: 1807 by purchase of a prize
- Fate: Foundered 6 April 1812

General characteristics
- Tons burthen: 526 (bm)

City of Edinburgh was a Spanish vessel, built in France, that a British frigate brought into the Cape of Good Hope in 1807 as a prize. There investors purchased her to trade with the penal colony of Port Jackson. She foundered in 1812 near the Azores while en route from Lima to Cadiz.

== Career ==
Alexander Berry and Francis Shortt purchased a Spanish prize that they named City of Edinburgh. Their purpose was to carry provisions to New South Wales for sale there. On 4 September 1807 she left East London, South Africa with Pattison, master, and Berry, supercargo. She stopped at the Cape of Good Hope, Port Dalrymple, and Hobart, before she arrived at Port Jackson on 14 January 1808.

City of Edinburgh sailed for Norfolk Island on 25 May. She sailed to Norfolk Island to participate in the evacuation of the colony and the transfer of its inhabitants to Van Diemen's Land. She arrived at Norfolk Island on 4 June. Frequent storms and other issues delayed her departure until 9 September, when she left with some 250 settlers and their families, and some convicts. She then arrived at Hobart Town on 2 October. City of Edinburgh underwent some repairs at Hobart and then returned to Port Jackson on 18 November.

On 27 January 1809, City of Edinburgh sailed for Bay of Islands (New Zealand), Tongataboo Island (Tonga), Opuna (Vuna, Fiji), and then back to New Zealand. At Bay of Islands she underwent repairs while Berry arranged for the cutting of kauri trees for spars. She then sailed for Fiji. From Fiji City of Edinburgh sailed to Tonga. There, between July and August, she gathered sandalwood, before returning to Bay of Islands to retrieve the spars.

While City of Edinburgh was loading cargo at Bay of Islands, news came through of the Boyd Massacre, a massacre by local Māori of the crew and passengers of the ship Boyd. Pattison and Berry sailed City of Edinburgh to Whangaroa. There they were able to rescue four survivors and regain Boyd's papers.

City of Edinburgh sailed from New Zealand on 26 January 1810, with kauri spars for the Cape. She attempted sailing via Cape Horn but she was almost wrecked. Pattison made for Valparaiso. She underwent repairs there and he decided to sail to Cadiz. She was at Lima 15 October 1810.

== Fate ==
City of Edinburgh, Pattison, master, foundered on 6 April 1812 in the Atlantic Ocean 46 leagues (138 nautical miles (256 km) off the Azores with the loss of seven of her 51 crew. Fame, Pringle, master, coming from Terceira, rescued the survivors and brought them into Fowey, where they arrived on 17 May. City of Edinburgh was on a voyage from Lima to Cádiz, Spain.
