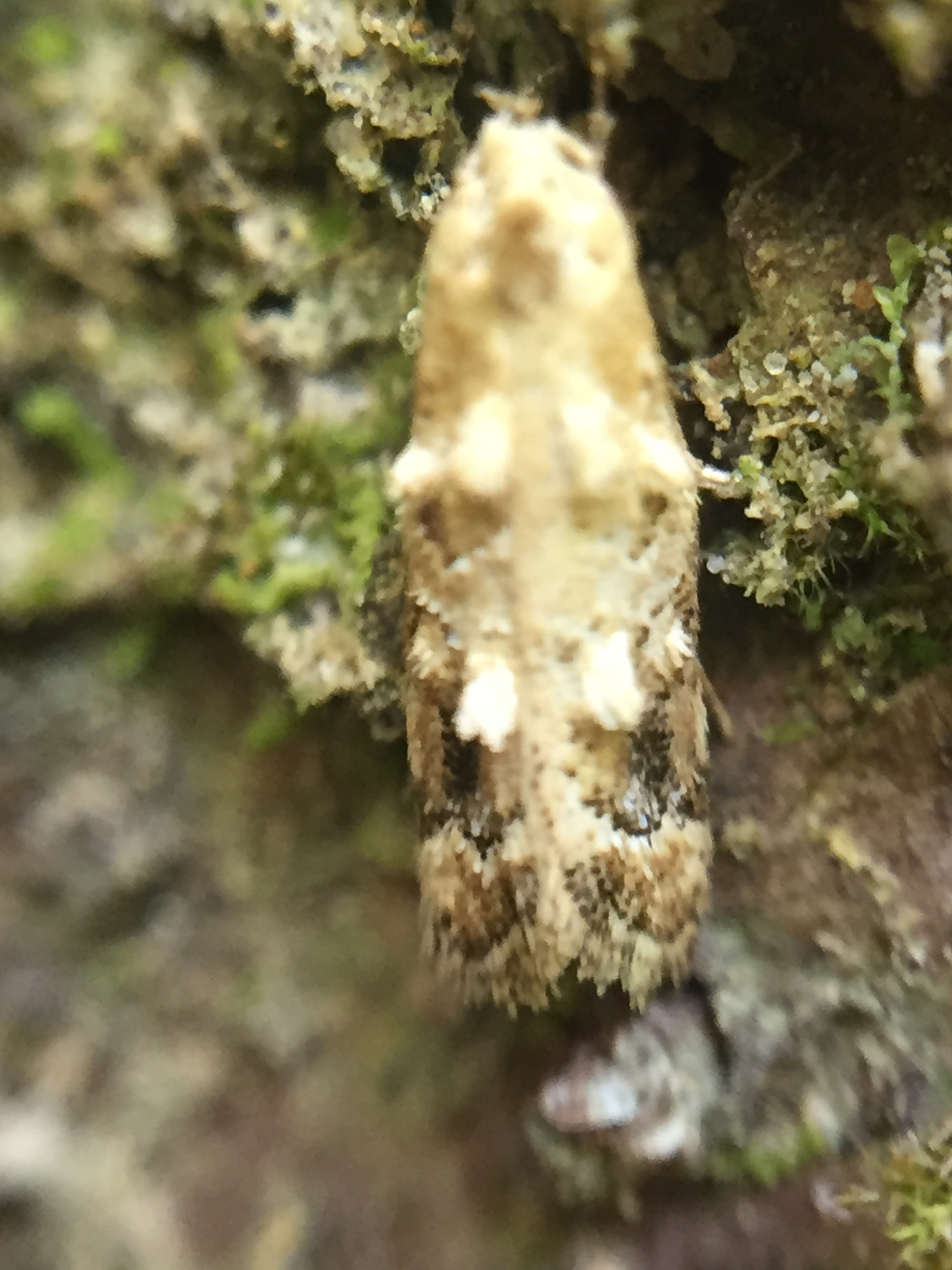

Scientific classification
- Kingdom: Animalia
- Phylum: Arthropoda
- Class: Insecta
- Order: Lepidoptera
- Family: Oecophoridae
- Genus: Trachypepla
- Species: T. aspidephora

Binomial name
- Trachypepla aspidephora Meyrick, 1883

= Trachypepla aspidephora =

Species of moth endemic to New Zealand

Trachypepla aspidephora is a species of moth in the family Oecophoridae. It is endemic to New Zealand and has been observed in the North and South Islands. Adults are on the wing from November to March and are attracted to light. The moths can be found resting on tree trunks where their colouration imitates lichens.

== Taxonomy ==
This species was first described in 1883 by Edward Meyrick and named Trachypepla aspidephora. Later that same year Meyrick gave another abbreviated description of the species. In 1884 Meyrick gave a much fuller description of T. aspidephora. In 1928 George Hudson discussed and illustrated this species. The male lectotype specimen, collected at heir colouration imitated lichens, in the Port Hills of Christchurch, is held at the Natural History Museum, London.

== Description ==
Meyrick described the adults of this species as follows:

Male, female. — 13 1/2 - 14 1/2 mm. Head and antennae whitish-ochreous. Palpi whitish-ochreous, mixed with dark fuscous, terminal joint with a blackish subapical ring. Thorax whitish-ochreous, anterior margin mixed with dark fuscous. Abdomen pale whitish-ochreous. Legs dark fuscous, a central ring of median tibiae, hairs of posterior tibiae, and apex of all joints ochreous-white. Forewings elongate, costa moderately arched, slightly sinuate in middle, apex rounded, hindmargin very obliquely rounded; whitish, irregularly suffused with whitish-ochreous; basal 2/5 of costa dark grey, with a small blackish basal spot; an obscurely indicated slender blackish transverse line in disc before middle, nearly rectangularly angulated, wholly obsolete towards margins, preceded by two tufts of raised pale ochreous scales above and below middle; a small elongate cloudy dark grey spot along costa somewhat beyond middle, beneath which is a raised ochreous partially blackish-circled spot in disc, and between this and anal angle another raised tuft; a cloudy blackish-grey elongate outwards-curved spot extending from 3/4 of costa to the blackish-circled discal, more or less suffused beneath; from this near costa proceeds a transverse blackish line to anal angle, obtusely angulated outwards in middle; a cloudy blackish-grey apical spot, rather produced along hindmargin : cilia ochreous-whitish, with two cloudy blackish lines. Hindwings grey- whitish, apex darker; cilia whitish, with a cloudy grey line.

== Distribution ==
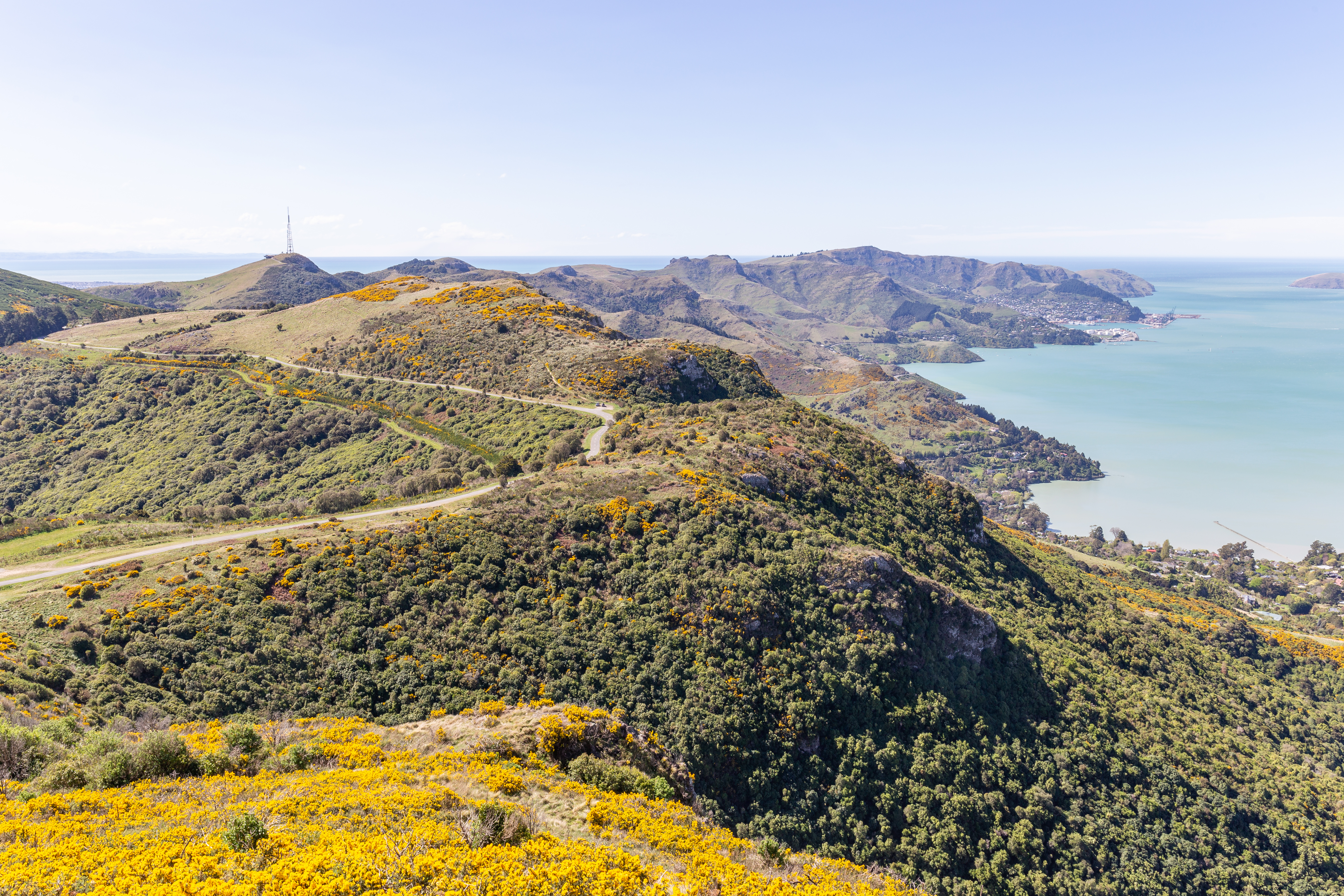
Port Hills, type locality of species.

This species is endemic to New Zealand and has been collected in the North and South Islands. T. aspidephora has been observed in Kaeo in Northland, Auckland, Wellington, Nelson, Mount Arthur, Christchurch, Dunedin and Invercargill.

== Behaviour ==
Adults of this species are on the wing from November to March. Hudson noted that the adults were frequently found resting on tree trunks and that their colouration imitated lichens. Adult moths are attracted to light.
