= Atalanta (1798 ship) =

History

Great Britain
- Builder: Holland
- Launched: 1795
- Acquired: 1798 by purchase of a prize
- Fate: Last listed in 1833

General characteristics
- Tons burthen: 137, or 138, or 140, or 145 (bm)
- Sail plan: Brig
- Complement: 1801:14; 1803: 15; 1810: 16
- Armament: 1801: 8 × 6-pounder guns; 1803: 8 × 6-pounder guns; 1808: 10 × 9-pounder + 2 × 6-pounder guns; 1810: 6 guns

Atalanta was launched in Holland in 1795, perhaps under another name. She was captured in 1798, and thereafter traded generally as a British merchantman. She was brig-rigged. (Note: Some volumes of Lloyd's Register refer to her as a snow, similar to a brig.) Between 1801 and 1804 she made two voyages as a slave ship in the triangular trade in enslaved people, and may have been temporarily captured during the second. She then became a West Indiaman. Next, between 1808 and 1814, she made two voyages as a whaler in Australian and New Zealand waters. After the whaling voyages she traded more widely, especially to the Baltic. She was last listed in 1833.

== Career ==
Atalanta first appeared in Lloyd's Register (LR) in 1798.

| Year | Master | Owner | Trade | Source & notes |
|---|---|---|---|---|
| 1798 | C.Jones | Capt. & Co. | Dartmouth–Newfoundland | LR |
| 1799 | C.Jones; Graham? Conway | Capt. & Co. Jones | Dartmouth–Newfoundland; Waterford–London | |
| 1800 | Conway; Martin | Cuming | London–Belfast | LR |
| 1801 | Martin; R.Wilson | Cuming; Earle & Co. | Belfast–Liverpool; Liverpool–Africa | LR |

1st enslaving voyage (1801–1802): Captain Robert Wilson acquired a letter of marque on 13 June 1801. Atlanta sailed from Liverpool on 17 July 1801, bound for West Africa. She arrived at Kingston, Jamaica on 13 April 1802 with 92 captives. She sailed from Kingston on 13 June 1802 and arrived back at Liverpool on 18 October. She had left Liverpool with 34 crew members and she had suffered nine crew deaths on the voyage.

2nd slave voyage (1803): Captain Robert Wilson acquired a letter of marque on 27 July 1803. Atalanta sailed from Liverpool on 8 August 1803. On 25 June 1804 the French privateer Grand Bonaparte, of 20 guns and 200 men, captured Atalanta, Wilson master after an engagement of one hour. The French took her into Guadeloupe.

It is not clear that the capture took place. If it did, Atalanta returned to British ownership quickly by means that are currently obscure. Common means were recapturing, ransoming, or purchase. Ownership of Atalanta changed between her capture and her return to service.

| Year | Master | Owner | Trade | Source & notes |
|---|---|---|---|---|
| 1804 | R.Wilson; M.Stanton | Earle & Co. M.Stanton | Liverpool–Africa | LR; |
| 1805 | M.Stanton; Crawford | M.Stanton; J.Palmer | Liverpool–Demerara | LR; annotation "captured" struck out |
| 1806 | Crawford; Keafe | J.Palmer | Liverpool–Demerara; Liverpool–Buenos Ayres | LR; small repairs 1805 |
| 1809 | J.Keafe; Morris | J.Koster | Liverpool–Buenos Aires | LR; small repairs 1805 |
| 1810 | Morris | J.Koster | London–Rio de Janeiro | LR; small repairs 1805 |
| 1812 | [Joseph] Morris | [William] Wilson & Co. | London–South Seas | LR; repairs 1805 |

1st whaling voyage (1808–1811): Atalanta, Josh(or Joseph) Morris, master, sailed from Gravesend on 4 December 1808, bound for Rio de Janeiro and arrived there on 4 February 1809. She arrived at Port Jackson on 25 July, bringing merchandise. She sailed for the fisheries on 16 October, or 23 October.

In March 1810, sailors from five whaling ships (Atalanta, Diana, Experiment, Perseverance, Speke, and New Zealander) in Bay of Islands, launched a punitive attack on some Māoris following the massacre of the crew of Boyd. The attack resulted in the deaths of between 16 and 60 Māori and one sailor.

Atalanta returned to Port Jackson from the River Derwent on 29 August 1810 with 125 tons of right whale oil. She left for England on 28 October. She arrived back at London with 125 tons of black oil.

2nd whaling voyage (1811–1814): Captain Morris sailed from Gravesend on 17 August 1811, bound for Rio de Janeiro. She sailed from Portsmouth on 4 September, bound for the South Seas. Atalanta, Morris, master, arrived at Port Jackson on 19 March 1812 with a cargo of sundries. A different newspaper account reports that Atalanta reached Rio on 30 November and sailed from there on 1 January 1812. By this account she arrived at Port Jackson on 12 May after stopping in the River Derwent.

Atalanta left for the fisheries on 21 July 1812. She returned to Port Jackson from the fisheries on 22 July 1813 with a cargo of sperm oil. She left on 8 September, bound for Norfolk Island and the fishery. (Note: Lloyd's List reported that the USS Essex had captured the South Seasman Atalanta, but that was Atlantic, sometimes referred to Atalanta.) Atalanta, Morris, master, arrived back at Deal on 18 November 1814 and Gravesend on 24 November.

| Year | Master | Owner | Trade | Source |
|---|---|---|---|---|
| 1816 | Morris | Wilson & Co. | London–South Seas | LR |
| 1818 | Smith | W.Osborne | London–Brazil | LR; thorough repair 1817 |
| 1820 | Smith; W.King | W.Osborne | London–Hamburg | LR; thorough repair 1817 & good repair 1819 |
| 1822 | W.King | Roschild | London–Hamburg | LR; thorough repair 1817 & good repair 1819 |
| 1824 | W.King | Roschild | London–Petersburg | LR; thorough repair 1817, good repair 1819, & good repair 1822 |
| 1830 | W.King; J.Hawkins | Roschild | London–Petersburg | LR; thorough repair 1817, good repair 1819, & good repair 1822 |
| 1831 | J.Hawkins | Downe | London–Faro | LR; thorough repair 1817, good repair 1819, & good repair 1822 |
| 1832 | J.Hawkins | Downe & Co. | Cork | LR; thorough repair 1817, good repair 1819, & good repair 1822 |

== Fate ==
Atalanta was last listed in 1833.
