= Motukawanui Island =

Island in the Cavalli Islands, New Zealand

- Interactive map of Motukawanui Island

Geography
- Location: Cavalli Islands
- Coordinates: 35°0′0″S 173°56′30″E
- Area: 3.545 km^{2} (1.369 sq mi)
- Highest elevation: 177 m (581 ft)

Administration
- New Zealand

Motukawanui Island is the largest of the Cavalli Islands, and is located approximately four kilometres northeast of Matauri Bay, north of the Bay of Islands in northern New Zealand. The island has an area of 355 ha (880 acres)

== History ==
The island had a large Māori population when Captain Cook visited the island group in 1769. The large number of pits and terrace sites, middens and cultivations all suggest a substantial population existed on the island.

== Geography ==
The highest point of the island, Maungapouri, reaches an altitude of 177 metres. Parts of the island was farmed up until 1974 and the pastoral grassland is now being left to generate into native vegetation and many stands of kānuka and mānuka are already giving protection to a variety of young native trees.

The shores of Motukawanui have a variety of marine life. Papatara Bay is a safe anchorage in most weather conditions and although most of the coastline is rugged, there are some pleasant sand and shingle beaches around the island.

== Wildlife ==
Motukawanui Island has been a flourishing breeding ground for the North Island brown kiwi since the island was cleared of predators namely possums and mustelids.
