= Cavalli Islands =

Group of islands in New Zealand

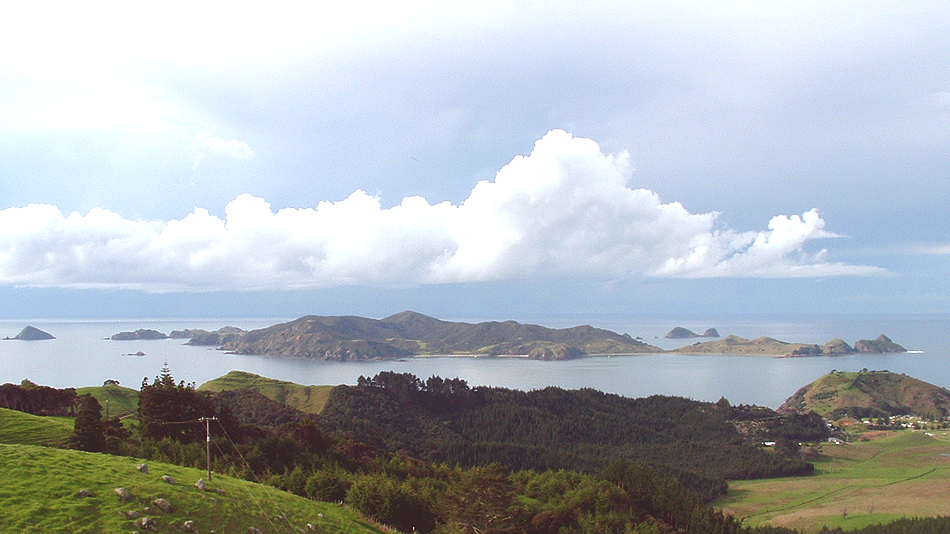
- The Cavallis. The knobby hill to the right on the mainland is at the northern extremity of Matauri Bay.
- Interactive map of Cavalli Islands

Geography
- Location: Matauri Bay; Whangaroa
- Coordinates: 35°0′S 173°57′E
- Total islands: 27
- Area: 4.5 km^{2} (1.7 sq mi)
- Highest elevation: 177 m (581 ft)

Administration
- New Zealand

The Cavalli Islands are a small group of islands near Whangaroa on Northland's East Coast in northern New Zealand. They lie 3 kilometres (1.9 mi) to the east of Matauri Bay on the mainland.

The group consists of the island of Motukawanui (area 3.55 km^{2} (1.37 sq mi)) and the smaller islets of Motutapere, Panaki, Nukutaunga, Haraweka, Motuharakeke, and Motukawaiti Islands. The main island is used as a nature reserve, and some of the smaller islands are privately owned.

The Cavallis were so named by Captain James Cook on 27 December 1769 during his first voyage of discovery. In his journal he recorded that some Māori "sold us some fish--Cavallys as they are called--which occasioned my giving the Islands the same name". Cook probably meant trevally which is abundant near the islands, known to the Māori as araara.

On 2 December 1987, the hull of the bombed Greenpeace vessel Rainbow Warrior was scuttled between Matauri Bay and the Cavalli Islands, to serve as a dive wreck and fish sanctuary.

== See also ==
- List of islands of New Zealand
