= Boyd massacre =

New Zealand cannibalism incident

Coordinates: 35.047°S 173.745°E

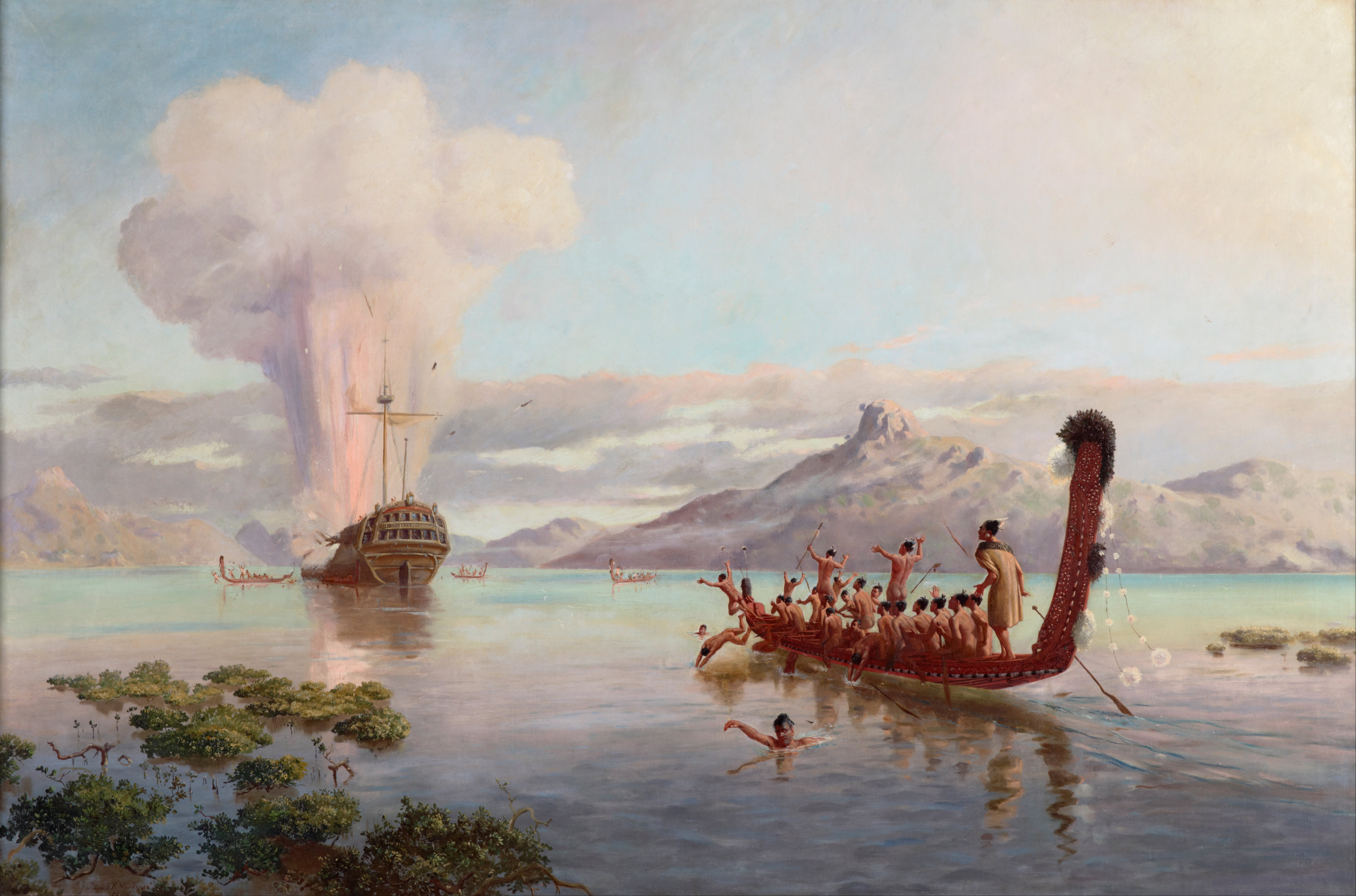
- The Blowing Up of the Boyd by Louis John Steele, 1889
- Location: Whangaroa Harbour
- Date: December 1809
- Attack type: Mass murder, cannibalism
- Deaths: 66-70
- Perpetrator: Whangaroa Harbour Ngāti Pou
- Motive: Revenge/utu

The Boyd massacre occurred in December 1809 when Māori of Ngāti Pou from Whangaroa Harbour in northern New Zealand killed and ate between 66 and 70 European passengers and crew members from the British brigantine Boyd. This was the highest number of Europeans killed by Māori in a single event in New Zealand.

The Māori attack was in retaliation for the whipping of their rangatira or chief of Ngāti Pou, Te Ara, on his voyage back from Sydney Cove, New South Wales aboard the Boyd. Te Ara had been accused of onboard theft and was punished with a cat o' nine tails. According to another version, he was the son of a chief and had been punished because he had refused to pay for his passage on the ship by working as a seaman. Local people were already tense and inflamed after a previous ship had brought disease to the area. Three days after the Boyd moored at Whangaroa, the Māori launched a night attack, killing the crew. After capturing the ship, the passengers were taken on deck where they were killed and dismembered. A few Europeans managed to hide and others were taken ashore, in a rescue attempt, by another Māori chief who had come to trade with the Boyd.

In March 1810, European whalers attacked the island pā of Chief Te Pahi of Ngāpuhi about 60 km south-east of Whangaroa in retribution for the Boyd killings in the mistaken belief that these Māori had ordered the killings. Between 16 and 60 Maori and one European died in the clash. News of the events delayed the first missionary visits to the country, and caused the number of shipping visits to fall to "almost nothing" over the next few years.

After the massacre, the Māori took the Boyd back to their village where they tried to extract the gunpowder from the barrels in the hold. The gunpowder ignited when a flint was struck burning the ship down to the waterline of its copper sheathing. The Māori declared the burnt-out hull tapu, sacred or prohibited.

== Background ==
Boyd was a 395-ton (bm) brigantine that had brought convicts to New South Wales. In October 1809, it sailed from Australia's Sydney Cove to Whangaroa on the east coast of New Zealand's Northland Peninsula to pick up kauri spars. The ship was under the command of Captain John Thompson and carried about 70 people.

The ship carried several passengers, including ex-convicts who had completed their transportation sentences and four or five New Zealanders who were returning to their homeland. Among the latter was Te Ara, or Tarrah, known to the crew as George, the son of a Māori chief from Whangaroa. Te Ara had spent more than a year on board different vessels that included a sealing expedition to islands in the Southern Ocean.

On the Boyd he was expected to work his passage on the ship. Some accounts state that he declined to do so because he was ill or because of his status as a chief's son. Another account states that the ship's cook accidentally threw some pewter spoons overboard and accused Te Ara of stealing them to avoid being flogged himself. Alexander Berry, in a letter describing the events, said: "The captain had been rather too hasty in resenting some slight theft."

Whatever the reason, the result was that the captain deprived Te Ara of food and had him tied to a capstan and whipped with a cat-o'-nine-tails.

This treatment of Te Ara prompted him to seek utu, or revenge. Te Ara regained the confidence of the captain and persuaded him to put into Whangaroa Bay, assuring him that it was the best place to secure the timber he desired.

Upon reaching Whangaroa, Te Ara reported his indignities to his tribe and displayed the whip marks on his back. In accordance with Māori customs, the tribe formed a plan for utu. Under British law, whipping was the common punishment for minor crimes – a British person could be legally hanged for stealing goods to the value of five shillings. In Māori culture, however, the son of a chief was a privileged figure who did not bow to an outsider's authority. Physical punishment of his son caused the chief to suffer a loss of face (or "mana"), and to Māori this warranted a violent retribution.

== Massacre ==
=== Killings ===
Three days after Boyd's arrival, the Māori invited Captain Thompson to follow their canoes to find suitable kauri trees. Thompson, his chief officer and three others followed the canoes to the entrance of the Kaeo River. The remaining crew stayed aboard with the passengers, preparing the vessel for the voyage to Britain.

When the boats were out of sight of Boyd, the Māori attacked the five pākehā (foreigners), killing them all with clubs and axes. The Māori stripped the clothes from the victims and a group donned them to disguise themselves as Europeans. Another group carried the bodies to their pā (village) to be eaten.

At dusk the disguised group manned the longboat, and at nightfall they slipped alongside the Boyd and were greeted by the crew. Other Māori canoes awaited the signal to attack. The first to die was an officer of the ship: the attackers then crept around the deck, stealthily killing all the crew. The passengers were called to the deck and then killed and dismembered. Five people hid up the mast among the rigging, where they witnessed the events.

=== Survivors ===
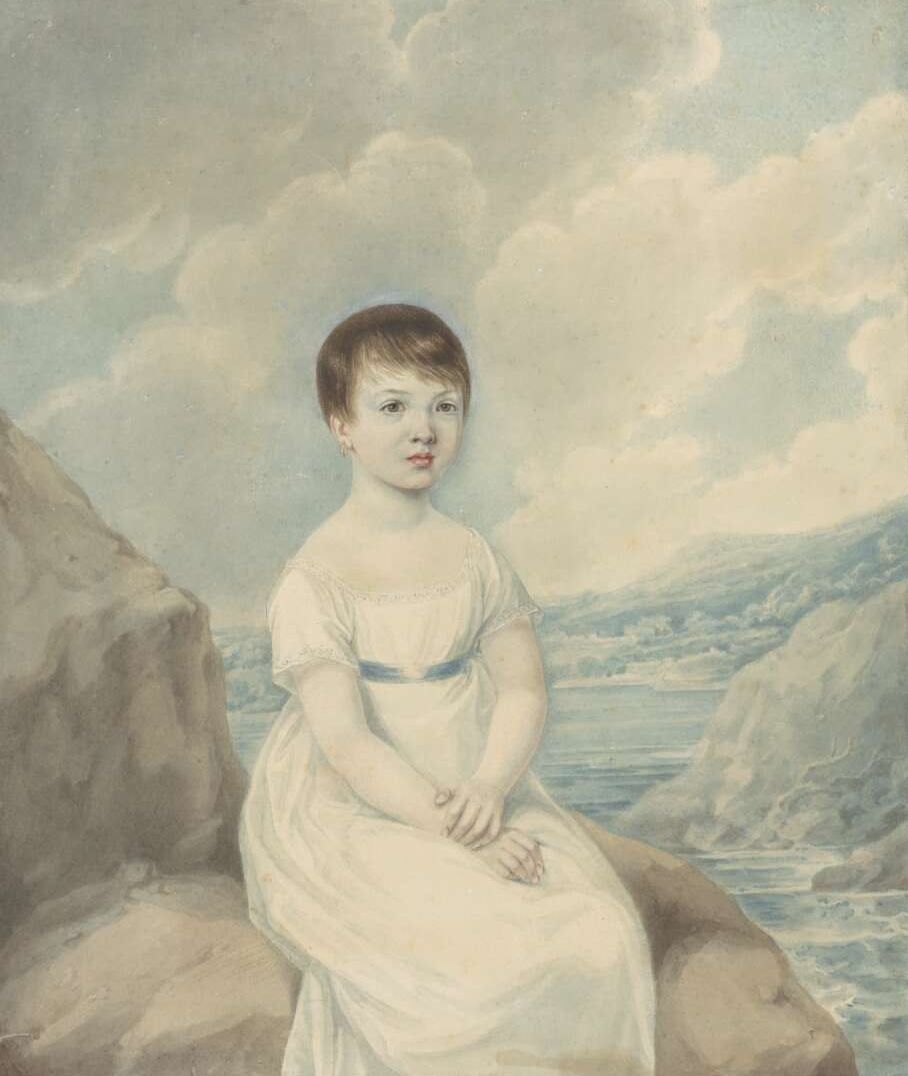
Portrait of Elizabeth "Betsey" Broughton, painted in Sydney in 1814 by convict artist Richard Read Sr., National Library of Australia

The next morning the survivors saw a large canoe carrying chief Te Pahi from the Bay of Islands enter the harbour. The chief had come to the area to trade with the Whangaroa Māori. The Europeans called out to Te Pahi's canoe for help. After Te Pahi had gathered the survivors from the Boyd, they headed for shore, but two Whangaroa canoes pursued them. As the survivors fled along the beach, Te Pahi watched as the pursuers caught and killed all but one.

Five people were spared in the massacre: Ann Morley and her baby, in a cabin; apprentice Thomas Davis (or Davison), hidden in the hold; the second mate; and two-year-old Elizabeth "Betsey" Broughton, taken by a local chief who put a feather in her hair and kept her for three weeks before she was rescued. The second mate was initially forced to make fish-hooks, but his captors found his skill unsatisfactory, so they killed and ate him, too.

=== Wreck ===
The Whangaroa Māori towed Boyd towards their village until it grounded on mudflats near Motu Wai (Red Island). They spent several days ransacking the ship, tossing flour, salt pork, and bottled wine overboard.

When up to 20 Māori found a cache of muskets and gunpowder, they smashed barrels of gunpowder and attempted to make the muskets functional. One of them sparked a flint which was said to have ignited the gunpowder, causing a massive explosion that killed him and a number of other Māori instantly. A fire then swept the ship igniting its cargo of whale oil. Soon all that was left of Boyd was a burnt-out sunken hull. Māori declared the hull tapu, sacred or prohibited.

== Rescue ==
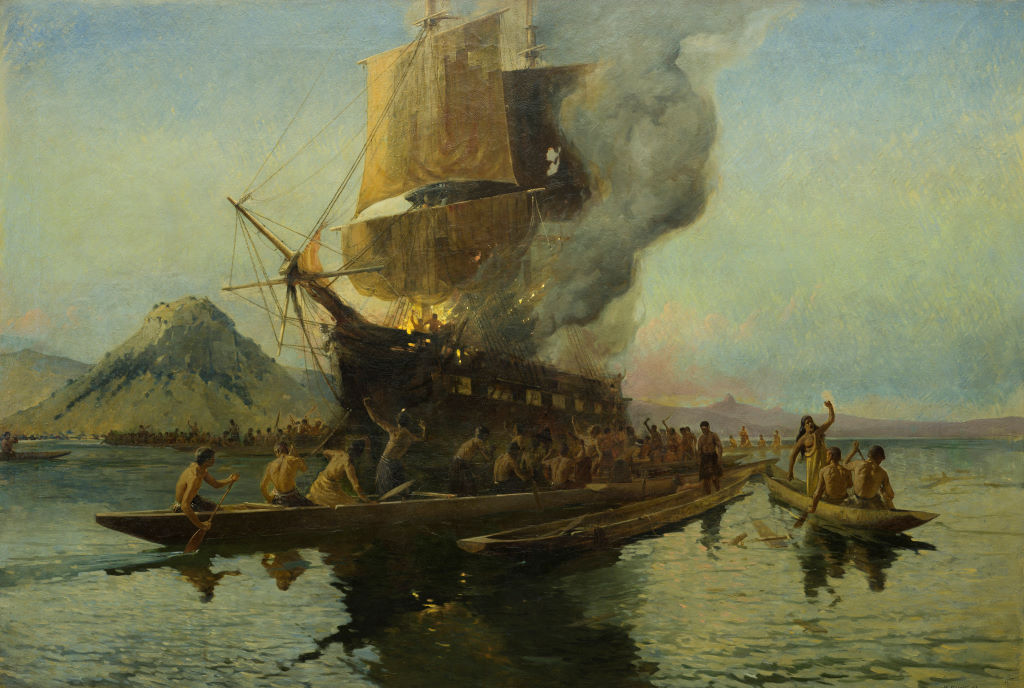
Walter Wright's The Burning of the Boyd was executed in 1908 and is one of his best known paintings

When news of the massacre reached Kororāreka, Alexander Berry undertook a rescue mission in boats from the City of Edinburgh. Berry rescued the four remaining survivors: Ann Morley and her baby, Thomas Davis (or Davison), and Betsy Broughton.

The City of Edinburgh crew found piles of human bones on the shoreline, with many evincing cannibalism.

Berry captured two Māori chiefs responsible for the massacre, at first holding them for ransom for the return of survivors. After the survivors were returned, Berry told the chiefs that they would be taken to Europe to answer for their crimes unless they released the Boyd's papers. After the papers were given to him, he released the chiefs. He made it a condition of their release that they would be "degraded from their rank, and received among the number of his slaves", although he never expected this condition to be complied with. They expressed gratitude for the mercy. Berry's gesture avoided further bloodshed, an inevitability had the chiefs been executed.

The four people rescued were taken on board Berry's ship bound for the Cape of Good Hope. However, the ship encountered storms and was damaged, and after repairs arrived in Lima, Peru. Mrs Morley died while in Lima. The boy, called Davis or Davison, went from Lima to England aboard the Archduke Charles, and later worked for Berry in New South Wales. He drowned while exploring the entrance to the Shoalhaven River with Berry in 1822. Mrs Morley's child and Betsy Broughton were taken onwards by Berry to Rio de Janeiro, from where they returned to Sydney in May 1812 aboard Atalanta. Betsy Broughton married Charles Throsby, nephew of the explorer Charles Throsby, and died in 1891.

== Aftermath ==
In March 1810, sailors from five whaling ships (Atalanta, Diana, Experiment, Perseverance, Speke, and New Zealander) launched a revenge attack. Their target was the pa on Motu Apo island in Wairoa Bay belonging to Te Pahi, the chief who tried to rescue the Boyd survivors and then saw them killed. Te Pahi had later accepted one of the Boyd's small boats and some other booty, and his name was confused with that of Te Puhi, who was one of the plotters of the massacre. This was the belief of Samuel Marsden, the prominent early missionary who said it was Te Ara (George) and his brother Te Puhi who took Boyd as revenge. In the attack between 16 and 60 Māori and one sailor were killed.

Te Pahi, who was wounded in the neck and chest, realised that the sailors had attacked him because of the actions of the Whangaroa Maori. Some time before 28 April, he gathered his remaining warriors and attacked Whangaroa, where he was killed by a spear thrust.

News of the Boyd massacre reached Australia and Europe, delaying a planned visit of missionaries until 1814. A notice was printed and circulated in Europe advising against visiting "that cursed shore" of New Zealand, at the risk of being eaten by cannibals.

Shipping to New Zealand "fell away to almost nothing" during the next three years.

== Cultural references ==
Details of the massacre have featured in many non-fiction publications. One of the most comprehensive was:

- The Burning of the 'Boyd' - A Saga of Culture Clash (1984), Wade Doak

The massacre was the subject of a 2010 New Zealand children's book:

- The Shadow of the Boyd, by Diana Menefy

Historical fiction references include:

- The Boyd Massacre: The true and terrible story of, (2005), ISBN 978-0646447957, Ian Macdonald (a descendant of Boyd survivor Betsey Broughton)
- Burning the Evidence by Terri Kessell, ISBN 978-1877340147, follows Ann Morley, who lived with Maori for some months before her rescue by Alexander Berry

The massacre has also featured in several paintings:

- Louis Auguste Sainson, The Boyd Incident, (1839)
- Louis John Steele, The Blowing Up of the Boyd, (1889)
- Walter Wright, The Burning of the Boyd, (1908)

== See also ==
- List of massacres in New Zealand

== Notes ==
Citations

References

- A comprehensive report by Tony Flude
- "BOYD", MASSACRE OF, from An Encyclopaedia of New Zealand, edited by A. H. McLintock, 1966. Te Ara - The Encyclopedia of New Zealand, updated 18 September 2007.
- The Massacre of the Boyd, 1809 and 1810 and After the Massacre, 1810 to 1814, Chapters 10 and 11 in From Tasman To Marsden: A History of Northern New Zealand from 1642 to 1818, by Robert McNab. Published by J. Wilkie & Company, Dunedin, 1914.
- Massacre of the Boyd, in Chapter 1, in Christianity Among The New Zealanders, by the Right Rev. William Williams, D.C.L., Bishop of Waiapu. Seeley, Jackson, and Halliday, London, 1867.
