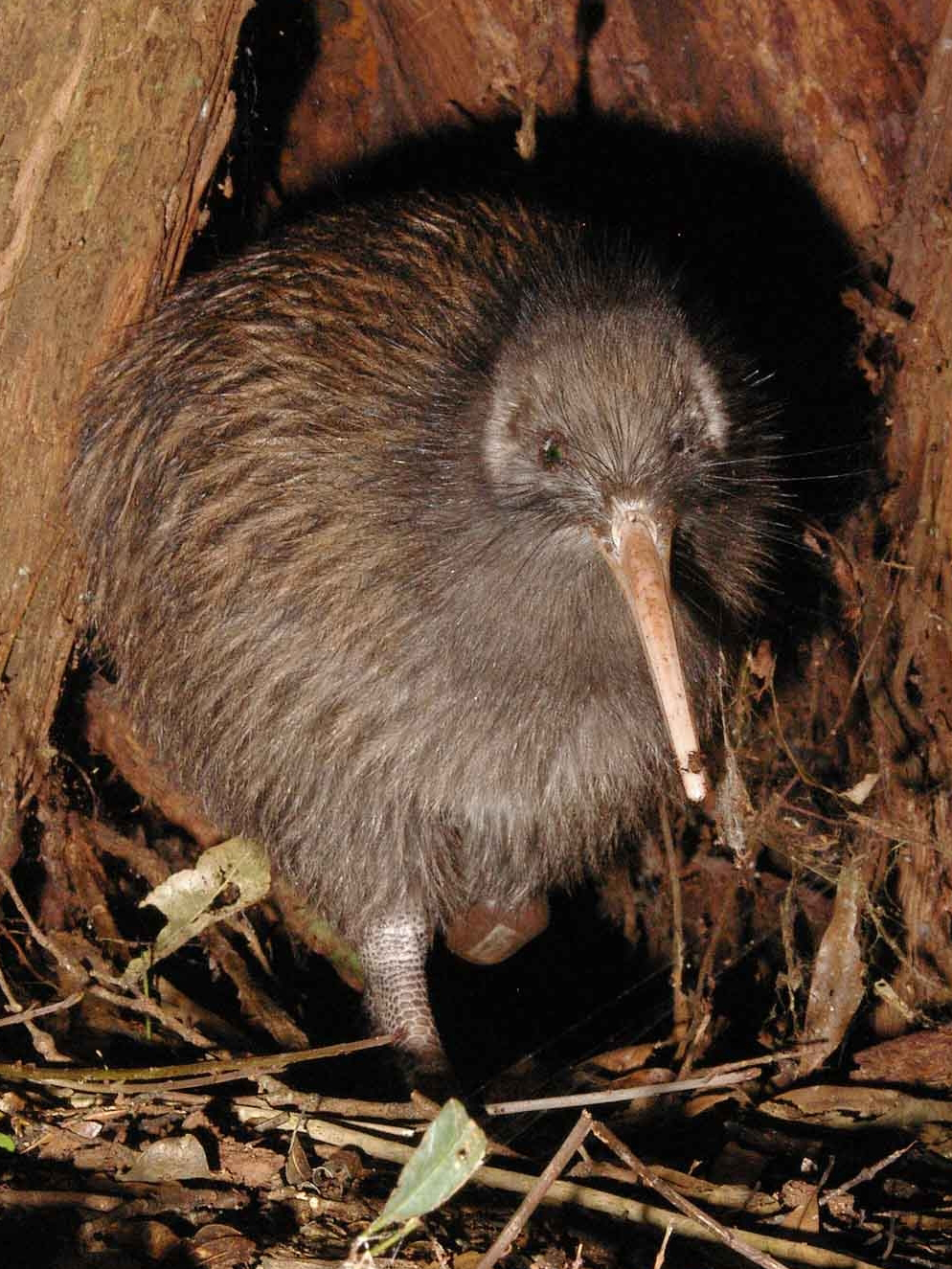

Conservation status
- Vulnerable (IUCN 3.1)

Scientific classification
- Kingdom: Animalia
- Phylum: Chordata
- Class: Aves
- Infraclass: Palaeognathae
- Order: Apterygiformes
- Family: Apterygidae
- Genus: Apteryx
- Species: A. mantelli

Binomial name
- Apteryx mantelli Bartlett, 1852
- Range of North Island brown kiwi

Synonyms
- List: Dromiceius novaezelandiae Lesson, 1828 nomen nudum; Apteryx mantelli novaezelandiae Lesson, 1828; Apteryx australis novaezealandiae Lesson, 1828; Apteryx australis mantelli Bartlett, 1852; Apteryx mantelli mantelli Bartlett, 1852; Apteryx bulleri Sharpe, 1888

Audio
- Male song

= North Island brown kiwi =

Species of flightless bird

The North Island brown kiwi (Apteryx mantelli) is a nocturnal flightless bird and species of kiwi that is widespread in the northern two-thirds of the North Island of New Zealand. Its population was estimated in 2015 to be 26,600 of which mature individuals numbered between 10,000 and 19,999. It is the most common kiwi species. The eggs laid by the North Island brown kiwi are among the largest eggs relative to its body size.

== Taxonomy ==
The North Island brown kiwi was formally described in 1852 by the English zoologist Abraham Dee Bartlett based on a specimen that had been collected by the son of Walter Mantell on the North Island of New Zealand. Bartlett coined the current binomial name Apteryx mantelli where the specific epithet was chosen to honour the collector's father. The species is monotypic: no subspecies are recognised.

== Description ==
It is a large brown kiwi, possessing spiky, streaked feathers. North Island brown kiwi display size-based sexual dimorphism, where the females are observably larger than the males. The males weigh between 1.44–3.06 kg (3.2–6.7 lb) and females weigh between 2.06–3.85 kg (4.5–8.5 lb). The long bill measures 13–20.5 cm (5.1–8.1 in) in length.

Museum specimen of a rare white (albino) A. mantelli

In 2004, an injured bird was found with streaked white around the head and identified by Massey University. The white feathering was likely due to a rarely seen genetic variation sometimes described as a partial albino. Few documented cases exist with only a painting of one found in Ōtorohanga in the 18th century and a specimen in the Canterbury Museum. The injured bird recovered and was introduced into a breeding programme.

== Ecology ==
=== Range ===
Various isolated and framented populations of North Island brown kiwi are found on North Island and adjacent islands of New Zealand. It is most abundant in Northland and is also sparsely distributed in the Coromandel Peninsula, Bay of Plenty, Gisborne to the northern Ruahine Range and from Tongariro to Taranaki. Stable populations are also found on Little Barrier Island, Kawau and Ponui Island. The species has also been successfully introduced to three pest-free offshore islands of Motukawanui, Motuora and Motutapu since 1991. Translocated populations also exist on various mainland sites. The population has likely declined by at least 90% since 1900 and continues to decline at the rate of 2.5% per annum in mainland populations due to predators, however, this is balanced by population increases in regions with absent to low number of predators. The extent of occurrence range is 157,000 km^{2} (61,000 sq mi), with a population of around 26,600 estimated in 2015, which was down from an estimated populations of 35,000 in 1996. A hybrid population of 2,000 is also found on Ponui Island. Estimates suggest that the population of North Island brown kiwi has suffered from a reduction of 30-49% across three generations (26 years).

=== Habitat ===
Historically, prior to human colonisation, New Zealand's native forests covered terrestrial land and provided the assumed primary habitat for all kiwi species, which thrived in this ecosystem.

In modern day New Zealand, North Island brown kiwi appear to generally prefer densely vegetated lowland and coastal New Zealand native forest (subtropical and temperate forests) as their population densities are highest in these habitats. However, due to widespread deforestation and destruction of these native forests post colonisation, the availability and abundance of these preferred habitats has significantly decreased. Although the characteristics of North Island brown kiwi, such as a low reproductive rate and longevity, suggest this species is accustomed to a stable environment, the North Island brown kiwi has been shown to be adaptive to an array of habitat types outside of its historical, ideal habitats. It can also be found utilising exotic pine forests, overgrown pasture, sand dunes, shrublands, scrub, regenerating forests and forest remnants. This variety in potential habitat usage has been suggested to be possible by the North Island brown kiwi selectively utilising small patches of favourable or ideal habitats amongst other habitat type patches. North Island brown kiwi appear to thrive in exotic forests similarly to native forests. Anecdotal evidence suggests that the population densities, body weights and productivity of North Island brown kiwi in exotic forests is comparable to those within New Zealand's native forests.

Although there is an acknowledged favourable habitat, the current primary driver of habitat usage in the North Island brown kiwi appears to be food and shelter site availability with reproduction also being a factor. Not in relation to favourable habitat availability within a given territory. For example, nesting sites of the North Island brown kiwi in a territory containing patches of different habitat types typically were found within or 25m near secondary succession vegetation and/or native vegetation. Kiwi chicks shortly after hatching can only walk short distances and therefore require adequate nearby habitats, which are selected for by nesting parental North Island brown kiwi.

=== Threats ===
The major threat to North Island brown kiwi comes from predators, such as dogs, cats, stoat (Mustela erminea) and ferret (Mustela furo). A single predator can significantly impact a population within a time period, such as when a single dog killed around 500 birds in a span of six weeks. Over 70 incidents of predations by dogs were recorded in Northland between 1990 and 1995. The smaller male of the species is at a greater risk of predation by ferrets. Juvenile kiwi of weights above 800g become too large for stoats. A study in 1996 found that 94% of chicks died before reaching breeding age in areas where mammalian pest control was not carried out.

Deforestation and clearance of habitats is also a major threat. However, due to ongoing conservation efforts, the rate of loss of native habitat has decreased rapidly and is thus not considered a major factor in population reductions. Avian diseases and novel pathogens brought on by introduced populations of other ratites to New Zealand are also deemed a threat.

== Behaviour ==
=== Foraging ===
Foraging at night

Kiwi species, such as the North Island brown kiwi, have been found to allocate the majority of their time to foraging, as compared to other behaviours such as vigilance, walking, socialising etc. Their diet primarily consists of invertebrate species, including spiders and worms, which make up 85–95% of their intake, with plant material comprising the remainder.

Over evolutionary history, the visual organs of Apteryx species have been greatly diminished, leading to an overall reduction in their visual field. In fact, Apteryx has the smallest visual field reported of any bird species that rely on non-visual cues for foraging purposes. It has been proposed that this adaptation arose due to their nocturnal, forest-floor foraging behaviour, where low light conditions render visual perception less critical. Under these conditions, a reduction in reliance of visual cues may increase overall fitness by lowering metabolic costs associated with maintaining visual functions and extracting visual information. This suggestion is further supported by the behaviour of other nocturnal, forest floor foraging species that similarly are unable to or do not rely on visual cues for foraging, suggesting convergent evolution across various orders, families and species.

Skull of a North Island brown kiwi. The beak is long, narrow and slightly curved downwards

Given the reduction in their visual senses, Apteryx species, including the North Island brown kiwi are required to utilise their additional senses, particularly remote touch and smell to find prey. Remote touch foraging is facilitated by the bill-tip sensory organ found at the end of kiwi species' long, narrow and slightly down curved beaks. The bill-tip organ consists of mechanoreceptors, such as Herbst corpuscles and terminal cell receptors, found within sensory pits in the bone of the beak tip. These mechanoreceptors are sensitive to the vibrations and pressure gradients soil dwelling invertebrates make underground, allowing kiwi to detect their prey without visual or auditory cues.

The North Island brown kiwi's most common form of foraging has been observed to be tapping and probing the ground substrate with their beaks. This form of foraging is thought to allow for either smell or tactile sensing of prey, with the North Island brown kiwi capable of switching between these sensory modalities depending on the available stimuli.

=== Courtship and reproduction ===
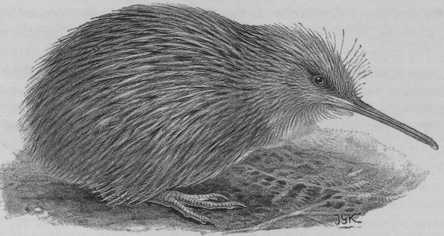
Illustration of chick

The North Island brown kiwi has been found to primarily engage in monogamous, long term pairings regardless of the sex ratio within a population. During courtship and the breeding period, individuals can be observed softly grunting while exhibiting bill to bill raised stretching behavioural displays, thought to reinforce established bonds between pairs and has been observed to occasionally occur before copulation. Additionally, prior to copulation, North Island brown kiwi pairs have also been observed to engage in mutual chasing, leaping, loud screeches and snorting.

Once a partnership has formed, the pair prepares their nest for the breeding season within their territory, a process that spans around a 2-month period. This preparation includes burrowing and lining the nests walls and floors with plant material such as fern fronds. Nest sites are typically located underground, within rock crevices or hollowed areas of tree trunks and roots.

After the nest is prepared, the female within the pair contributes her sole parental effort by laying significantly energetically expensive, large eggs. Female North Island brown kiwi can lay up to five eggs in a single clutch and up to seven eggs during a breeding season (multiple clutches), though a complete brood that can be properly incubated contains two eggs, which is the average amount of eggs produced by a female in a single clutch. Eggs are 12.5 cm × 7.8 cm (4.9 in × 3.1 in) in length and width and weigh 430 g (0.95 lb). Egg laying has been recorded in every month between June and November in a high-density population. Once the eggs are laid, the male within a pair solely provides incubation, starting from one to seven days post hatch and between 74 and 84 days in total. During incubation, male North Island brown kiwi develop a brood patch, where feathers are shed from the lower abdomen, which has been assumed to facilitate more direct contact for enhanced heat transfer, as observed in other kiwi species. The eggs are also regularly turned during incubation.

When males leave their nest for foraging, they often conceal the nest's entrance using surrounding plant material, dirt and plant litter. This has been proposed as an anti-predator mechanism against the New Zealand native weka bird species. It has also been proposed that this could be a technique utilised to control the amount of humidity within a nest. Generally, incubating males typically leave the nest to forage for roughly a five-hour period, half of the time spent by non-incubating individuals, suggesting a reduction in foraging time due to parental duties.

Once a chick hatches, it consumes the remaining shell and egg contents as these are highly nutritious. After hatching, chicks do not receive further parental care as they are born precocious fully-feathered and with near full senses and mobility. Chicks generally leave the nest within ten days of hatching and remain in their parent's territory, foraging and nesting independently, until they are large enough to establish their own territory. Research has indicated that more chicks hatch in reused nests than in previously unused burrows.

=== Vocalisations ===
Female song

Kiwi species possess unique vocalisations that, like those of other bird species, are proposed to serve in a variety of different social functions. The most common distinctive sound produced by the North Island brown kiwi is termed the "whistle call", which is performed solo or in a duet. Mates exclusively perform duets as a form of pair communication.

Generally, the vocalisations of the North Island brown kiwi are believed to play roles in territory defence, social communication and courtship purposes. It has been observed that call rates tend to increase during the breeding period and decrease during the incubation period. North Island brown kiwi vocalisation is suited for short-range calls to close-by individuals and territory neighbours.

There are notable differences between the two sexes' vocalisations. Male North Island brown kiwi calls produce high-pitched (≤36) multi-harmonic notes, whereas females typically emit low-frequency notes. These differences are attributed to differences in the structure and size of their vocal organs. Additionally, males have been observed to have a significantly higher call rate compared to females.

== Taxonomy ==
The North Island brown kiwi, or brown kiwi at the time, was first described as Apteryx australis by Abraham Dee Bartlett, in 1813, based on a specimen from Dusky Sound, South Island, New Zealand. This is a monotypic species.

The brown kiwi (then Apteryx australis) was originally thought to additionally include the rowi (Okarito kiwi) and the tokoeka species. However, through genetic testing in 1994, it was determined that the tokoeka was a separate, distinct taxon. Once the tokoeka was separated into its own species, it was given the name Apteryx australis, eventually leading to the official binomial name of Apteryx mantelli to describe the North Island brown kiwi. In 2003, more comprehensive genetic tests were performed and it was definitively determined that rowi was also a separate species and was later given the binomial name Apteryx rowi. The genome of Apteryx mantelli was sequenced in 2015.

A 2016 study conducted phylogenetic and population genetic analyses of the genus Apteryx. A Bayesian phylogeny using 1,710 base pairs of mtDNA for 203 individuals (including Holocene-aged fossil kiwi) showed that all five recognized species of kiwi are reciprocally monophyletic. The phylogeny also showed extensive differentiation between extant populations within A. australis and A. mantelli as well as fossil populations in A. australis, A. owenii and A. rowi. The researchers generated the following species tree of the five recognized species of kiwi in two clades (spotted and brown) with all divergence events having occurred within the last 8 million years.

- Apteryx (3.85 mya)
  - (0.55 mya)
    - Apteryx owenii
    - Apteryx maxima
  - (1.56 mya)
    - - (1.12 mya)
        - Apteryx mantelli
        - Apteryx rowi
    - Apteryx australis

== Conservation ==
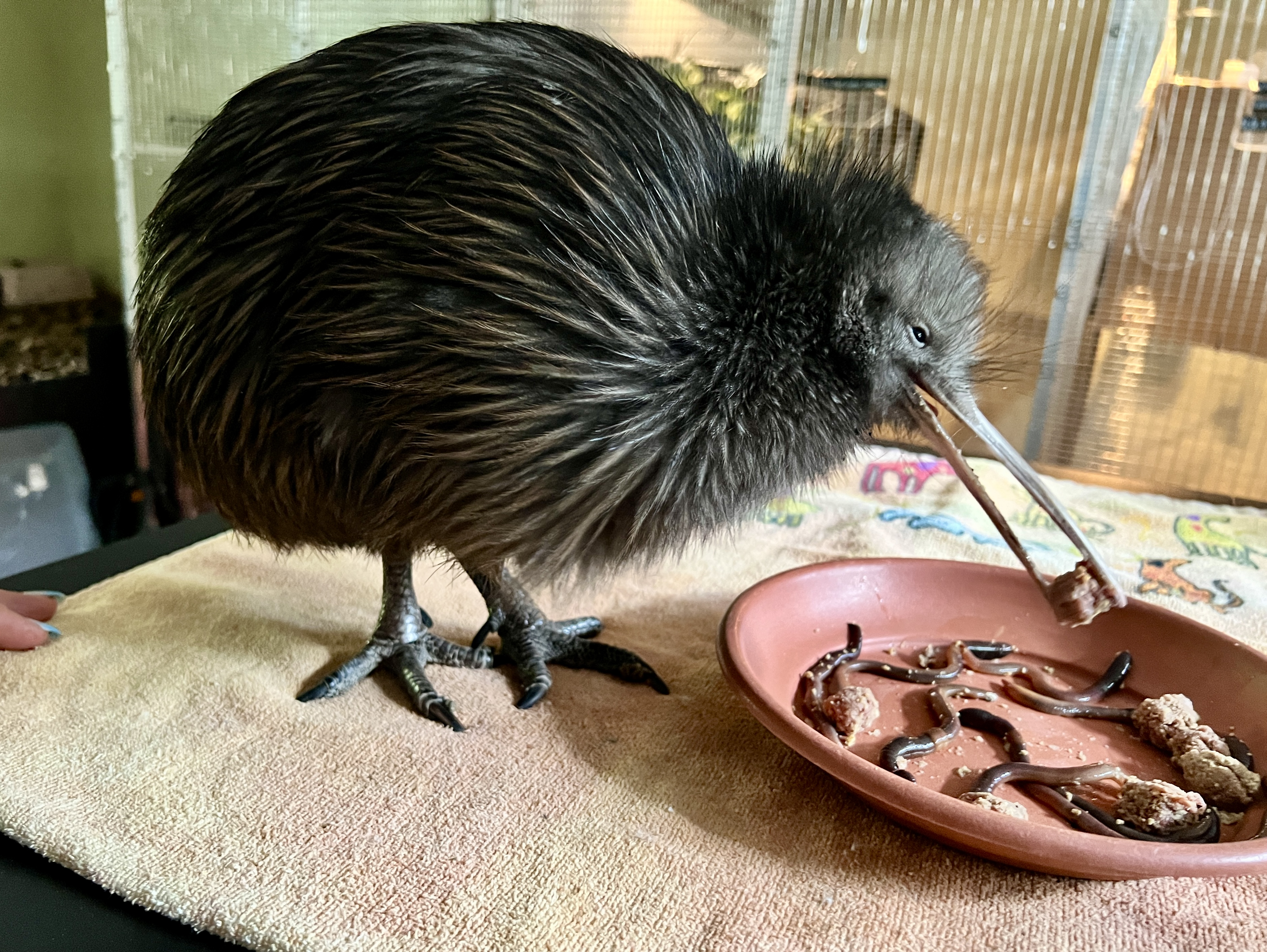
"Paora", the first north island brown kiwi born in U.S

The North Island brown kiwi was first assessed to be Endangered by the IUCN Red List in 2014, it was later assessed to be Vulnerable in 2017. In 1996, there were around 35,000 North Island brown kiwi. In 2006, there were 20,000.

Nationwide studies show that on average only 5% of kiwi chicks survive to adulthood. However, in areas under active pest management, survival rates for North Island brown kiwi can be far higher. For example, prior to a joint 1080 poison operation undertaken by Department of Conservation and the Animal Health Board in Tongariro forest in 2006, 32 kiwi chicks were radio-tagged, of which 18 survived to adulthood. Due to ongoing pest control, the adult kiwi population at Tongariro has almost doubled since 1998. In 2006, kiwi were released into Remutaka Forest Park by the Remutaka Conservation Trusts. As of 2024, the population has reached 300 individuals in the park and surrounding areas, extending to Upper Hutt and Whitemans Valley.

Paora (Māori pronunciation: [ˈpaɔɾa]; hatched 9 April 2019) is a North Island brown kiwi that was the first kiwi to be born in the U.S. state of Florida, after his parents were loaned from New Zealand, to the Smithsonian National Zoo. He currently resides at Zoo Miami and gained widespread attention in May 2023 after social media videos showing him being mistreated went viral.

In 2022, eleven North Island brown kiwi were released on the south coast of Wellington after a 100 year absence. Fifty more kiwi were released into the hills of Wellington in May 2023.
