= Matauri Bay =

Locality in Far North District, Northland Region, New Zealand

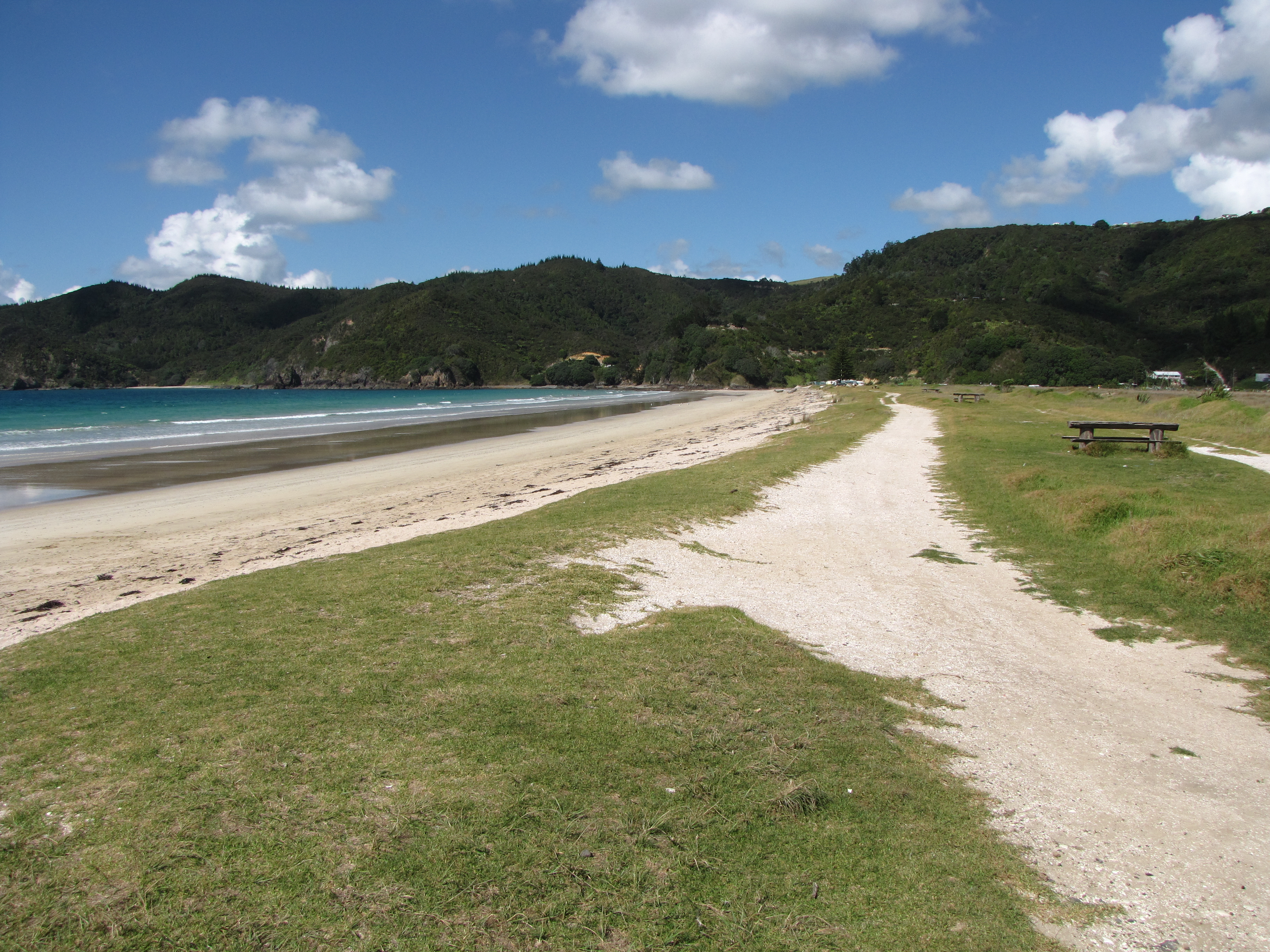
- Matauri Bay
- Interactive map of Matauri Bay
- Coordinates: 35°02′S 173°54′E
- Country: New Zealand
- Region: Northland Region
- District: Far North District
- Ward: Bay of Islands/Whangaroa
- Community: Bay of Islands-Whangaroa
- Subdivision: Whangaroa
- Electorates: Northland; Te Tai Tokerau

Government
  - Territorial Authority: Far North District Council
  - Regional council: Northland Regional Council
  - Mayor of Far North: Moko Tepania
  - Northland MP: Grant McCallum
  - Te Tai Tokerau MP: Mariameno Kapa-Kingi

Area
  - Total: 3.54 km^{2} (1.37 sq mi)

Population (June 2025)
  - Total: 310
  - Density: 88/km^{2} (230/sq mi)

Matauri Bay (Māori: Mātauri) is a bay in New Zealand, situated 30 km north of Kerikeri, in Whangaroa county, just north of the Bay of Islands. It has over a kilometre of white sand and crystal clear water, making it a popular summer destinations for surfers, divers, fishers and holidaymakers.

== History and culture ==
=== Early history ===
Some of the first Polynesian navigators to New Zealand landed at Matauri Bay. It was a site of early Māori contact with Europeans, such as with the missionary Samuel Marsden in 1814.

=== Rainbow Warrior ===
The Rainbow Warrior was given a final resting place near Matauri Bay, at the Cavalli Islands. It has become a living reef, attracting marine life and recreational divers.

The idea was first proposed by the New Zealand Underwater Association. It seemed a fitting end for a ship that had spent its time protecting the marine environment.

It was towed north with a patched hull on 2 December 1987. Ten days later, a crowd of well-wishers looked on as it was given a traditional Māori burial. Now home to a complex ecosystem, the Rainbow Warrior has become a popular dive destination. The local Māori community maintains its guardianship and conservation. In a few years, the Rainbow Warrior became an integral part of the environment it helped protect.

=== Marae ===
The Matauri Bay area has a marae. Mātauri or Te Tāpui Marae and Ngāpuhi meeting house is a meeting place of the Ngāpuhi hapū of Ngāti Kura and Ngāti Miru, and the Ngāpuhi / Ngāti Kahu ki Whaingaroa hapū of Ngāti Kura.

== Demographics ==
Statistics New Zealand describes Matauri Bay as a rural settlement. It covers 3.54 km^{2} (1.37 sq mi) and had an estimated population of 310 as of June 2025, with a population density of 88 people per km^{2}. Matauri Bay is part of the larger Whakarara statistical area]].

Historical population for Matauri Bay
| Year | Pop. | ±% p.a. |
|---|---|---|
| 2013 | 213 | — |
| 2018 | 309 | +7.72% |
| 2023 | 303 | −0.39% |

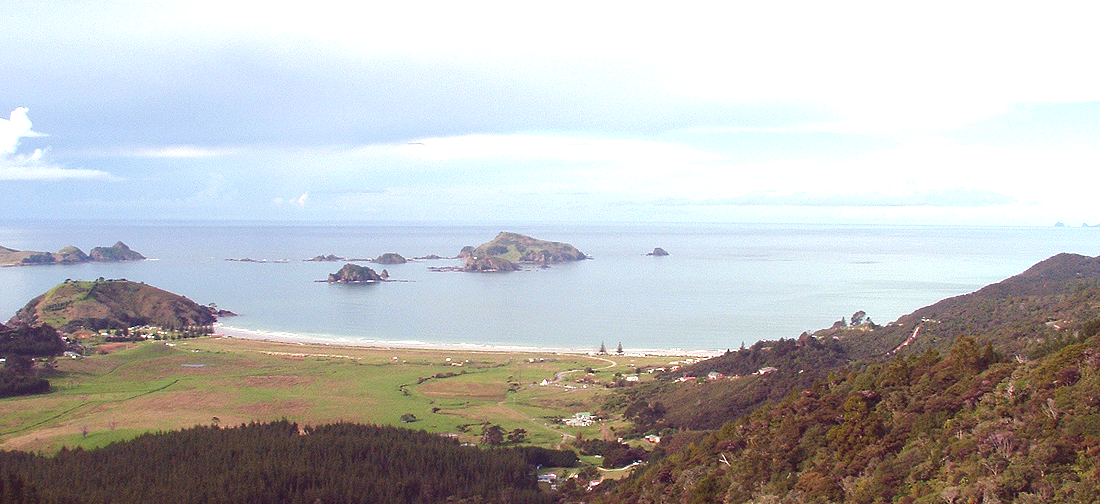
Panorama of Matauri Bay. The Cavalli Islands are further to the left.

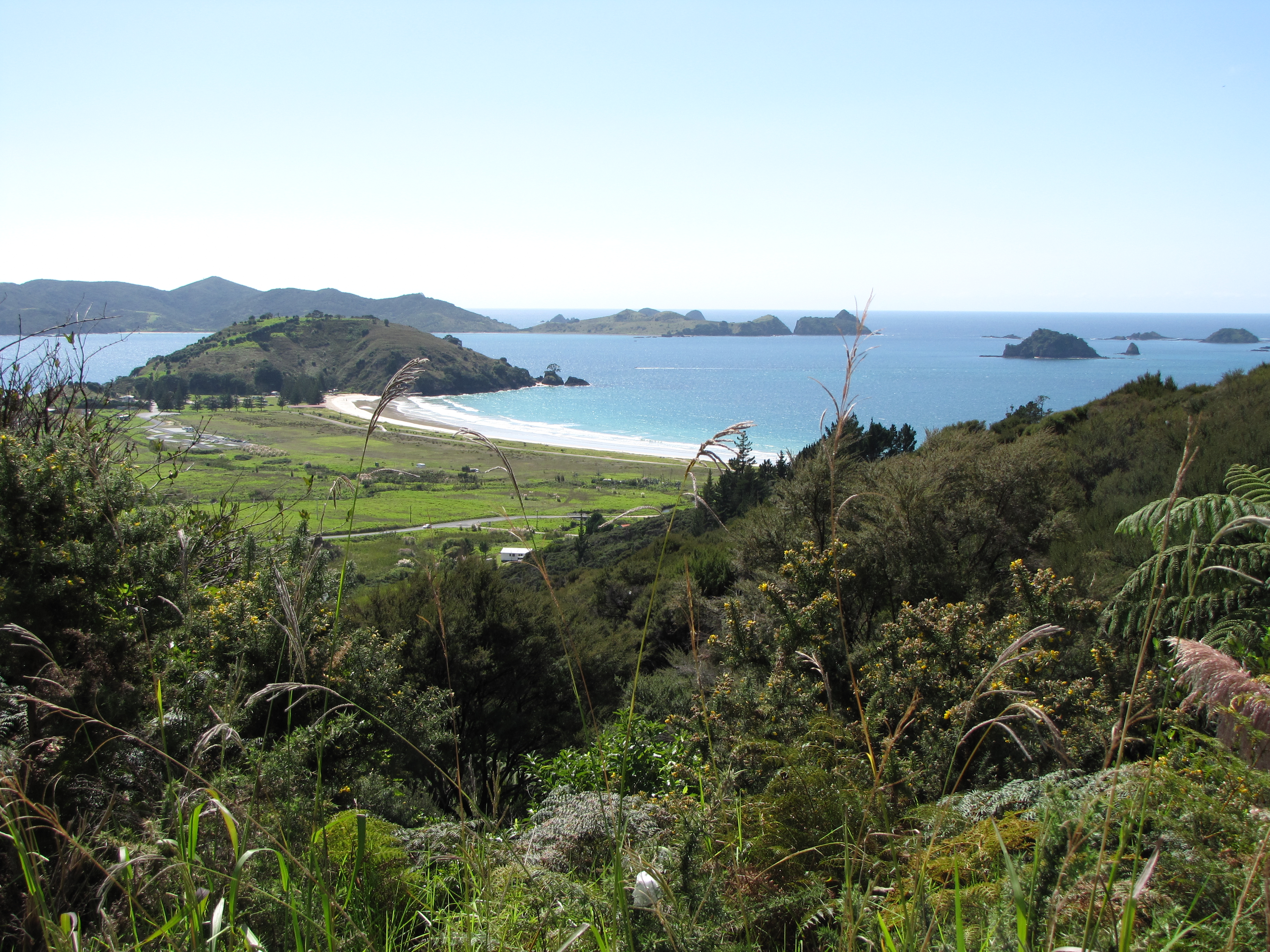
View over the bay

Matauri Bay had a population of 303 in the 2023 New Zealand census, a decrease of 6 people (−1.9%) since the 2018 census, and an increase of 90 people (42.3%) since the 2013 census. There were 144 males and 159 females in 90 dwellings. 3.0% of people identified as LGBTIQ+. The median age was 34.4 years (compared with 38.1 years nationally). There were 72 people (23.8%) aged under 15 years, 63 (20.8%) aged 15 to 29, 123 (40.6%) aged 30 to 64, and 42 (13.9%) aged 65 or older.

People could identify as more than one ethnicity. The results were 36.6% European (Pākehā), 85.1% Māori, 4.0% Pasifika, and 1.0% Asian. English was spoken by 94.1%, Māori language by 34.7%, and other languages by 3.0%. No language could be spoken by 2.0% (e.g. too young to talk). The percentage of people born overseas was 6.9, compared with 28.8% nationally.

Religious affiliations were 29.7% Christian, 14.9% Māori religious beliefs, and 1.0% other religions. People who answered that they had no religion were 48.5%, and 7.9% of people did not answer the census question.

Of those at least 15 years old, 30 (13.0%) people had a bachelor's or higher degree, 117 (50.6%) had a post-high school certificate or diploma, and 78 (33.8%) people exclusively held high school qualifications. The median income was $29,200, compared with $41,500 nationally. 9 people (3.9%) earned over $100,000 compared to 12.1% nationally. The employment status of those at least 15 was that 96 (41.6%) people were employed full-time, 27 (11.7%) were part-time, and 12 (5.2%) were unemployed.

=== Whakarara statistical area ===
Whakarara statistical area covers the area east of Whangaroa Harbour. It has an area of 169.54 km^{2} (65.46 sq mi) and had an estimated population of 1,390 as of June 2025, with a population density of 8.2 people per km^{2}.

Historical population for Whakarara
| Year | Pop. | ±% p.a. |
|---|---|---|
| 2006 | 1,104 | — |
| 2013 | 1,026 | −1.04% |
| 2018 | 1,344 | +5.55% |
| 2023 | 1,350 | +0.09% |

Whakarara had a population of 1,350 in the 2023 New Zealand census, an increase of 6 people (0.4%) since the 2018 census, and an increase of 324 people (31.6%) since the 2013 census. There were 675 males, 675 females and 3 people of other genders in 513 dwellings. 1.6% of people identified as LGBTIQ+. The median age was 48.8 years (compared with 38.1 years nationally). There were 228 people (16.9%) aged under 15 years, 180 (13.3%) aged 15 to 29, 597 (44.2%) aged 30 to 64, and 348 (25.8%) aged 65 or older.

People could identify as more than one ethnicity. The results were 62.0% European (Pākehā); 56.0% Māori; 3.8% Pasifika; 1.6% Asian; 0.7% Middle Eastern, Latin American and African New Zealanders (MELAA); and 2.0% other, which includes people giving their ethnicity as "New Zealander". English was spoken by 96.9%, Māori language by 18.2%, Samoan by 0.4% and other languages by 4.4%. No language could be spoken by 1.6% (e.g. too young to talk). The percentage of people born overseas was 12.2, compared with 28.8% nationally.

Religious affiliations were 31.6% Christian, 0.2% Hindu, 9.3% Māori religious beliefs, 0.9% Buddhist, 0.4% New Age, and 0.9% other religions. People who answered that they had no religion were 50.4%, and 7.1% of people did not answer the census question.

Of those at least 15 years old, 132 (11.8%) people had a bachelor's or higher degree, 636 (56.7%) had a post-high school certificate or diploma, and 330 (29.4%) people exclusively held high school qualifications. The median income was $28,300, compared with $41,500 nationally. 54 people (4.8%) earned over $100,000 compared to 12.1% nationally. The employment status of those at least 15 was that 435 (38.8%) people were employed full-time, 150 (13.4%) were part-time, and 39 (3.5%) were unemployed.

== Education ==
Matauri Bay School is a contributing primary (years 1-6) school with a roll of 43 students as of July 2026. It opened in 1954.

Te Kura Kaupapa Māori o Whangaroa is a composite (years 1-13) school with a roll of 29 students as of July 2026. It is a Kura Kaupapa Māori school which teaches fully in the Māori language.

Both schools are coeducational.

A Māori school was established at Te Ngaere in 1876, but student numbers fluctuated as local people moved to seek an income on the gumfields. In 1890, attendance at the school ceased, and the building was dragged to the top of the hill by a bullock team to make it more accessible. Changing its name to Whakarara School, it remained open until Matauri Bay School replaced it.

== Notes ==
Media related to Matauri Bay at Wikimedia Commons
