= Kaeo River =

Coordinates: 35°05′S 173°46′E

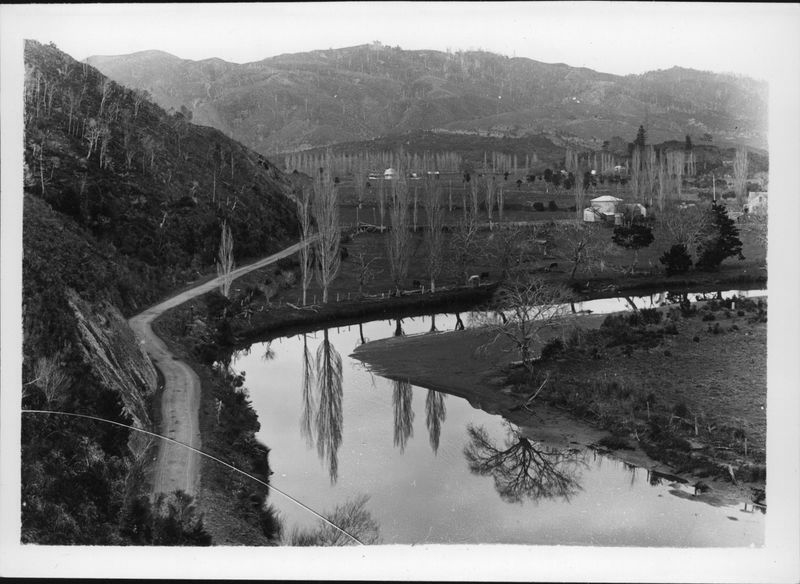
- Kaeo seen in 1902

Location
- Country: New Zealand

Physical characteristics
- Mouth
  - location: Whangaroa Harbour
- Length: 18 km (11 mi)

The Kaeo River is a river of the far north of New Zealand's North Island. It flows through the north of the North Auckland Peninsula, reaching the sea at the Whangaroa Harbour. The small town of Kaeo sits on its banks, 5 kilometres (3 mi) from the river's mouth.

== See also ==
- List of rivers of New Zealand
