= Warren Hastings (1789 ship) =

History

Great Britain
- Name: Warren Hastings
- Owner: 1789:Fairlie & Co.; 1805:J. Short
- Builder: George Gillet, Calcutta, or George Gillet and David Robertson
- Launched: November 1789, or 11 February 1789
- Renamed: Speke (1805)
- Fate: 25 August 1830 register cancelled, demolition being completed

General characteristics
- Tons burthen: 400, or 439, or 450, or 456, or 459, or 473, or 47382/94 (bm)
- Length: 111 ft 10 in (34.1 m) (overall}
- Beam: 31 ft 2 in (9.5 m)
- Propulsion: Sail
- Armament: 1797:8 × 4-pounder guns; 1809:14 × 9-pounder guns

Warren Hastings was built in 1789 at Calcutta, India. Her registry was transferred to Great Britain in 1796. In 1805 she was sold and her new owners renamed her Speke. She made three voyages transporting convicts from Britain to New South Wales. After her first convict voyage she engaged in whaling.

== Career ==
The cost of Warren Hasting's (Speke's) hull, coppered, and with masts and yard, was 55,000 Sicca rupees.

Warren Hastings was among the country ships reported at Canton in 1789.

On 7 September 1796 Warren Hastings was admitted to the Registry in Great Britain. She entered Lloyd's Register in 1796 with master W. Fleming, and owner Fairlie & Co.

| Year | Master | Owner | Trade | Source |
|---|---|---|---|---|
| 1799 | Fleming | W. Fairlie & Co. | London-India | Lloyd's List |
| 1800 | Fleming | W. Lennox | London | Register of Shipping |
| 1801 | Fleming | W. Lennox | London | Register of Shipping |

Lloyd's Register continues to list Warren Hastings from 1799 with unchanged information. However, in 1801, the Register of Shipping shows a change of ownership to W. Lennox in 1801, and no longer lists her in 1802. (Note: One source lists Warren Hastings among vessels "Lost, burnt, or taken", but gives no year. There is no other evidence to support the report. In 1805 the French captured a different Warren Hastings, raising the possibility of a confusion of names.)

The government engaged Warren Hastings as a transport to support General Sir David Baird's expedition to the Red Sea, which in turn had the objective of supporting General Sir Ralph Abercrombie at the battle of Alexandria.

The New Oriental Register... for 1802 lists Warren Hastings with Benjamin Blake as owner and master.

In 1805 she was sold and her new owners renamed her Speke.

Speke entered Lloyd's Register in 1809 (published in 1808) with Hingston, master, and Wilson & Co., owner. Her trade was London—Botany Bay. Under the command of John Hingston, Speke sailed from Falmouth, England, on 18 May 1808 and arrived at Port Jackson on 16 November 1808. She embarked 99 female convicts, two of whom died on the voyage.

Speke sailed on 12 January 1809 from Port Jackson to undertake whaling or sealing.

During 1809 she was whale hunting at the Derwent River.

In March 1810, half-a-dozen whalers gathered in Bay of Islands and launched a retributionary attack on the Maori after the Boyd massacre. The whalers killed an estimated 16 to 60 Maori and burnt some structures. One sailor was accidentally killed. The vessels involved in the attack were Atalanta, Inspector, New Zealander, Perseverance, Speke, and Spring Grove.

Speke was at the Bay of Islands in February 1810. In March, upon hearing of the story of the Boyd massacre, a party of men from Speke, Inspector, Diana, Atalanta, and Perseveance joined in an attack on Te Pahi's pa on Te Puna island, killing approximately 60 Māori. Te Pahi was wounded and died a few weeks later.

Speke was at Rio in July as she returned from the South Seas. Speke returned to Britain on 23 October. She returned with more than 30 tons of sperm oil and 150 tons of black oil.

The Register of Shipping for 1820 shows Speke with Quinton, master, J. Short, owner, and trade London−India. Lloyd's Register for 1821 shows Speke with M'Pherson, master, T. Ward, owner, and trade London—Botany Bay.

On her second voyage carrying convicts Speke was under the command of Peter McPherson. Speke sailed from England on 22 December 1820 and arrived at Port Jackson on 18 May 1821. She embarked 156 male convicts, two of whom died on the voyage. The convicts included the last prisoners from Scotland's Radical War. Speke's passengers included Hongi Hika and Waikato (two Māori chiefs), and the missionary Thomas Kendall, all three of whom were returning to New Zealand.

Both Lloyd's Register and the Register of Shipping for 1827 show Speke's master as Harrison and her owner as T. Ward or J. Ward. However, Lloyd's Register shows her trade as London transport while the Register of Shipping shows it as London—New South Wales.

On her third voyage carrying convicts Speke was under the command of Captain Robert Harrison. She left Sheerness on 8 August 1826 and arrived at Port Jackson on 26 November. She embarked 156 male convicts, none of whom died on the voyage.

== Fate ==
Phipps reported that her owners sold Speke to the Portuguese. However, he did not specify a year. Hackman reported that Speke was broken up in 1830. Neither Lloyd's Register nor the Register of Shipping listed Speke in 1831.
