= Whangaroa =

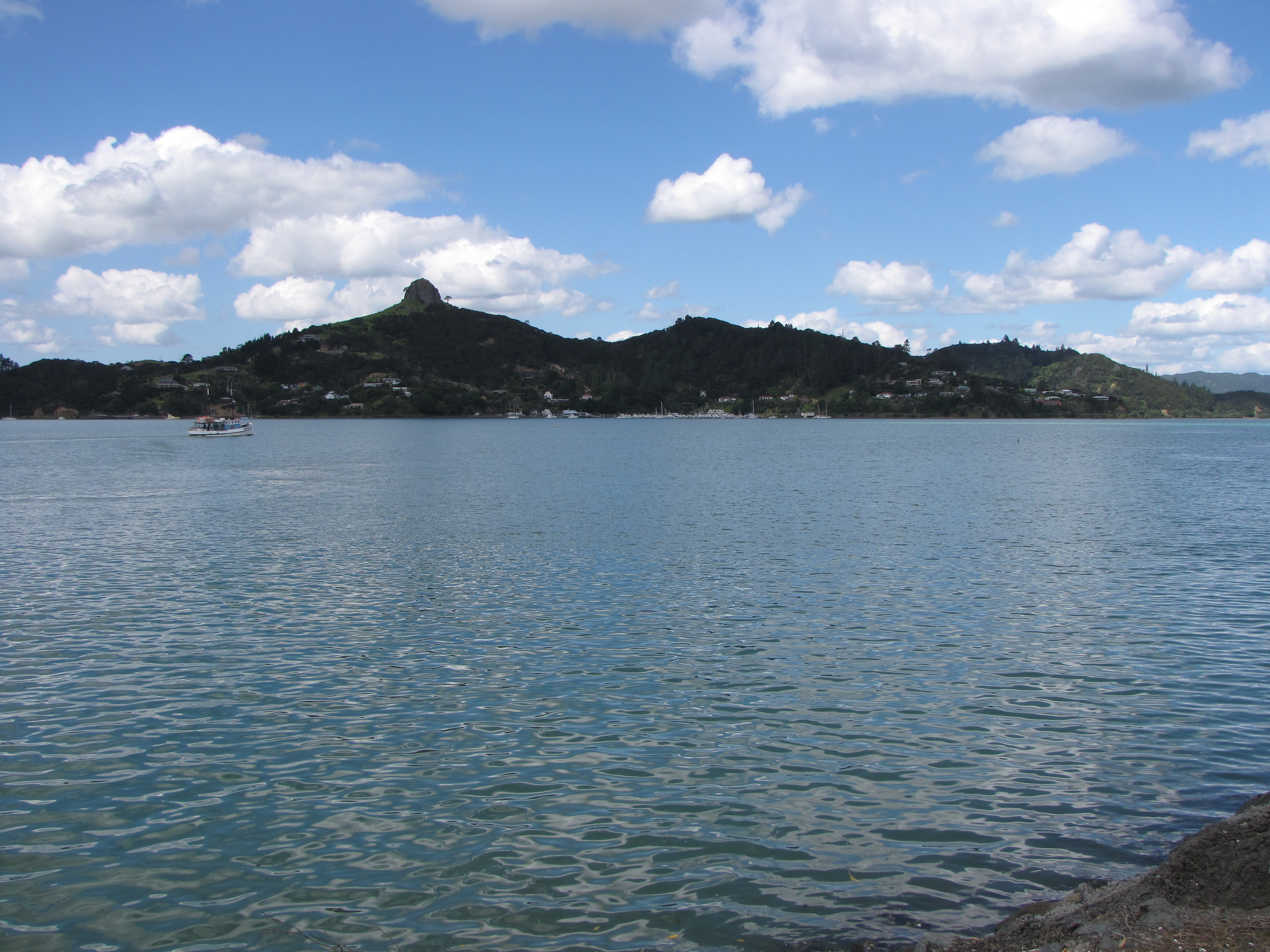
- Whangaroa
- Interactive map of Whangaroa
- Coordinates: 35°3′8″S 173°44′31″E
- Country: New Zealand
- Region: Northland Region
- District: Far North District
- Ward: Bay of Islands/Whangaroa
- Community: Bay of Islands-Whangaroa
- Subdivision: Whangaroa
- Electorates: Northland; Te Tai Tokerau

Government
  - Territorial Authority: Far North District Council
  - Regional council: Northland Regional Council
  - Mayor of Far North: Moko Tepania
  - Northland MP: Grant McCallum
  - Te Tai Tokerau MP: Mariameno Kapa-Kingi

Area
  - Total: 1.24 km^{2} (0.48 sq mi)

Population (June 2025)
  - Total: 140
  - Density: 110/km^{2} (290/sq mi)

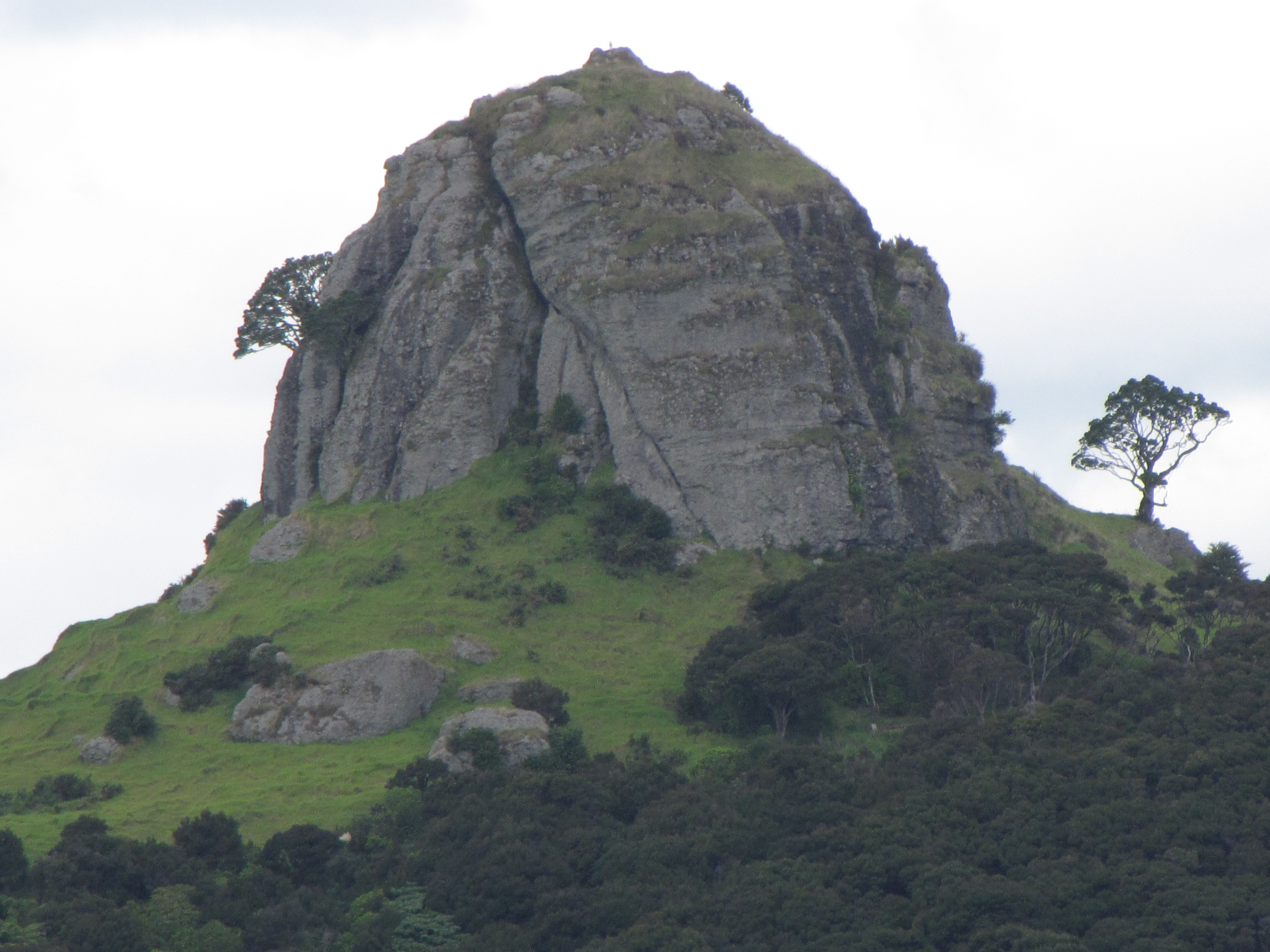
The St Paul volcanic plug (Māori name Ohakiri) that rises over the settlement of Whangaroa

Whangaroa, also known as Whangaroa Village to distinguish it from the larger area of the former Whangaroa County, is a settlement on Whangaroa Harbour in the Far North District of New Zealand. It is 8 km north-west of Kaeo and 35 km north-west of Kerikeri. The harbour is almost landlocked and is popular both as a fishing spot in its own right and as a base for deep-sea fishing.

== History ==
The harbour was the scene of one of the most notorious incidents in early New Zealand history, the Boyd massacre. In December 1809 almost all the crew and 70 passengers were killed as utu (revenge) for the mistreatment of Te Ara, the son of a Ngāti Uru chief, who had been in the crew of the ship. Several days later the ship was burnt out after gunpowder was accidentally ignited. Relics of the Boyd are now in a local museum.

On 16 July 1824 on a voyage to Sydney from Tahiti, the crew and passengers of the colonial schooner Endeavour (Capt John Dibbs) stopped in Whangaroa Harbour. An altercation with the local Māori Ngāti Pou hapū (subtribe) of the Ngā Puhi iwi resulted in an incident where Maori warriors took control of the Endeavour and menaced the crew. The situation was defused by the timely arrival of the Ngāti Uru chief Te Ara, of Boyd fame.

In February 1827, the famous Ngā Puhi chief Hongi Hika was engaged in warfare against the tribes of Whangaroa. Acting contrary to the orders of Hongi Hika, some of his warriors plundered and burnt Wesleydale, the Wesleyan mission that had been established in June 1823 at Kaeo, nine kilometres from Whangaroa. The missionaries, Rev Turner and his wife and three children, together with Rev. Messrs, Hobbs and Stack, and Mr Wade and wife, were 'compelled to flee from Whangarooa (sic) for their lives'. They were conveyed by ship to Sydney, NSW. During a skirmish Hongi Hika was shot in the chest by one of his warriors. On 6 March 1828 Hongi Hika died at Whangaroa. There is no actual evidence that Hongi himself plundered the mission; he was busily pursuing the enemy and being wounded. Nor is there any direct evidence to implicate anybody else An alternate idea was put forward by William Williams of the CMS. " It appears beyond doubt, though our Wesleyan Friends are loath to believe it, that it was their own chief, Tepui, was the instigator of the whole business". The local Ngatiuru had made the land available to the mission. For years the missionaries had lived amongst them and grown prosperous while the tribe still ate fern root. There was no prospect of the missionaries moving on and no prospect of them becoming acceptable neighbours. They had not joined the tribe. They had set up their own tribe which was steadily wearing down the authority of the Ngatiuru leadership.

By the latter 19th century, the Whangaroa Harbour had become an important location for the kauri gum digging trade.

== Demographics ==
Statistics New Zealand describes Whangaroa as a rural settlement. It covers 1.24 km^{2} (0.48 sq mi) and had an estimated population of 140 as of June 2025, with a population density of 113 people per km^{2}. Whangaroa is part of the larger Whakarara statistical area.

Historical population
Year	Pop.	±% p.a.
2006	105	—
2013	102	−0.41%
2018	144	+7.14%
2023	141	−0.42%

Whangaroa had a population of 141 in the 2023 New Zealand census, a decrease of 3 people (−2.1%) since the 2018 census, and an increase of 39 people (38.2%) since the 2013 census. There were 75 males and 66 females in 75 dwellings. The median age was 65.3 years (compared with 38.1 years nationally). There were 6 people (4.3%) aged under 15 years, 6 (4.3%) aged 15 to 29, 54 (38.3%) aged 30 to 64, and 72 (51.1%) aged 65 or older.

People could identify as more than one ethnicity. The results were 89.4% European (Pākehā); 10.6% Māori; 6.4% Pasifika; 2.1% Asian; 2.1% Middle Eastern, Latin American and African New Zealanders (MELAA); and 4.3% other, which includes people giving their ethnicity as "New Zealander". English was spoken by 97.9%, Māori language by 4.3%, and other languages by 8.5%. No language could be spoken by 2.1% (e.g. too young to talk). The percentage of people born overseas was 19.1, compared with 28.8% nationally.

Religious affiliations were 29.8% Christian, 2.1% Hindu, 2.1% Buddhist, and 2.1% other religions. People who answered that they had no religion were 57.4%, and 6.4% of people did not answer the census question.

Of those at least 15 years old, 24 (17.8%) people had a bachelor's or higher degree, 81 (60.0%) had a post-high school certificate or diploma, and 33 (24.4%) people exclusively held high school qualifications. The median income was $26,200, compared with $41,500 nationally. 9 people (6.7%) earned over $100,000 compared to 12.1% nationally. The employment status of those at least 15 was that 27 (20.0%) people were employed full-time, 15 (11.1%) were part-time, and 3 (2.2%) were unemployed.
