= Kaeo =

Kaeo Kāeo (Māori)
- Motto(s): Small town, big spirit
- Interactive map of Kaeo
- Coordinates: 35°6′S 173°47′E
- Country: New Zealand
- Region: Northland Region
- District: Far North District
- Ward: Bay of Islands-Whangaroa
- Community: Bay of Islands-Whangaroa
- Subdivision: Whangaroa
- Electorates: Northland; Te Tai Tokerau

Government
  - Territorial Authority: Far North District Council
  - Regional council: Northland Regional Council
  - Mayor of Far North: Moko Tepania
  - Northland MP: Grant McCallum
  - Te Tai Tokerau MP: TBD

Area
  - Total: 1.39 km^{2} (0.54 sq mi)

Population (June 2025)
  - Total: 260
  - Density: 190/km^{2} (480/sq mi)
- Postcode: 0478

Kaeo (Māori: Kāeo) is a township in the Far North District of New Zealand, located some 22 km (14 mi) northwest of Kerikeri. The town's name comes from the Māori-language name of the New Zealand freshwater mussel, which is found in nearby rivers.

Sanfords Fishery factory, one of the main employers in Kaeo, closed in December 2011.

A new bridge on State Highway 10 across the Kaio River was opened in February 2024 to reduce queuing and improve traffic safety.

== History and culture ==
=== Pre-European settlement ===
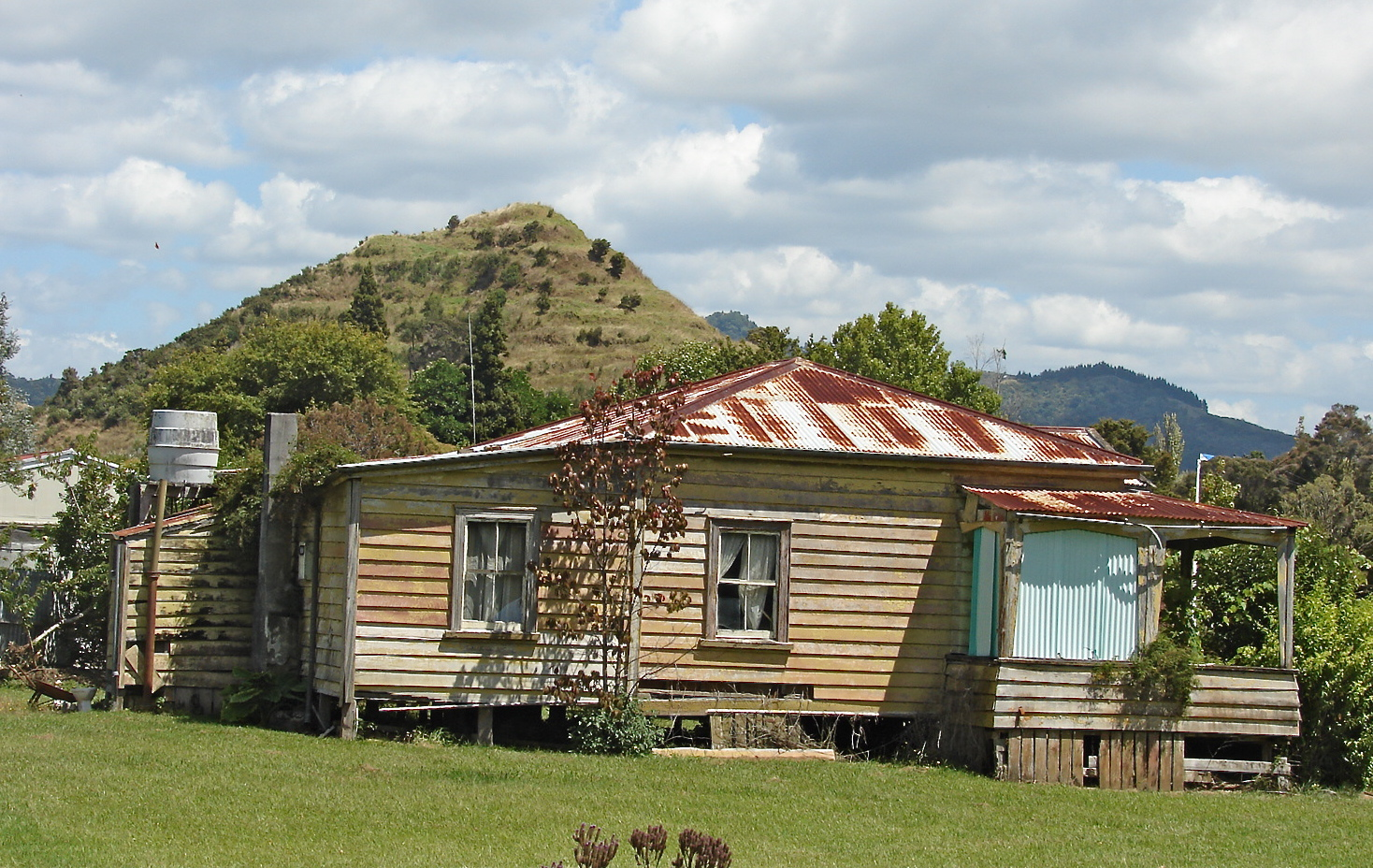
Pā site Pohue-nui of the Ngati Uru tribe. As seen behind an old house from the east, near SH 10, in February 2013.

Kaeo used to be a fortified village pā of the Ngati Uru sub-tribe. This tribe arrived in the Whangaroa Harbour as late as 1770–1775, having been driven out of the Rawhiti area of the Bay of Islands, after killing and eating Captain Marion du Fresne and his crew.

=== European settlement ===
Wesleydale, the first Wesleyan Methodist mission in New Zealand, was established by Samuel Leigh and William White at Kaeo in June 1823, then abandoned in January 1827 after it was sacked by local Māori. A memorial cairn marks the site of the mission adjacent to the cemetery on the south side of the Kaeo River.

=== Flooding ===
Kaeo is built on the flood plain of the Kaeo River and has experienced destructive flooding. It came to national attention in 2007 when it took the brunt of three major floods within the space of a few months - in February, March and July. Water flooded homes and shops and destroyed the primary school's pool complex. The local rugby clubrooms also suffered, and the club received support from the whole country as it raised funds to lift the clubrooms off the ground to minimise the risk of damage from further flooding.

Landslips, fallen power lines, and road closures resulted from heavy rain in February 2008. The Northland Regional Council scheduled flood-protection work for 2008, but in 2011 was still waiting on various consents. Floods occurred as a result of Cyclone Wilma in January 2011, and 70 people had to be evacuated from Kaeo.

In November 2025, the national water regulator Taumata Arowai took over Kāeo's drinking water supply from private contractor, Wai Care Environmental Consultants, and ordered the Far North District Council to operate it. The town had been under a boil water notice for the past ten years and lacked running water.

== Notable buildings ==
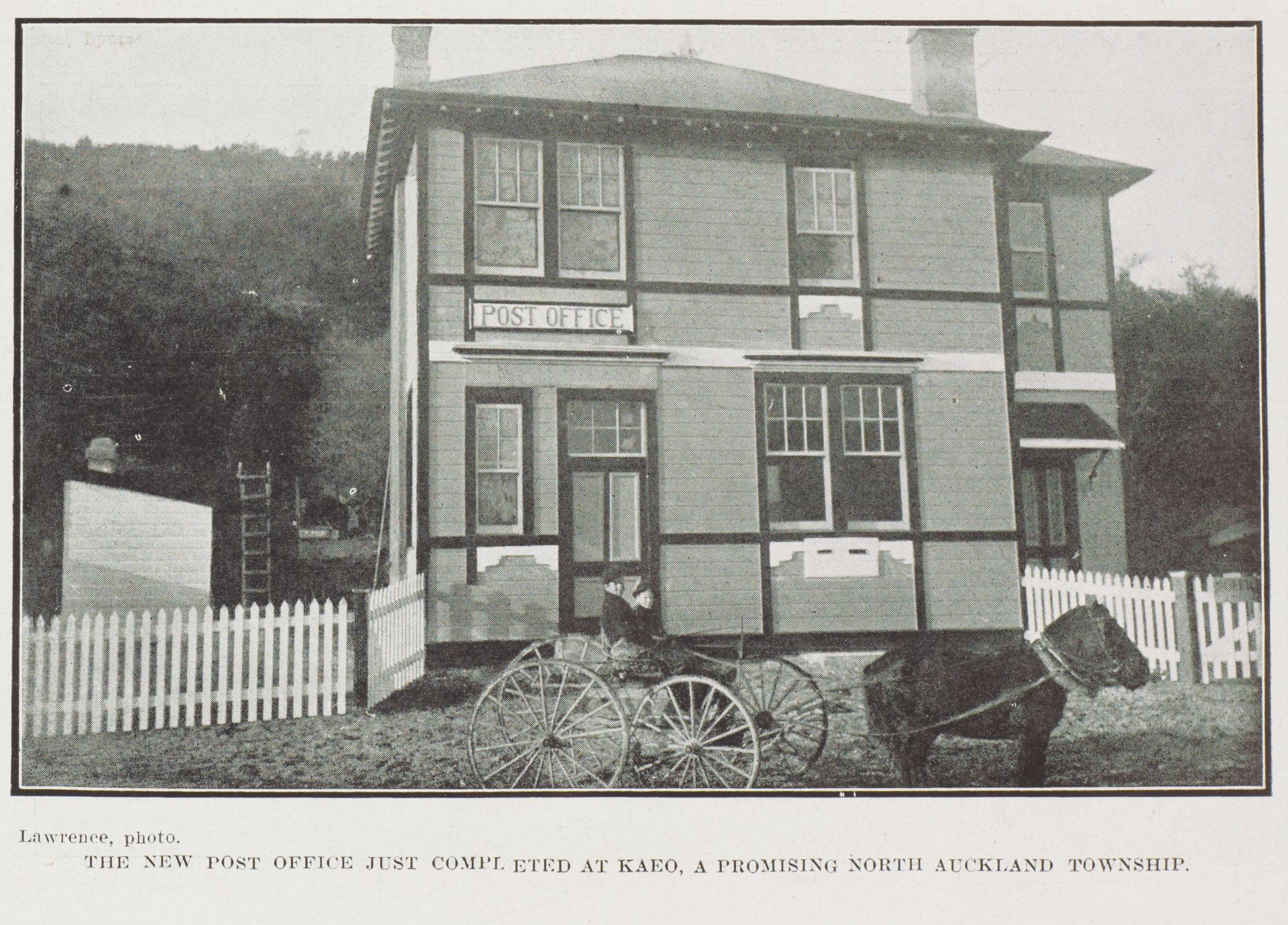
Kaeo Post Office shortly after opening

The Kaeo Post Office is a wooden Edwardian building constructed in 1912. The building served many additional functions until it closed in May 1989 following the Fourth Labour Government's economic reforms. It was refurbished in 2012 and as of 2020 operates as a community centre and library.

=== Marae ===
The Kaeo area has two marae affiliated with multiple iwi:

- Waihapa Marae and Te Tai Tokerau meeting house are affiliated with the Ngāti Kahu ki Whangaroa hapū of Riwhi and Te Pania, and the Ngāpuhi / Ngāti Kahu ki Whaingaroa hapū of Ngāti Rangimatamomoe and Whānau Pani. In October 2020, the Government committed $180,904 from the Provincial Growth Fund to upgrade Waihapa Marae, creating 12 jobs.

There are six marae affiliated with Ngāpuhi / Ngāti Kahu ki Whaingaroa hapū:

- Mangaiti Marae and Tau te Rangimarie meeting house are affiliated with Ngāti Pākahi and Ngāti Uru.
- Pupuke Marae and Te Huia meeting house are affiliated with Ngāti Pākahi, Ngāti Uru and Whānau Pani.
- Tahawai Marae and Te Awaroa meeting house are affiliated with Tahaawai.
- Te Pātūnga Marae and Te Watea meeting house are affiliated with Ngāti Pākahi, Ngāti Uru, Te Aeto and Whānau Pani.
- Whakaari Marae is affiliated with Ngāti Kawau.

== Demographics ==
Statistics New Zealand describes Kāeo as a rural settlement. It covers 1.39 km^{2} (0.54 sq mi) and had an estimated population of 260 as of June 2025, with a population density of 187 people per km^{2}. The settlement is part of the larger Kaeo statistical area.

Historical population for Kāeo settlement
Year	Pop.	±% p.a.
2006	171	—
2013	180	+0.74%
2018	228	+4.84%
2023	249	+1.78%

Kāeo had a population of 249 in the 2023 New Zealand census, an increase of 21 people (9.2%) since the 2018 census, and an increase of 69 people (38.3%) since the 2013 census. There were 135 males and 114 females in 84 dwellings. 1.2% of people identified as LGBTIQ+. The median age was 32.9 years (compared with 38.1 years nationally). There were 72 people (28.9%) aged under 15 years, 36 (14.5%) aged 15 to 29, 105 (42.2%) aged 30 to 64, and 36 (14.5%) aged 65 or older.

People could identify as more than one ethnicity. The results were 50.6% European (Pākehā), 73.5% Māori, 9.6% Pasifika, and 1.2% Asian. English was spoken by 95.2%, Māori language by 19.3%, and other languages by 1.2%. No language could be spoken by 2.4% (e.g. too young to talk). The percentage of people born overseas was 6.0, compared with 28.8% nationally.

Religious affiliations were 20.5% Christian and 14.5% Māori religious beliefs. People who answered that they had no religion were 56.6%, and 7.2% of people did not answer the census question.

Of those at least 15 years old, 9 (5.1%) people had a bachelor's or higher degree, 105 (59.3%) had a post-high school certificate or diploma, and 60 (33.9%) people exclusively held high school qualifications. The median income was $29,400, compared with $41,500 nationally. 6 people (3.4%) earned over $100,000 compared to 12.1% nationally. The employment status of those at least 15 was that 72 (40.7%) people were employed full-time, 24 (13.6%) were part-time, and 9 (5.1%) were unemployed.

=== Kāeo statistical area ===
Kāeo statistical area covers 255.56 km^{2} (98.67 sq mi) and had an estimated population of 1,340 as of June 2025, with a population density of 5.2 people per km^{2}.

Historical population for Kāeo statistical area
Year	Pop.	±% p.a.
2006	1,077	—
2013	1,005	−0.98%
2018	1,191	+3.45%
2023	1,299	+1.75%

Kāeo statistical area had a population of 1,299 in the 2023 New Zealand census, an increase of 108 people (9.1%) since the 2018 census, and an increase of 294 people (29.3%) since the 2013 census. There were 681 males, 615 females and 3 people of other genders in 438 dwellings. 1.8% of people identified as LGBTIQ+. The median age was 44.3 years (compared with 38.1 years nationally). There were 276 people (21.2%) aged under 15 years, 180 (13.9%) aged 15 to 29, 600 (46.2%) aged 30 to 64, and 240 (18.5%) aged 65 or older.

People could identify as more than one ethnicity. The results were 67.0% European (Pākehā); 51.5% Māori; 6.0% Pasifika; 1.6% Asian; 0.2% Middle Eastern, Latin American and African New Zealanders (MELAA); and 2.1% other, which includes people giving their ethnicity as "New Zealander". English was spoken by 96.5%, Māori language by 15.2%, Samoan by 0.2% and other languages by 5.1%. No language could be spoken by 1.8% (e.g. too young to talk). New Zealand Sign Language was known by 0.5%. The percentage of people born overseas was 12.9, compared with 28.8% nationally.

Religious affiliations were 22.6% Christian, 0.2% Hindu, 8.8% Māori religious beliefs, 0.5% Buddhist, 0.9% New Age, and 0.7% other religions. People who answered that they had no religion were 60.0%, and 6.2% of people did not answer the census question.

Of those at least 15 years old, 93 (9.1%) people had a bachelor's or higher degree, 582 (56.9%) had a post-high school certificate or diploma, and 315 (30.8%) people exclusively held high school qualifications. The median income was $27,800, compared with $41,500 nationally. 27 people (2.6%) earned over $100,000 compared to 12.1% nationally. The employment status of those at least 15 was that 387 (37.8%) people were employed full-time, 135 (13.2%) were part-time, and 33 (3.2%) were unemployed.

== Education ==
Kaeo Public School was built in 1877. It moved to the current Kaeo School site some years later. In 1941 it became Kaeo District High School, taking both primary and secondary students. It became a primary school when Whangaroa College opened in 1969. Kaeo School is now a coeducational contributing primary (years 1–6) school, with a roll of 136 students as of July 2026. The principal is Paul Barker.

Whangaroa College is a coeducational secondary (years 7–15) school on a site adjacent to Kaeo School. It has a roll of 100 students as of July 2026. The principal since 2015 is Jack Anderson.
