= Alice =

Alice may refer to:

- Alice (name), most often a feminine given name, but also used as a surname

It may also refer to:

== Arts and media ==
=== Literature ===
- Alice (Alice's Adventures in Wonderland), a character in books by Lewis Carroll
- Alice series, children's and teen books by Phyllis Reynolds Naylor
- Alice (Hermann book), a 2009 short story collection by Judith Hermann

=== Films ===
- Alice (1982 film), a musical-fantasy film co-produced by Belgian and Polish film companies
- Alice (1988 film), a Czech fantasy film that loosely adapts Alice's Adventures in Wonderland
- Alice (1990 film), an American romantic comedy by Woody Allen
- Alice (2002 film), a French-language LGBT-related film
- Alice (2005 film), a Portuguese drama
- Alice (2022 film), an American crime film starring Keke Palmer
- A.LI.CE, a 2000 Japanese anime film
- Alice: Ignorance Is Bliss, a short documentary
- The Alice (film), a 2004 Australian film

=== Music ===
==== Albums ====
- Alice (Per Elisa), 1981, by Alice
- Alice (1984 album), a compilation album by Alice
- Alice (1986 album), a compilation album by Alice
- Alice (Tom Waits album) (2002)
- Alice (Alice Caymmi album) (2018)
- Alice (EP), 1983, by The Sisters of Mercy

==== Performers ====
- Alice (Japanese band), a Japanese band formerly led by Shinji Tanimura
- Alice (Italian singer) (born 1954), San Remo winner and Eurovision participant
- Alice (South Korean group), South Korean girl group
- Alice (South Korean singer), former member of South Korean girl group Hello Venus
- Alisa (Russian band), a. k. a. Alice
- Alice, a band fronted by Dan Bárta

==== Songs ====
- "Alice" (Tom Waits song) (2002)
- "Alice" (Moby song) (2008)
- "Alice" (Avril Lavigne song) (2010)
- "Alice" (Lady Gaga song), (2020)
- "Alice" (Veronica Fusaro song), (2026)
- "Alice", by Stevie Nicks from The Other Side of the Mirror
- "Alice", by the Noir Désir from Tostaky
- "Alice", by Raven-Symoné from This Is My Time
- "Alice", by Cocteau Twins
- "Alice", 2007, by Pogo
- "Alice", 1995, by Mylène Farmer from Anamorphosée
- "Alice", a 1982 single by The Sisters of Mercy
- "Alice", a 2009 song by Sunn O))) from Monoliths & Dimensions
- "Alice" from the Nana Kitade album titled 18: Eighteen

=== Radio stations ===
- Radio Alice, an Italian pirate radio station
- Alice 96.1 (WQKS-FM), in Montgomery, Alabama
- Alice 107.7 (KLAL), in Little Rock, Arkansas
- Alice 97.3 (KLLC), in San Francisco, California
- Alice 105.9 (KALC), in Denver, Colorado
- Alice 97.7, the former branding of WLCE (now WQLZ), in Springfield, Illinois
- Alice 106.7 (WLLC), a former radio station in Detroit, Michigan
- Alice 95.5 (KTOZ-FM), in Springfield, Missouri
- Alice 104.5, the former branding of WLCE (now WRFF), a former radio station in Philadelphia, Pennsylvania

=== Television ===
- Alice (American TV series), a 1976–1985 American television sitcom that was broadcast on CBS
- Alice (Brazilian TV series), a 2008 Brazilian television drama series from HBO
- Alice (South Korean TV series), a 2020 South Korean television drama series from SBS
- Alice (2026 TV series), a series about Alice Guy-Blaché, starring Bérénice Bejo
- Alice (miniseries), a 2009 American television miniseries that aired on Syfy
- The Alice (TV series), a 2005–2006 Australian drama TV series, a spin-off from the film of the same name
- "Alice" (Star Trek: Voyager), a 1999 episode of Star Trek: Voyager

=== Video games ===
- Alice: An Interactive Museum, a 1991 adventure game
- American McGee's Alice, a 2000 computer game
  - Alice: Madness Returns, 2011 sequel to the above
- Through the Looking Glass (video game) or Alice, a 1984 Macintosh computer game

=== Other media ===
- Alice (painting), a c. 1918 painting by Amedeo Modigliani

== Computing ==
- Alice (computer chip), a graphics engine chip in the Amiga computer in 1992
- Alice (programming language), a functional programming language designed by the Programming Systems Lab at Saarland University
- Alice (software), an object-oriented programming language and IDE developed at Carnegie Mellon
- Alice (Microsoft), an AI project at Microsoft for improving decision-making in economics
- Alice mobile robot
- Artificial Linguistic Internet Computer Entity, an open-source chatterbot
- Matra Alice, a home micro-computer marketed in France
- Alice, a brand name used by Telecom Italia for internet and telephone services

== Places ==
- Alice Springs, Australia, also known as "the Alice"
- Alice, Queensland, Australia
- Alice Town, The Bahamas
- Alice Peak, a mountain in New Zealand
- Alice, São Tomé and Príncipe
- Alice, Eastern Cape, South Africa
- Alice, Colorado, US
- Alice, Missouri, US
- Alice, North Dakota, US
- Alice, Texas, US

== Vehicles ==
=== Ships ===
- USS Alice (1864), a screw tug
- USS Alice (1898), a harbor tug
- USS Alice (SP-367), a motorboat used as a dispatch boat in World War I
- SS Alice, various ships
- Alice (steam tug 1897), a steam tug built in Tacoma, Washington

=== Other vehicles ===
- Alice (locomotive), used at Llanberis in North Wales
- Eviation Alice, an electric aircraft

== Science ==
- ALICE experiment, a high-energy physics experiment
- ALICE (accelerator), a prototype accelerator
- Alice and Bob, archetypal characters in fields such as cryptography and physics
- ALICE (propellant), a rocket propellant
- Alice (spacecraft instrument), a UV imaging spectrograph on the New Horizons space probe and Rosetta spacecraft
- 291 Alice, a main belt asteroid
- Alice, a genus of beetle in the tribe Desmiphorini

== Other uses ==
- Tropical Storm Alice, a list of tropical storms
- Alice chess, a variant of chess
- ALICE (company), a hospitality management company
- Alice (mango), a cultivar that originated in south Florida
- All-purpose lightweight individual carrying equipment (ALICE), a military load-bearing system
- Exercise Alice, a MERS-CoV pandemic simulation exercise carried out by the UK Government in February 2016
- "Alert, Lockdown, Inform, Counter, Evacuate", in active shooter training
- Asset Limited, Income Constrained, Employed, a US category of people above the poverty line but effectively poor

== See also ==
- Alice 19th, a manga series by Yū Watase
- Alice Academy, a Japanese animated series
- Alice Corp. v. CLS Bank International, a 2014 US Supreme Court case
- Alice Doesn't Live Here Anymore, a 1974 film by Martin Scorsese
- Alice in Chains, an alternative rock band
- Alice in Wonderland (disambiguation)
- Alice, I Think (TV series), a Canadian comedy show on The Comedy Network
- Alicia (disambiguation)
- Alicja, a Polish-language given name
- Alis (disambiguation)
- Alisa (disambiguation)
- Alise (disambiguation)
- Allis (disambiguation)
- Alliss
- Gakuen Alice (Alice Academy), a manga series written by Tachibana Higuchi
- Doralice, an American female first name
