= Elisa (given name) =

- Gender: Female, Male & Unisex

Origin
- Meaning: My God is an oath

Other names
- Related names: Élise, Elijah, Eli, Eliza, Elizabeth, Elle, Lisa, Ellis, Elsa, Elias, Elisha

Elisa is a feminine and masculine (though not as common) given name. It is of Phoenician origin. According to legend, the first queen of Carthage was Elissa (also known as Dido). Another opinion is that it is a shortened form of Elisabeth, a variant of the Biblical name Elizabeth or that it is a shortened version of Elisha or Eliseus.

In the Greek (Septuagint) version of the Book of Genesis, Elisa is listed as one of the grandsons of Noah born after the flood.

Closely related names include Elissa, Eliza, Lisa, Elsa, Elisha, and the French form Élise.

For other uses, see Elisa (disambiguation).

== People with the name ==
- Elisa (Italian singer) (Elisa Toffoli, born 1977), Italian singer and songwriter
- Elisa (Japanese singer) (born 1989), Japanese singer and model
- Elisa Aaltola (born 1978), Finnish philosopher
- Elisa Albert (born 1978), American author
- Elisa Augusta da Conceição Andrade (born 1855), First Portuguese female doctor
- Elisa Badenes, Spanish ballet dancer
- Elisa Baldo (born 1986), Italian archer
- Elisa Balsamo (born 1998), Italian cyclist
- Elisa Berroeta, Chilean wood engraver, illustrator
- Élisa Bonaparte (1777–1820), sister of Napoleon
- Elisa Caffont (born 1999), Italian snowboarder
- Elisa Carrillo Cabrera (born 1981), Mexican ballet dancer
- Elisa Carrió (born 1956), Argentine lawyer, professor, and politician
- Elisa Christy (1917–2018), Mexican actress and dancer
- Elisa Confortola (born 2002), Italian short-track speed skater
- Elisa Cosetti (born 2002), Italian high diver
- Elisa Di Francisca (born 1982), Italian fencer
- Elisa Donovan (born 1971), American actress
- Elisa Fiorillo (born 1969), American singer
- Elisa Fuliano (born 1996), Italian CrossFit athlete
- Elisa Gabrielli, American actress and comedian
- Élisa Garnerin (1791–1853), French balloonist and parachutist
- Elisa Georgiou (born 1994), Greek Cypriot model
- Elisa Guerra, Mexican educator, writer and speaker
- Elisa Hämmerle (born 1995), Austrian artistic gymnast
- Elisa Holopainen (born 2001), Finnish ice hockey player
- Elisa Iorio (born 2003), Italian artistic gymnast
- Elisa Izquierdo (1989–1995), American murder victim
- Elisa Jimenez (born 1963), American fashion designer and Project Runway contestant
- Elisa Kadigia Bove (born 1943), Italian-Somali actress
- Elisa Lam (1991–2013), Canadian student whose death at the Cecil Hotel attracted wide attention
- Elisa Lassiter, American politician
- Elisa Lindström, Swedish singer
- Elisa Loncón (born 1963), Mapuche linguist and indigenous rights activist
- Élisa Martin (born 1972), French politician
- Elisa Marusic (born 1934), Chilean endocrinologist
- Elisa Mevius (born 2004), German basketball player
- Elisa Angela Meneguzzi (1901–1941), Italian religious
- Elisa Miller (born 1982), Mexican film director, writer, and producer
- Elisa Molina de Stahl (1918–1996), Guatemalan social worker and philanthropist
- Elisa Montemagni (born 1986), Italian politician
- Elisa Montessori (born 1931), Italian painter
- Elisa Mújica (1918–2003), Colombian writer
- Elisa New (born 1958), American academic
- Elisa Oricchio (born 1979), Italian cancer researcher and associate professor
- Elisa Pirro (born 1973), Italian politician
- Elisa Pizzini (born 2005), Italian diver
- Elisa Pritzker (born 1955), Argentine-American artist
- Elisa Quintana (born 1973), American astronomer
- Elisa Radziwill (1803–1834), Polish aristocrat
- Elisa Riedo, nanotechnologist
- Elisa Roner (born 2001), Italian archer
- Ana Elisa Santos Silva (born 2005), Brazilian politician
- Elisa Scutellà (born 1987), Italian politician
- Elisa Servenius (fl. 1809), Swedish soldier
- Elisa Silva (born 1999), Portuguese singer
- Elisa Siragusa (born 1986), Italian politician
- Elisa Togut (born 1978), Italian volleyball player
- Elisa Tripodi (born 1986), Italian politician
- Elisa Valero, Spanish architect and professor
- Elisa Venturini (born 1979), Italian politician
- Elisa Volpatto (born 1986), Brazilian television and film actress
- Elisa Yukie Yokoyama (born 1997), Singaporean sailor
- Elisa Zamacois (1838–1915), Spanish singer and actress
- Elisa Zulueta (born 1984), Chilean television and film actress
- Lisvel Elisa Eve (born 1991), Dominican Republic volleyball player
- Subcomandante Elisa (born 1955), Zapatista activist

=== Fictional characters with the name ===
- Elisa Maza in the Disney animated series Gargoyles
- Elisa, a child psychic from Metal Gear Solid: Portable Ops.
- Elisa, a non-playable Mii opponent in the Wii series
- Lucero-Elisa de Riqueza, protagonist of the "Fire and Thorns" trilogy, by Rae Carson.

== See also ==
- Elisa (disambiguation)
- Elisha
- Eliza (given name)
