= Guerra =

Guerra is a Portuguese, Spanish and Italian term meaning "war". Notable people with the surname Guerra include:

== People ==
=== Arts ===
- Aaron Guerra, American guitarist
- Adam Daniel Guerra (born 1983), American drag queen also known as Venus D-Lite
- Ana Clara Guerra Marques (born 1962), Angolan dancer
- Andrea Guerra (composer) (born 1961), Italian composer
- Aureliano Fernández-Guerra (1816–1894), Spanish historian, poet and playwright
- Carlos Rivera Guerra (born 1986), Mexican singer
- Carolina Guerra (born 1987), Colombian model and actress
- Cástulo Guerra (born 1945), Argentine actor
- César Guerra-Peixe (1914–1993), Brazilian violinist
- Ciro Guerra (born 1981), Colombian film director, screenwriter
- Ely Guerra (born 1972), Mexican singer
- Gabriel Guerra (1847–1893), Mexican sculptor
- Giovanni Guerra (1544–1618), Italian painter
- Gregório de Matos e Guerra (1636–1696), Brazilian poet
- Juan Luis Guerra (born 1957), Dominican singer
- Lília Guerra (born 1976), Brazilian author
- Marcelino Guerra (1914–1996), Cuban singer
- María Inés Guerra (born 1983), Mexican singer
- Pedro Guerra (born 1966), Spanish singer
- Pia Guerra (born 1971), Canadian comic book artist
- Raquel Guerra (born 1985), Portuguese singer
- Rita Guerra (born 1967), Portuguese singer
- Robert Guerra, American set designer
- Rosa Guerra (1834–1864), Argentine educator, journalist, writer
- Ruy Guerra (born 1931), Portuguese-Brazilian actor and director
- Shekhar Gurera (born 1965), Indian cartoonist
- Tom Guerra, American guitarist
- Tonino Guerra (1920–2012), Italian screenwriter and poet
- Wendy Guerra (born 1970), Cuban writer
- Yalil Guerra (born 1973), Cuban guitarist

=== Sport ===
- Aidan Guerra (born 1988), Australian rugby footballer
- Alejandra de la Guerra (born 1968), Peruvian volleyball player
- Alejandro Guerra (born 1985), Venezuelan footballer
- Andrea Guerra (footballer) (born 1972), Italian footballer
- Ariana Guerra, American gymnast
- Ascension Guerra, Spanish archer
- Aumi Guerra (born 1977), Dominican bowler
- Brent Guerra (born 1982), Australian footballer
- Deolis Guerra (born 1989), Venezuelan baseball player
- Elvira Guerra (1855–1937), Italian equestrienne
- Feliciano López Diaz-Guerra (born 1981), Spanish tennis player
- Hugo Guerra (1966–2018), Uruguayan footballer
- Jackie Guerra (footballer) (born 1989), American-born Puerto Rican footballer
- Javi Guerra (born 2003), Spanish football player
- Javy Guerra (born 1985), American baseball player
- Jorge Guerra (1913–2003), Chilean cyclist
- Jorge Guerra (born 1959, known as Jorge Guerrinha), Brazilian basketball player and coach
- José Guerra (diver) (born 1979), Cuban diver
- Juan Guerra (footballer, born 1927), Bolivian footballer
- Juan Guerra (footballer, born 1991), Spanish footballer
- Juan Francisco Guerra Venezuelan footballer
- Junior Guerra (born 1985), Venezuelan baseball player
- Kleber Guerra, Brazilian footballer
- Learco Guerra (1902–1963), Italian cyclist
- Lisandra Guerra (1987), Cuban cyclist
- Martín Alejandro Machón Guerra (born 1973), Guatemalan footballer
- Mike Guerra (1912–1992), Cuban baseball player
- Miguel Ángel Guerra (born 1953), Argentinian racer
- Miguel Ángel Cascallana Guerra (1948–2015), Spanish handball player
- Naomie Guerra (born 1996), Trinidadian footballer
- Patricia Guerra (born 1965), Spanish sailor
- Paulo Guerra (born 1970), Portuguese runner
- Pedro Ramos Guerra (born 1935), Cuban baseball player
- Pietro Guerra (born 1943), Italian cyclist
- Rafael Sánchez Guerra (1897–1964), Spanish football club president
- Silvio Guerra (born 1968), Ecuadorian runner
- Simone Guerra (born 1989), Italian footballer
- Waldir Guerra (born 1967), Salvadoran footballer

=== Politics ===
- Abel Guerra (born 1954), Mexican politician
- Abílio Manuel Guerra Junqueiro (1850–1923), Portuguese politician
- Alberto Begné Guerra (born 1963), Mexican politician
- Alfonso Guerra (born 1940), Spanish politician
- Braulio Guerra (born 1972), Mexican politician
- Gabriel Guerra-Mondragón (born 1942), American diplomat
- José Amado Ricardo Guerra, Cuban politician
- José Gutiérrez Guerra (1869–1929), Bolivian President
- Juan Nicasio Guerra (born 1954), Mexican politician
- Marcela Guerra (born 1959), Mexican politician
- Marcela Guerra Castillo (born 1959), Mexican politician
- Pablo de la Guerra (1819–1874), American politician
- Pedro Cevallos Guerra (1759–1838), Spanish diplomat
- Reynaldo Guerra Garza (1915–2004), American judge

=== Military ===
- Antonio Barroso y Sánchez-Guerra (1893–1982), Spanish general
- Donato Guerra (1832–1876), 19th-century Mexican general
- Eutímio Guerra, Cuban army guide
- José de Bustamante y Guerra (1759–1825), Spanish naval officer and explorer
- José Antonio de la Guerra y Noriega (1779–1858), Californian soldier and settler

=== Religion ===
- Armando Guerra, Guatemalan Anglican bishop
- Fernando da Guerra (c. 1390–1467), Portuguese ecclesiastic
- Francisco Guerra (bishop) (1587–1657), Spanish bishop
- García Guerra (c. 1547–1612), Spanish bishop
- José Servando Teresa de Mier Noriega y Guerra (1765–1827), priest in New Spain (now Mexico)

=== Other ===
- Elisa Guerra, Mexican educator, writer and speaker
- Francesco Guerra (1942–2025), Italian mathematical physicist
- Humberto Guerra Allison, Peruvian doctor
- Juan Nepomuceno Guerra (1915–2001), Mexican cartel founder
- María José Guerra Palmero (born 1962), Spanish philosopher, writer, and feminist theorist
- Rafael Guerra Bejarano (1862–1941), Spanish bullfighter
- Reyes Tamez Guerra (born 1952), Mexican chemist
- Vida Guerra (born 1974), American model
- Oscar Guerra (born 1961), Cuban-American, Heart Surgeon

== Fictional characters ==
- Carmen Guerra from the television show Oz

== See also ==
- Guerra (disambiguation)
- Kampf (disambiguation)
