= Eliza =

Eliza or ELIZA may refer to:

- Eliza (given name), a female given name (including a list of people and characters with the name)
- ELIZA, a 1966 computer program designed to simulate a therapist or psychoanalyst
  - ELIZA effect, the tendency to relate computer behavior to human behavior
- Eliza (computer virus), a DOS/Windows virus discovered in 1991
- Eliza (magazine), an American fashion magazine
- Eliza (ship), several ships
- Eliza (horse), an American Thoroughbred racehorse

== Arts and entertainment ==
- Eliza (Arne), a 1754 opera by Thomas Arne
- Eliza (Cherubini), a 1794 opera by Luigi Cherubini
- Eliza (sculpture), a public artwork in the Swan River, Western Australia
- "Eliza", a song by Phish from their 1992 album A Picture of Nectar
- Eliza (English singer), English singer and songwriter formerly known as Eliza Doolittle
- Eliza (video game), a 2019 video game

== See also ==
- Elisa (disambiguation)
- Elisa (given name)
- ELISA (biochemical analytical procedure)
- Elise (disambiguation)
- Liza (disambiguation)
