= Alise =

Alise may refer to:

== People ==
- Variant of Alice (given name)
- Variant of Alix (given name)
- Variant of Élise
- Dame Alise, Alix Pahlavouni wife of Constantine of Baberon (died c. 1263), Armenian noble
- Alise Post (1991) American BMX racer
- Alise Alousi, Iraqi American poet living in Detroit
- Marie-Alise Recasner, American actress

== Places ==
- Alise-Sainte-Reine a commune in the Côte-d'Or, site of pre-Roman town
- Alise, name of ancient Alesia (city) taken by Julius Caesar in the Wars in Gaul

== Other ==
- Alise (album), by Dzeltenie Pastnieki
- Association for Library and Information Science Education (ALISE)
- Princess Alise, a fictional character in the 2014 animated film The Swan Princess: A Royal Family Tale

== See also ==
- Elise (disambiguation)
- Alice (disambiguation)
- Alis (disambiguation)
