= Alicja =

Alicja is a Polish language given name that is equivalent to Alice in English. Notable people with the name include:

- Alicja Bachleda-Curuś (born 1983), Polish actress and singer
- Alicja Bobrowska (1936–2025), Polish model and actress, Miss Polonia in 1957
- Alicja Boratyn (born 1992), Polish singer
- Alicja Derkowska (born 1940), Polish social activist, mathematician and educator
- Alicja Dobrołęcka (born 2003), Polish rhythmic gymnast
- Alicja Dorabialska (1897–1975), Polish chemist
- Alicja Fiodorow, Paralympian athlete from Poland competing mainly in category T46 sprint events
- Alicja Janosz (born 1985), the winner of Polish Idol in 2002
- Alicja Kotowska (1899–1939), Polish nun, head of the Resurrectionist convent in Wejherowo 1934 to 1939, martyred by the German Nazis in 1939
- Alicja Kwade (born 1979), Polish-German visual artist
- Alicja Majewska (born 1948), Polish singer
- Alicja Olechowska (born 1956), Polish politician
- Alicja Pęczak (born 1970), retired breaststroke and medley swimmer from Poland
- Alicja Rosolska, Polish professional tennis player
- Alicja Sakaguchi (born 1954), Polish linguist and university professor in the field of Esperanto and interlinguistics
- Alicja Szemplińska (born 2002), also known mononymously as Alicja, Polish singer, entrant for 2020 and 2026 Eurovision Song Contest
- Alicja Trout, Memphis-based American rock guitarist, singer, songwriter and artist

== See also ==
- Prokurator Alicja Horn, 1933 Polish film directed by Marta Flanz and Michał Waszyński
- Alicja (film), a 1982 Polish-British co-production
