= Alliss =

Alliss is a surname. Notable people with the surname include:

- Percy Alliss (1897–1975), English golfer
- Peter Alliss (1931–2020), English golfer, son of Percy
  - Peter Alliss Masters, children's charity founded by Peter Alliss

== See also ==
- ALLISS, a type of shortwave radio antennae
- Allis (disambiguation)
- Alis (disambiguation)
- Alice (disambiguation)
