= Alis =

Alis may refer to:

== People ==
- Alis (given name)
- Alis (singer), Albanian singer and songwriter
- Román Alís (1931–2006), Spanish composer
- Abdulla Aliş (1908–1944), Soviet writer

== Places ==
- Alis, Greece
- Alis District, Yauyos, Lima, Peru

== Other uses ==
- Alis (film), a 2022 documentary film
- Alternate lighting of surfaces, a plasma display technology
- Autonomic Logistics Information System, a special logistics automation program for the Lockheed Martin F-35 Lightning II

== See also ==
- Ali (disambiguation)
- Allis (disambiguation)
- Alliss, a surname
- Alice (disambiguation)
- Elise (disambiguation)
