= Brooke White =

American musician

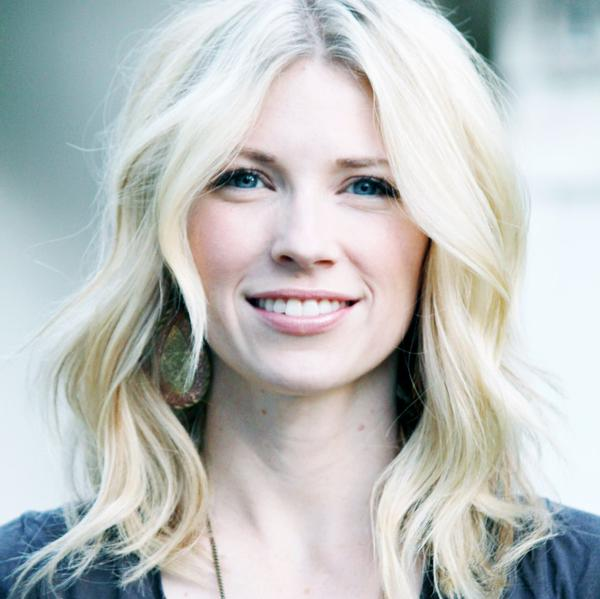
- Brooke White in September 2022

Background information
- Born: Brooke Elizabeth White; June 2, 1983 (age 43); Phoenix, Arizona, US
- Origin: Mesa, Arizona, United States
- Genre: Folk-pop
- Occupations: Singer-songwriter, actress
- Instruments: Vocals, guitar, piano, keyboards
- Years active: 2005–present
- Label: June Baby Records (2009–present)
- Member of: Jack and White
- Website: BrookeWhite.com

Brooke Elizabeth White (born June 2, 1983) is an American folk-pop singer-songwriter and actress who was the fifth place finalist on the seventh season of American Idol. In 2005, White released her first studio album, called Songs from the Attic.

White's first post-Idol album, High Hopes & Heartbreak, was released on July 21, 2009. The first single "Hold Up My Heart" was released on February 25, 2009, and the song debuted at number 47 on the Billboard Hot 100. The second single "Radio Radio" was released on June 23, 2009. She is also half of the duo Jack and White.

== Biography ==
=== Early life ===
Brooke Elizabeth White was born in Phoenix, Arizona, and raised in nearby Mesa, with three younger siblings (Katie, Tyler, and Quinn) and her parents, Brad and Kaylene. She also has family members in Nova Scotia, Canada.

=== Personal life ===
White started singing at 16, when she tried out for the high school musical, Meet Me in St. Louis, and earned the lead role. White graduated in 2001 from Heritage Academy, a charter high school in Mesa, Arizona. She described herself as a "beauty school dropout," and shared on Idol that she started doing hair when she was 11 years old. White moved to Los Angeles, California when she was 19 years old where she attended the Musicians Institute for three months and then spent the next four years honing her craft as a singer-songwriter recording in the studio and performing in the clubs of Hollywood, California under the guidance of Tim Simms. White also spent a year as a nanny for twin baby girls. During her elimination video on American Idol, White stated "It's probably not a secret that I struggled with my own confidence but I'm stronger than I thought I was and that's a great thing to get out of this." White currently resides in Van Nuys, California, with her husband, David Ray. White is a member of the Church of Jesus Christ of Latter-day Saints. White and her husband have one daughter, born on May 24, 2012 and one son, born September 3, 2016.

== American Idol ==
=== Overview ===
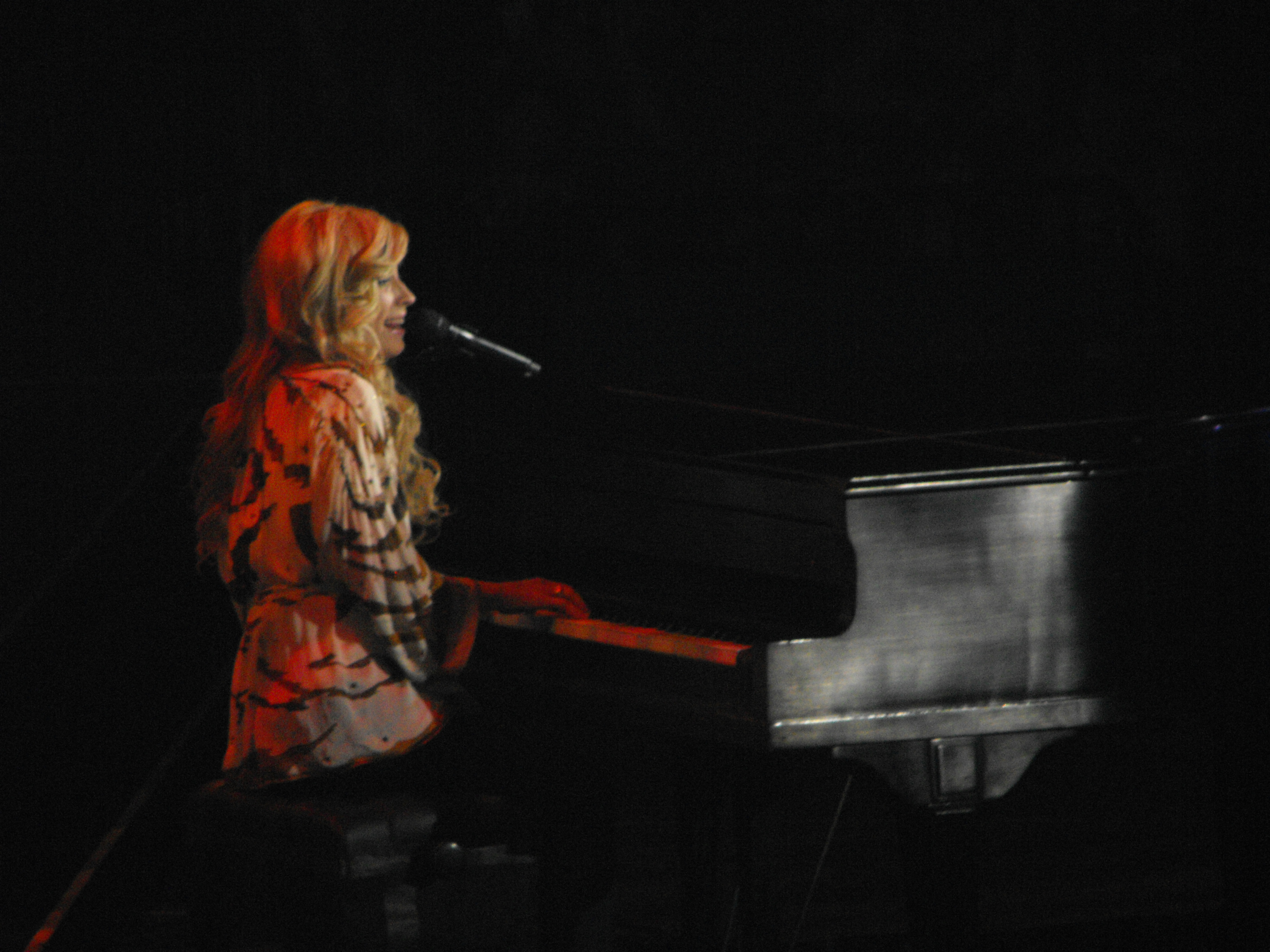
White performing during the American Idols Live! Tour 2008

White auditioned for American Idol, in Philadelphia, where she sang "Like a Star" and received positive reviews from all of the judges. During her audition, she admitted to never having seen an R-rated movie, which prompted Cowell to state that he could "bring her over to the dark side." During Hollywood week, White performed "Beautiful", by Carole King, and accompanied herself on piano. After that performance, judges commented that White reminded them of a young Carly Simon or Carole King.

In the live rounds of the competition, White accompanied herself on guitar for her performances of "You're So Vain", "Jolene", and "I'm a Believer" and on piano for "Let It Be", "Every Breath You Take", "Hero" and "I Am...I Said". Judge Simon Cowell chose White early as one of his four favorites in the competition when he appeared on The Oprah Winfrey Show on March 17, 2008.

During the 1970s theme week, while White performed "You're So Vain", by Carly Simon, she stared at Simon Cowell. It caught the judges' attention and received good reviews from them. White performed an acoustic version of "Love Is a Battlefield" by Pat Benatar, in the next week to good reviews, as well. During the Lennon–McCartney week, she performed "Let It Be", a classic song by The Beatles. Randy Jackson said it was a very heartfelt performance and Simon Cowell said that it was believable and one of the best of the night and that he thought that Brooke had picked good song choices in the past three weeks.

Andrew Lloyd Webber, who served as guest mentor for a show, based on his own music, was particularly impressed by White and predicted a big night for her. However, three lines into her performance of "You Must Love Me", White apologized, stopped the band and restarted the song from the beginning. She later explained, "I lost the lyric." Simon Cowell stated that he would have done the same thing, had he been in her situation. It was the first time in the show's history that a contestant restarted a performance from a point so far into the song. (White had previously restarted "Every Breath You Take", after a single odd note.) Despite this, she was the third contestant to be named safe on the subsequent results show, while Carly Smithson went home.

When White performed "I'm a Believer" and "I Am...I Said", during Neil Diamond week, she personalized the latter, at Diamond's own suggestion, by changing the lyrics from "I'm New York City born and raised" to "I'm Arizona born and raised."

White was in the bottom three three times, once on April 2 after performing Dolly Parton's song "Jolene", again on April 16 after performing Mariah Carey's "Hero", and when she was eliminated on April 30, 2008, after performing "I'm a Believer" and "I Am...I Said".

=== Performances/results ===
Week #	Theme	Song choice	Original artist	Order #	Result
Audition	N/A	"Like a Star"	Corinne Bailey Rae	N/A	Advanced
Hollywood	N/A	"Beautiful"	Carole King	N/A	Advanced
Hollywood	N/A	"God Only Knows"	The Beach Boys	N/A	Advanced
Top 24 (12 Women)	1960s	"Happy Together"	The Turtles	6	Safe
Top 20 (10 Women)	1970s	"You're So Vain"	Carly Simon	3	Safe
Top 16 (8 Women)	1980s	"Love Is a Battlefield"	Pat Benatar	7	Safe
Top 12	Lennon–McCartney	"Let It Be"	The Beatles	7	Safe
Top 11	The Beatles	"Here Comes the Sun"	The Beatles	5	Safe
Top 10	Year They Were Born	"Every Breath You Take"	The Police	5	Safe
Top 9	Dolly Parton	"Jolene"	Dolly Parton	1	Bottom 3^{1}
Top 8	Inspirational Music	"You've Got a Friend"	Carole King	8	Safe
Top 7	Mariah Carey	"Hero"	Mariah Carey	4	Bottom 2^{2}
Top 6	Andrew Lloyd Webber	"You Must Love Me"	Madonna	3	Safe
Top 5	Neil Diamond	"I'm a Believer" "I Am...I Said"	The Monkees; Neil Diamond	3; 8	Eliminated

- ^1 White was saved first from elimination.
- ^2 When Ryan Seacrest announced the results for this particular night, White was among the Bottom 3 but declared safe second, when Kristy Lee Cook was eliminated.

== Post-Idol ==
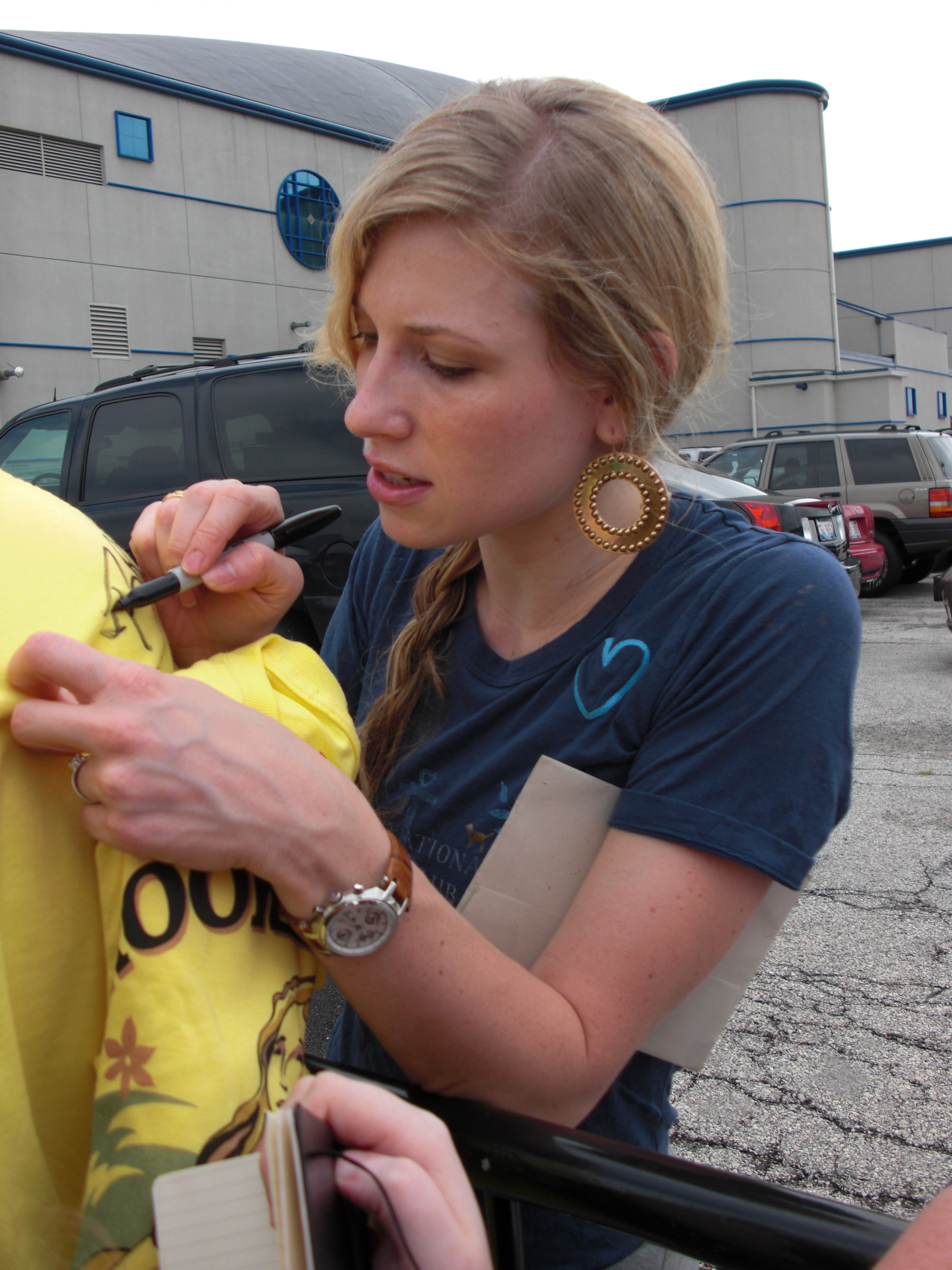
White signing autographs during the American Idols Live! Tour 2008

In an interview with Entertainment Weekly, White stated that she will continue to focus on recording and that she received a call from Carly Simon. When asked about returning as a nanny of the twins, White said that the family joked that they would give her a raise, if she went back, and she said that she did not mind babysitting every once in a while. After White's elimination, she made appearances on The Tonight Show with Jay Leno on May 1, 2008, Live with Regis and Kelly and The Ellen DeGeneres Show on May 5, 2008, The Morning Show with Mike & Juliet on May 6, 2008, Good Day L.A. and Access Hollywood. She also filmed an appearance on MTV's Total Request Live on May 6, 2008. While on The Ellen DeGeneres Show, Ellen DeGeneres cut White's husband David's hair, since he had vowed not to cut it until Brooke was eliminated from Idol. She performed "You're So Vain" on The Ellen DeGeneres Show, Live with Regis and Kelly, The Morning Show with Mike & Juliet and Access Hollywood. White shot a video for the VH1 TV show Best Week Ever, called "Brooke White Starts And Stops The Classics." In the video, White mocks herself and starts and stops while singing some classic songs. White returned to the Idol stage for the season finale and performed, along with the other Top 12 contestants. She also sang "Teach Your Children", with Graham Nash. White filmed a commercial with fellow finalists, Syesha Mercado and Carly Smithson, she has become the spokeswoman for "Save The World Summer", a campaign launched by Malaria No More and Idol Gives Back. White stated in an interview that she would not sign a record deal until the tour finished. "There are definitely certain things that I have to abide with in my American Idol contract. I won't sign anything, until three months after the show is over. That doesn't mean that I'm not looking ahead and preparing for the future. The point of doing the show was not just to be on TV but to launch into a real career." White completed the American Idols LIVE! Tour 2008, which ran from July 1, 2008, to September 13, 2008. She performed "Let It Be" by the Beatles, "1234" by Feist and "Yellow" by Coldplay (which is also included on White's debut album Songs From the Attic). White was on the Fall 2008 cover of Eliza magazine. The cover was accompanied by an eight-page fashion story and article. On September 27, 2008 (proclaimed by the mayor of Mesa to be "Brooke White Day"), Brooke White visited her hometown of Mesa, AZ, and signed autographs at Milano Music Center and performed at the Mesa Amphitheater. The performance was free to the public; however, donations to Malaria No More were accepted. The event was sponsored by the Mesa Convention Center, Milano Music Center, and Malaria No More. White also appeared at the NAMM Show and did an impromptu performance of "You're So Vain" at the Gibson booth. She launched BrookeWhiteMusic.net as her official website, but later announced on her Twitter that the new official site was RealBrookeWhite.com She sang "Dancing a Catchy Rhythm" with Jennifer Hudson for the Walt Disney World Paris parade. White also collaborated with Michael Johns for a song called, Life is Okay. White performed the song with Johns. She and fellow Idol alumn Michael Johns performed joint concerts, in September 2009. She will appear solo at a concert in Washington, DC, on October 10, 2009. On November 10, 2009, an exclusive holiday EP by White was released on iTunes and contained the songs "Away in a Manger", "Blue Christmas" and "California Christmas".

== Career ==
=== Songs from the Attic (2005) ===
White's debut album, Songs from the Attic, was released nationwide in the US by the independent record label New Millennium Records Group, in 2005, and was produced and co-written by Tim Simms. Songs from the Attic is a full-length 11 song album which contains some of White's first songs that she ever wrote and recorded. The album also contains cover versions of Aerosmith's "Dream On" and Coldplay's "Yellow". White's first music video was from a song off Songs from the Attic, entitled, "Free", which was directed by Braden Barty and produced by Tim Simms. In the video, she acts out her story as a beauty school dropout who moves to Hollywood to pursue a singing career. Songs from the Attic was re-released, after White was eliminated from American Idol.

=== High Hopes and Heartbreak (2009–2011) ===
On January 31, White announced that she signed with Sanctuary Artist Management, instead of earlier reported Sanctuary Records. She also announced that the title of her new album would be called High Hopes & Heartbreak. On February 25, 2009, White released her first single, "Hold Up My Heart," written entirely by White. The song featured a piano riff that repeated throughout with a mid-tempo beat. White returned to American Idol to perform her debut single, on the February 26 results show and played the keyboard to accompany the song. White announced, in May 2009, that she started her own record label "June Baby Records", with Randy Jackson, and her first post-Idol album, High Hopes & Heartbreak, would be available July 21, 2009. The second single off the album "Radio Radio" was available on iTunes on June 23. The album was originally supposed to be dropped on June 2, 2009, but was postponed to release a little more than two months later, as said in White's blog entry for May 15. White held a live webcast at 5 pm PST, on July 9, 2009, and announced that she had teamed up with iTunes and her album High Hopes & Heartbreak was to be exclusively digitally released from the iTunes Store on the July 14, as well as the music video of her second single Radio Radio to be available for downloads free on the same date. During the webcast, she performed 3 songs on her album, including her single "Radio Radio", her cover of Use Somebody originally by the Kings of Leon and the title track off her album, "High Hopes & Heartbreak", all performed with her on the keyboard. A 'backstage pass' was also released in connection with The Republic Project, which allows purchasers to receive and view behind-the-scenes videos of the making of High Hopes & Heartbreak. 10 lucky purchasers of the backstage pass were chosen to attend the live webcast, in Los Angeles, which streamed live on July 9 on Facebook and uStream. A Live Session EP was released on the October 13, 2009, exclusively on the iTunes Store. It consisted of five songs recorded live during her summer tour with fellow 'Idol' mate Michael Johns and Benton Paul. The five songs included three acoustic and piano versions from "High Hopes & Heartbreak", a cover of Fleetwood Mac's "Rhiannon" and a personal song that White wrote, "Take it Away."

=== Jack and White (2011–2016) ===
Brooke White partnered up with singer-songwriter Jack Matranga to form a duo Jack and White and released a six-song EP entitled Gemini. They got together initially to write songs for her new solo album but ended up releasing an EP together. White and Jack Matranga teamed up for the second time on a new EP titled Winter, released on January 24, 2012, which included four original tracks and a live acoustic version of "Telephone Games." The first single was "Night After Night." Later in 2012, the duo released Undercover, a 6-song EP of covers spanning six decades.

=== Brooke White Christmas (2012) ===
White's first Christmas album was released in 2012 on June Baby Records featuring eleven tracks including "Blue Christmas" and "Silent Night." She performed her rendition of Paul McCartney's "Wonderful Christmastime" on NBC's Rockefeller Center Christmas Tree Lighting in 2012.

=== Never Grow Up: Lullabies and Happy Songs (2014) ===
In November, White announced she will be recording a lullaby album on PledgeMusic to raise money for the charity Operation Underground Railroad, who rescues children from sexual slavery. Brooke collaborated with different artists on each song with a goal to raise $20,000. Foundation Entertainment has pledged to match all donations, dollar for dollar, up to $20,000. Collaborators include fellow American Idol alums David Archuleta and Carly Smithson, Leigh Nash, Deana Carter, Lucy Schwartz, John Hanson, Mindy Gledhill, Jack Matranga, Daniel Tashian and Chris Seefried.

=== Calico (2019) ===
On October 4, 2019, White released a country album, Calico, short for "California Country", via Nevado Music / June Baby Records. White collaborated with Eric Straube and Chris Qualls for the album.

== Musical influences ==
White cites her musical influences as the "soulful sounds of the 70s," such as the Carpenters, Carole King, Fleetwood Mac, James Taylor, Elton John, Stevie Wonder, the Eagles, America, Carly Simon, the Bee Gees, Hall & Oates, Joni Mitchell, Bonnie Raitt and Phil Collins. When asked on American Idol with whom she would like to do a duet, she named John Mayer as her choice for a modern artist. She also says that, if she could choose a partner for a "dream duet," she would choose Carole King, whom she cites as one of her main influences. She also cites Kelly Clarkson and Carrie Underwood as her favorite former American Idol winners. Carly Simon, one of the singers who inspired White, said publicly that her favorite contestant on Idol was Brooke. She was impressed with White's performance of "You're So Vain" and said that she thought, "Oh my God, this girl is so talented and she sings the song so much better than I ever did or ever could."

== Acting ==
White starred in a TV movie, Change of Plans, which aired on January 8, 2011. She wrote and performed three songs for the movie: "Something Beautiful," "Let Us Live As One" and "Love Lovin' You". Brooke starred in another TV movie, Banner 4th of July, which aired on June 29, 2013. White wrote, recorded and performed two original songs for the movie, "Sun Up Sun Down" and "Fly Fly Fly."

== Discography ==
=== Studio albums ===
Year	Album details	Peak positions		Sales
Year	Album details	US	US Indie	Sales
2005	Songs from the Attic: Released: October 18, 2005; Label: New Millennium Records Group	—	—	US sales: 55,000
2009	High Hopes & Heartbreak: Released: July 21, 2009; Label: June Baby Records	50	7	US sales: 50,000
2012	White Christmas: Released: November 6, 2012; Label: June Baby Records	—	—	
2014	Never Grow Up: Lullabies and Happy Songs: Released: December 31, 2014; Label: June Baby Records	—	—	Charity record on PledgeMusic
2019	Calico: Released: October 4, 2019; Label: June Baby Records	—	—	
"—" denotes releases that did not chart

=== EP ===
Year	EP details	Peak positions			Sales
Year	EP details	Top Current Albums	US Indie	Sound track	Sales
2009	Live Session EP (iTunes Exclusive): Released: October 13, 2009; Label: June Baby	—	—	—	
2009	Holiday EP (iTunes exclusive): Released: November 10, 2009; Label: June Baby	—	—	—	
2011	Gemini (as part of Jack and White): Released: August 30, 2011; Label: June Baby Records	192	36	—	US sales: 2,000
2012	Winter (as part of Jack and White): Released: January 24, 2012; Label: June Baby Records	—	43	—	
2012	Undercover (as part of Jack and White): Released: May 29, 2012; Label: June Baby Records	—	—	—	
2013	Banner 4th of July (Original Soundtrack): Released:June 25, 2013; Label: June Baby Records	—	—	18	
2015	Lost (as part of Jack and White): Released: November 13, 2015; Label: June Baby Records	—	—	—	
"—" denotes releases that did not chart

=== Singles ===
Year	Single	Chart positions		Album
Year	Single	US	US AC	Album
2009	"Hold Up My Heart"	47	—	High Hopes & Heartbreak
2009	"Radio Radio"	—	29	High Hopes & Heartbreak
"—" denotes releases that did not chart

=== Other charted songs ===
Year	Single	Chart positions		Album	Sales
Year	Single	Bubbling Under	US HAC	Album	Sales
2009	"Use Somebody"	22	—	High Hopes & Heartbreak	
2010	"Change"	—	29	Secrets of the Mountain Soundtrack	3,000

=== Featured singles ===
- "Life Is Okay" (Michael Johns featuring Brooke White)

=== Other releases ===
iTunes Exclusive "American Idol Live Performances"

1. "Happy Together"
2. "You're So Vain"
3. "Love Is a Battlefield"

iTunes Exclusive "American Idol Studio Performances"^{1}

1. "Let It Be" – 3:30
2. "Here Comes the Sun" – 2:51
3. "Every Breath You Take" – 3:54
4. "Jolene" – 2:39
5. "You've Got a Friend" – 5:08
6. "Hero" – 3:54
7. "You Must Love Me" – 2:40
8. "I Am...I Said" – 3:31

Live Session (iTunes Exclusive) – EP

1. "Rhiannon" – 3:13
2. "Hold Up My Heart" – 3:21
3. "Radio Radio" – 3:23
4. "High Hopes & Heartbreak" – 3:42
5. "Take It Away" – 2:58
