= Songs from the Attic =

Studio album by Brooke White
- Released: October 18, 2005; July 2008 (re-release)
- Genre: Pop, pop rock
- Length: 41:15
- Label: New Millennium Records Group
- Producer: Tim Simms

Brooke White chronology
| Songs from the Attic (2005) | High Hopes & Heartbreak (2009) |

Professional ratings
Review scores
| Source | Rating |
|---|---|
| Allmusic | 3/5 stars |

Songs from the Attic is Brooke White's first studio album, released before White's appearance on the seventh season of American Idol. It was released in late 2005 under the independent label New Millennium Records Group.

The title "Songs from the Attic" was chosen because it was written and recorded in the attic (turned recording studio) of music producer Tim Simms' house in Hollywood, California.

The album was re-released to retail stores in July 2008, while White was on tour with American Idol.

== Information ==
Songs from the Attic has had 14,657 digital downloads and 2,894 hard copy sales since its re-release after her elimination, total records sales reaching about 22,000 since its first release. Despite this, the album did not enter official album charts like the Billboard 200 due to Billboard's policy and eligibility requirements for an album to 'chart'. Since then the album has garnered more than 50,000 downloads.

== Songs ==
The song "Come to My Rescue" was the first song White ever played for Tim Simms, and it was with this song that Simms "knew he'd found something special. It was just like...when the hairs on the back of your neck go up." Their goal was to keep the album "organic." Along with the songs co-written by Simms, White, and Robin Randall, the album has two covers: "Dream On", originally by Aerosmith, and "Yellow", originally by Coldplay.

The song "Free" was shot as an indie music video. It was directed by Braden Barty and produced by Tim Simms. In the video, White playfully acts out her story as a beauty school dropout who moves to Hollywood to pursue a singing career. The video helped her place 2nd in a radio contest in Hollywood, California.

== Track listing ==
| No. | Title | Length |
|---|---|---|
| 1. | "Free" (Brooke White) | 3:05 |
| 2. | "The Way Things Used to Be" (White/Robin Randall) | 3:25 |
| 3. | "Dream On" (Originally performed by Aerosmith) | 4:59 |
| 4. | "Come to My Rescue" (White/R. Randall) | 3:27 |
| 5. | "In Love" (White) | 3:44 |
| 6. | "Like I Do" (White/Tim Simms) | 4:00 |
| 7. | "Change" (White) | 4:08 |
| 8. | "Yellow" (Originally performed by Coldplay) | 3:38 |
| 9. | "Let It Go" (White) | 3:38 |
| 10. | "Follow Me" (White/Simms) | 2:55 |
| 11. | "Keep Running" (Judithe Randall/R. Randall) | 4:16 |
| Total length: | | 41:15 |
