= Elissa =

Elissa may refer to:

== People ==
- Elissa (name), including a list of people with the given name
- Dido, founder and first queen of Carthage in Greek and Roman mythology, also referred to as Elissa or Alyssa
- Elissa (singer) (born 1971), Lebanese singer and actress

== Other uses ==
- Elissa (book), a 1900 novel by H. Rider Haggard
- Elissa (ship), a historic sailing ship anchored in Galveston Bay
- Elissa, one of the seven women occurring as narrators in Giovanni Boccaccio's The Decameron

== See also ==
- Elisa (disambiguation)
- Elise (disambiguation)
- Eliza (disambiguation)
- Alisa (disambiguation)
- Lisa (disambiguation)
