= Elyssa =

Elyssa is a given name. Notable people with the name include:

- Elyssa Biederman (born 2004), American ice hockey player
- Elyssa Davalos (born 1959), American actress
- Elyssa East (fl. 2010), American author

== See also ==
- Alyssa, given name
- Elissa (disambiguation)
