= Ana Clara Guerra Marques =

Angolan professional dancer (born 1962)

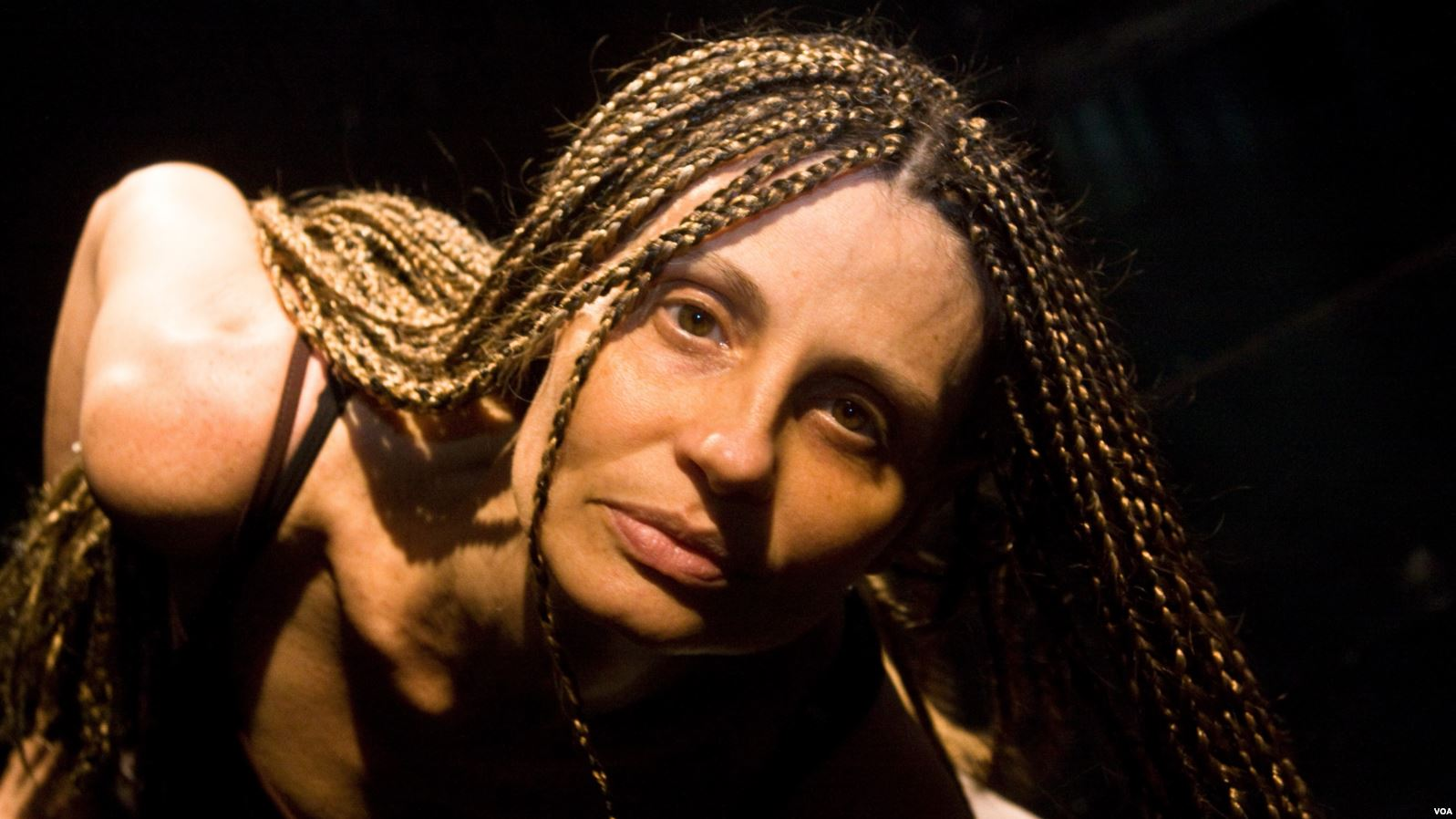
- Born: 2 November 1962 (age 63); Angola
- Education: Escola Superior de Dança de Lisboa
- Career
- Current group: Contemporary Dance Company of Angola

Ana Clara Guerra Marques (born 2 November 1962) is an Angolan dancer, dance teacher, and choreographer.

== Career ==
Marques began to learn classical dancing at the Dancing Academy of Luanda, Angola, in 1970, at the age of eight. She completed her first course to become a dance teacher in 1978, and was designated to lead the sole dancing school in the country. She worked as a professional dancer and choreographer. In 1990, she completed the dancing high course at the Escola Superior de Dança de Lisboa in Portugal and received a special degree in pedagogy. She has a master's degree in Artistic Performance Dance, and is a member of the International Dance Council.

In 1991, she set up the first professional dance company in Angola, the Contemporary Dance Company of Angola. In 1995, she was given the IDENTITY prize by the Union of Artists and Composers (UNAC). In 2006 she received the Diploma of Honor from the Angolan Ministry of Culture and the National Prize for Arts in the Dance category, for her contribution in the fields of education, artistic creation, research and culture of Angola. As an official of the Angolan Ministry of Education and Culture, she contributes to the conception and elaboration of academic programs.

Her choreographic works include A propósito de Lueji, Mea Culpa, Imagem & Movimento, Uma Frase qualquer… and Outras (frases). Her choreography is based on traditional and popular dances from different regions of Angola. Her work is noted for its social criticism, as seen in Palmas, Por Favor!, Neste País…, Agora não dá! ‘Tou a Bumbar… and Os Quadros do Verso Vetusto. She also introduced inclusive dance to Angola by integrating disabled and non-disabled dancers in the productions of the Contemporary Dance Company of Angola.

== Sources ==
- Outras Frases (vídeo documentary), 52’, col. / p/b, Jorge António, 2003 (C.F. www.imdb.com / search:www.fnac.pt)
- MARQUES, A. C., TAVARES, R. (2003). A Companhia de Dança Contemporânea de Angola. Lisboa: Mukixe e Caxinde Editora.
