= Alis Guggenheim =

Swiss painter and sculptor

- Born: 8 March 1896; Lengnau, Switzerland
- Died: 2 September 1958 (aged 62); Zürich, Switzerland
- Known for: Painting
- Partner: Mischa Berson

Alis Guggenheim (8 March 1896 – 2 September 1958) was a Swiss painter, and sculptor.

== Biography ==
She born in Lengnau and who died in Zurich. Daughter of Moses Guggenheim and Fanny Guggenheim-Weil. Sister of Hilda, Bona, Martha, Hermann, Jacques and Daniel. She was the mother of Ruth Guggenheim Heussler (born Moscow 1920, died Zürich, 2009) and the grandmother of Olivia Heussler (born 1957 in Zürich) and Delia Heussler, (born 1955 in Zürich, died 1987, Manhattan, New York).

In 1916 Guggenheim opened a fashion house in Zürich, called the Salon des Modes. She met a Russian student and communist named Mischa Berson with whom she travelled to the Soviet Union at the beginning of 1919. There she worked as a seamstress and became a member of the Communist Party. In 1920 she gave birth to her daughter, Ruth Guggenheim Heussler 1920–2009.

Following the failure of her relationship with Berson, Guggenheim returned to Switzerland, re-opened her salon and joined the Swiss Communist Party. Among her acquaintances in Zurich were Richard Paul Lohse, Karl Geiser, Max Bill, Albert Ehrismann and Max Raphael. In 1924 her fashion house became a studio as she began to work as a sculptor. The same year she participated in her first exhibition. In 1942 she moved to Muzzano in the Swiss canton of Ticino. There she cultivated her friendship with authors Lisa Tetzner and Kurt Held. In 1954 Guggenheim received the Swiss Federation of Jewish Communities Art Prize. Thereafter she held her first solo exhibition in Zurich, which was a financial success.

Her work has been purchased by city, state and federal government bodies. She was best known for her paintings. Alis Guggenheim died in 1958, following a brief illness, and was buried in the Jewish cemetery in Lengnau.

Some of her works are on display at the Jewish Museum of Switzerland, the Aargauer Kunsthaus, and in the Israel Museum in Jerusalem.

== Literature ==
- "Als ob ich selber nackt in Schnee und Regen stehe..." : Susanne Gisel-Pfankuch: "Alis Guggenheim" in German, French and Italian in the online Historical Dictionary of Switzerland.Verlag Lars Müller, Baden
