= Jack and White =

US musical group

- Origin: Los Angeles, California, U.S.
- Genres: Indie pop, pop, alternative rock
- Years active: 2011–present
- Label: June Baby Records
- Members: Jack Matranga; Brooke White
- Website: jackandwhite.com

Jack and White is an American indie pop duo consisting of singer-songwriters Jack Matranga and 2008 American Idol finalist Brooke White. The band's debut EP, Gemini, was independently released on June Baby Records in August 2011. The band's first single, "Double Trouble", was selected as the iTunes Single of the Week for the week of August 23, 2011.

== History ==
Jack Matranga and Brooke White first met when the two were blindly set up to co-write a song for what would become White's next solo album. Matranga and White came from two very different backgrounds. Matranga was born and raised in Sacramento, California and played guitar in the nationally touring band Self Against City. They released an EP and a full-length album on Drive-Thru Records before disbanding in 2008. White grew up in Mesa, Arizona playing piano by ear from a young age. She began singing at age 16 and moved to Los Angeles to pursue a career in music. She released one independent album before earning a golden ticket for the show American Idol. White placed 5th on Season 7 of the show and went on to release a second solo album in 2009.

Matranga and White got together for the first time at Brooke's Van Nuys, California home on February 1, 2011 and penned the song "Feathers" on that first day. Shortly thereafter, Brooke cancelled all of her upcoming writing sessions and Jack and White was born.

=== Gemini ===
The new duo got together several times over the next two months and wrote five more songs for what would become their debut EP Gemini. In May 2011 White and Matranga began recording in friend, composer and producer Danny Cocke's home studio. White and Matranga co-produced the EP with Cocke, who also engineered and mixed the six songs. Friend, and former Self Against City drummer Justin Barnes played drums on the recording. Photographer Trever Hoehne took the first batch of photos of the duo, and White designed the EP artwork. Gemini was released on August 23, 2011, exclusively on iTunes for the first week, and Jack and White's first single "Double Trouble" was selected as the iTunes "Single of the Week". The EP was released everywhere else digitally on August 30, 2011.

=== Winter ===
Writing for Jack And White's second EP, Winter, began on the day Gemini was released, when White and Matranga penned the song "Night After Night" before an interview with James Barone of Sacramento's Submerge Magazine. Over the next three months, the two got together to write three additional tunes. White and Matranga would often write at Balboa Park in Van Nuys, California, the middle point between White's new home in Ventura County and Jack's home in Silverlake. "Bright Side of the Bad News" was spawned from a Balboa park writing session. Winter was recorded entirely in White's house, engineered by Matranga and produced and mixed by the duo themselves. Adam Culvey, who also performs drums live with the band, performed drums on the EP. The four song EP was released on January 24, 2012, exclusive to iTunes for the first week and includes a bonus track of a live version "Telephone Games" from the Gemini EP.

=== Undercover ===
Jack and White recorded and released a six-song covers EP, covering songs from each decade beginning with the 1960s. The EP included covers of The Mamas & the Papas "California Dreamin'", Electric Light Orchestra's "Telephone Line", Eurythmics' "Here Comes the Rain Again", Third Eye Blind's "How's It Going to Be", Justin Timberlake's "Cry Me a River" and The Black Keys "Tighten Up". The first single, "California Dreamin'", was released on May 15, with the entire EP becoming available everywhere digitally on June 5. The band's cover of "Telephone Line" features Michael Fitzpatrick from Fitz and the Tantrums. The band released music videos for "California Dreamin'", "Telephone Line" and "How's It Going to Be".

=== Touring ===
The first show performed by White and Matranga together was actually a Brooke White show in Provo, Utah on June 24, 2011. White had a previously booked engagement that Matranga accompanied her on to debut some of the new Jack And White songs ahead of the EP release. The first official Jack And White show was in Echo Park (Los Angeles, California) at Lot 1 Cafe on June 30, 2011. In October 2011, Jack And White teamed up with Hard Rock Cafe for Breast Cancer Awareness month. The band performed at three of the Hard Rock Cafe locations including Denver, Phoenix and Hollywood. In 2011 the duo toured the western United States several times playing in California, Utah, Idaho, Arizona and Nevada.

== Members ==
- Jack Matranga (Vocals, Electric guitar, Acoustic guitar)
- Brooke White (Vocals, Acoustic guitar)

=== Live members ===
- Adam Culvey (Drums, Percussion, Vocals)
- Kevin Haaland (Bass guitar)

=== Former members ===
- Danny Cocke (Bass guitar)

== Discography ==
=== Extended plays ===
Title	Details	Peak chart positions	
Title	Details	US Indie	US Digital
Gemini	Release date: August 23, 2011; Label: June Baby Records; Format: digital download, CD	36	61
Winter	Release date: January 24, 2012; Label: June Baby Records; Format: digital download, CD	43	83
Undercover	Release date: June 5, 2012; Label: June Baby Records; Format: digital download	—	—
Lost	Released: November 13, 2015; Label: June Baby Records; Format: digital download	—	—

=== Singles ===
Year	Single	Album
2011	"Double Trouble"	Gemini
2012	"Night After Night"	Winter
2012	"XYZ"	Winter
2012	"California Dreamin"	Undercover
2012	"Telephone Line" featuring Fitz	Undercover

=== Music videos ===
Year	Title	Album
2011	"Double Trouble"	Gemini
2012	"Night After Night"	Winter
2012	"XYZ"	Winter
2012	"California Dreamin"	Undercover
2012	"Telephone Line" featuring Fitz	Undercover
2012	"How's It Going to Be"	Undercover
