= High Hopes & Heartbreak =

Studio album by Brooke White
- Released: July 14, 2009
- Genre: Folk-pop
- Label: June Baby
- Producer: Dave Cobb

Brooke White chronology
Songs from the Attic (2005)	High Hopes & Heartbreak (2009)

Singles from High Hopes & Heartbreak
- 1. "Hold Up My Heart" Released: February 25, 2009; 2. "Radio Radio" Released: June 23, 2009

High Hopes and Heartbreak is the first post-American Idol album from seventh season American Idol fifth-place finisher Brooke White. The album was executive produced by Idol judge Randy Jackson.

The album was initially released exclusively on iTunes on July 14, 2009 in a digital format. The physical release of the album was July 21, 2009, the following week.

== Background ==
On January 31, White she said she signed with Sanctuary Artist Group instead of earlier reported Sanctuary Records. She also announced the title of her new album, High Hopes & Heartbreak. White announced May 2009 that she started her own record label "June Baby Records" with Randy Jackson, and her first post-Idol album, High Hopes & Heartbreak, would be available July 21, 2009.

The album was originally supposed to be available June 2, 2009, also White's birthday, but was postponed to release a little more than a month later, as said in White's blog entry for May 15. The digital release date of album is July 14, one week earlier than its physical release.

The album was executive produced by "American Idol" judge Randy Jackson, who has never executive produced an album for any of the contestants from "Idol" before.

The album is released through June Baby Records, a new indie label formed by White, Jackson and Carl Stubner (Head of Sanctuary Artist Management).

In its first week of release, the album sold 10,000 copies as a digital download.

== Singles ==
- Hold Up My Heart

"Hold Up My Heart" is the first single of the album. On February 25, White premiered the song on season 8 of American Idol. That same week, the song sold 51,171 copies digitally. The song debuted at number 47.

- Radio Radio

"Radio Radio" is the second single of the album. It was released on June 23. A music video was filmed and released for "Radio Radio."

== Critical reception ==
Professional ratings
Review scores
Source	Rating
Allmusic	3.5/5 stars
Boston Herald	(B)
Entertainment Weekly	(B)
Herald Dispatch	(favorable)
Houston Chronicle	3.5/4 stars
Miami Herald	3/5 stars
Salt Lake Tribune	(B)
Slant Magazine	2.5/5 stars
Star Tribune	(favorable)

High Hopes & Heartbreak received generally favorable reviews. The Los Angeles Times described the album as a "hopeful mix of summer songs" noting White's "easy-vintage style." Howard Cohen, of the Miami Herald, mentioned White's "easygoing 70s vibe" and described it as "engaging...an easy feeling to take on the road." Allmusic also praised the record, describing it as "a sweet, likeable album that largely follows through on White's Idol promise."

Salt Lake Tribune writer Tom Wharton called it "a worthy first effort." The Herald Dispatch deemed the album, "A breezy, pleasant surprise." Entertainment Weekly featured the album on its Extended Play section, and described the only cover on the album, "Use Somebody", originally by Kings of Leon, as an "unexpected highlight" of a "lovely soul-folk take." The Houston Chronicle wrote that, "At its frequent best, HH&H captures the conviction White brought to several of her best Idol performances...she's consistently lovely — the alt-country vibe of Little Bird, the heartbreaking Smile, the surprising disco-swirl of the title track...poignant songs like Hold Up My Heart, Sometimes Love and Be Careful deserve to find an audience beyond Idol fanatics."

== Track listing ==
CD
No.	Title	Music	Length
1.	"Radio Radio"	Brooke White, Dave Cobb	3:35
2.	"Hold Up My Heart"	White, Cobb	3:49
3.	"Out of the Ashes"	White, Steve McEwan	3:11
4.	"Phoenix"	White, Cobb	4:45
5.	"When We Were One"	White, Rune Westberg	3:59
6.	"Use Somebody"	Kings of Leon	4:12
7.	"Smile"	White, Tom Douglas	4:03
8.	"Little Bird"	White, Cobb, Michael Johns	3:44
9.	"High Hopes & Heartbreak"	White, Cobb	4:20
10.	"Sometimes Love"	White, Kelley Lovelace	3:11
11.	"California Song"	White, Amy Foster, Ben Glover	4:12
12.	"Be Careful"	White, McEwan	2:32

== Personnel ==
- Dave Cobb - bass guitar, bells, clapping, acoustic guitar, electric guitar, percussion, string pads, xylophone
- Tom Douglas - keyboards
- Ana Lenchantin - cello
- Fred Mandel - Hammond organ, piano, synthesizer strings, synthesizer, Wurlitzer
- Steve McEwan - acoustic guitar, background vocals
- Sal Oliveri - synthesizer strings
- Chris Powell - drums, percussion
- Wes Precourt - violin
- Rune Westberg - acoustic guitar, electric guitar, keyboards, percussion
- Brooke White - bells, clapping, piano, lead vocals, background vocals, Wurlitzer

== Charts ==
Chart (2009)	Peak position
US Billboard 200	50
US Independent Albums	7
US Digital Albums	7
