= Allis =

Allis may refer to:

== People ==
- Allis (surname)

== Places ==
- Allis Township, Michigan
- North Allis Township, Michigan
- West Allis, Wisconsin

== Other ==
- Allis-Chalmers, a former manufacturer of farm equipment based in Milwaukee, Wisconsin
- Big Allis, a giant generator in Queens, New York, commissioned by Consolidated Edison and built by Allis-Chalmers in 1965
- Allis-Chalmers Model B, popular tractor manufactured by Allis-Chalmers
- Charles Allis Art Museum, in Milwaukee, Wisconsin
- Allis shad, Alosa alosa, species of fish found in Europe and North Africa
- Fiatallis, manufacturer of construction equipment
- Allis clamp, a vital surgical instrument used in many surgical procedures

== See also ==
- Alliss
- Alis (disambiguation)
- Alice (disambiguation)
