= Lizza =

Lizza may refer to:

People

- Lizza Danila (b. 1982), former Filipino swimmer
- Ryan Lizza (b. 1974), American journalist

Other

- Lizza di Piastreta, a former industrial monorail used for a marble quarry near Massa, Italy
- Santo Stefano alla Lizza, a church in Siena, Italy

== See also ==
- Liza (disambiguation)
- Lizzano (disambiguation)
- Lizzana (Garganega), a variety of white Italian wine grape
