= Lizzano =

Lizzano may refer to a pair of Italian municipalities:

- Lizzano, Apulia, in the province of Taranto, Apulia.
- Lizzano in Belvedere, in the Metropolitan City of Bologna, Emilia-Romagna.

See also

- Lizzana (Garganega), a variety of white Italian wine grape
- Lizza (disambiguation)
