= Guerra (disambiguation) =

Guerra is a surname.

Guerra (war in Spanish, Portuguese and Italian) may also refer to:

== Places ==
- Donato Guerra, State of Mexico, a municipality in Mexico
- Guerra, Texas
- Juan Guerra District, district of the province San Martín in Peru
- San Antonio de Guerra, a municipality (municipio) of the Santo Domingo province in the Dominican Republic
- Vargas Guerra District, district of the province Ucayali in Peru

== Buildings ==
- Casa de la Guerra, residence of the fifth commandant of the Presidio de Santa Barbara, José de la Guerra y Noriega from 1828 until his death in 1858
- Paseo de la Guerra, complex of historic buildings in downtown Santa Barbara, California

== Military ==
- Croce di Guerra
- Ifni War (Guerra Ignorada)
- Reform War (Guerra de Reforma)
- Uruguayan Civil War (Guerra Grande)
- Guerra a muerte, term used in Chilean historiography to describe the irregular, no-quarter warfare that broke out from 1819 to 1821 during the Chilean War of Independence.
- Guerra, a type of corvette used by the Spanish

== Entertainment ==
- A guerra dos mascates, a novel written by the Brazilian writer José de Alencar
- Guerra de la Paz, composite name of Cuban born, American artist duo Alain Guerra (born 1968) and Neraldo de la Paz
- Guerra de Titanes, a major annual professional wrestling event in Mexico promoted by the Asistencia Asesoría y Administración (AAA) promotion.
- La guerra gaucha (novel)
- La Guerra Gaucha, 1942 Argentine historical drama and epic film

=== Music ===
- Dalla guerra amorosa (HWV 102), a dramatic secular cantata for either bass (HWV 102a) or soprano (HWV 102b) written by Georg Frideric Handel
- Declare Guerra, the fourth album by Brazilian rock band Barão Vermelho
- Depois da Guerra, the tenth album by Oficina G3
- Guerra Gaucha, the eighth album of Enanitos Verdes published in 1996.
- Guerra de Estados Pesados, compilation album, which compiles music from performers from six different states of Mexico
- "La Guerra" (song)

== Sport ==
- Guerra (cycling team)
