= Elisa =

Elisa may refer to:

== Arts and entertainment ==
=== Film and television ===
- Elisa (1959 TV series), a Mexican telenovela
- Elisa (1979 TV series), a Mexican telenovela
- Élisa (1957 film), a French historical drama
- Élisa (1995 film), starring Gérard Depardieu and Vanessa Paradis

=== Music ===
- Elisa (Japanese singer) (born 1989), Japanese singer and model
- Elisa (Italian singer) (Elisa Toffoli, born 1977), Italian singer and songwriter
- Eliza (Cherubini), or Elisa, a 1794 opera by Cherubini
- "Elisa", a song by Serge Gainsbourg from the album Jane Birkin/Serge Gainsbourg (1969)

== People ==
- Elisa (given name), including a list of people with the name
- Subcomandante Elisa (born 1955), Zapatista activist

== Other uses ==
- Elisa, Argentina, town in Santa Fe Province, Argentina
- ELISA (enzyme-linked immunosorbent assay), a biochemical technique
- Elisa (company), a Finnish telecommunications company
- ELISA (satellite), a French military satellite series
- eLISA, a development of the Laser Interferometer Space Antenna
- Elisa, an open source music player that is a part of KDE Gear

== See also ==
- Elissa (disambiguation)
- Elise (disambiguation)
- Eliza (disambiguation)
- Alisa (disambiguation)
- Lisa (disambiguation)
- Para Elisa, a 2013 Spanish-language thriller film
