= Liza =

Liza may refer to:

- Liza (name), including a list of people named Liza
- Liza, a former genus of mullets, now split into Chelon, Mugil and Planiliza
- Liza (1972 film), a 1972 Italian film
- Liza (1978 film), a 1978 Malayalam horror film
- Liza: A Truly Terrific Absolutely True Story, a 2024 documentary about the life of Liza Minnelli
- Hurricane Liza (disambiguation), the name of four tropical cyclones in the Eastern Pacific Ocean
- "Liza (All the Clouds'll Roll Away)", a 1929 song by George Gershwin, Ira Gershwin and Gus Kahn
- Zapadnaya Liza, a river in northern Russia near Murmansk
- Liza Alert, a nonprofit search-and-rescue volunteer organization
- "Liza", a song by NOFX from Heavy Petting Zoo

== See also ==
- Eliza (disambiguation)
- Lizza (disambiguation)
- Lisa (disambiguation)
