= Judith Hermann =

German author (born 1970)

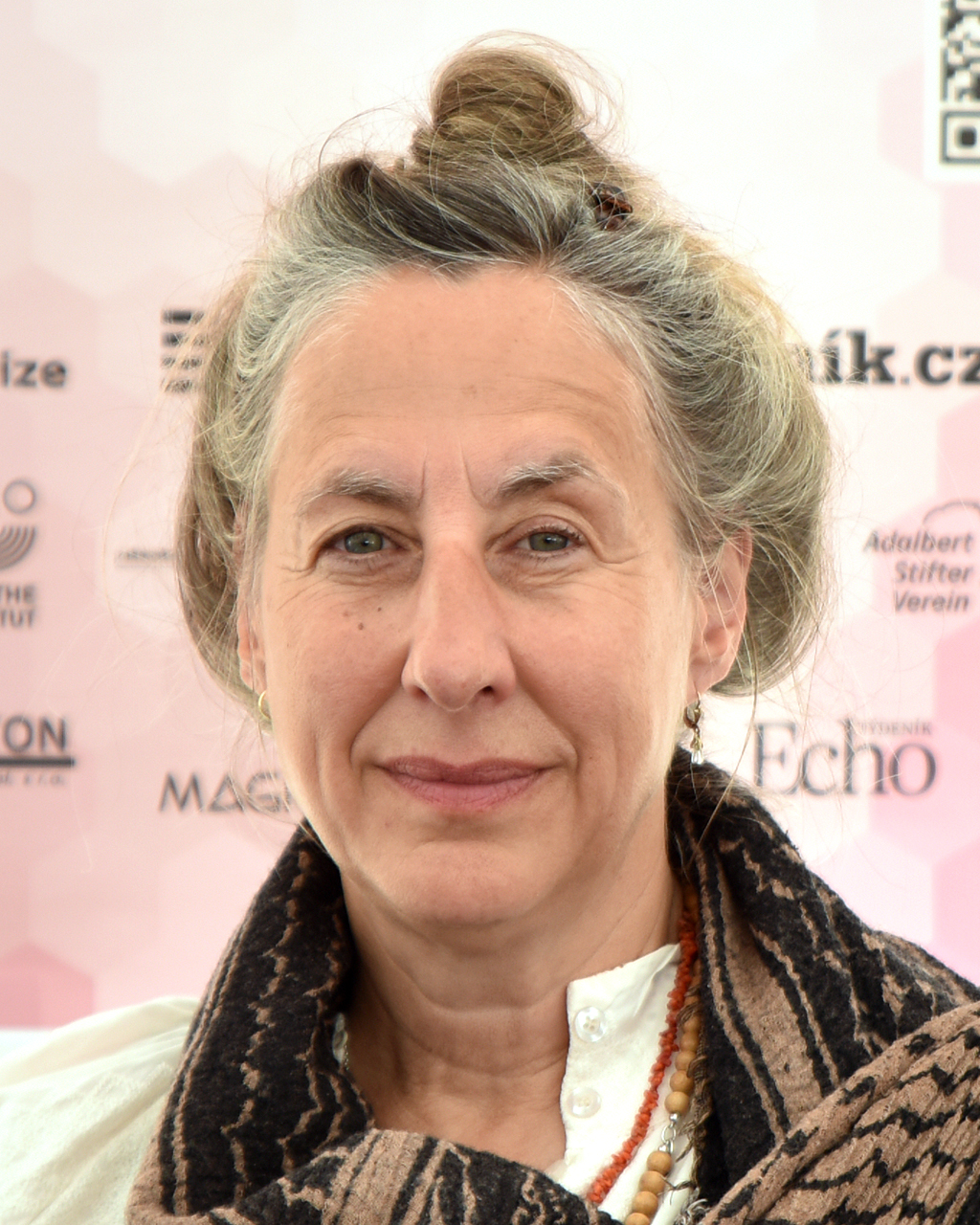
- Hermann in 2024
- Born: 15 May 1970 (age 56); West Berlin, West Germany
- Occupation: Writer
- Writing career
- Period: late 20th-early 21st century
- Genres: short stories and the novel
- Notable works: Sommerhaus, später (1997)
- Notable awards: Kleist Prize; 2001; Erich Fried Prize; 2014

Judith Hermann (born 15 May 1970) is a German author. She has published several books of short stories and her first novel was published in 2014. She is a leading figure of the Fräuleinwunder ("girl wonder") group of women writers.

== Life ==
Hermann was born in West Berlin. She grew up in the West Berlin neighborhood of Neukölln and remained there until the mid-nineties, when she moved to the district of Prenzlauer Berg in the former East Berlin.

She holds a master's degree in German and Philosophy and attended the Berliner Journalistenschule, a highly selective professional academy for journalists. During this training, she did an internship with the German language newspaper Aufbau in New York. While she was in America she worked on some of her first literary texts and realized that short stories were "her" genre. In an interview, she explained that her training as a journalist helped her to write concisely, although she knew that journalism was not suitable for her.

After returning to Berlin, she worked briefly as a free-lance journalist before she was awarded the Alfred-Döblin stipend from the Academy of Arts, Berlin in 1997. Recipients of this stipend are financed for three to twelve months while they live and work in the Alfred-Döblin House in Wewelsfleth.

In 1998 her first volume of short stories, Sommerhaus, später, was celebrated by critics, who felt they had discovered in her work the "sound of a new generation" (Spiegel 12/1999). Hermann quickly became a leading figure of the Fräuleinwunder ("miracle of the young women"), a term coined by German literary critic Volker Hage of Spiegel that grouped together female authors like Jenny Erpenbeck, Felicitas Hoppe, Zoe Jenny, Juli Zeh and Julia Franck who were gaining success at the time. Although "Fräulein" is an old-fashioned term, not politically correct, and rejected by the authors themselves, the term worked well as a marketing tool and has been adopted in Literary Criticism. Judith Hermann received both the Hugo Ball Prize and the Bremer Literatur-Förderpreis. In 2001 she was awarded the Kleist Prize.

Her second collection of stories, Nichts als Gespenster, followed in 2003, but to some extent was unable to fulfill the high expectations of critics. In 2009, her latest collection of short stories, Alice, was published. Alice comprises five connected stories about the death of five men, each story sharing a common protagonist, Alice. Iris Radisch, a famous critic for the German weekly newspaper Die Zeit titled her review of Hermann's book "Das große Männersterben" (The death of many men). Despite the melancholic subject, these stories are also about life must go on after death. In this respect, Alice is different from Hermann's earlier works, which had a much darker tone.

Hermann's first novel Aller Liebe Anfang, was published in 2014. It depicts a stalking scenario, in which the protagonist Stella is terrorized by a neighbor, Mister Pfister, when she is alone in her home during the day while her husband and daughter are at work and school. Mister Pfister appears one day on Stella's doorstep, wishing to speak with her and, after being denied, becomes fixated on her, leaving increasingly encroaching and aggressive messages in her mailbox and threatening to destroy her quiet family life. Hermann's novel is chilling, in part because of the restrained language she employs and in part because the stalking scenario nods to contemporary social fears about security and vulnerability.

== Works ==
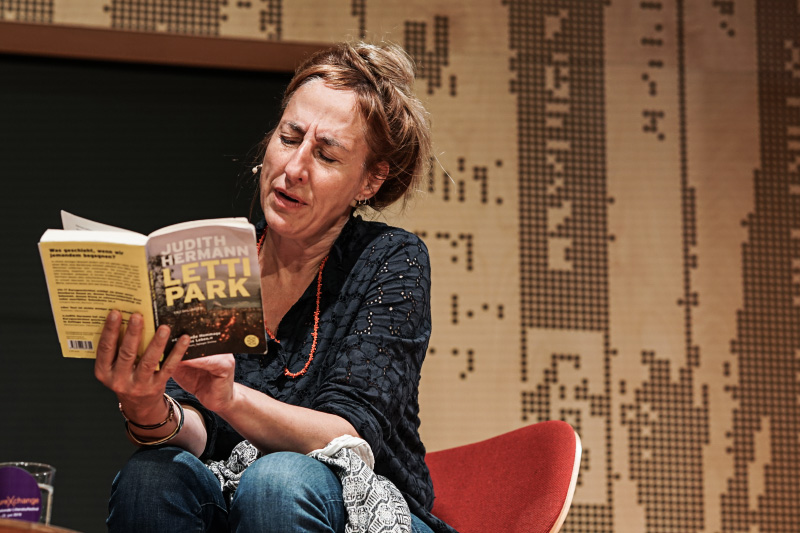
Judith Hermann at LiteratureXchange Festival (2019) in Aarhus, Denmark

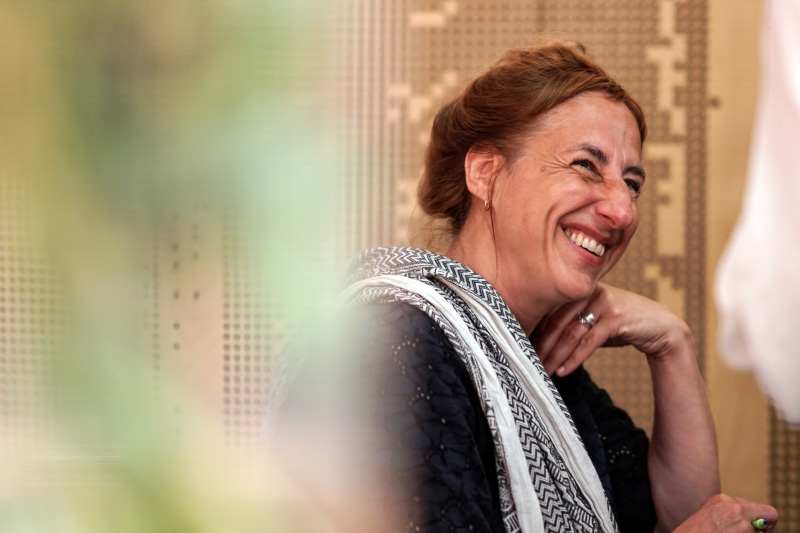
Aarhus, Denmark (2019)

- Sommerhaus, später (1998, S. Fischer) ISBN 3-596-14770-0
  - Summerhouse, later (2001, HarperCollins) ISBN 0-06-000686-2
- Nichts als Gespenster (2003, S. Fischer) ISBN 3-596-15798-6
  - Nothing but Ghosts (2005, Fourth Estate) ISBN 0-00-717455-1
- Alice (2009, S. Fischer) ISBN 978-3-10-033182-3
  - Alice (2011, Profile) ISBN 978-1-84765-747-3
- Aller Liebe Anfang. novel (2014, S. Fischer) ISBN 978-3-10-033183-0
  - Where Love Begins (2016, Clerkwell) ISBN 978-1-78125-470-7
- Lettipark. short stories (2016, S. Fischer) ISBN 978-3-10-403716-5
  - Letti Park. (2018, Clerkenwell Press) ISBN 978-1-78125-840-8
- Daheim. novel (2021, S. Fischer) ISBN 978-3-10-397035-7
- Wir hätten uns alles gesagt novel (2023) ISBN 978-3-10-397510-9
  - We Would Have Told Each Other Everything (2025, Granta) ISBN 978-1-73853-620-7

== Films ==
- Eisblumenfarm (based on "Sommerhaus, später"), Short-film by Dominik Betz (2004); with Philip Hellmann, Sara Hilliger, Gunnar Solka
- Freundinnen, Short-film by Tobias Stille (2005); with Anneke Kim Sarnau, Regina Stötzel, Murat Yilmaz OCLC 315329179
- Nichts als Gespenster, Drama by Martin Gypkens (2006); with August Diehl, Chiara Schoras, Fritzi Haberlandt OCLC 699111789

== Awards ==
- 1999 Förderpreis Bremen Literature Prize
- 1999 Hugo-Ball-Förderpreis
- 2001 Kleist-Preis
- 2009 Friedrich-Hölderlin-Preis
- 2014 Erich Fried Prize
- 2018 Blixenprisen for Lettipark
- 2021 Rheingau Literatur Preis for Daheim
- 2022 Bremen Literature Prize for Daheim
