= Alis (given name) =

Alis is a given name. Notable people with the name include:

- Alis (singer), Albanian singer
- Alis Boçi (born 1991), Albanian footballer
- Alis Guggenheim (1903–1982), Swiss painter
- Alis Kaplandjyan, Armenian actress
- Alis Lesley (born 1938), American rockabilly singer
- Alis Vidūnas (born 1934), Lithuanian politician
- Alis Landale, fictional character in Phantasy Star
- Alis Wen (c. 1520–?), 16th-century Welsh poet
