= Hold Up My Heart =

Single by Brooke White

from the album High Hopes & Heartbreak
- Released: February 25, 2009
- Genre: Indie pop
- Length: 3:53
- Songwriter(s): Brooke White; David W. Cobb

Brooke White singles chronology
"Hold Up My Heart" (2009)	"Radio Radio" (2009)

"Hold Up My Heart" is the first single from American Idol seventh season contestant Brooke White's post-Idol album, High Hopes & Heartbreak. It was released on iTunes on February 25, 2009. White performed the song on the second results show of the eighth season of American Idol. It debuted at number 47 on the U.S. Billboard Hot 100.

== Charts ==
Chart (2009)	Peak position
U.S. Billboard Hot 100	47
