= Alise Alousi =

Iraqi American poet living in Detroit

- أليس الآلوسي
- Born: 1965 (age 60–61)
- Education: Wayne State University
- Occupation: Poet

Alise Alousi (Arabic: أليس الآلوسي; born 1965) is an Iraqi American poet living in Detroit. She was formerly a program director at Alternatives for Girls, a local program to keep vulnerable girls and young women from dropping out of school, street activity and other risky activities. She was born in 1965. Her mother is from Detroit, Michigan and her father is from Baghdad, Iraq. She attended school at Wayne State University and studied creative writing and literature. Born to an Iraqi father, Alousi still has relatives in Iraq.

As an Arab American poet, Alousi is also Director of School & Community Partnerships at InsideOut Literary Arts, a creative writing program serving Detroit's youth. Her work has recently appeared in Inclined to Speak: An Anthology of Contemporary Arab American Poetry and will appear in Mutanabbi Street Starts Here late in 2009. She also has contributed to We Are Iraqis: Aesthetics and Politics in a Time of War published in 2012. She received a grant from the Knight Foundation in 2015 for her work pairing recent Iraqi women refugees with artists and writers in order to share their stories through photography and essay.

She is a member of Women in Black in Detroit and serves on the board of Radius of Arab American Writers.

== Works ==
- What to Count
- Alley of Thieves
- In Baghdad
