= Alice (1897 tugboat) =

1897 steamboat in United States

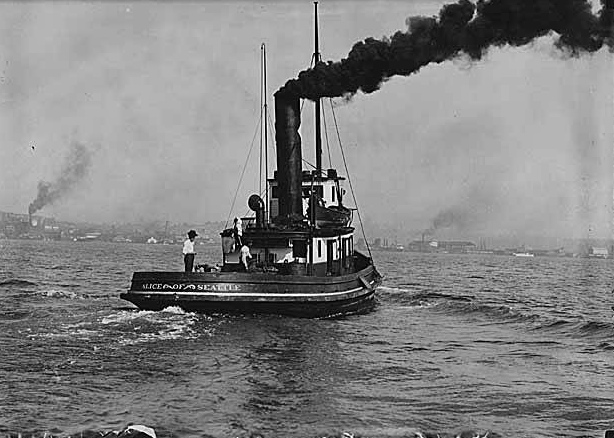
- Alice operating as steam tug, sometime between 1921 and 1930.

History
- Name: Alice (1897-1941; Simon Foss (1941-1963)
- Route: Puget Sound, Alaska
- Completed: 1897; rebuilt 1930
- Out of service: 1963
- Fate: Demolished

General characteristics
- Type: inland steamboat; rebuilt as steam then diesel tug
- Tonnage: 55 gross tons (as built)
- Length: 65 ft (19.81 m)
- Installed power: steam engine; after 1930 135 hp (101 kW) diesel engine.
- Crew: Mark Hargitt, Gina Curwick

Alice was a Puget Sound steam passenger ship built in 1897. Alice was later rebuilt into a steam tug, and later converted to diesel power and renamed Simon Foss. As a tug, the vessel was in service until 1963. This vessel should not be confused with the similarly designed vessel Alice, built in 1892, which later became Foss 18.

== Career ==
Alice was built at Tacoma, Washington for Capt. Bradford, who then put the vessel on the route between Tacoma and North Bay. Alice replaced the steamer Susie on the run, with Susie then being sold to a Fairhaven concern, Franco-American Canning Company, for use as a cannery tender.

In 1900, Bradford sold Alice to the Petersberg Packing Co. and Alice was transferred north to Alaska, where the vessel served for over 20 years. In 1902, Alice was rebuilt as a cannery tender and put into operation purchased out of Juneau by the Todd Packing Co. Alice was then returned to Puget Sound, and served as a steam tug for Delta V. Smyth Towing Company.

== Rebuild ==
In 1930, Delta V. Smyth did an extensive rebuild of the Alice at Olympia, Washington, and converted the vessel to diesel power. The installed engine was rated at 135 horsepower (101 kW).

== Tugboat Annie race ==
In 1932, Alice was featured along with a number of other Puget Sound tugboats in the feature film Tugboat Annie. The film, which was based on a fictionalized version of the life of Thea Foss, starred the then very popular comedic actress Marie Dressler (1865–1934) in the title role. The film required a staged tugboat "race", which was won by the Peter Foss, under the command of Capt. Arthur Hopstead, to whom Marie Dressler personally presented the Tugboat Annie Trophy. Alice was commanded in the race by Capt. Harold Nelson.

== Purchase by Foss ==
In 1941, Delta V. Smyth sold Alice to Foss Launch and Tug Co., which renamed the vessel as the Simon Foss. As Simon Foss the vessel remained in active service until 1963.

== Disposition ==
In 1963 marine historian Gordon R. Newell bought Simon Foss from the Foss concern, and had the vessel beached at Olympia. He changed the name back to Alice and stated that the vessel would be used as "editorial headquarters for the preparation of the Marine History of the Pacific Northwest. Alice was then purchased by the Hargitt family and moved to Anacortes, Washington where she is currently gathering the funding to be restored to her former glory. After several sinkings in her berth, and several repairs made to keep her afloat, she eventually was demolished . Her wheelhouse was saved however.
