= Alice (painting) =

Painting by Amedeo Modigliani

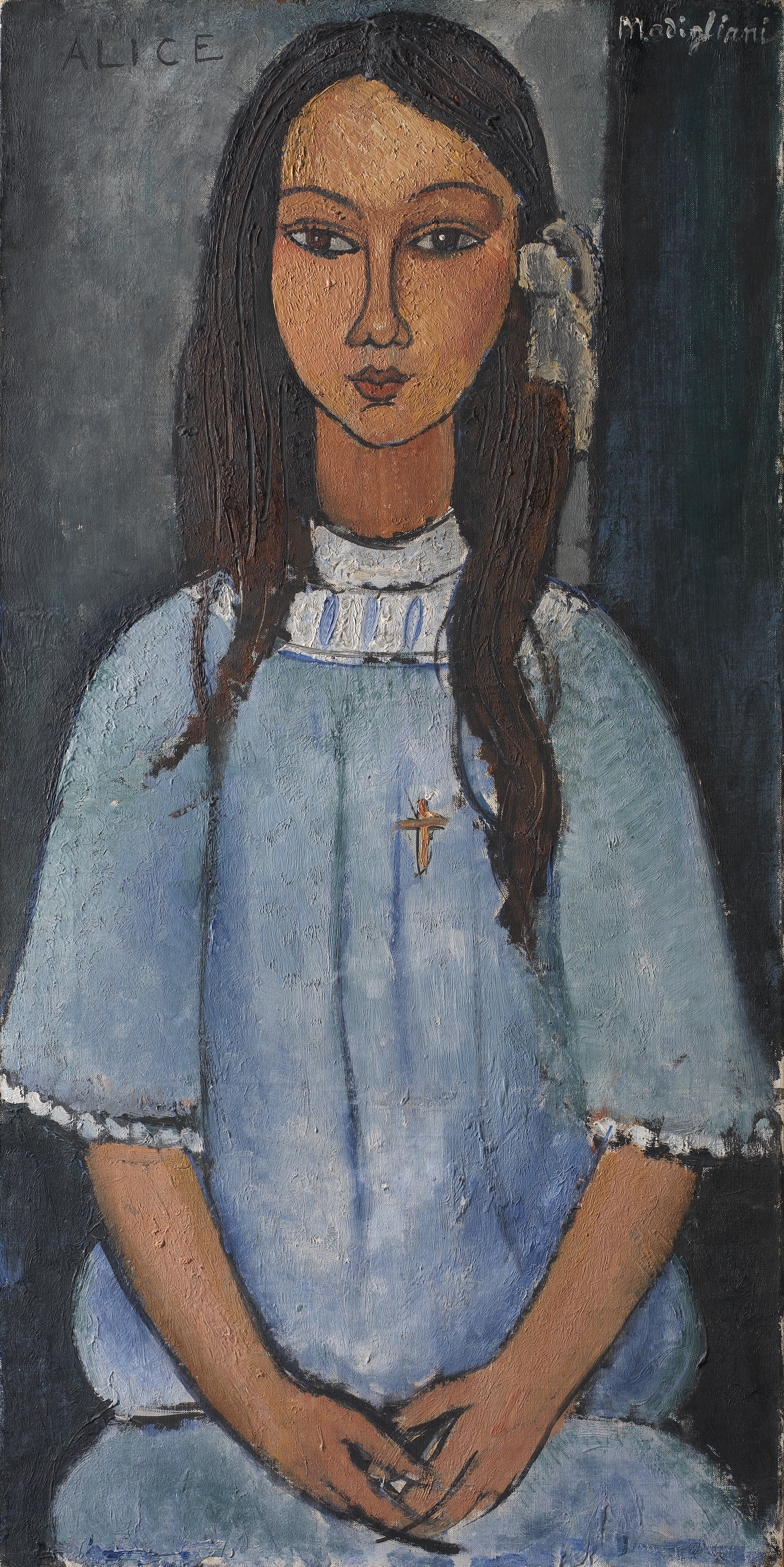
- Year: c. 1918
- Dimensions: 78.5 cm (30.9 in) × 39 cm (15 in)
- Location: National Gallery of Denmark

Alice is a c.1918 oil on canvas painting by Amedeo Modigliani. It now hangs in the National Gallery of Denmark, in Copenhagen, to which it was donated in 1928.

== Description and analysis ==
Modigliani painted more than 300 portraits between 1915 and 1920. Alice is the portrait of a young girl seated, dressed in a blue Sunday dress with a gold cross upon her chest. She looks directly at the viewer with her large almond-shaped eyes. Her brown hair frames her face and falls onto her dress. The girl's face is stylized as an African mask. The canvas is simple, on a color leve, since the color scheme varies from nuances of blue to terracotta, creating a contrast that gives life to the painting without disturbing the overall impression of a classical silence and harmony.

Modigliani favoured elongated, vertical forms, which can be clearly seen in his sculptures before World War I, and in several of his portraits, like the portrait of Alice. Her head is egg-shaped and her neck does have cylinder-like form. The elongated silhouette of the girl is further emphasized by the vertical size of the canvas. The non-classical ideal of proportions is based on the works of the mannerist painter Parmigianino and in masters of the Italian Renaissance, such as Sandro Botticelli.

== Sources ==
- Wayne, Kenneth. Modigliani and the artists of Montparnasse. — New York: Abrams, 2002. — С. 109.
- Nørgaard Larsen, Peter. SMK highlights: Statens Museum for Kunst. — Kbh.: Statens Museum for Kunst, 2005. — ISBN 87-90096-43-6.
