= Contemporary Dance Company of Angola =

Angolan dance group

The Contemporary Dance Company of Angola (CDC) is a professional Angolan dance group. It was founded in 1991.
