= SS Alice =

Alice was the name of a number of steamships

- SS Alice (1857), a London and South Western Railway ship
- SS Alice, an American sloop lost in the 1893 Cheniere Caminada hurricane
- SS Alice (1900), an American sternwheel paddle steamer that sank in 1906
- SS Alice (1903), a British, and later Belgian ship
- SS Alice (1941), an Ulric Thomas ship
- SS Asia (1907), renamed Asia in 1917
