= Olivia Heussler =

Swiss photographer (born 1957)

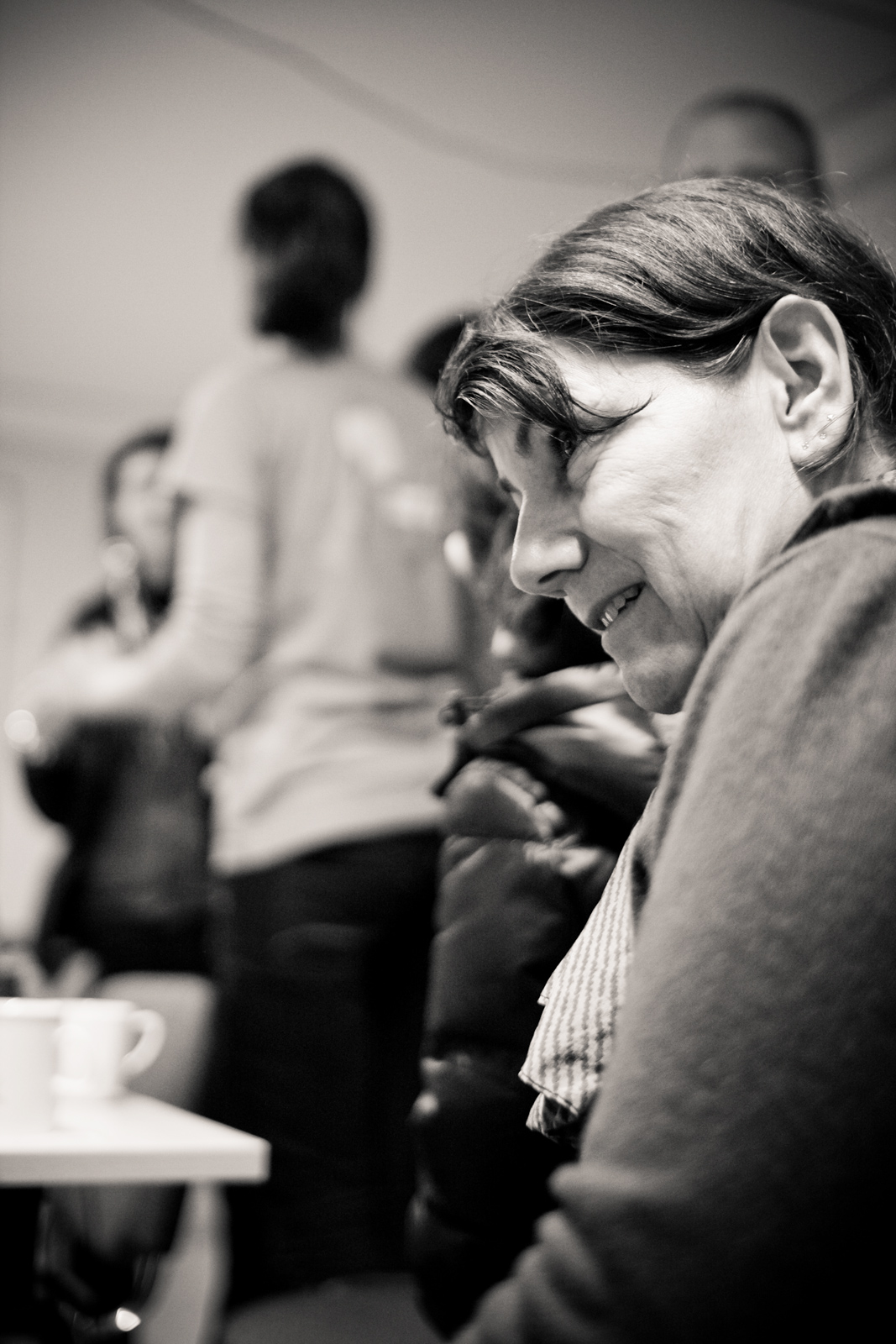
- Heussler in 2009
- Born: 1957 (age 68–69); Zurich, Switzerland
- Education: Zurich Art School
- Years active: 1980s-present
- Known for: Photography
- Notable work: Photos, Publications

Olivia Heussler (born 1957 in Zurich, Switzerland) is a Swiss photographer known for her photos of major political, historical and cultural events.

== Life and works ==
Olivia Heussler (*1957) was trained as a medical technician before becoming a photographer. She studied at Zurich art school, ZHdK as a guest student and lived in Paris on an art grant for a while. She lived in Nicaragua during the 1980s and worked in Israel, Palestine, Turkey, East and Western Europe, East-and North Africa and Pakistan. Her photo essays have depicted the Youth Movements in Zürich, Nicaragua during war and peace, the situation of the Kurds in Turkey and the Human Rights in Latin America. Her work on the Palestinian Union of Medical Relief Committees was published in Out of Jerusalem (Berne 1993), about labor in Schichtwechsel (Zürich and Bellinzona 1996), about the Gotthard mountain in: Gotthard: Das Hindernis verbindet (Zürich 2003), about Nicaragua from 1984 to 2007 in The Dream of Solentiname (Zürich 2009), about the Youth Movements in Zürich, Sommer 1980 (Zürich 2010), and El sueno de Solentiname (Nicaragua 2010). She is author of several photoessays and her work is present in public and private collections and has been exhibited widely in international Art exhibitions. She instructs students of photography and participates in forums. She lives with her daughter in Zurich, Switzerland.

== Political views and activism ==
"One doesn’t have to photograph the battlefield to show what war is. I document what these movements provoke and can depict that. Most clearly, through those concerned, on whose side I am. " (Olivia Heussler)

"As a Photographer it was also my duty to teach my subjects to take pictures themselves. … That is what I understand as development aid: give people a craft and instruction so they can work independently. And, given widespread illiteracy, photography is ideal for promoting autonomy." (Olivia Heussler)

Olivia Heussler’s philosophy is to do photojournalism as human rights work inspired by one’s own impulses, e.g. going where one feels one has to go to do one’s work. Heussler selects the locations for her travels based on her own criteria rather than current media trends. She often travels with professionals from other fields, including both international colleagues and local activists. This is the method followed in her acclaimed photojournalist series from Kurdistan, Palestine and Nicaragua.

== Solo exhibitions ==
1986 Nicaragua, Produzentengalerie, Zurich
1987 Nicaragua, Galería Fernando Gordillo, Managua
1988 Nicaragua, Nikon Live Galerie, Zurich
1991 Von Zeit zu Zeit, Galerie Mitte, Dresden
1991 Bildbruchbild, University of Zürich
1993 Out of Jerusalem, Photoforum PasquArt, Bienne
1994 Occupied women, Saint Gervais, Geneva
1995 Occupied women, Months of Photography, Bratislava
1996 Peoples in Zones of Conflict, Zafta Municipality, Haifa 1996 From time to time, Galleria La Rada, Locarno
2002 Vie de femmes, Federal office of migration, Berne
2002 Vie de femmes, Segment gallery Hofburg OSCE, Vienna
2002 Vie des femmes, United Nations Office, Vienna
2003 Via Gottardo, Leica Galerie, Bienne
2003 Via Gottardo, Museo nazionale, Ospizio San Gottardo
2009 Der Traum von Solentiname Kunstraum Winterthur
2010 Zürich, Sommer 1980, messagesalon downtown, Perla Mode, Zurich]
2014 Zurich. Photobastei Zürich
2017 Contres Pouvoirs, Halle au Blé, Altkirch, France
2019 Zurich, the 80s, Swiss Embassy, Belgrade, Serbia

== Books published in English ==
- [https://www.amazon.de/Jenseits-von-Jerusalem-Out/dp/3716508969 Jenseits von [[Jerusalem]], Out of Jerusalem]] (Exhibition in Photoforum Pasquart in Biel, 7–20 June 1993), Texts: Martin Woker, Ruchama Marton, Sumaya Farhat Naser. Translation into English: Evan Scott Porter. Ed. Esther Woerdehoff. (Text in both English and German) Bern: Benteli, 1993. ISBN 3-7165-0896-9
- 25 Years Rebuilding Lives: United Nations Voluntary Fund for Victims of Torture, Kälin, Walter. Photos by Olivia Heussler. Geneva: Office of the United Nations High Commissioner for Human Rights, 2006. ISBN 92-1-154167-0 (English), ISBN 92-1-254157-7 (French.), ISBN 92-1-354092-2 (Spanish)
- Der Traum von Solentiname/The dream of Solentiname Photography Nicaragua 1984-2007, Texts: Sergio Ramirez, Martin Heller and Olivia Heussler in German, English and a textbooklet in Spanish. 220 b/w and color pictures. Edition Patrick Frey, Zürich 2009 ISBN 978-3-905509-79-3
- ''Zürich, Summer 1980'' over 100 b/w photographs. With an essay by Stefan Zweifel, in German and English, Edition Patrick Frey, Zürich 2010 ISBN 978-3-905509-89-2
- El sueño de Solentiname/The dream of Solentiname, Photography Nicaragua 1984-2007 Texts: Sergio Ramirez, Martin Heller and Olivia Heussler in Spanish and English, 220 b/w and color pictures. UCA-IHNCA, Managua Nicaragua 2010 ISBN 978-99924-986-4-4

== Examples of photojournalist work by subtitle ==
In The Face of Human Rights the following photos by Olivia Heussler can be found:

Prohibition of discrimination: Czech Republic, Brno, 1992: "Death for Gipsies!" (p. 109 above right), Guatemala, 1985: During a campaign by a women’s group (Grupo de Apoyo Mutuo), formed to help one another (p. 143 above), Honduras, Tegucigalpa, April 1984: Honduran military generals during a meeting (p. 143 below), Switzerland, Zurich, March 1993: Refugees from Sri Lanka learning German (p. 149), Protection of private life: Italien, Brindisi, 1992: Police raid in the quarter il Paradiso (p. 339 above), The right to work: Pakistan, Quetta, 2001: Three Hazara boys work as carpet weavers 10 hours a day, seven days a week and for $30 a month (p. 511), Nicaragua, Mulukukú, 1994: Women of the MLO (Maria Luisa Ortiz) Women’s cooperative are instructed in their carpentry workshop (p. 516), The Protection of property: Switzerland, Zurich, 1988: Allotment garden (p. 531 above), Fair trial and prohibition of torture: Turkey, Ankara, December 1990: Judge Muhittin Mihcak during a trial against three Kurdish lawyers (p. 584 below), Guatemala, Guatemala City, 1985: People standing in a public place in front of a list of missing persons (p. 605 below), Political rights and freedom of expression: Romania, Sibiu, 20 May 1990: The Roma family Mihai going to vote for the first time (p. 646), Romania, Sibiu, 20 May 1990: Romani woman Mrs Mihai is going to vote for the first time in 40 years (p. 653 above). Some more contributions in: "Kurdistan. In the Shadow of History" by Susan Meiselas, New York
