= Alice mobile robot =

The Alice microrobot.

The Alice is a very small "sugarcube" mobile robot (2x2x2cm) developed at the Autonomous Systems Lab (ASL) at the École Polytechnique Fédérale de Lausanne in Lausanne, Switzerland between 1998 and 2004. It has been part of the Institute of Robotics and Intelligent Systems (IRIS) at Swiss Federal Institute of Technology in Zürich (ETH Zurich) since 2006.

It was designed with the following goals:

- Design an intelligent mobile robot as cheap and small as possible
- Study collective behavior with a large quantity of robots
- Acquire knowledge in highly integrated intelligent system
- Provide a hardware platform for further research

== Technical specifications ==
=== Main Features ===
- Dimensions: 22 mm x 21 mm x 20 mm
- Velocity: 40 mm/s
- Power consumption: 12 - 17 mW
- Communication: local IR 6 cm, IR & radio 10 m
- Power autonomy: up to 10 hours

=== Main Robot ===
- 2 SWATCH motors with wheels and tires
- Microcontroller PIC16LF877 with 8Kwords Flash program memory
- Plastic frame and flex print with all the electronic components
- 4 active IR proximity sensors (reflection measurement)
- NiMH rechargeable battery
- Receiver for remote control
- 24 pin connector for extension, voltage regulator and power switch

=== Extension modules ===
- Linear camera 102 pixels
- Bidirectional radio communication
- Tactile sensors
- Zigbee ready radio module running TinyOS

=== Projects and applications ===
- 20 robots at Swiss Expo.02
- RobOnWeb
- Navigation and map building
- Soccer Kit : 2 teams of 3 Alices play soccer on an A4 page
- Collective behavior investigations: video.mov 1 and 2
- Mixed society robots-insects as part of the European LEURRE project
- Investigation of levels of selection and relatedness on the evolution of cooperation in the ANTS project
