= Elisa Molina de Stahl =

Guatemalan social worker and philanthropist (1918–1996)

- Born: Elisa Molina Martínez; 24 March 1918; Quetzaltenango, Guatemala
- Died: 3 November 1996 (aged 78); Guatemala City, Guatemala
- Education: Universidad de San Carlos de Guatemala, School of Social Work
- Occupations: Social worker; philanthropist
- Organization(s): National Committee for the Blind and Deaf
- Spouse: Rodolfo Stahl Robles (m. 1938)
- Children: 2
- Relatives: Rodolfo Robles Valverde (first cousin once removed)
- Awards: Order of the Aztec Eagle, First Class, 1965; Order of the Quetzal, Grand Cross, 1992

Elisa Molina de Stahl (1918–1996) was a Guatemalan social worker and philanthropist, known for founding the National Committee for the Blind and Deaf (Spanish: Comité Nacional Pro Ciegos y Sordos).

== Biography ==
=== Early life and education ===
Elisa Molina Martínez was born on 24 March 1918 in Quetzaltenango, to José Vicente Molina Valverde and Concha Martínez. Her mother died when she was four years old, so she was raised by her father and her aunt, Elisa Robles Valderde. Her father, along with his cousin, Rodolfo Robles Valverde, were the founders of the National Institute of Vaccination.

She completed her elementary studies in her hometown, and finished high school in Guatemala City. Afterwards, she graduated as a social worker from the Universidad de San Carlos de Guatemala, School of Social Work (Spanish: Escuela de Trabajo Social). The topic for her graduation thesis was "Contribution to the Rehabilitation of Visually Impaired People in Guatemala."

=== National Committee for the Blind and Deaf ===
In 1945 Molina founded the National Committee for the Blind and Deaf. The Committee set up hospitals and clinics for the treatment of eye diseases. It also organized more than thirty programs targeted towards low income families, for disease treatment and blindness prevention. In the 1950s she was appointed ad honorem president and director of the Committee. In that decade, she established the "Santa Lucía" School for the Blind, as well as the "Santa Lucía" Industrial Crafts. In order to obtain funds for these endeavors, Molina established the "Santa Lucía" lottery. Income from the lottery supplies funding for the committee's programs; the lottery also provides employment for blind people, who work selling lottery tickets.

=== Other work ===
In addition to her work in the Committee, Molina de Stahl also worked ad-honorem for the Ministry of Public Health, organizing the Department of Social Work between 1956 and 1958. In 1959, she founded the University of San Carlos of Guatemala's Rural School of Social Services in Quetzaltenango, and in 1966 she promoted the creation of the first Credit and Savings Union for the Blind "Santa Lucía".

She also encouraged the establishment of family courts for the protection of women and children, and established Social Welfare Centers to improve the socioeconomic level of Guatemalan women. In 1992, Molina de Stahl helped establish a Braille section in the National Library of Guatemala.

=== Personal life ===
In 1938 Molina married Rodolfo Stahl Robles. They had two sons, Rodolfo and Roberto.

Molina died in Guatemala City on November 3, 1996.

== Honors ==
Molina received multiple honors and awards:

- Favorite Daughter of Quetzaltenango in 1953
- Women of the Americas award from the World Health Organization in 1962
- Order of the Aztec Eagle, First Class, in 1965
- Honoris Causa Doctorate in Social Sciences, Universidad del Valle de Guatemala in 1989
- Order of the Quetzal, Grand Cross, in 1992

Molina was nominated for the Nobel Peace Prize in 1992; the prize was granted to Rigoberta Menchú, also from Guatemala.
