= Lília Guerra =

Brazilian author (born 1976)

- Born: 1976 (age 49–50)
- Occupation: Author

Lília Guerra (born 1976, in São Paulo) is a Brazilian author known for her work O céu para os bastardos.

== Biography ==
Lília Guerra is a Brazilian author, known for works such as O céu para os bastardos (Heaven is for the Bastards). She was born in São Paulo in 1976 into a matriarchal household consisting of her mother, grandmother and sister. Guerra never met her father who had a relationship with her mother as a teenager when he was 76 years old, as she found out from her half-sister. She was close to her grandmother who she took care of in her later years saying "A lot of what I write are conversations that I would like to have with people and couldn't. The main one is my grandmother, we spent a lot of time alone, we talked a lot".

Guerra has two daughters, Barbara and Thaís, and has lived in Cidade Tiradentes in east São Paulo since 1999. In 2025, Guerra works as a nursing assistant for the Unified Health System (Sistema Único de Saúde - SUS). She also promotes literacy initiatives in São Paulo.

Before nursing, she was a maid, as was her mother and grandmother, and she describes it as a right of passage that her daughters were spared from. Guerra had a close relationship with literature from a young age saying “The library was my home and the books were my toys”.

== Career ==
Guerra began her publishing career in 2014 with Amor Avenida, inspired by her mother’s life and relationship to Guerra’s father. Her 2018 collection of short stories Perifobia was a finalist for the 2019 Rio Literature Award. In 2021, Rua do larguinho was published, a novel that centers the stories of ordinary black women working as domestic workers. In 2022, Guerra published Crônicas para colorir a cidade and Novelas que escrevi para o rádio Vol. 1, 2 e 3. In September 2023, O céu para os bastardos was published, and was a finalist in the São Paulo literature prize. Her unpublished work Cavco do Oficio was selected as one of 61 pieces for the Carolina Maria de Jesus Award for Literature Produced by Women.

She says much of her work is dedicated to her grandmother Dona Júlia.

Guerra centers her work on women on the periphery of Brazilian society, describing the reason she names all her characters as, "We don't have a name anymore, almost never. It's the coffee girl, the cleaning aunt, the lunch girl. I want people to have a name, a face, a story."
