= Elisa Pritzker =

Argentine artist (born 1955)

- Born: 1955 (age 70–71); Mar del Plata, Argentina
- Education: Master of Fine Arts
- Alma mater: Superior School of Visual Arts
- Occupation: Visual artist
- Website: elisapritzker.com

Elisa Pritzker (born 1955) is an Argentine-American artist working in a variety of two- and three-dimensional art media.

== Background ==
In Argentina, Pritzker studied at the School of Ceramics and earned her certification in 1976. She also attended the Superior School of Visual Arts earning her Master of Fine Arts degree in 1987. Pritzker went on to teach at both schools, the School of Ceramics from 1982 to 1989 and at the Superior School of Visual Arts from 1987 to 1989.

She resides with her husband, entrepreneur Enrique Rob Lunski, at their estate, Casa del Arte, in Ulster County, New York.

== Art ==
In 1993, Pritzker moved to the United States and settled in New York State's Hudson Valley, where she embarked on a series of artworks on the themes of love, war and peace which eventually evolved into projects with deeper roots using non-traditional materials.

=== "CD Project" ===
In the "CD Project," Pritzker created "@Maya," in 2001–2004, and "Nature versus Technology" for the Kingston Sculpture Biennial of 2005. In these works, Pritzker recycled CDs in ways contradictory to their manufactured purpose. In "@Maya," she drew Mayan scientific and astrological signs and symbols on the surface of the CDs, thus cross-referencing the science of the Maya with the technological language of contemporary America. For "Nature versus Technology," she covered the lower section of a living tree in CDs in a wooded area of Kingston, New York. The work served as an inquiry into the ramifications of technology encroaching on the natural environment.

=== "Buddha Project" ===
In 2007, as part of the "No East-No West" exhibition at the Van Brunt Gallery in Beacon, New York, Pritzker created the "Buddha Project," an installation conceived as an allegory to enter into the inner self. The installation occupied its own room in the gallery and featured images of Buddha as a silhouette and small veneration objects, meditation boxes, and other objects associated with contemplation. The gallery floor was arranged with white sand and a bowl of water, representing the Buddhist symbols of purity, meditation cushions and a path of stones. The room culminated in a large and colorful "Eyes of the Buddha," which Pritzker painted directly on the gallery wall. Beneath the painting, on the ledge of the lower molding of the wall, Pritzker arranged a line of incense cones as ritualistic symbols. At the close of the exhibition, Pritzker painted over the "Eyes of the Buddha," returning the wall to its original white, following the Buddhist tradition of mandalas, the complex patterns painstakingly created with various colors of sand, then destroyed, the Tantric ritual complete.

=== "URBA.NATURAL" ===
The "Buddha Project" prompted Pritzker's interest in installation work. Concurrent with this interest in installation, Pritzker was drawn towards an art which interacted with nature, physically, aesthetically and philosophically. Her "URBA.NATURAL", dating from 2010, consisted of four projects: "zippers;" "trunks;" "birds.dogs.deer;" and "antlers.jaws.skin." In "zippers," Pritzker uses the motif of the zipper to reveal nature and humanity's place within it. In "trunks," Pritzker incongruously united two of her long expressed themes, nature and human experience, by placing men's underwear or trouser torsos on trunks of trees. "birds.dogs.deer" brought together such diverse elements including porcelain, ceramic and resin figures of dogs, twigs, painted CDs and hand painted additions to photographs printed on aluminum. For "antlers.jaws.skin," she reached deep into her South American heritage and merged it with her connection to nature, drawing lines and shapes reflective of indigenous peoples on animal bones.

=== Other projects ===
In 2012, Pritzker created the "Eclectica Store/Hudson Valley," utilizing objects she'd collected or created over the years, and set them up as a store. In this expression of a store as art form, the assortment of objects served as a "metaphor pointing to the eclecticism of the Hudson Valley," an area of diversity in the natural environment and the human, social and civic environment.

Pritzker's work continues her interest in human interaction with nature. Her project, the "Selknam Series," referenced the indigenous people of southern Argentina and Chile, and is an "investigation, research and visual homage to a rich and deep civilization that is now totally extinct. I have always questioned humanity's ancestral and ongoing violence towards other cultures. Honoring the Selknam is a reminder that there are still many inhuman acts everywhere." This series was also part of the International Art Biennale Fresh Winds exhibition in Gardur, Iceland from December 2015 to January 2016. Pritzker exhibited "Selknam: Spirit, Ceremony, Selves" at the Hudson Valley Center for Contemporary Art (HVCCA) Museum from May to September 2017 and the Gallery of the Consulate General of Argentina in New York in October 2017.

In addition to her work as an artist, Pritzker is active as a curator. She is also the co-founder of HCC-Arts and has been recognized for her work with that organization. Her interviews and work have appeared in magazines, such as Poets and Artists, on PBS, and on radio. Pritzer also is the author of a syndicated column, "La Esquina de las Artes" (The Corner of the Arts), published in La Voz at Bard College and ABClatino magazine.

== Exhibitions and collections ==
Pritzker has exhibited extensively in the United States and abroad, in group and solo exhibitions, including such notable New York City venues as the Museum of Modern Art, the Cork Gallery at Lincoln Center Plaza, Franklin 54 Gallery, the Pinta Art Fair, Brooklyn's NurtureArt, and the Sculpture Center in Long Island City, Queens. Her New York State exhibition venues include the Samuel Dorsky Museum of Art (SDMA), the Hudson Valley Center for Contemporary Arts [HVCCA], the Kingston Museum of Contemporary Arts (KMOCA) and in various venues in the Hudson Valley. Internationally, Pritzker's work has been exhibited at the National Institute of Art in Taipei, Taiwan; the Naxos Town Hall, Naxos, Greece; the London Biennial/Gallery 32, London, U.K.; Galeria de Arte Buenos Aires Sur and Galeria Arte x Arte, both in Buenos Aires, Argentina; Taste Modern Berlin Art Gallery, Berlin, Germany; Casa Argentina, Jerusalem, Israel; and others.

Her work is represented in significant collections in New York and abroad, including Dia Beacon, Beacon, New York; the Brooklyn Art Library, Brooklyn, New York; the Samuel Dorsky Museum of Art, New Paltz, New York; Jean et Colette Cherqui Art Collection, Paris, France & New York; Consulate General of Argentina in New York; Buenos Aires' Galeria de Arte Vuelvo al Sur and Fundacion Luz y Alfonso Castillo; and in private collections in the United States, London, Germany and Israel.

== Awards and honors ==
Pritzker has been the recipient of numerous awards, including two Congressional Awards by US Congressman Maurice Hinchey for achievements and service in the area of Community Arts and Culture; a National Black Prestige Award; a J.P. Morgan Chase, Working Woman honoree; and several others. She has also been awarded several grants, including the S.O.S. Grant from the New York State Council on the Arts and the New York Foundation for the Arts; a Puffin Foundation Grant, among others.

Pritzker was the U.S. representative artist invited to the international art project, "The Pyramids of Naxos", focused on the environment and waste presented during the 2004 Olympics in Greece. In January 2018, she was the featured artist in Sanctuary magazine.
