= Elisa Marusic =

Chilean endocrinologist (born 1934)

- Born: 28 February 1934 (age 92); Punta Arenas, Chile
- Occupation: Endocrinologist
- Awards: Guggenheim Fellowship (1970)

Academic background
- Education: University of Chile; University of Buenos Aires (PhD); Yale University (PhD)

Academic work
- Discipline: Endocrinology
- Sub-discipline: Renal endocrinology; vascular physiology; hypertension
- Institutions: University of Chile

Elisa T. Marusic Bauk (born 28 February 1934) is a Chilean endocrinologist. She worked at the University of Chile for over two decades before co-founding the University of the Andes Faculty of Medicine. She won a 1978 Guggenheim Fellowship and the 2010 Chilean Society of Endocrinology and Metabolism Outstanding Researcher award.

== Biography ==
Marusic was born on 28 February 1934 in Punta Arenas. She attended the University of Chile, where she obtained a degree in chemistry in the 1950s, (Note: Sources disagree on if it was obtained in 1958 or 1956.) and subsequently worked at Bernardo Houssay's laboratory at the University of Buenos Aires, obtaining a PhD in 1962. She then went to the United States to work at Yale University, where she was a postdoctoral fellow from 1965 to 1967 and received a PhD in endocrine sciences in 1968 on a National Institutes of Health scholarship.

Returning from the United States, Marusic became an associate professor at the University of Chile School of Medicine in 1970, before being promoted to full professor in 1974. She served as chair of the department of physiology and biophysics from 1974 to 1976, before becoming head of the Endocrine and Metabolism Unit in 1976. In 1996, she retired from the University of Chile. She subsequently joined the University of the Andes as one of the founders of their Faculty of Medicine.

Marusic specializes in renal endocrinology, though some of her recent research is centered on vascular physiology and hypertension. Cecilia Hidalgo Tapia cited her as an internationally known pioneer in the study of aldosterone. In 1978, she was awarded a Guggenheim Fellowship for "biochemical studies in the field of adrenal physiology". In her book Mujeres chilenas, Sonia Montecino cited her as one of the founders of the Chilean Society of Physiological Sciences. She won the 2010 Chilean Society of Endocrinology and Metabolism Outstanding Researcher award. In 2013, the University of the Andes awarded her an honorary degree.
