= Asset Limited, Income Constrained, Employed =

Economic definition

Asset Limited, Income Constrained, Employed or ALICE is a metric used to classify households in the United States who are not economically secure. The measure includes more households than the Federal Poverty Level.

The term ALICE was coined in 2012 by the United Way of Northern New Jersey, to describe households that earn too much income to qualify for food stamps but still need assistance. The United Way has defined an Alice threshold for each type of household (rural or urban) in each U.S. county, based on an estimated cost of living. ALICE describes about 29% of the population and 42% of families in the U.S., including people below the poverty line.
