= Alice (2002 film) =

2002 film by Sylvie Ballyot

- Film cover.
- Directed by: Sylvie Ballyot
- Screenplay by: Laurent Larivière
- Produced by: Jean-Philippe Labadie; Nathalie Eybrard
- Starring: Anne Bargain; Lei Dinety; Élodie Mennegand
- Production company: Catncage Pictures
- Distributed by: Epicentre Films
- Release date: 8 December 2002 (France)
- Running time: 48 minutes
- Countries: France; United Kingdom
- Language: French

Alice is a 2002 French-British film directed by Sylvie Ballyot and produced by Nathlie Eybrard and Jean Philippe Labadie about Alice and her sister Manon who is about to be married.

== Synopsis ==
Alice has deeply buried feelings and memories for her sister Manon, who is about to be married. During their childhood, the two sisters were extremely close not only emotionally, but also sexually. With news of the wedding, the pain of the past resurfaces and Alice's relationship with her girlfriend Elsa starts to fall apart. As the wedding approaches, Alice reminisces about her childhood, and has trouble letting go of her incestuous relationship with Manon.

== Cast ==
- Anne Bargain as Alice
- Valentine Dubreuil as Young Alice
- Élodie Mennegand as Manon
- Lucie Lessieur as Young Manon
- Lei Dinety as Elsa
- David Kammenos as Atom
- Alain Lahaye as the Father
- Armelle Legrand as the Mother
- Violetta Ferrer as the Grandmother
