= Alice (short story collection) =

- Author: Judith Hermann
- Translator: Margot Bettauer Dembo
- Language: German
- Publisher: S. Fischer Verlag
- Publication date: 2009
- Publication place: Germany
- English publication date: 201
- Pages: 188
- ISBN: 978-3-10-033182-3

Alice is a 2009 short story collection by the German writer Judith Hermann. It was shortlisted for the Independent Foreign Fiction Prize.

The book contains five short stories named for five men (Micha, Conrad, Richard, Malte, Raymond) whom the protagonist, Alice, has known or known of at different periods in her life. The stories deal with bereavement and farewells. While attending the Edinburgh International Book Festival in 2011, Hermann told her interviewer that it is "not a book about dying, it's a book about living," which is to say "it's about "living while somebody is dying" and admitted that it has autobiographical reference points.

== Reception ==
In his review in The Guardian, Philip Hensher finds this book more impressive than her debut novel Summerhouse, Later, describing it as "distinctively German in the best, most romantically thoughtful way", and notes that her style "though highly restrained, is the opposite of affectless; rather, it is all affect, even when the human connections come second to the patient, insect-like observations."

== See also ==
- 2009 in literature
- German literature
