= Elisa Pirro =

Italian politician (born 1973)

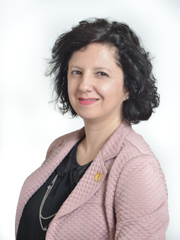
- Pirro in 2018

Member of the Senate
- Incumbent
- Assumed office 23 March 2018
- Constituency: Piedmont – P01 (2018–2022); Piedmont – P01 (2022–present)

Personal details
- Born: 15 July 1973 (age 53)
- Party: Five Star Movement

Elisa Pirro (born 15 July 1973) is an Italian politician serving as a member of the Senate since 2018. She has served as treasurer of the Five Star Movement group in the Senate since 2022. From 2013 to 2018, she was a municipal councillor of Orbassano.

== Biography ==
Born on July 15, 1973, in Turin, but raised in Lazio until the age of 19, she lives in Orbassano, in the Metropolitan City of Turin, and earned a degree in biological sciences (with a focus on pathophysiology) with a grade of 102/110 on July 4, 2000, from the University of Turin, where she attended the Pharmacology Laboratory of the Department of Clinical and Biological Sciences at the University of Turin in 1997, 1998, 1999, and 2000.

Since May 4, 2001, she has worked as a research technician in the Department of Clinical and Biological Sciences at the University of Turin in the “Franco Ghezzo” Clinical Pharmacology Unit, where she has conducted research on pharmacokinetic studies, antineoplastic therapy, and drug quantification using HPLC to optimize treatment in the fields of oncology, hematology, and Cardiology.
