= Eliza (computer virus) =

Computer virus

Malware details
- Technical name: Eliza
- Type: DOS
- Classification: Virus
- Family: File Replicator
- Isolation date: December 1991
- Origin: Unknown
- Author: Unknown

Eliza is a computer virus discovered in December 1991. It infects COM files including COMMAND.COM. It has been reported that it is defective, yet destroys the .EXE files it creates. The .COM files are not deleted. To avoid detection, it does not alter the dates of files it infects, but increases their length by 1,193 or 1,194 bytes. It is also found in later versions of Windows.

== DOS Strain ==
One of the forms of Eliza attacks the MS-DOS operating system by reproducing itself into COM and .EXE files. However, the virus has a bug that causes it to delete only .EXE files. Because it is defective and easy to track, it has been considered a minimal threat.

== Windows NT/2000/XP/Vista/7 Strain ==
It is unknown whether the same person developed the Windows strain, which is much more damaging and is considered a legitimate threat. One site reports that it does the following:

- Remotely controls the computer
- Wastes system resources and CPU usage
- Tracks Internet activity and keystrokes, allowing the hacker to record/steal passwords, credit card numbers, etc.

The virus can be removed with an antivirus program, or by rebooting in Safe Mode and manually removing the infected files.
