= ALICE (company) =

Hospitality technology company

- Type: Private
- Industry: Technology; Hospitality
- Founded: 2013
- Founders: Justin Effron (CEO); Alexander Shashou (President; Dmitry Koltunov (CTO)
- Headquarters: New York City, U.S.
- Area served: Worldwide
- Products: Hotel Operations System
- Website: info.aliceapp.com

ALICE is a hospitality technology company based in New York City. The company produces an eponymous operations platform that allows hotel guests to use an app on their smartphones to request services from hotel management. Guests can use both the ALICE app and SMS on their smartphones to request services such as restaurant reservations, taxi accommodations, room service, maintenance work, and other items and services.

ALICE's largest investor is Expedia which led a $9.5 million funding round in 2016 and a $26 million funding round in 2017.

== History ==
ALICE was founded in 2013 by Justin Effron (CEO), Alexander Shashou (President), and Dmitry Koltunov (CTO). Effron (a former equity analyst at Citigroup) and Shashou (a member of a UK hotelier family and former employee at Goldman Sachs) devised the idea for ALICE while traveling in Southeast Asia and recognizing the communication difficulties different hotel departments commonly experienced. The two spent 9 months researching the hospitality industry, interviewing around 500 hotel managers and employees during that time. This led to the foundation of ALICE in 2013. Koltunov, who previously helped build the back end trading management system for a hedge fund, spearheaded the technological aspects of the platform.

The name of the company is an acronym for "A Life-Improving Customer Experience." The name also pays homage to the maid character, Alice Nelson, from The Brady Bunch. By 2014, the company counted the Atlantic Hotel in Fort Lauderdale, the Hutton Hotel in Nashville, and the Setai in Miami Beach among their clients. Its first headquarters was located in Union Square, Manhattan.

In February 2015, ALICE received $3 million in seed funding from an investment group that included Seamless co-founders Jason Finger, Todd Arky, and Paul Applebaum; Tishman Realty; 645 Ventures; and the founder of Neuehouse. The company had originally sought $750,000 in funding but bumped it up after demand increased. At the time of the announcement, ALICE's clients included Shangri-La's Hotel Jen, The Gansevoort Group, Standard Hotels, Bespoke Hotels, and Sixty Hotel Group. In June 2015, ALICE launched an updated version of the platform with real-time translation technology. The technology allowed guests to communicate with hotel staff via the app regardless of any language barrier.

In December 2015, Expedia announced that it had invested in ALICE, but details of the deal remained confidential. The following month, ALICE relocated its headquarters from Union Square to Herald Square. Later in January, ALICE announced that they had received $9.5 million in funding from Expedia. The funding round also featured 645 Ventures, Neuehouse founders, and Laconia. Additional funding came from Expedia in 2017 when it led a $26 million funding round, becoming the company's majority shareholder. In 2017, ALICE also acquired its competitor GoConcierge.

In April 2020, during the coronavirus pandemic, ALICE developed and released a software called COVID-19 Checklists Software designed to help hoteliers with tools to streamline operations and communications. It tracks progress and provides reports for hoteliers.

== Products ==
ALICE's primary product is a workflow management system that is used by Front of House and Back of House staff to dispatch, track and execute all requests and communication. The product is used as an organizational tool for hotel management as it provides them with the ability to schedule, record, and recall data on a single platform. It allows multiple hotel departments and systems to communicate directly through the platform while also offering management the ability to monitor the life cycle of any given task.

The platform also has a guest services module that allows hotel guests to communicate with hotel staff using either a white-label or ALICE-branded app on their smartphone. The app allows guests to request services and items from hotel staff and has been described as a "digital concierge." Room service, maid service, dinner reservations, taxi accommodations, spa reservations, item requests, maintenance service, and more can be scheduled or requested via ALICE's app. The platform also uses web and SMS options to allow for broader communication between guests and staff. A 2015 update to the platform added real-time language translation, as well.

The platform works on an SaaS pricing model in which hotels to pay a monthly fee for the service. ALICE is also looking to expand the product into workspaces and residential units given its strength in package management and digital concierge capabilities often utilized in both multifamily real estate in addition to hospitality.
