= Peter Alliss Masters =

Golfing society based in the United Kingdom

Peter Alliss Masters is a golfing society that raises funds to provide children who have very limited mobility with powered wheelchairs. The charity has been going since the 1970s led by its patron, BBC's Voice of Golf, Peter Alliss.
