= Braden Barty =

American director and producer

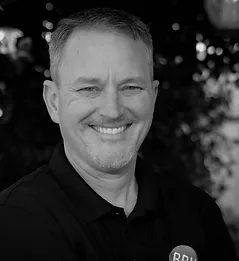
- Born: July 24, 1970 (age 56); Los Angeles, California, U.S.
- Education: University of Utah
- Occupations: Director, producer
- Years active: 1996–present
- Spouse: Michelle (m. 2006)
- Children: 1
- Relatives: Billy Barty (father)

Braden Barty (born July 24, 1970) is an American director, video content strategist, and producer best known for his work on Far Away Eyes, Spirit Space (2008), Flipping Vegas, and Club Shay Shay. He is also owner and founder of Braden Barty Media and TubeFlex Media based in Burbank, California.

== Biography ==
=== Early life ===
Barty was born in Los Angeles and raised in North Hollywood. His father, Billy Barty, was an American film actor, entertainer and activist and one of the most famous 20th century people with dwarfism. His mother (also a dwarf), Shirley Bolingbroke, was a graphic design artist and a graduate from the California Institute of Arts. Braden was born above average height.

=== Career ===
Barty is a film graduate from the University of Utah. After graduating in 1996, he returned to Los Angeles to pursue a career in film and television. For three years he worked as an assistant director on low-budget films and television series. That same year, his student documentary Far Away Eyes: A Portrait of Autism won first place at the Utah Film Front Festival and was later distributed by Chip Taylor Communications.

Around 2000, Barty founded Braden Barty Media, a production company based in Burbank, California, specializing in commercials, corporate videos, and short-form video content. Through this company, he has worked with numerous artists producing behind-the-scenes videos for acts such as Fall Out Boy, Lionel Richie, Foo Fighters, Jennifer Lopez, Mariah Carey, Ne-Yo, Rihanna, and others. He also directed the music video for Brooke White's single "Free".

In 2005, Barty began production on the metaphysical documentary Spirit Space, which explores quantum physics, consciousness, and life after death, and was released in 2008 featuring Fred Alan Wolf, Edgar Mitchell, and Don Miguel Ruiz. In 2006, he co-produced and directed a successful seven-disc fitness video series with former professional wrestler Diamond Dallas Page.

Barty produced TV pilots including Flipping Vegas and Girls Gone Global in 2010. He was co-executive producer for the A&E series Flipping Vegas. His freelance producing work extends to UFC’s Dana White’s Contender Series and UFC Watch Party.

His documentary Kosthi, filmed in Iran, is available on Amazon Prime. As founder of TubeFlex Media, Barty continues to create video marketing content for startups and Fortune 500 companies. Among his digital productions, he filmed with his crew the viral interview with comedian Katt Williams on YouTube’s Club Shay Shay channel, which garnered over 90 million views.

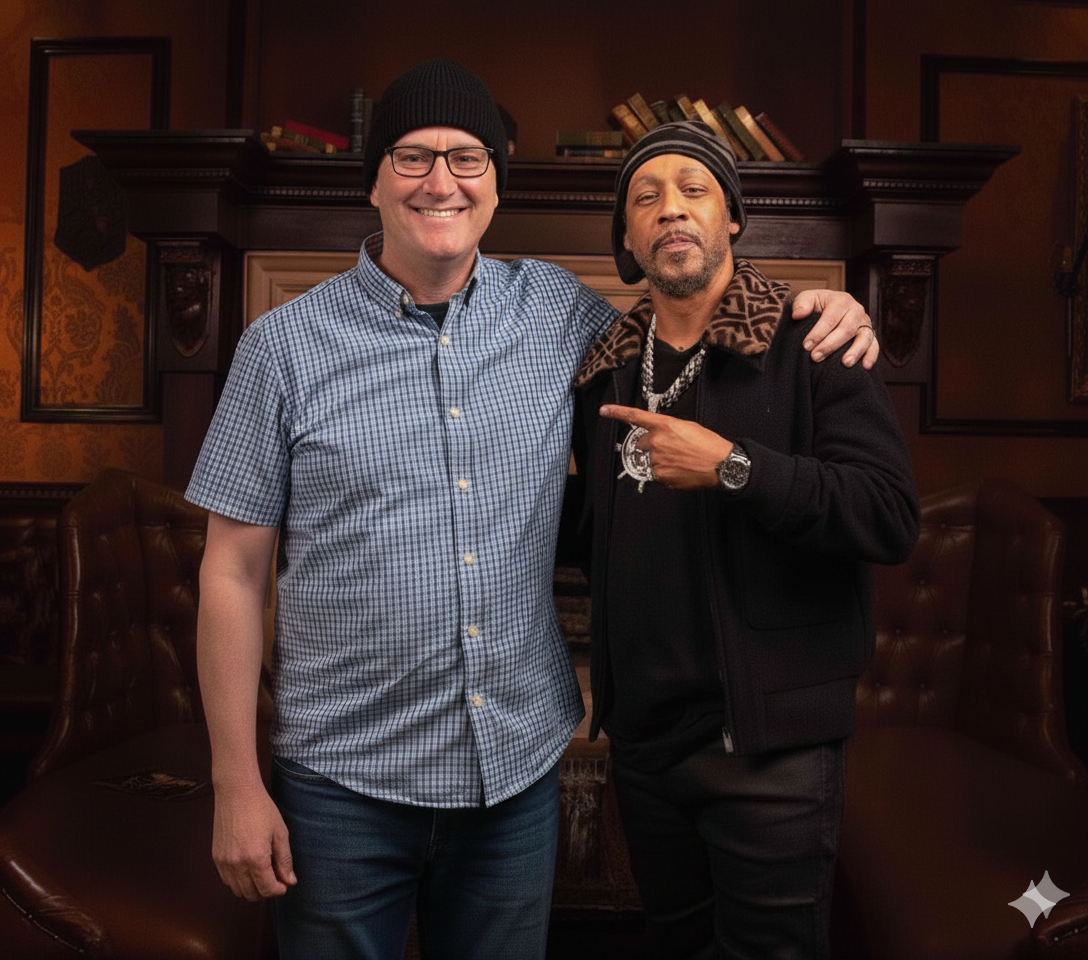
Braden Barty and Kat Williams on set of Club Shay Shay

Additionally, Barty is a co-creator of the award-winning card game Murder at Blood Mansion and writes the weekly newsletter AI Weekly, focusing on artificial intelligence in marketing.

=== Personal life ===
Barty is an active member of The Church of Jesus Christ of Latter-day Saints. He served a two-year mission in Salvador, Brazil from 1990 to 1992. Barty currently resides in La Crescenta, California with his wife Michelle and sons Jonah and Ashton. He is fluent in Spanish, Portuguese, and studied Italian, Hebrew.
