= Alicja Olechowska =

Polish politician (born 1956)

Member of the Sejm
- Incumbent
- Assumed office 19 October 2001
- Constituency: 20 – Warsaw II

Personal details
- Born: 1956 (age 69–70) Grodzisk Mazowiecki
- Party: Civic Platform

Alicja Danuta Olechowska (born 10 February 1956) is a Polish politician. She was elected to the Sejm on 25 September 2005, getting 6395 votes in 20 Warsaw district as a candidate from the Civic Platform list.

She was also a member of Sejm 2001-2005.

== See also ==
- Members of Polish Sejm 2005-2007
