= Elisa Guerra =

Mexican educator, writer and speaker

- Education: Monterrey Institute of Technology and Higher Education; Harvard Graduate School of Education(candidate)
- Occupations: Writer and educator
- Website: elisaguerra.net

Elisa Guerra is a Mexican educator, writer and speaker. Founder of the international network of schools Valle de Filadelfia volunteer director for Latin America of the Institutes for the Achievement of Human Potential, author of educational books and textbooks and member of UNESCO's International Commission Futures of Education.

== Education ==
Guerra graduated with honors in Early Childhood Education and finished first in Mexico's national teacher exams. She holds a master's degree in education with a specialization in the Teaching-Learning process from the Monterrey Institute of Technology and Higher Education, graduating with honors. As of 2020, Guerra was an Education Master candidate at Harvard Graduate School of Education.

== Professional life ==
Dissatisfied with the academic offerings in Aguascalientes, Guerra founded Colegio Valle de Filadelfia. In the beginning, its educational offer was limited to preschool, however, the school currently has programs for primary and secondary students.

To develop the educational proposal of her schools, Guerra created the Philadelphia Method, inspired by Glenn Doman's philosophy. Her methodology stems from the fundamental premise that young children have enormous potential and that it is easier to learn anything the younger you are. The goal of Colegio Valle de Filadelfia has been to help children reach their potential by providing a learning environment rich in stimulation and opportunity. Since there were no books or teaching materials to suit her innovative methods, Guerra created her own. In 2014, Pearson published the series for preschool children, a total of 12 books. At the end of 2017, an additional 12 were published, developed for elementary school children. The program includes early reading, violin, art, global citizenship, languages and physical development. Her model has been franchised and there are now schools in six Mexican cities and a seventh in Costa Rica.

According to Guerra, the program consists of very short sessions, using lots of enthusiasm and a playful approach, without pressure on the children. Play is an integral part of the program. The intent is to enrich the learning environment, as much as possible, with high-quality, exciting stimuli and plenty of opportunities for movement. In Guerra's words: learning should never be a boring task to complete, but the greatest adventure to enjoy.

At school, the time for extracurricular activities has been optimized, developing children's skills. The program places great importance on children appreciating and valuing different cultures, in addition to teaching art, music, and physical activity, activities that develop the cerebral cortex. The program is based on the theory that children can play and learn at the same time, according to Guerra, it is designed to adapt to how the brain learns. Learning to play the violin is a very important part of the program. It aims to help children with their concentration, brain development, and fine motor skills. The Philadelphia Method uses a methodology created by Japanese violin teacher Shinichi Suzuki, beginning as early as age three.

== Works ==
- Doucet, Armand; Evers, Jelmer; Guerra, Elisa; Lopez, Nadia; Soskil, Michael; Timmers, Koen (2018). Teaching in the Fourth Industrial Revolution: Standing at the Precipice. USA: Routledge. ISBN 9781138483231.
- Guerra, Elisa (2013). Aprender a Leer a los 3: Método Doman Aplicado en el Aula Preescolar. USA: Routledge. ISBN 9781652932307.
- Guerra, Elisa (2015). METODO FILADELFIA. YO ESCRIBO, YO CONOZCO A. Mexico: Pearson. ISBN 9789702626619.

== Awards and honors ==
- “Best Educator in Latin America” in 2015 by the Inter-American Development Bank and the ALAS Movement with the ALAS-BID award.
- She has been a two-time finalist, in 2015 and 2016, for Varkey Foundation's “Global Teacher Prize”, referred to by journalists as the “Nobel Prize” for teaching.
- Mujer TEC 2015
- The Raymundo Veras Award for Humanity and Science
