= Eliza (magazine) =

American fashion magazine founded in 2007

- Issue 9
- Editor: Summer Bellessa
- Categories: Fashion magazine
- Frequency: Irregularly
- First issue: June 2007
- Country: United States
- Based in: Los Angeles, California
- Language: English
- Website: elizamagazine.com

Eliza is an American fashion magazine founded in 2007 by Summer Bellessa, who was a Ford Model at that time. The publication is headquartered in Los Angeles, California, and began with a circulation (based on its print run) of 10,000 in 2007. The publishing schedule is now irregular and the magazine is only available digitally and by print-on-demand via HP MagCloud. The magazine's name is a reference to Audrey Hepburn's performance as Eliza Doolittle in My Fair Lady.

== Overview ==
The magazine describes itself as being "for women who want to be stylish, sexy, and engaged in the world while retaining high standards in dress, entertainment, and lifestyle." Founder Summer Bellessa has been described as a leader in the modesty movement.

== Criticism ==
Some critics have called Eliza's focus on modest clothes and its editorial stance "prudish and old-fashioned."
