= Elise =

Elise or Elyse may refer to:

== Arts and entertainment ==
- Elise, the unidentified person to whom Beethoven dedicated Für Elise
- Elise, a 1979 speculative fiction novel by Ken Grimwood
- Élise ou la vraie vie (Elise, or the Real Life), a 1967 novel by the French writer Claire Etcherelli
- Élise ou la vraie vie (Elise, or Real Life), a 1970 French drama film based on the novel of the same name
- Elyse (film), a 2020 American drama film
- "Elise", an episode of the British television programme Foyle's War

== People and fictional characters ==
- Élise, a list of people and fictional characters with the given name Élise, Elise, Elize, or Elyse
- Elise, a character who is Marceline the Vampire Queen's mother in the TV series Adventure Time
- Christine Elise (born 1965), American actress
- Elise Marilyn Jones (born 1997), American actress known professionally as Chloe Cherry
- Kimberly Elise, (born 1967), American actress
- Lily Elise (born 1991), American singer and songwriter

== Transportation ==
- Lotus Elise, a British sports car
- Steam ship Élise, the first steamboat to cross the English Channel

== See also ==
- "Fur Elise", a famous Beethoven song composed in 1810
- "A Letter to Elise", a 1992 single by The Cure
- "A Perfect Day Elise", a 1998 single by PJ Harvey
- Elize (given name)
- Elisa (disambiguation)
- Alise (disambiguation)
- Lise (disambiguation)
