= Pae =

Pae may refer to:

== Places ==
- Pae River, former name of the Taedong River in Pyongyang, Korea
- Pae, Tallinn, subdistrict of Lasnamäe District, Tallinn, Estonia
- Pae, Padise Parish, village in Padise Parish, Harju County, Estonia
- Pae, Rapla County, village in Kehtna Parish, Rapla County, Estonia

== People ==
- Yustinus Pae (born 1983), Indonesian footballer
- Pae Gil-su (born 1972), North Korean gymnast
- Mark Pae (born 1926), Anglican bishop
- Pae Tal-jun (born 1972), North Korean politician

== Other uses ==
- Pae (wasp), a genus of wasps in the family Crabronidae
- Pacific Architects and Engineers, an American defense and government services contractor
- Paine Field (Snohomish County Airport), a commercial airport in Everett, Washington, United States, (by IATA and FAA LID)
- PAE (Prostatic artery embolization), a medical procedure
