= Kuristiku =

Subdistrict of Tallinn, Estonia

Coordinates: 59.451183°N 24.867682°E

- Subdistrict of Tallinn
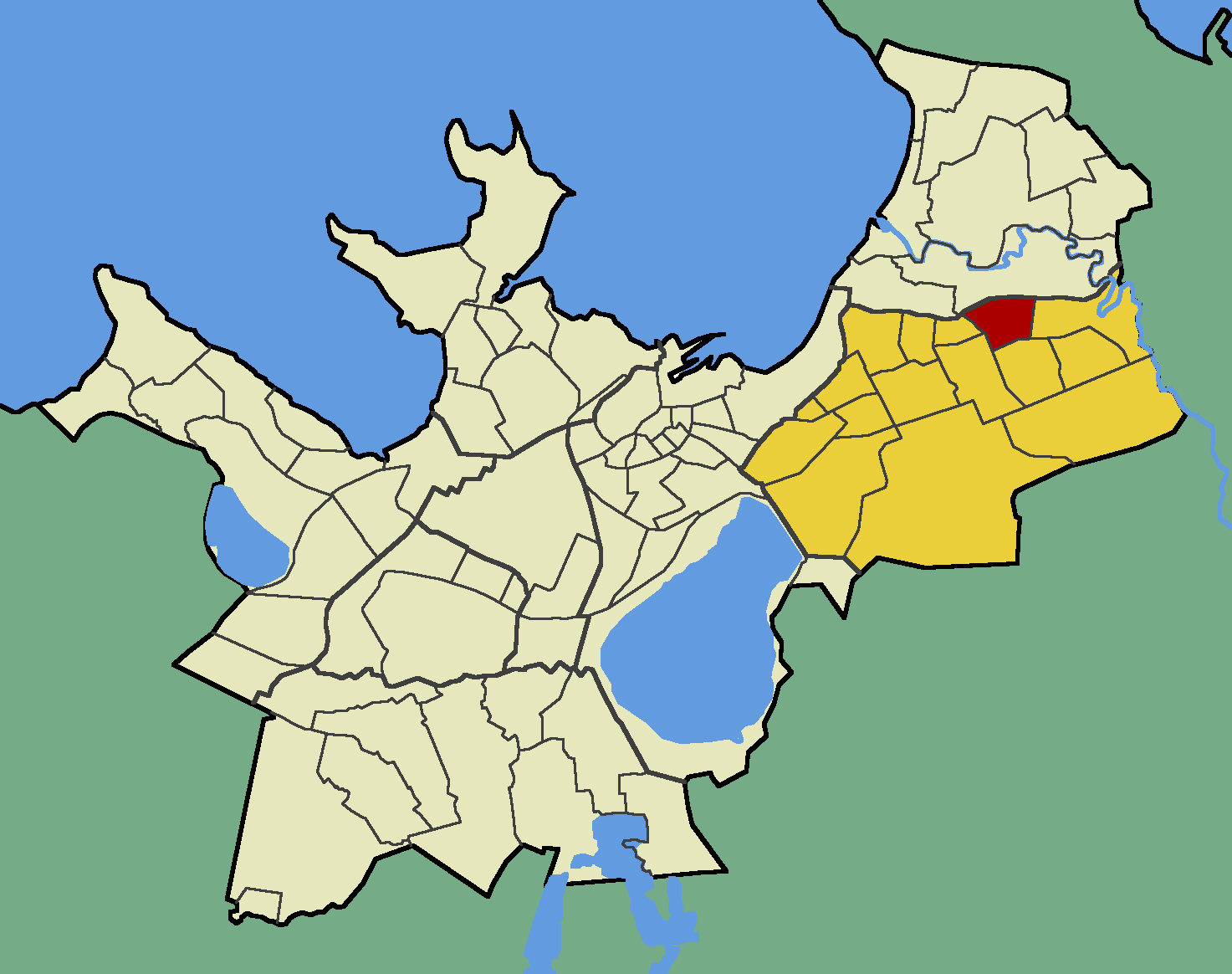
- Kuristiku within Lasnamäe District.
- Country: Estonia
- County: Harju County
- City: Tallinn
- District: Lasnamäe

Population (01.01.2014)
  - Total: 11,109

Kuristiku (Estonian for "Gorge") is a subdistrict (Estonian: asum) in the district of Lasnamäe, Tallinn, the capital of Estonia. It has a population of 11,109 (As of 1 January 2014).

== Gallery ==
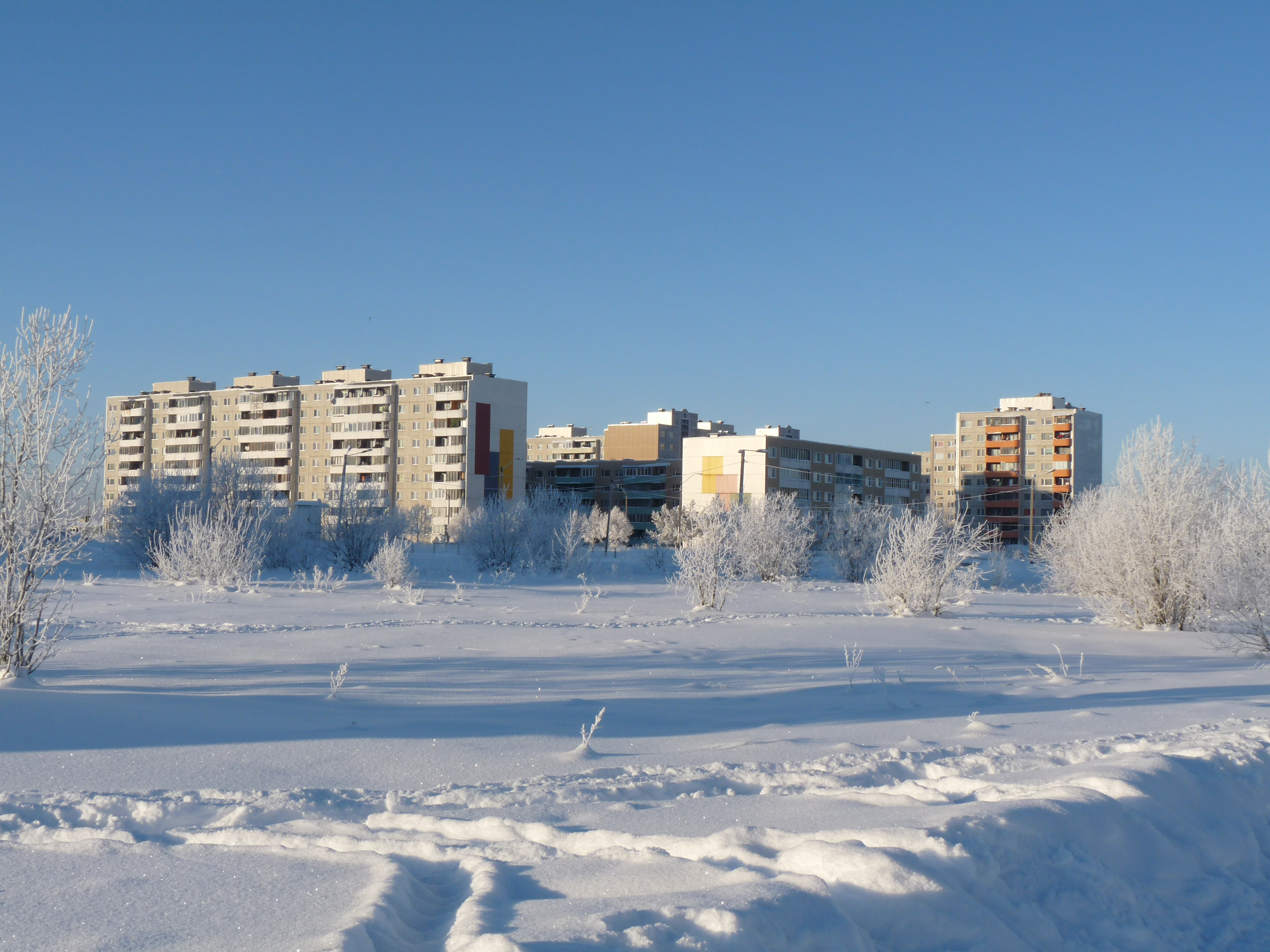

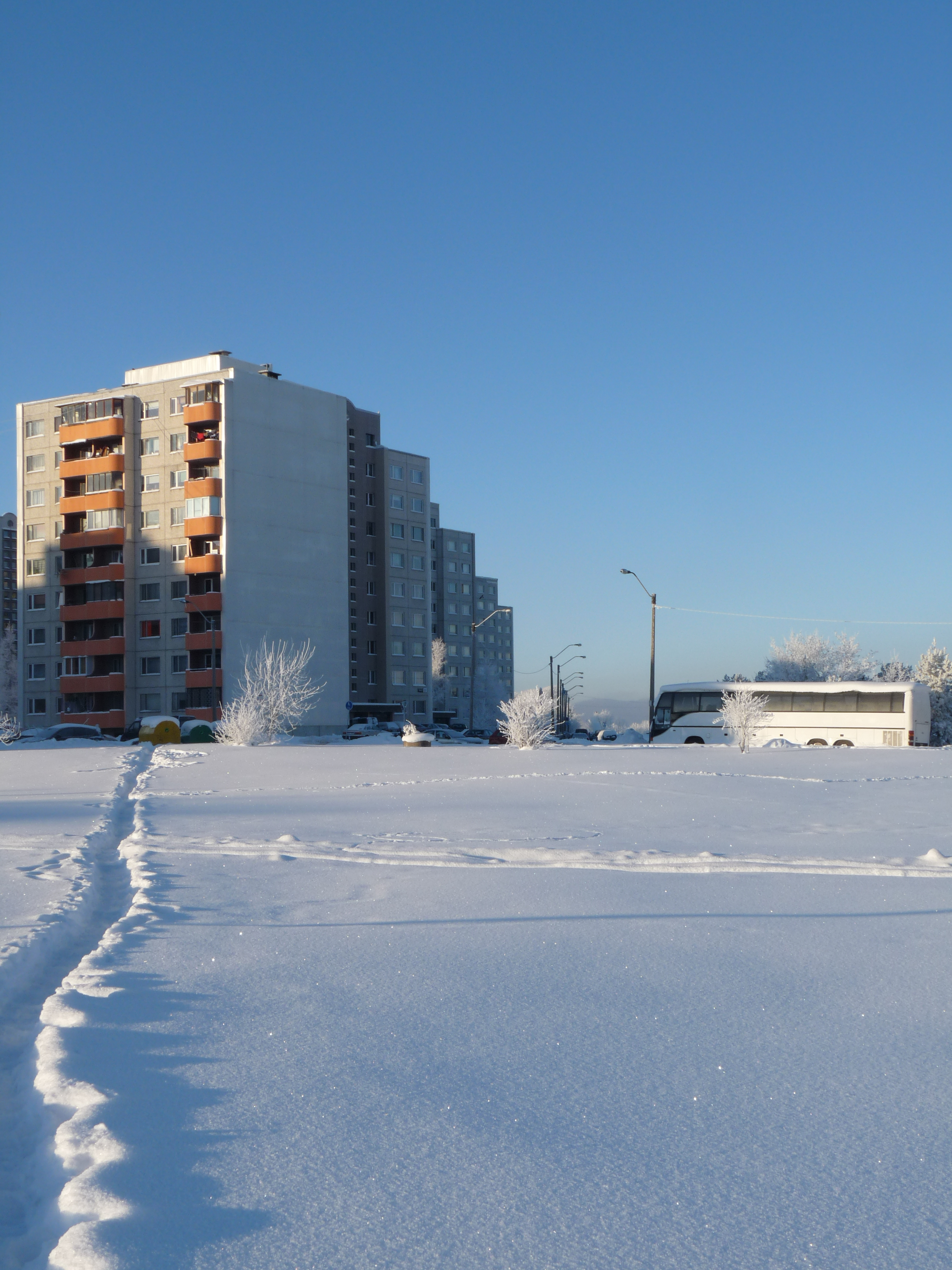

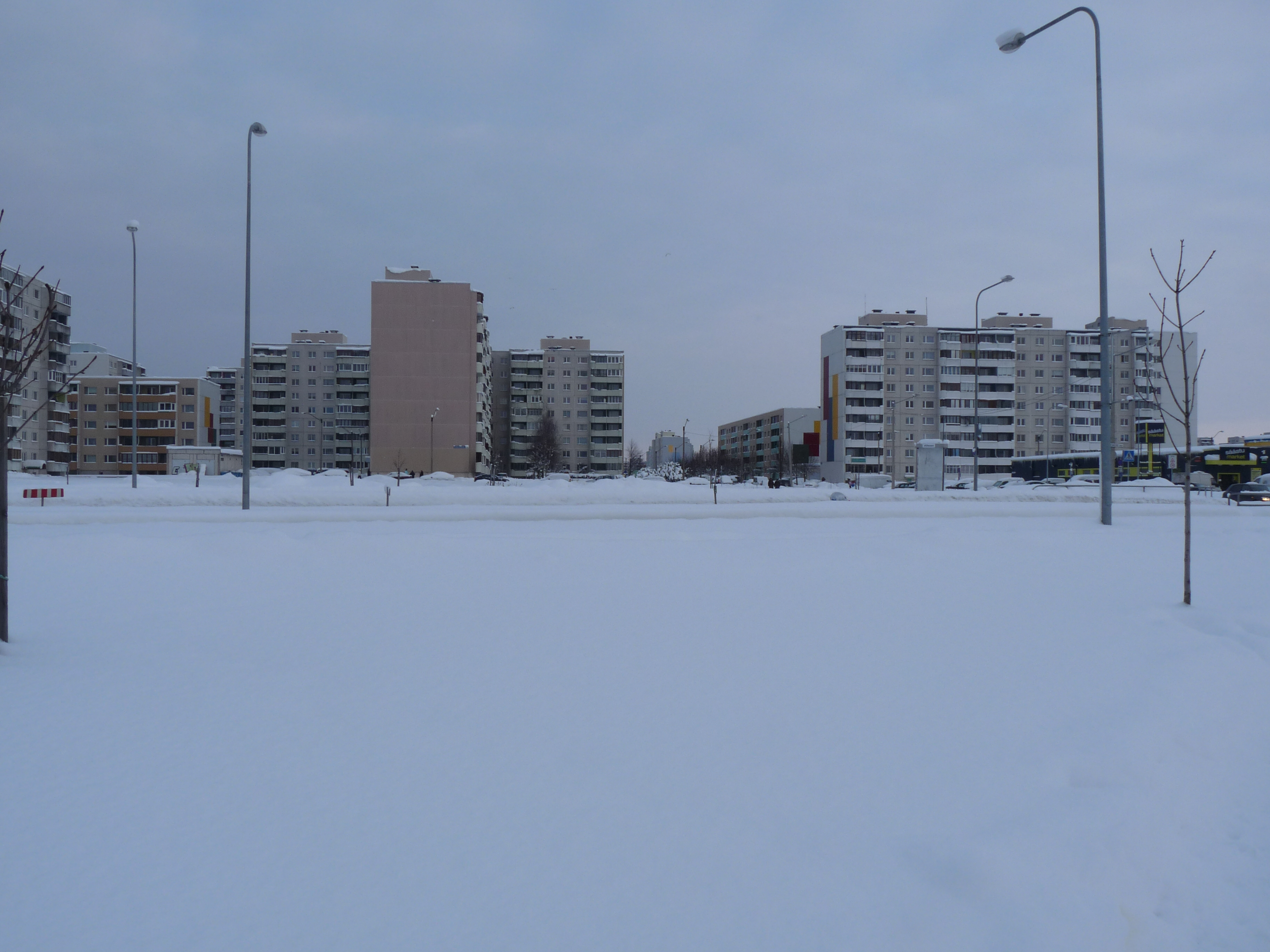
