= Sikupilli =

Subdistrict of Tallinn, Estonia

Coordinates: 59.427394°N 24.788364°E

- Subdistrict of Tallinn
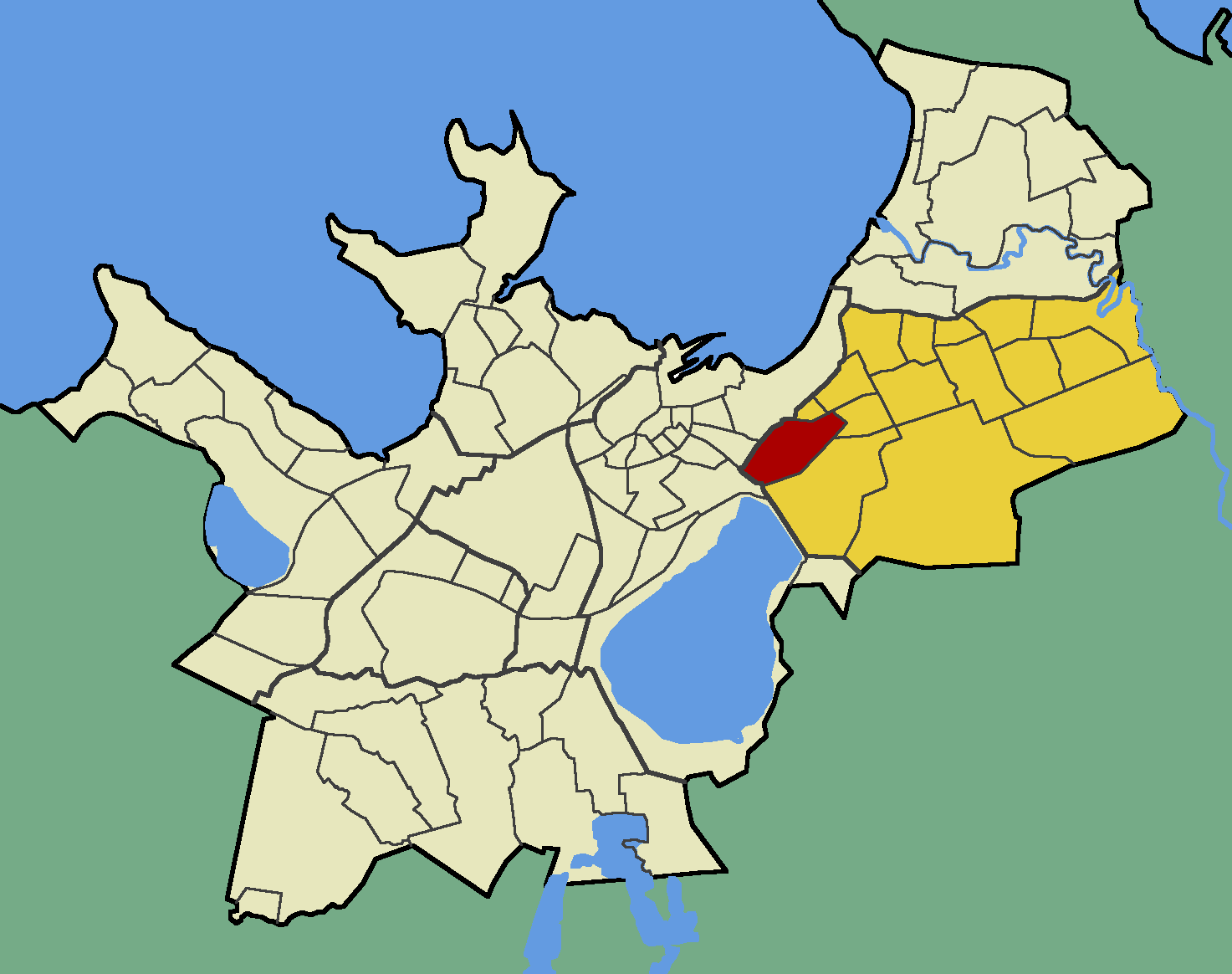
- Sikupilli within Lasnamäe District.
- Country: Estonia
- County: Harju County
- City: Tallinn
- District: Lasnamäe

Population (2022)
  - Total: 12,266

Sikupilli (Estonian for 'bagpipe', literally 'goat instrument') is a subdistrict (asum) in the district of Lasnamäe, Tallinn, the capital of Estonia. It has a population of 12,266 (As of 2022).

== Name ==
The Estonian common noun sikupill literally means 'goat instrument' and is a synonym for torupill 'bagpipe'. There are three hypotheses regarding why the neighborhood was given this name. The architectural and urban historian Robert Nerman suggested that many residents of the area kept goats, and so it was named after their bleating. Another theory connects the name with the neighboring subdistrict of Torupilli. A third hypothesis mentions a pasture named Sikupilli in the Lasnamäe district, suggesting that this name was later extended to the neighborhood.

== Gallery ==
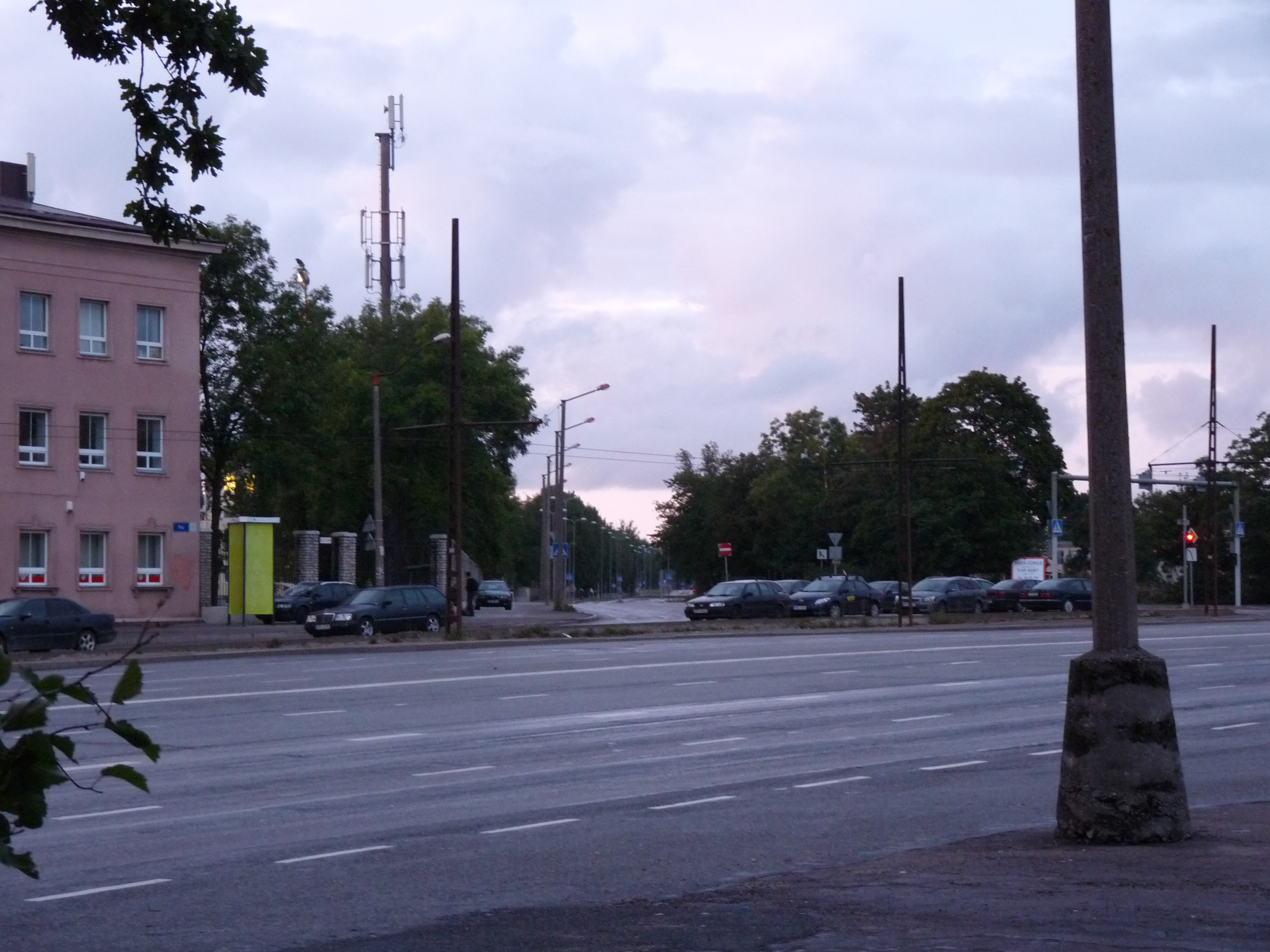
Pae street

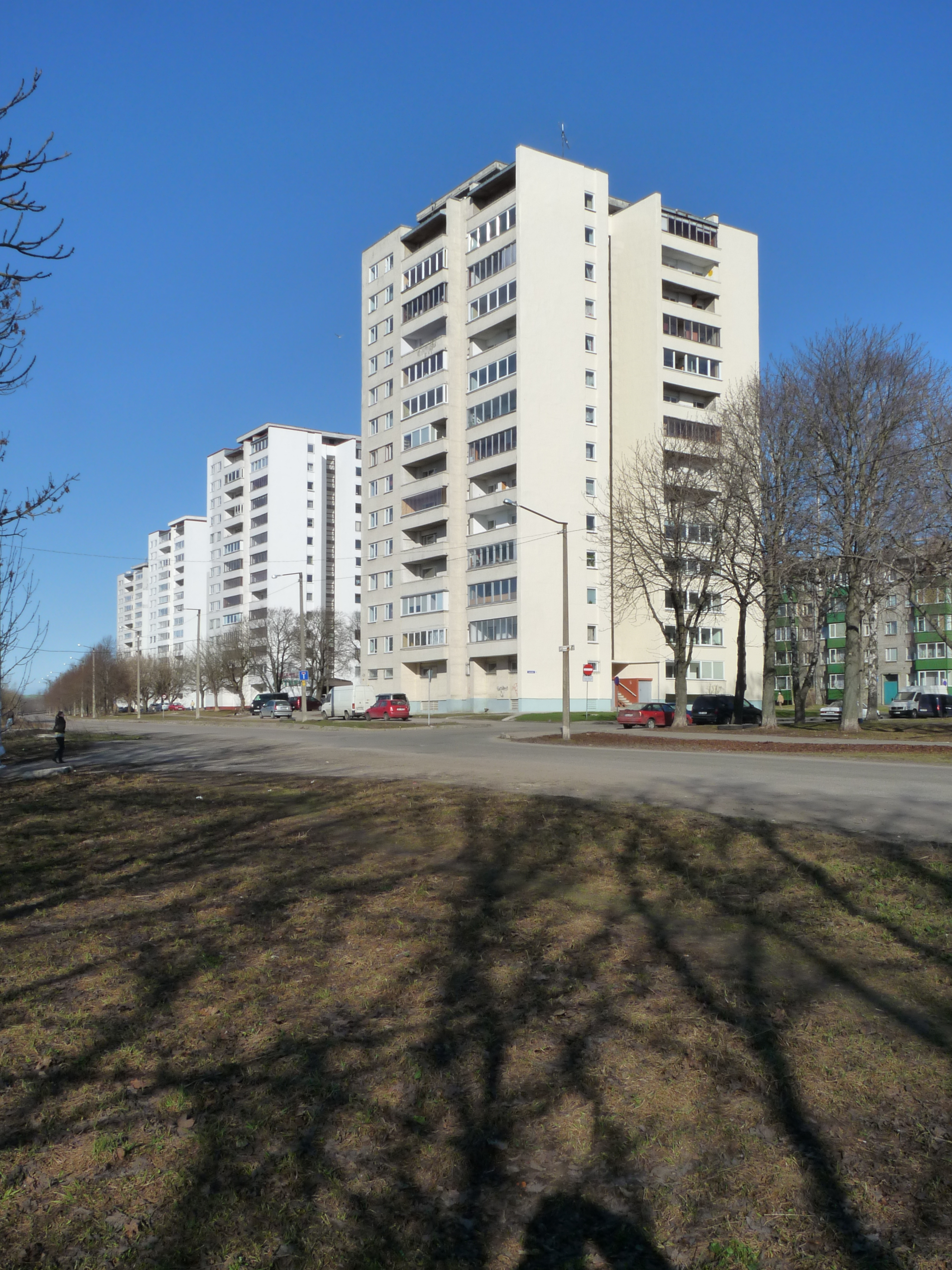
Apartments in Sikupilli

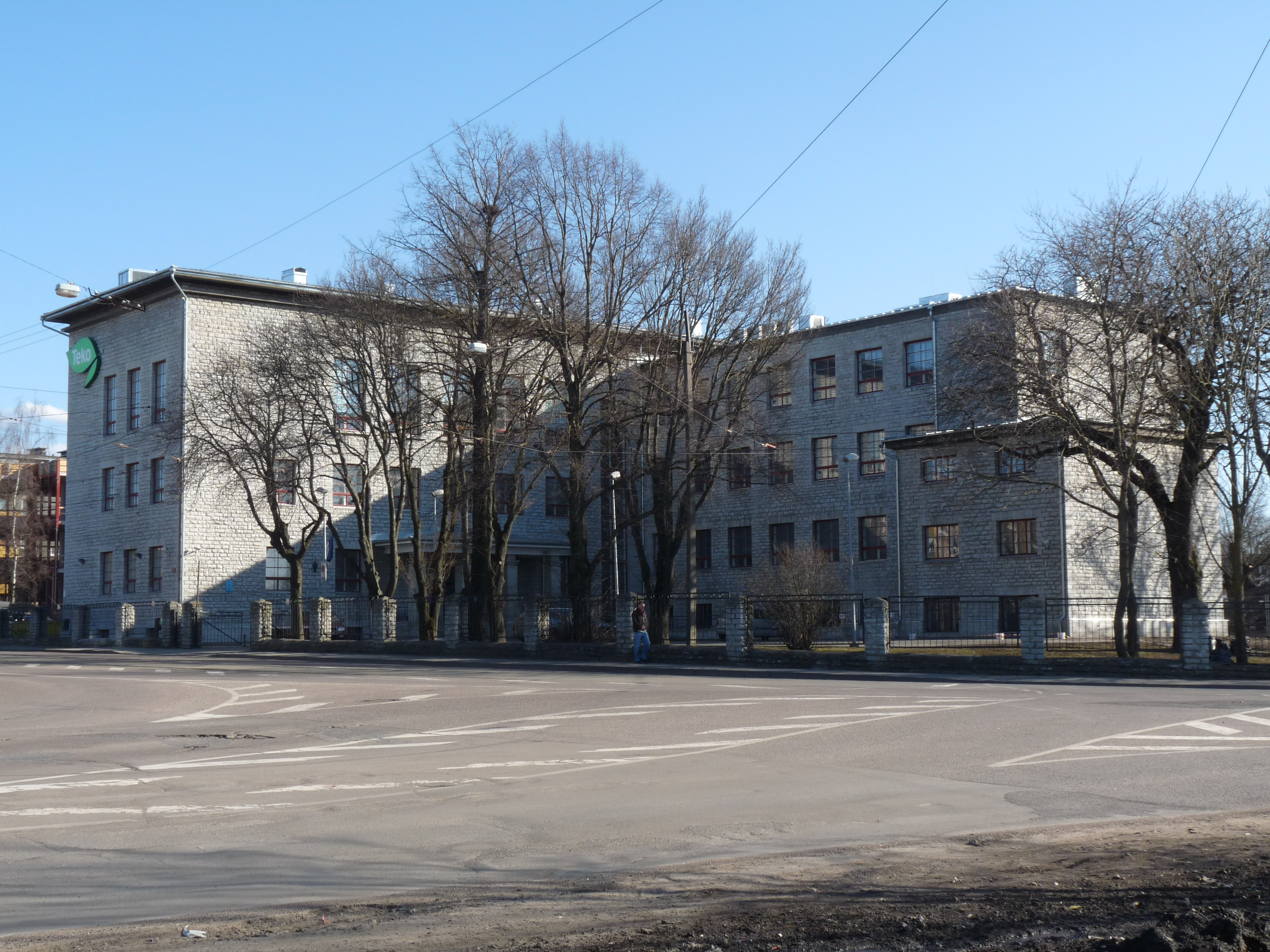
Chef's vocational school
