= Laagna, Tallinn =

Subdistrict of Tallinn, Estonia

Coordinates: 59.440013°N 24.837749°E

Laagna
- Subdistrict of Tallinn
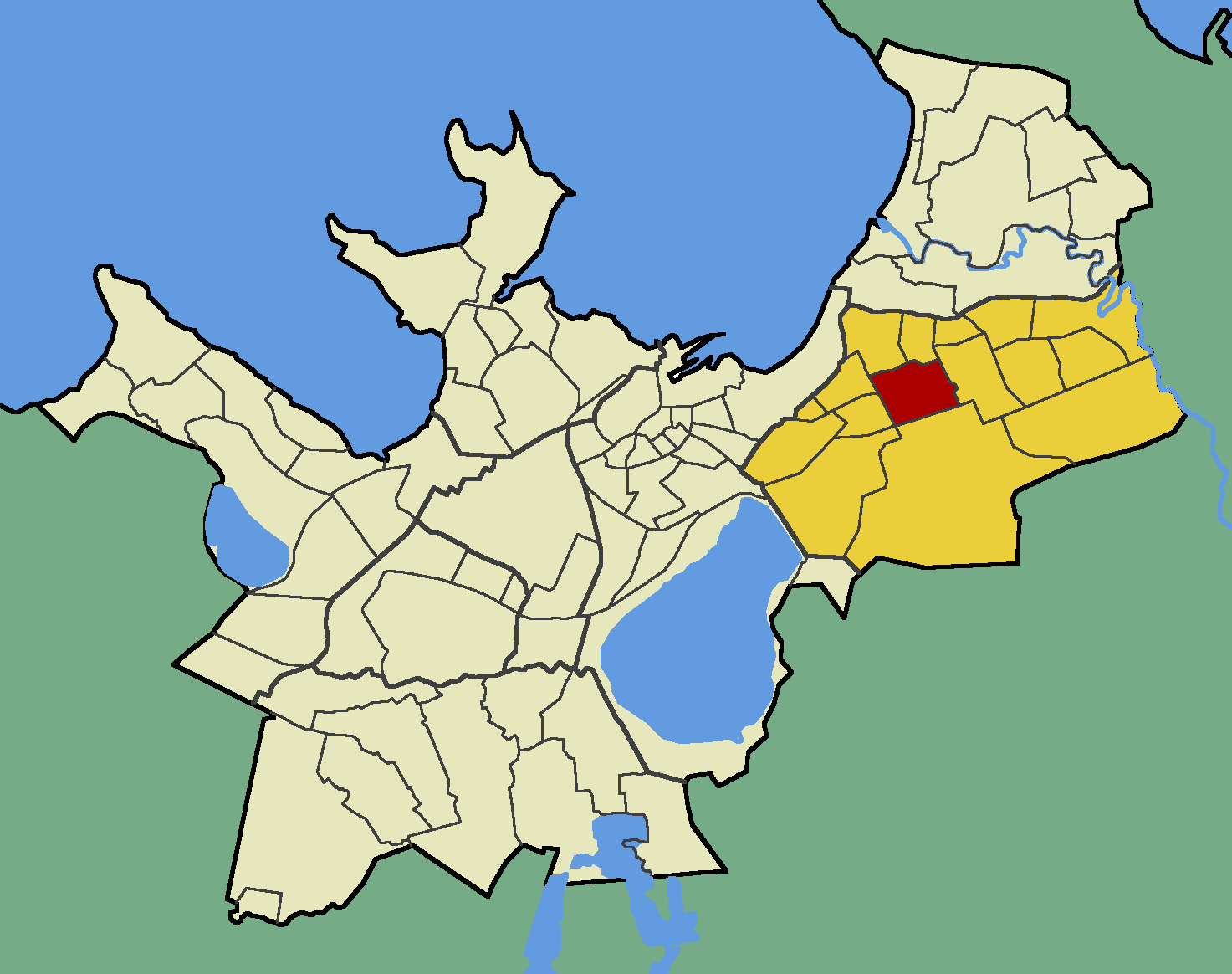
- Laagna within Lasnamäe District.
- Country: Estonia
- County: Harju County
- City: Tallinn
- District: Lasnamäe

Population (01.01.2014)
  - Total: 24,251

Laagna is a subdistrict (Estonian: asum) in the district of Lasnamäe, Tallinn, the capital of Estonia. It has a population of 24,251 (As of 1 January 2014).

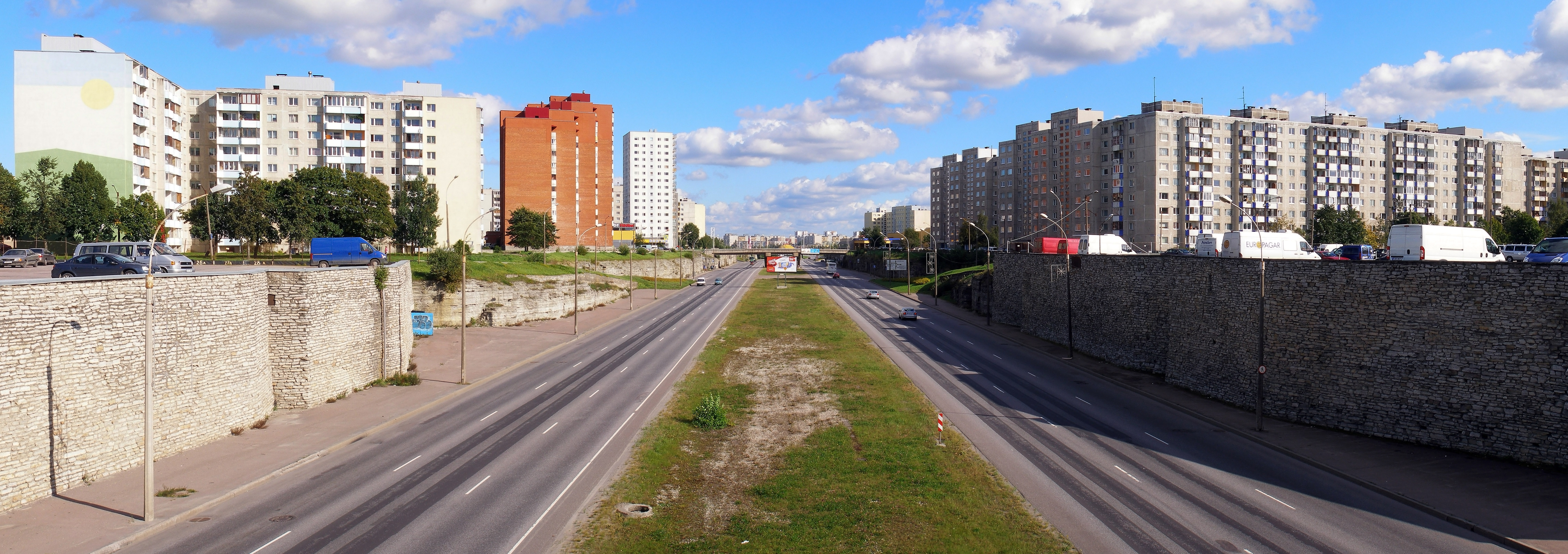
Laagna tee ("Lasnamäe canal").
