= Kurepõllu =

Subdistrict of Tallinn, Estonia

Coordinates: 59.440122°N 24.817268°E

- Subdistrict of Tallinn
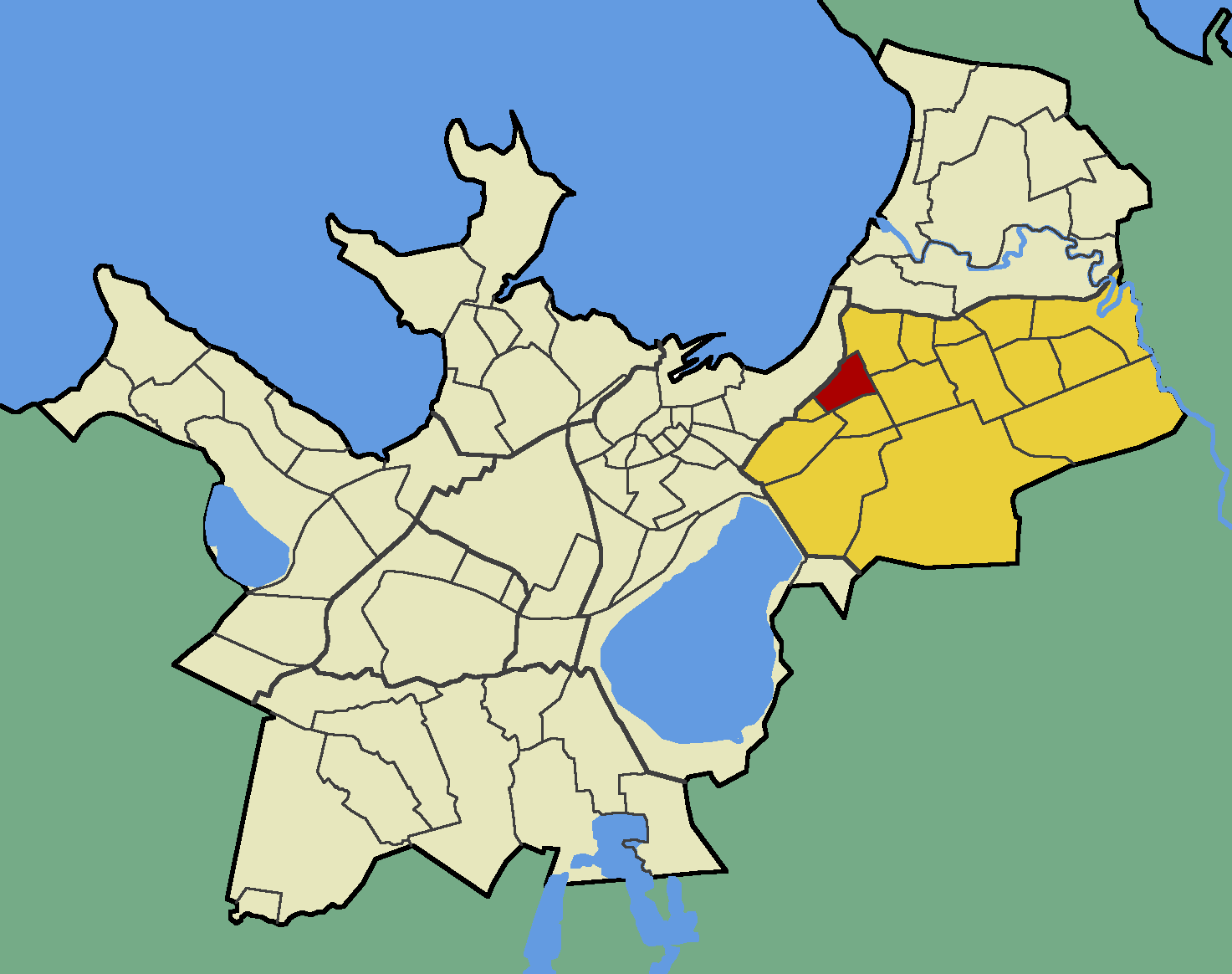
- Kurepõllu within Lasnamäe District.
- Country: Estonia
- County: Harju County
- City: Tallinn
- District: Lasnamäe

Population (01.01.2014)
  - Total: 3,800

Kurepõllu (Estonian for "Crane Field") is a subdistrict (Estonian: asum) in the district of Lasnamäe, Tallinn, the capital of Estonia. It has a population of 3,800 (As of 1 January 2014).

== See also ==
- FC Ajax Lasnamäe

== Gallery ==
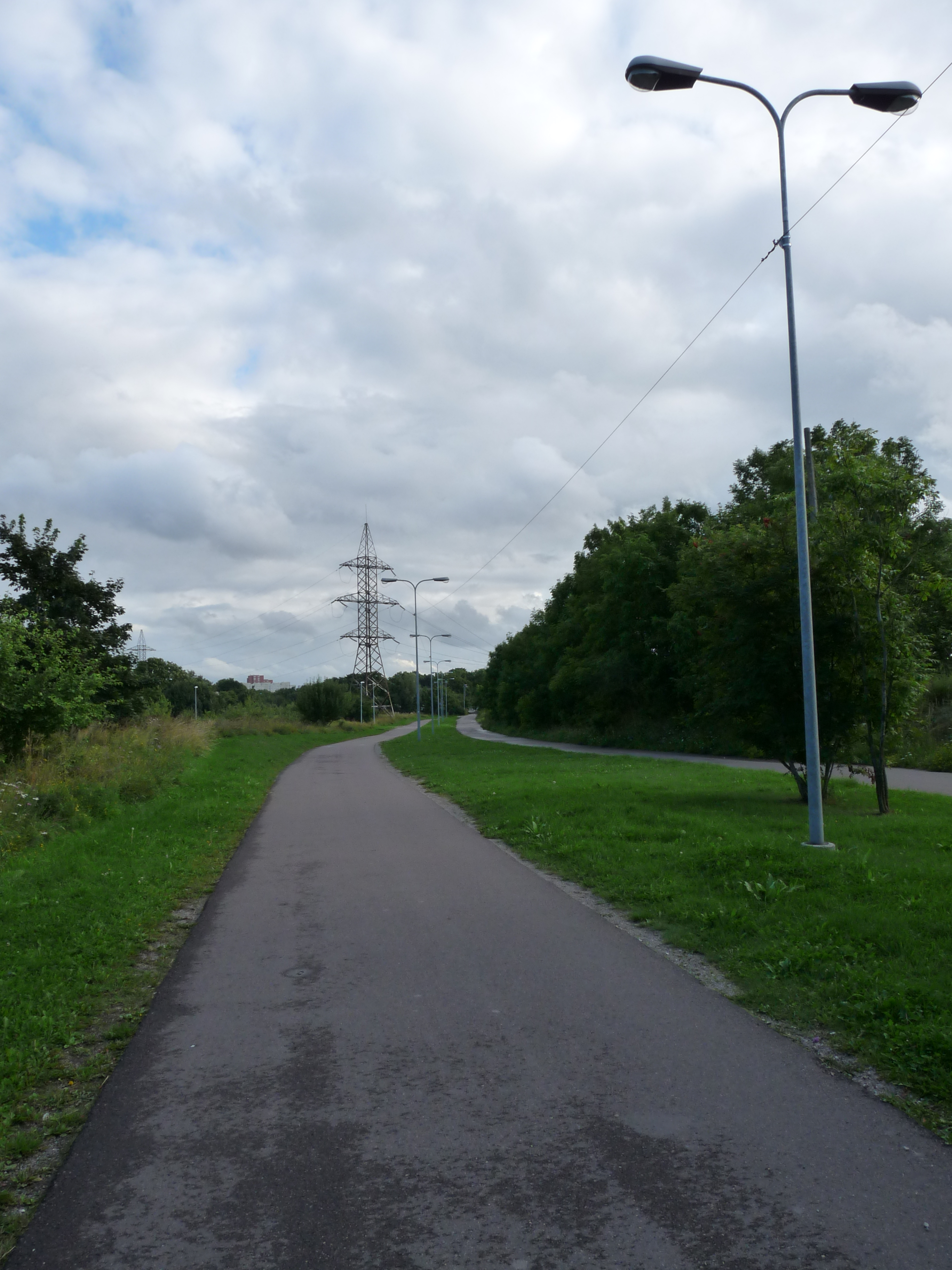
Cycle road in Mäe street

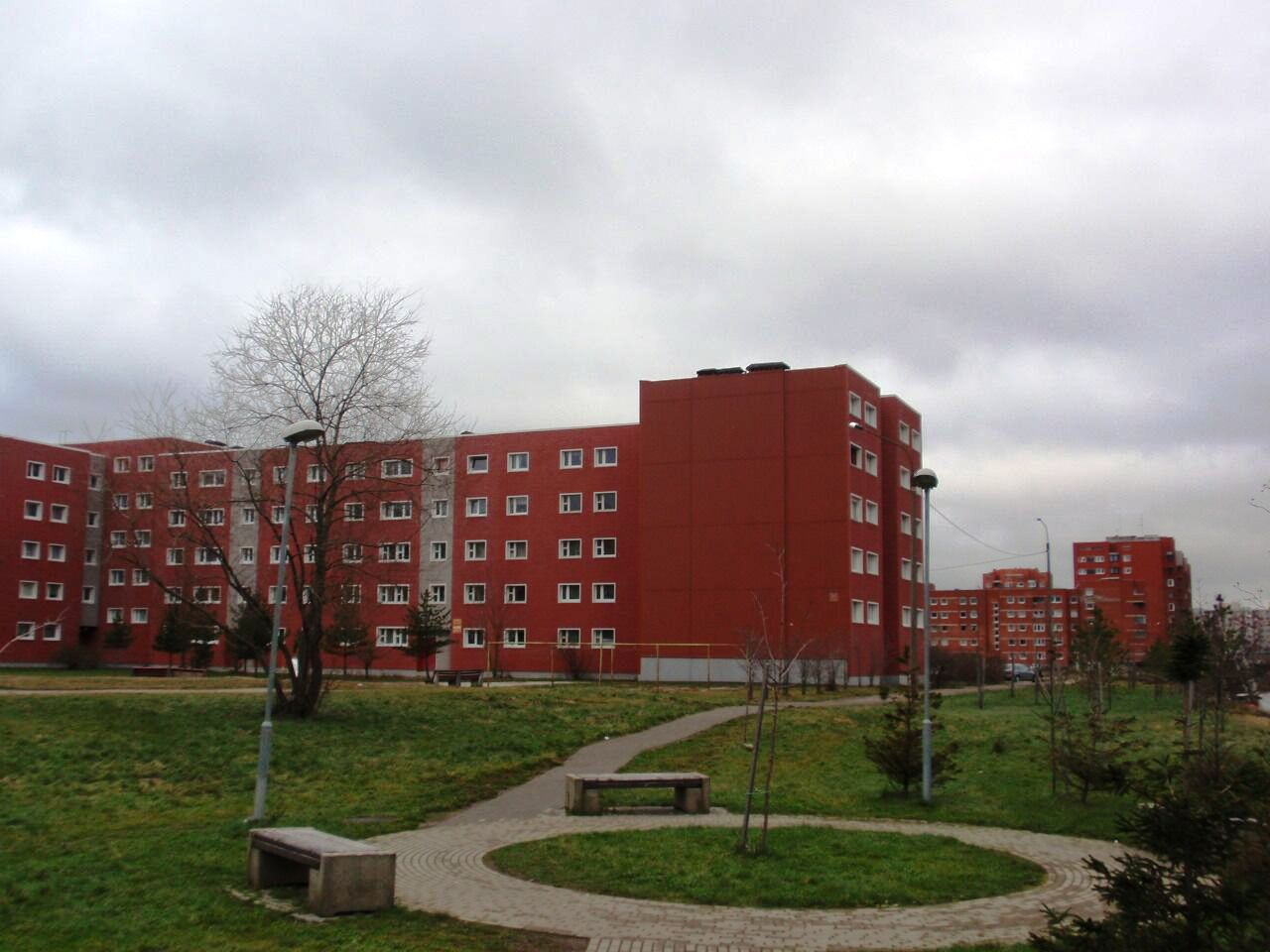
Apartment buildings in Kurepõllu.
