= Seli, Tallinn =

Subdistrict of Tallinn, Estonia

Coordinates: 59.445162°N 24.890299°E

Seli
- Subdistrict of Tallinn
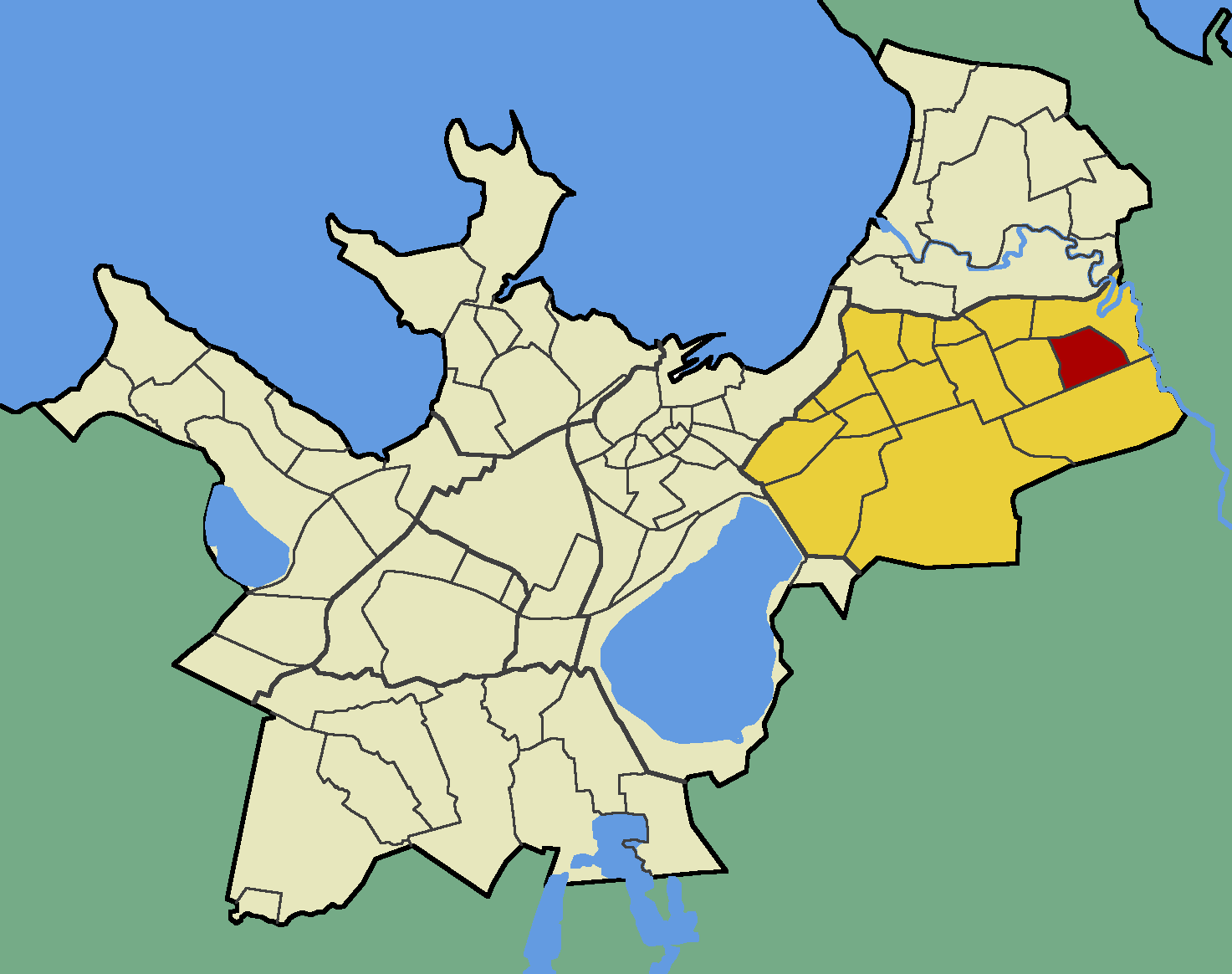
- Seli within Lasnamäe District.
- Country: Estonia
- County: Harju County
- City: Tallinn
- District: Lasnamäe

Population (01.01.2014)
  - Total: 13,039

Seli is a subdistrict (Estonian: asum) in the district of Lasnamäe, Tallinn, the capital of Estonia. It has a population of 13,039 (As of 1 January 2014).
