= Mustakivi =

Subdistrict of Tallinn, Estonia

Coordinates: 59.443057°N 24.87442°E

- Subdistrict of Tallinn
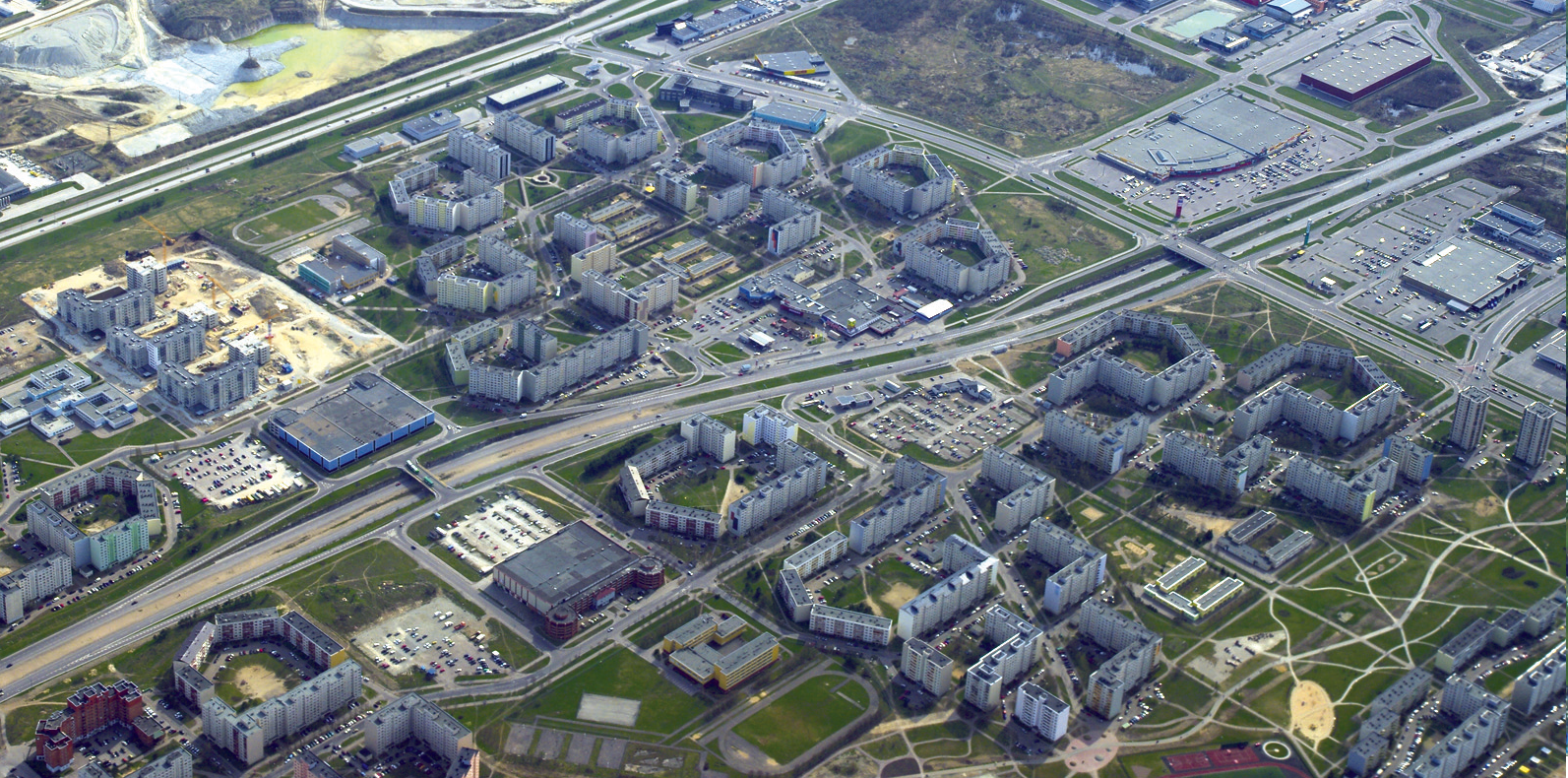
- Aerial view of Mustakivi.

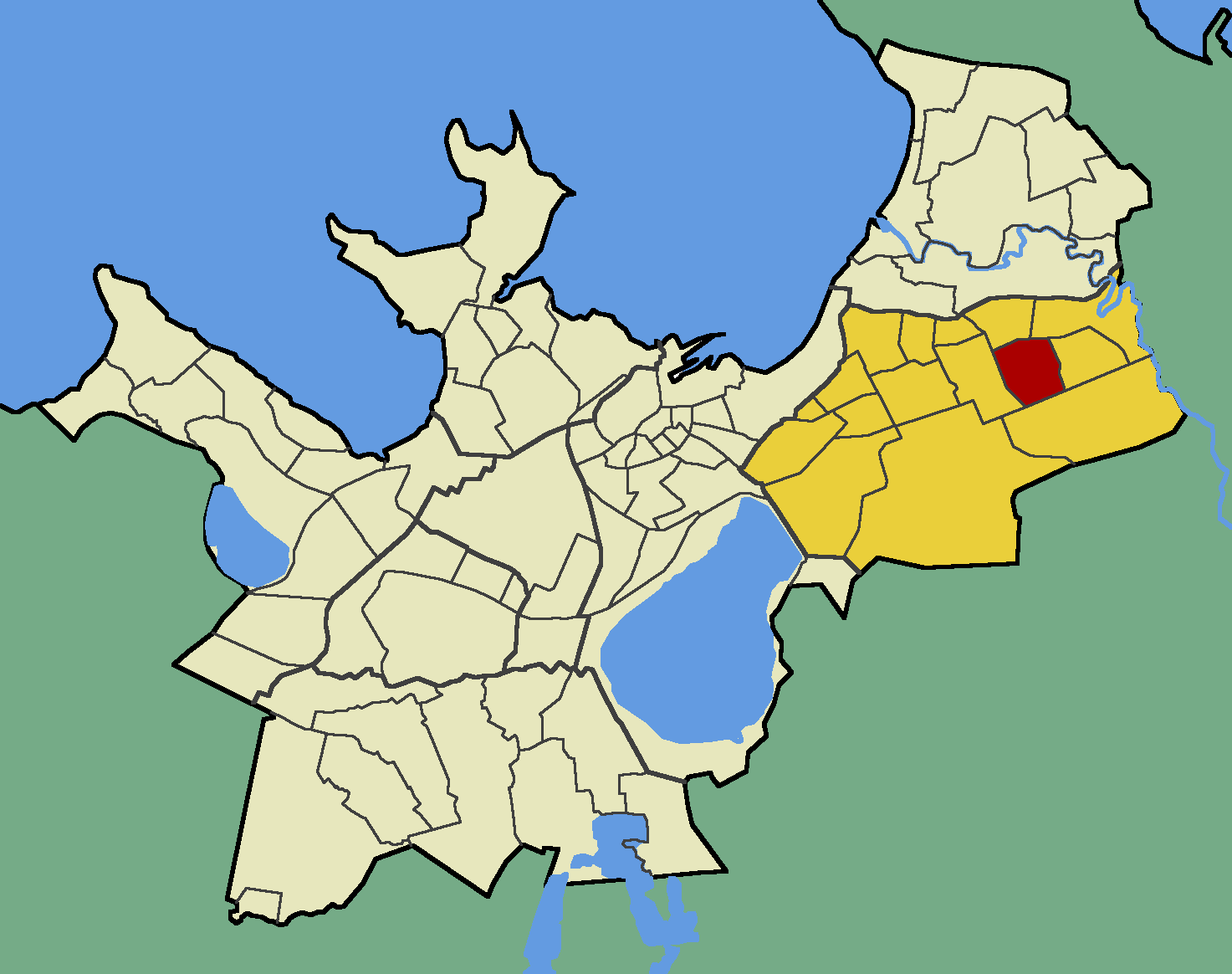
- Mustakivi within Lasnamäe District.
- Country: Estonia
- County: Harju County
- City: Tallinn
- District: Lasnamäe

Population (01.01.2014)
  - Total: 19,759

Mustakivi (Estonian for "Black Stone") is a subdistrict (Estonian: asum) in the district of Lasnamäe, Tallinn, the capital of Estonia. It has a population of 19,759 (As of 1 January 2014).

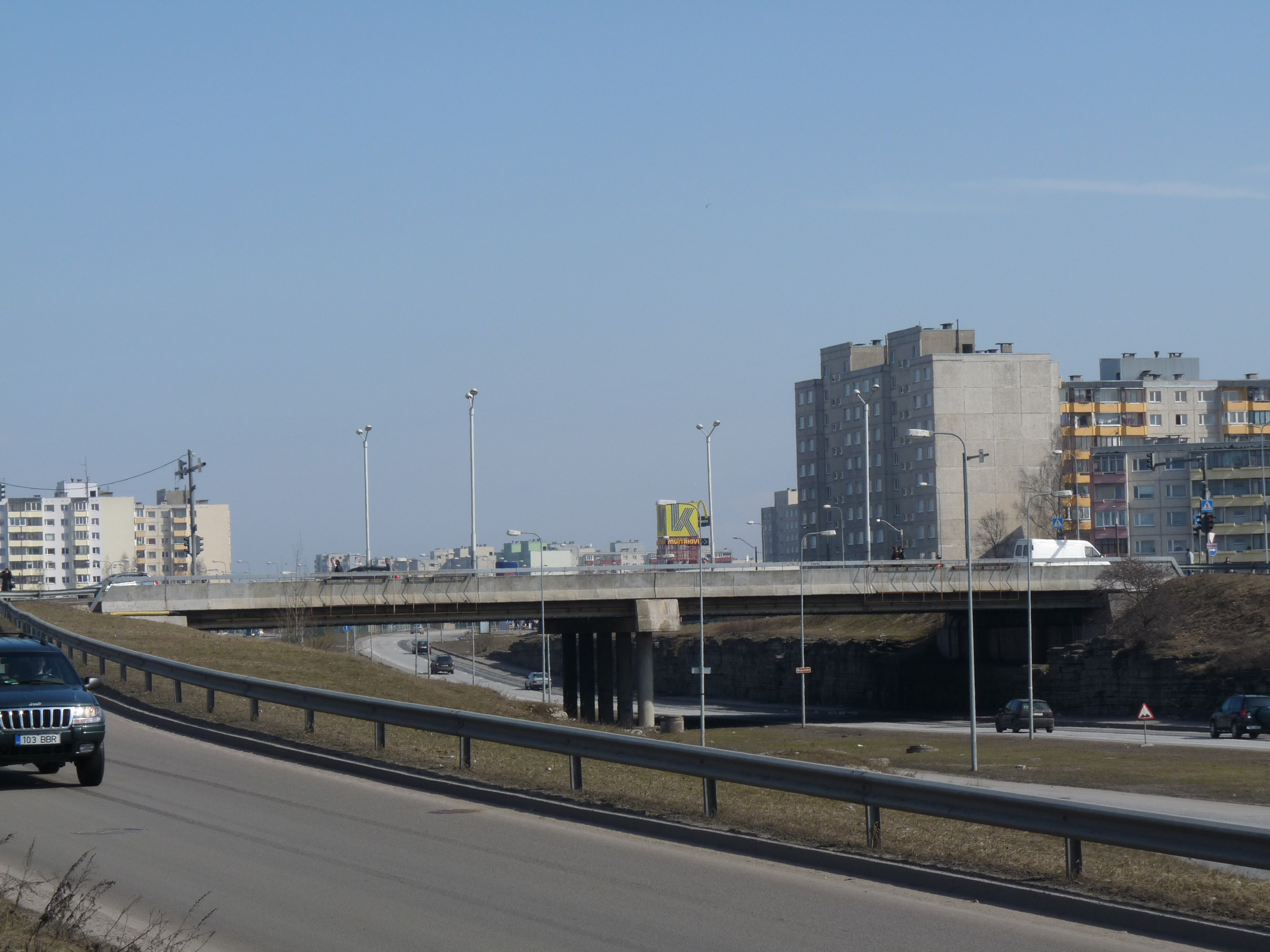
Mustakivi bridge

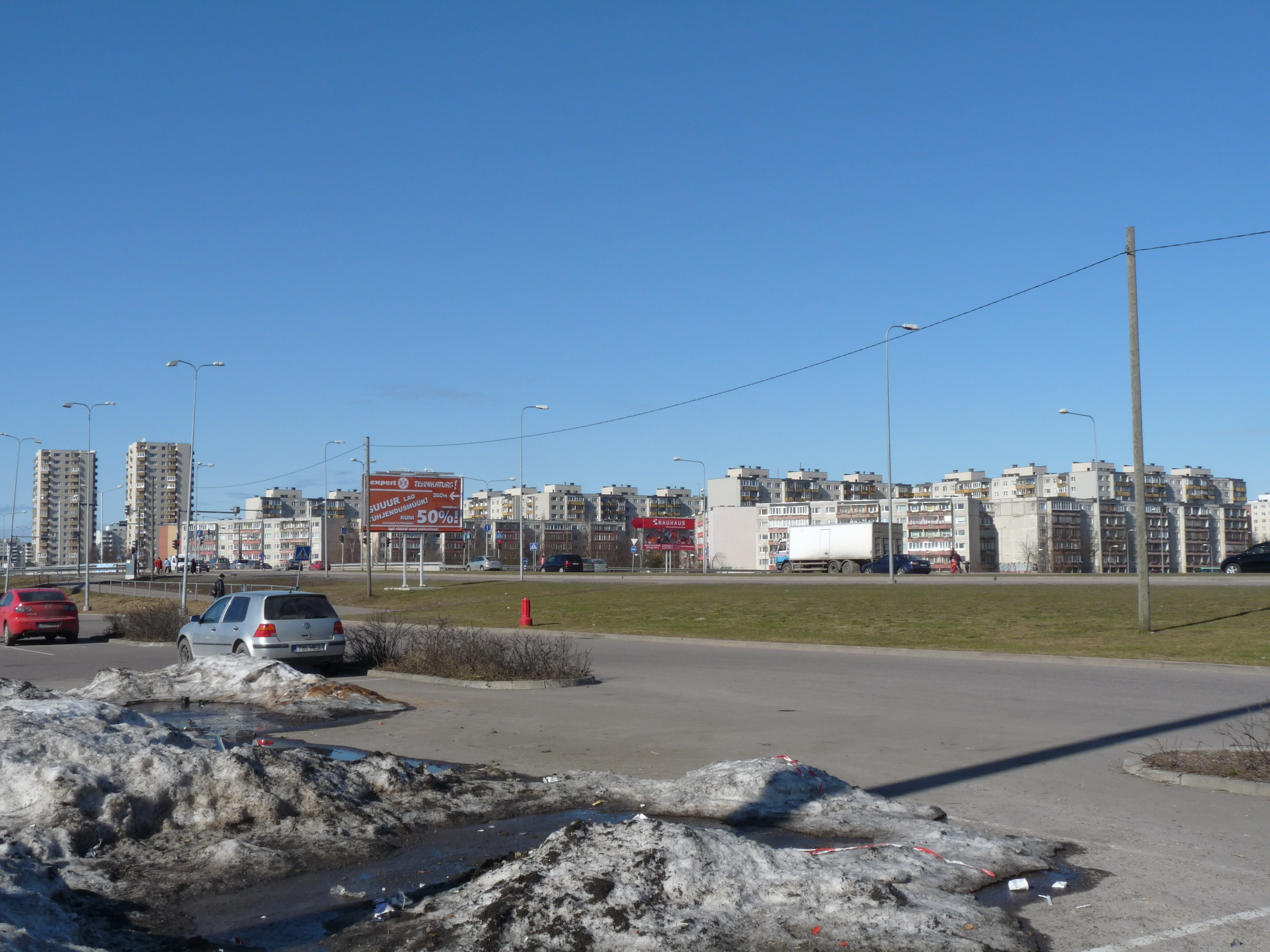
Mustakivi in spring

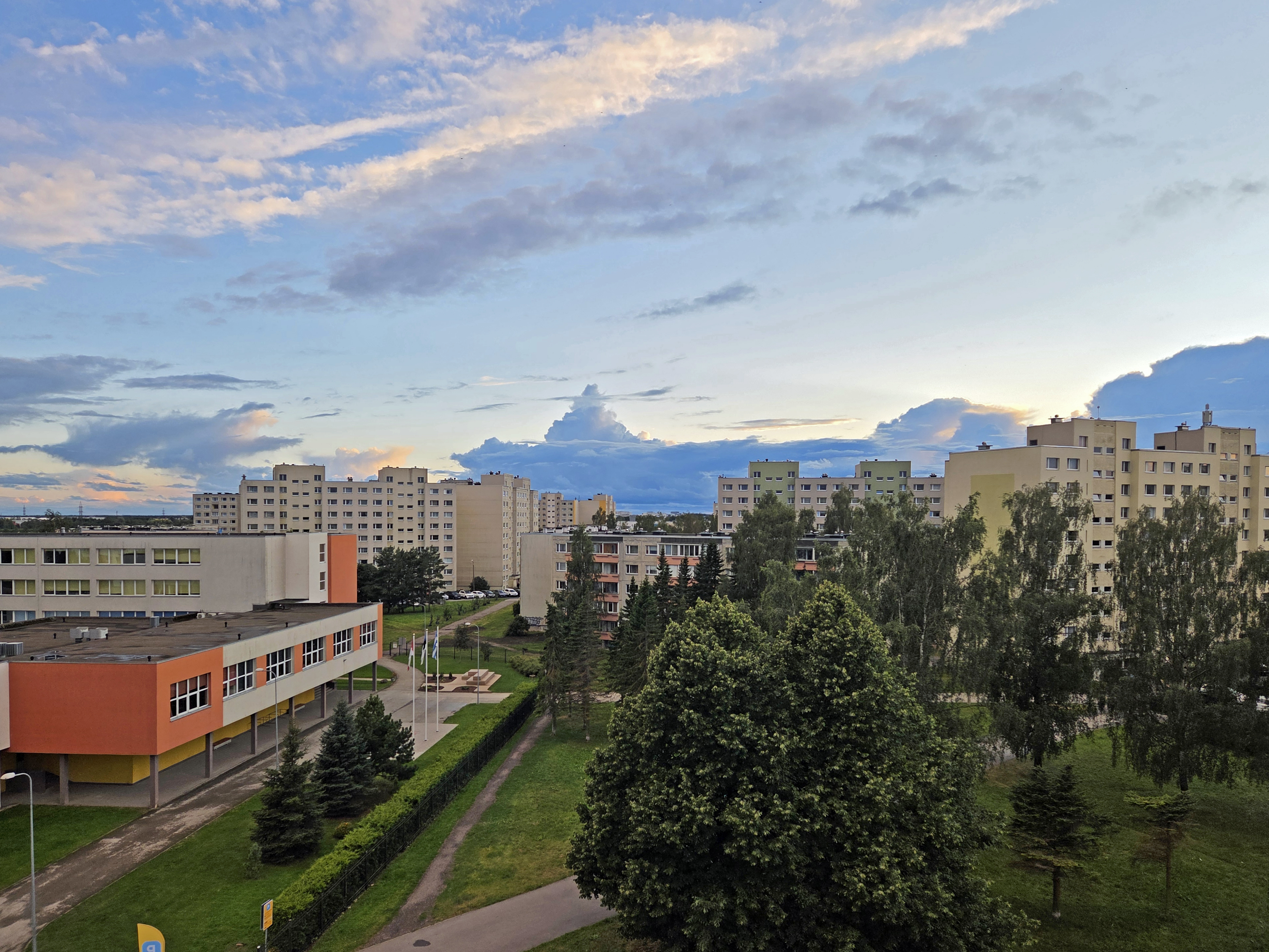
Mustakivi in summer

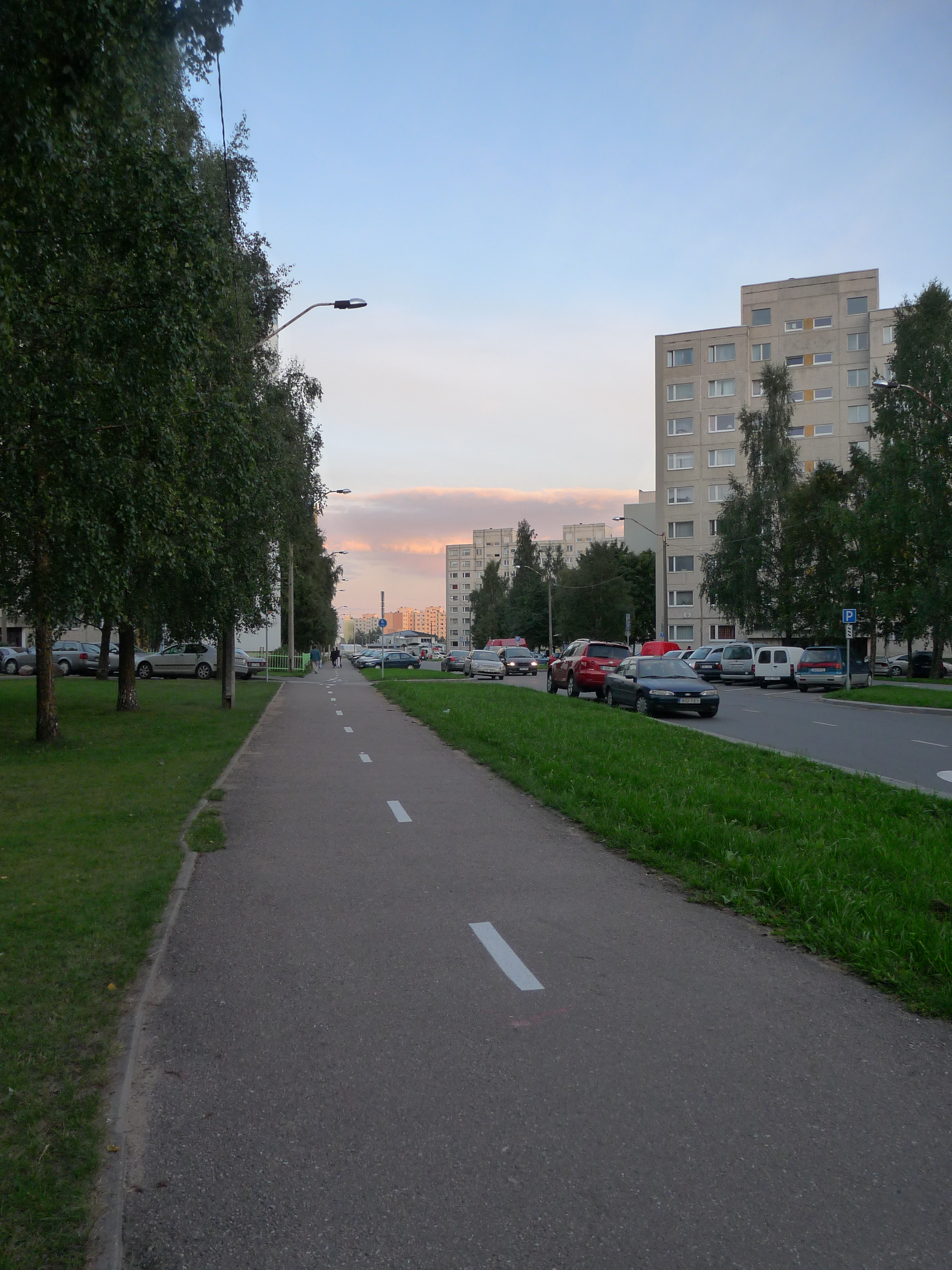
Kivila street

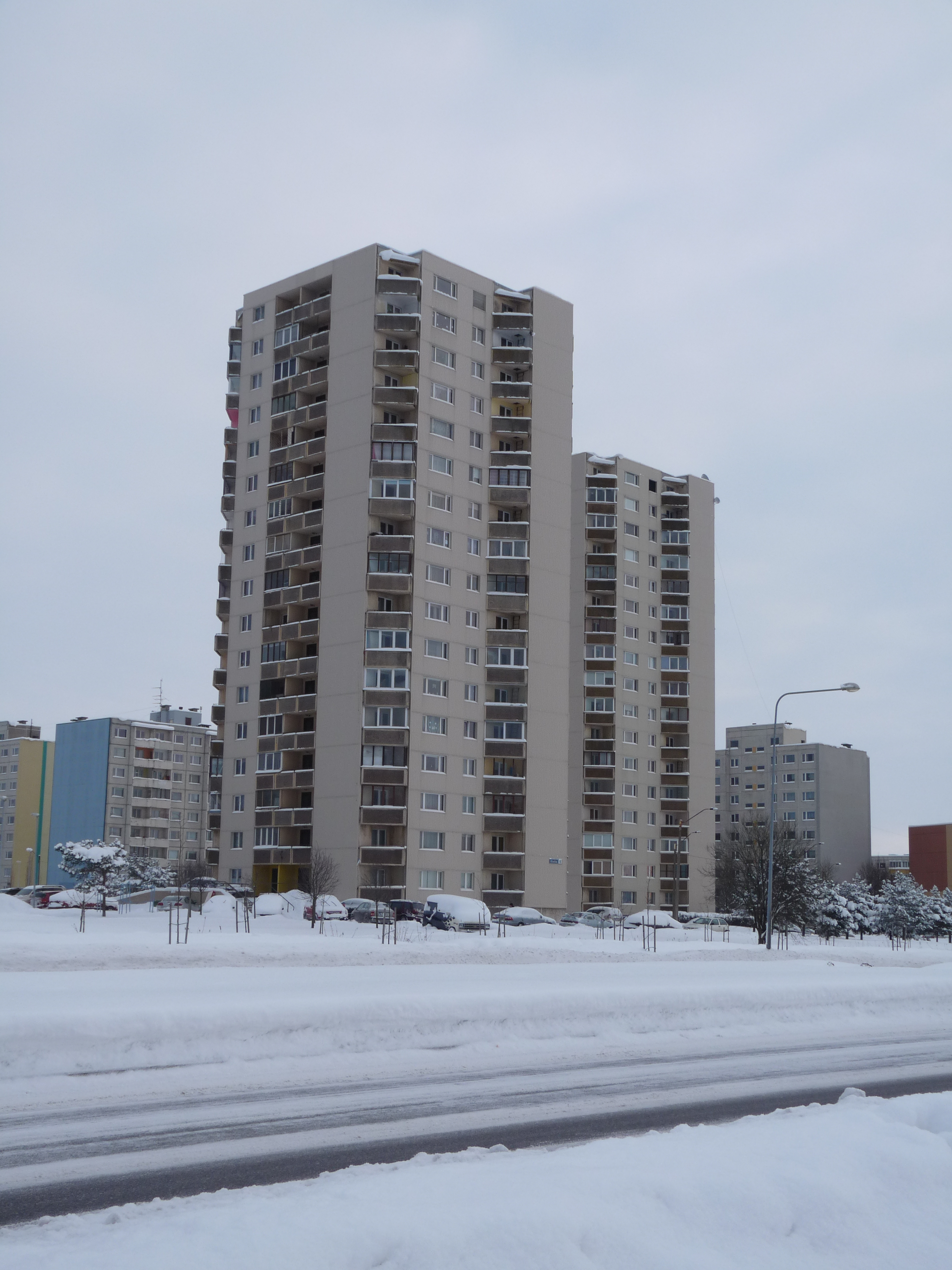
17-storeyed apartment buildings
