= Uuslinn =

Subdistrict of Tallinn, Estonia

Coordinates: 59.437089°N 24.803492°E

- Subdistrict of Tallinn
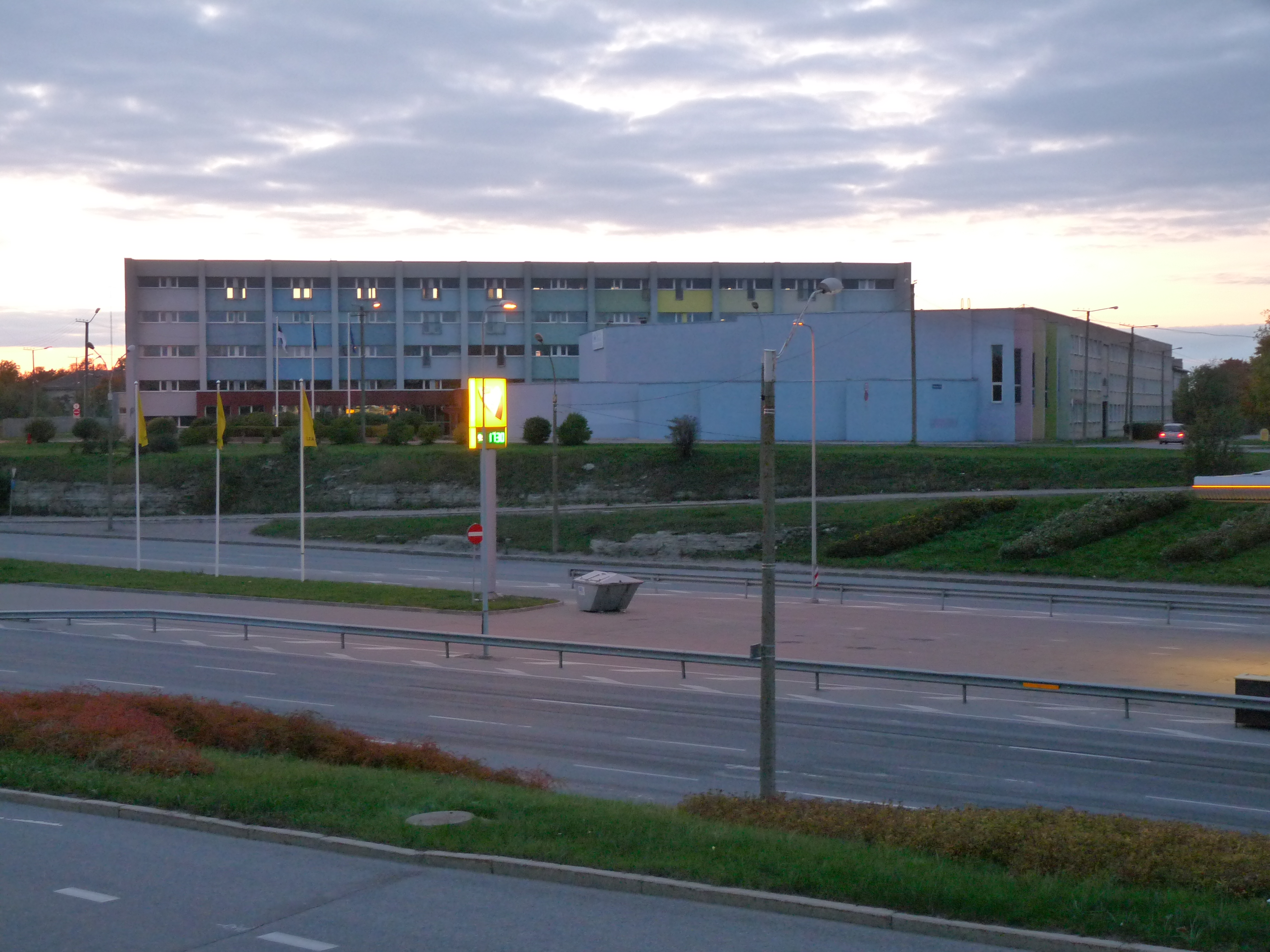
- Tallinn Lasnamäe Mechanical School in Uuslinn.

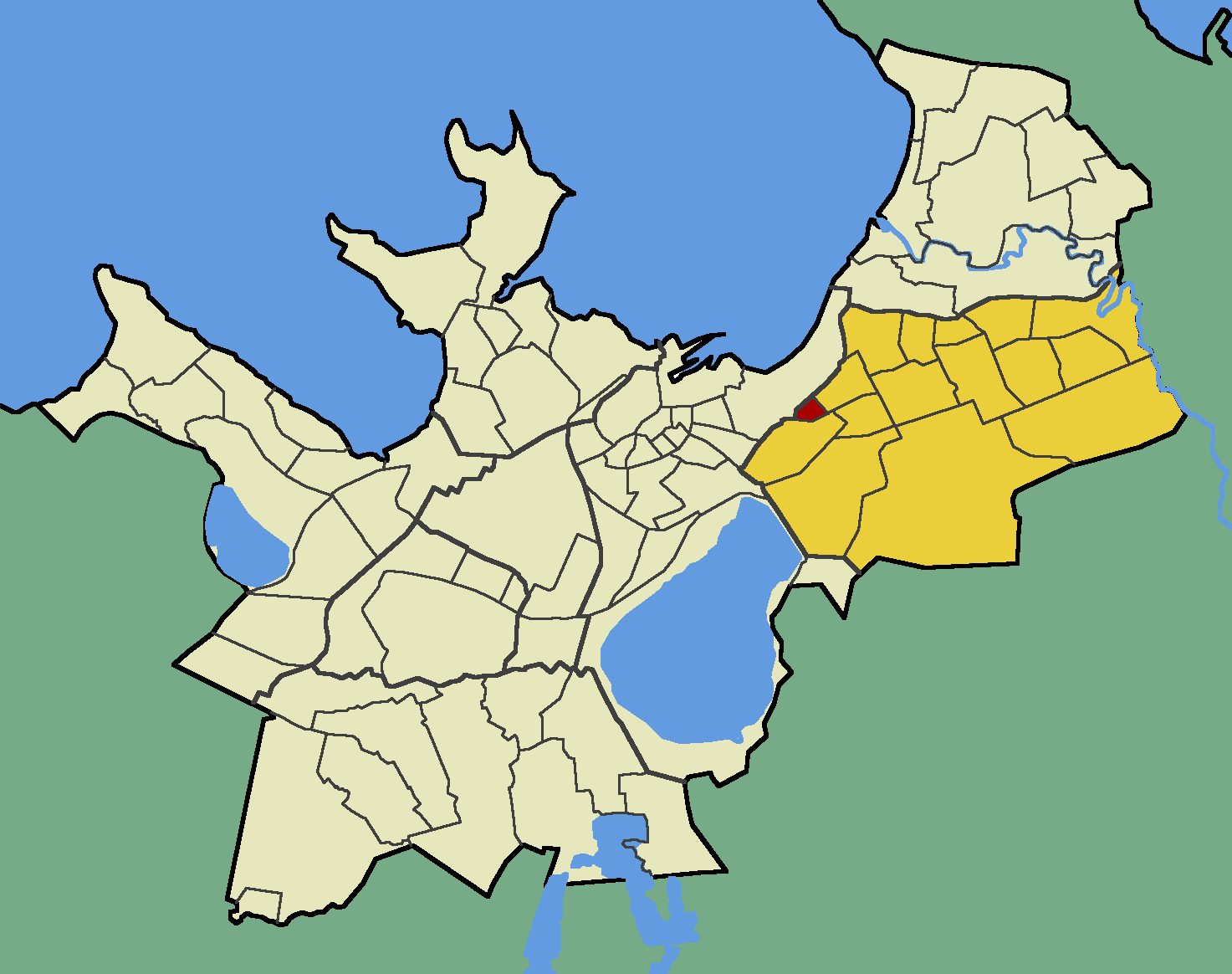
- Uuslinn within Lasnamäe District.
- Country: Estonia
- County: Harju County
- City: Tallinn
- District: Lasnamäe

Population (01.01.2014)
  - Total: 353

Uuslinn (Estonian for "New Town") is a subdistrict (Estonian: asum) in the district of Lasnamäe, Tallinn, the capital of Estonia. It has a population of 353 (As of 1 January 2014).

The headquarters of Estonian Maritime Administration is located at Valge 4 in Uuslinn.
