= Lasnamäe =

District of Tallinn

- District of Tallinn
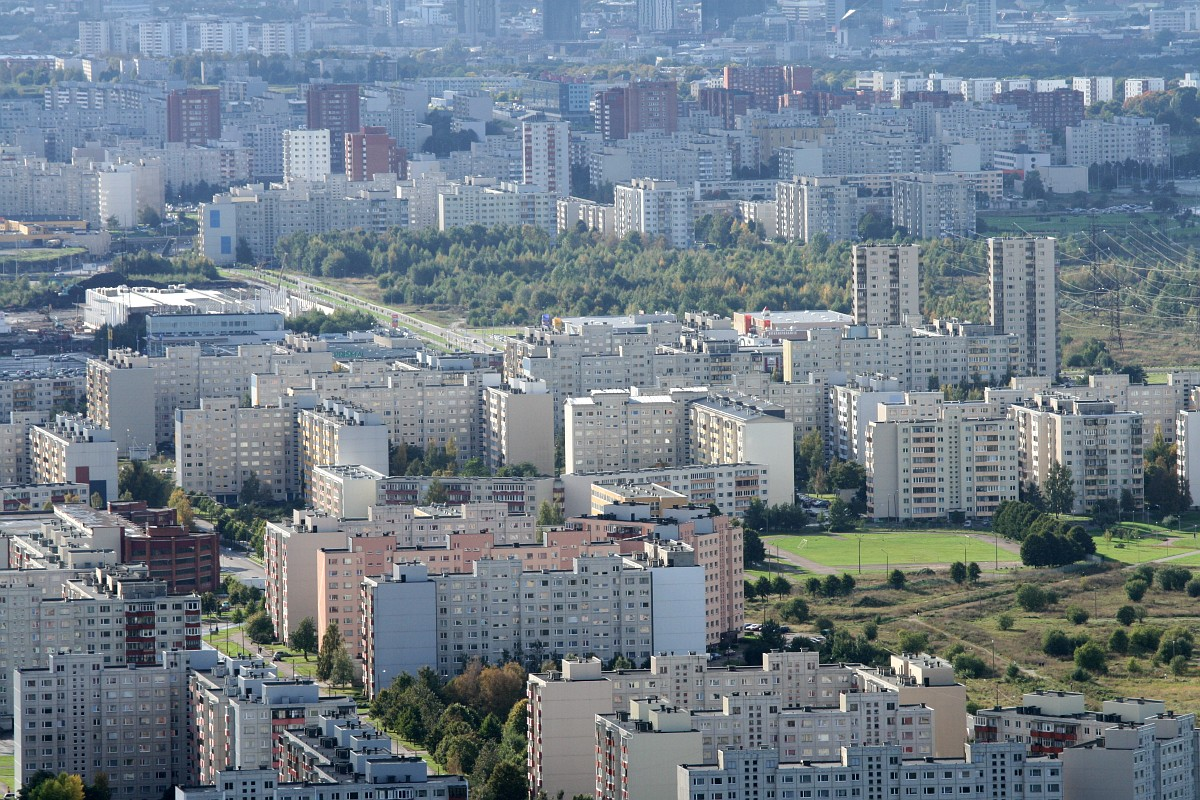
- Lasnamäe seen from the air.

- Flag Coat of arms

- Location of Lasnamäe in Tallinn.
- Coordinates: 59°26′15″N 24°49′39″E
- Country: Estonia
- County: Harju County
- City: Tallinn

Government
  - District Elder: (Social Democratic Party)

Area
  - Total: 30.0 km^{2} (11.6 sq mi)

Population (01.07.2023)
  - Total: 119,695
  - Density: 3,990/km^{2} (10,300/sq mi)
- Website: tallinn.ee

	Pirita
Kesklinn	Lasnamäe

Lasnamäe is the most populous administrative district of Tallinn, the capital of Estonia. The district's population is about 119,000, the majority of which is Russian-speaking as a result of Soviet settlement policies. Local housing is mostly represented by 5–16 stories high panel blocks of flats, built in the 1970–1990s.

The district lies in the eastern part of Tallinn. In the east it is bordered by the Pirita River; in the north and northwest a limestone escarpment (part of the Baltic Klint) separates Lasnamäe from Pirita and Kesklinn. The district is situated on a flat limestone plateau that lies 30–52 m above sea level. The highest point in Lasnamäe is the Sõjamägi Hill at 54 m asl.

Lasnamäe can be divided into two distinct areas: the northern part is residential, while the southern part around Peterburi Road (Tallinn-Narva road, part of E20) and up to the border with Rae Parish is mainly industrial. Lennart Meri Tallinn Airport is also administratively located in Lasnamäe.

== History ==
The oldest traces of human activity in the Lasnamäe area date from the Early Neolithic period.

In the Middle Ages some small hamlets were situated on the territory of present-day Lasnamäe. At that time Lasnamäe was mainly known for limestone quarries, as nearly all of medieval Tallinn was built from local limestone.

At the end of the 19th century, during the period of industrial expansion, some major factories were set up in Lasnamäe, including the Dvigatel factory, which had 2,260 workers in 1900. In 1904 Sikupilli, the first residential suburb in Lasnamäe, was laid out. Sikupilli remained the main residential area of Lasnamäe until the construction of microdistricts started in the 1970s.

Construction of pre-fabricated concrete apartment blocks under the concept of microdistrict, for which Lasnamäe is best known today, started in 1973 and proceeded on a massive scale from 1977. This process lasted until the restoration of Estonian independence and completely changed the environment in Lasnamäe. According to initial plans, Lasnamäe was planned to house 160,000–180,000 people. Several subdistricts – e.g. Katleri, Mustakivi, Priisle, Seli – inherited their names from the farms or hamlets on whose territory they were built.

Very few Estonians could get an apartment in Lasnamäe, as most were given to Russian immigrants. During the Singing Revolution in the late 1980s, the combination of the grim mass housing and dominant Russian-speaking migrant population led to calls among ethnic Estonians to ‘stop Lasnamäe’. The phrase Peatage Lasnamäe!, taken from the popular song Mingem üles mägedele performed by Ivo Linna, became one of the slogans of the Singing Revolution.

During the 1990s there was little development in Lasnamäe and the district fell into a standstill. Compared to other areas in Tallinn, it attracted little investment and had the lowest property prices. In recent years the situation has changed – many new apartment blocks have been built in the district, both by the municipal government and private investors, as well as several large supermarkets.

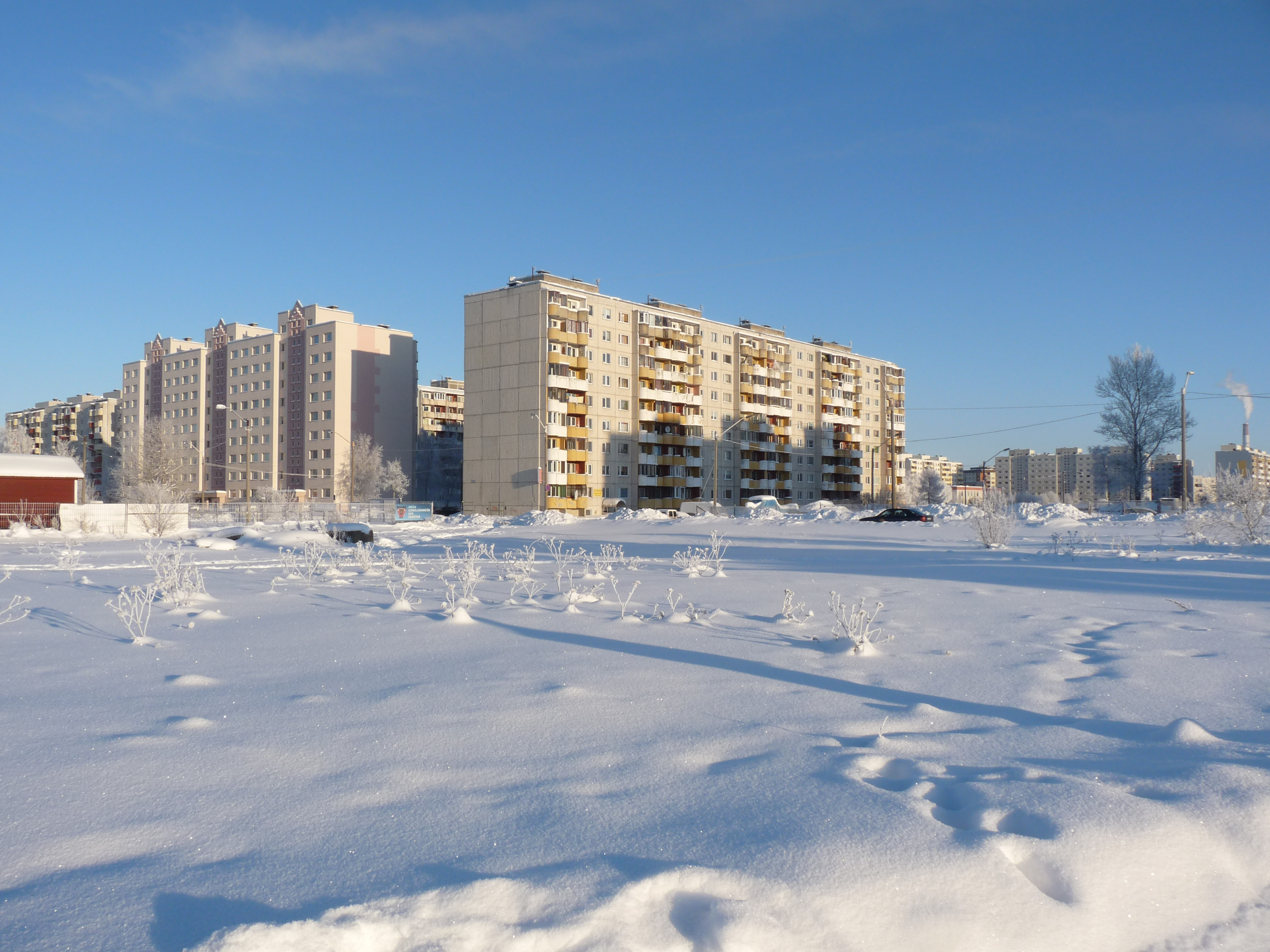
Apartment blocks in Priisle

== Population ==
The population of Lasnamäe is 119,695 (As of 1 July 2023), which comprises 26% of the total population of Tallinn. Lasnamäe is by far the city's most populous district – the next largest, Mustamäe, has 68 500 inhabitants.

The population of Lasnamäe is predominantly Russian-speaking – in 2021, 57.5% of its inhabitants were ethnically Russian, 5.1% Ukrainian and 2.3% Belarusian. Ethnic Estonians make up 28.3% of the population, down from 31.1% in 2005. 65% of Lasnamäe's inhabitants had Estonian citizenship.

Ethnic composition 1989-2021
Ethnicity	1989		2000		2011		2021	
Ethnicity	amount	%	amount	%	amount	%	amount	%
Estonians	36887	31.7	40019	34.7	31806	29.4	32567	28.3
Russians	62887	54.1	60164	52.2	64087	59.3	66090	57.5
Ukrainians	-	-	-	-	5067	4.69	5914	5.14
Belarusians	-	-	-	-	2806	2.60	2672	2.32
Finns	-	-	-	-	515	0.48	531	0.46
Jews	-	-	-	-	401	0.37	356	0.31
Latvians	-	-	-	-	207	0.19	471	0.41
Germans	-	-	-	-	157	0.15	221	0.19
Tatars	-	-	-	-	451	0.42	442	0.38
Poles	-	-	-	-	319	0.30	321	0.28
Lithuanians	-	-	-	-	293	0.27	361	0.31
unknown	0	0.00	1049	0.91	174	0.16	1564	1.36
other	16428	14.1	14011	12.2	1759	1.63	3528	3.07
Total	116202	100	115243	100	108042	100	115038	100

Population development
Year	2004	2005	2006	2007	2008	2009	2010	2011	2012	2013	2014	2015	2016	2017	20182019	2020	2021	2022	2023	
Population	112,368	114,440	114,142	112,306	112,001	113,332	114,258	115,654	116,273	116,490	118,211	118,437	118,776	119,180	119,701	120,408	117,955	118,047	117,230	119,092

== Transport ==
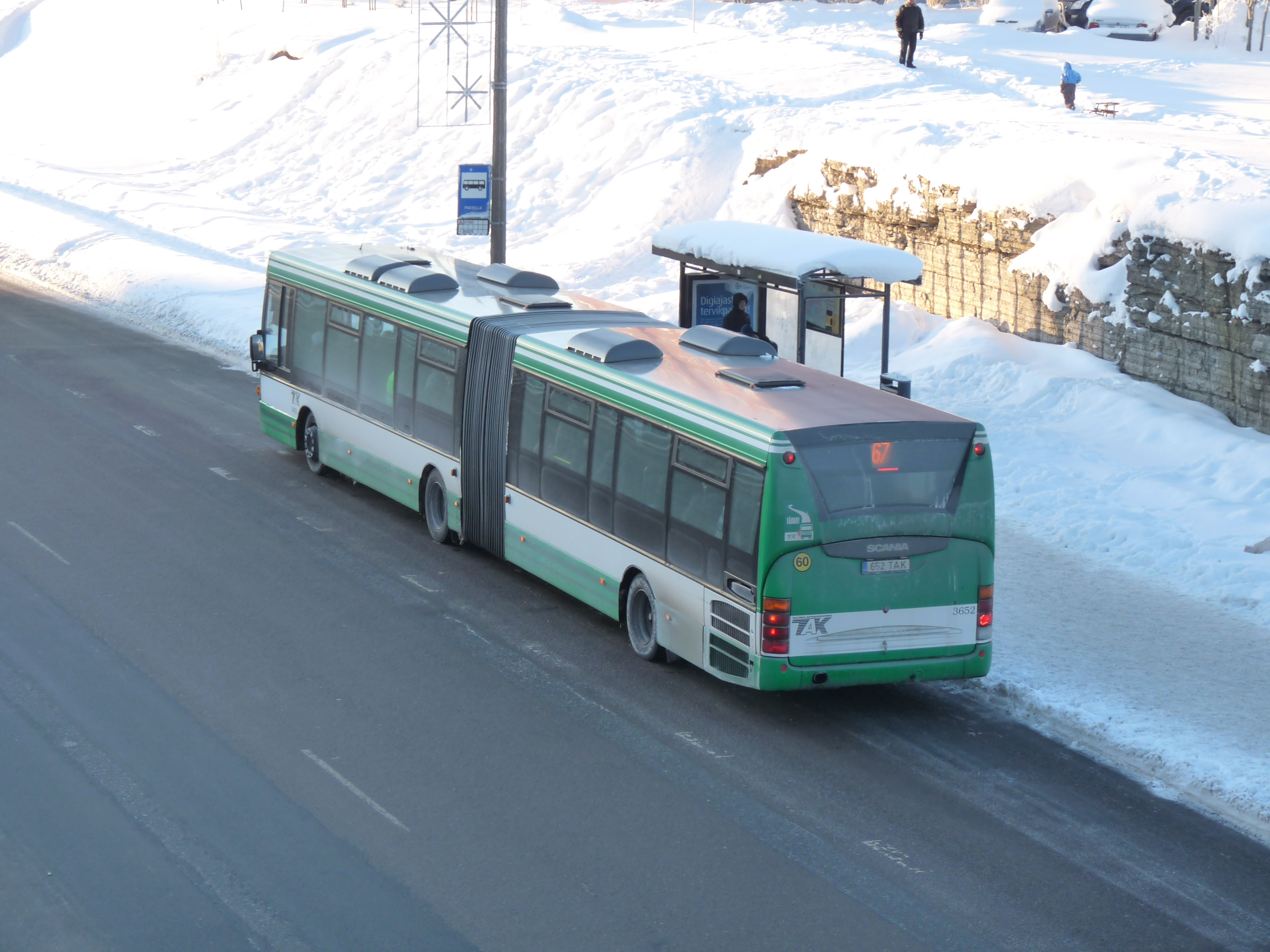
Bus No.67 in Laagna street

The main road in Lasnamäe is the 4+4 Laagna Road, which runs in an east–west direction through the district and connects it at one end to the city centre, and at the other end to the Tallinn-Narva highway (E20) and Tallinn ring road (E265) at Väo. For most of its course the road is situated in a cutting in the limestone plateau. This has earned the road its nickname – Lasnamäe Channel (Estonian: Lasnamäe kanal) or simply The Channel. It was a location for the filming of Christopher Nolan's Tenet.

=== Public transport ===
A tram line services the older part of Lasnamäe (Sikupilli and Ülemiste subdistricts). The newer parts of Lasnamäe rely on a number of bus routes operated by the Tallinn Bus Company. A light rail line that would connect the bulk of Lasnamäe to the city centre was planned to be built already during the Soviet Era and with that in mind the Laagna Road was built with a wide central reservation. Despite 30 years of talking, the light rail line remains to be built.

== Subdistricts ==
Lasnamäe is divided into 16 subdistricts: Katleri, Kurepõllu, Kuristiku, Laagna, Loopealse, Mustakivi, Pae, Paevälja, Priisle, Seli, Sikupilli, Sõjamäe, Tondiraba, Uuslinn, Väo, Ülemiste.

== Sports ==
FC Tallinn and FC Ajax Lasnamäe are football clubs based in Lasnamäe.
