= Paevälja =

Subdistrict of Tallinn, Estonia

Coordinates: 59.44754°N 24.824113°E

- Subdistrict of Tallinn
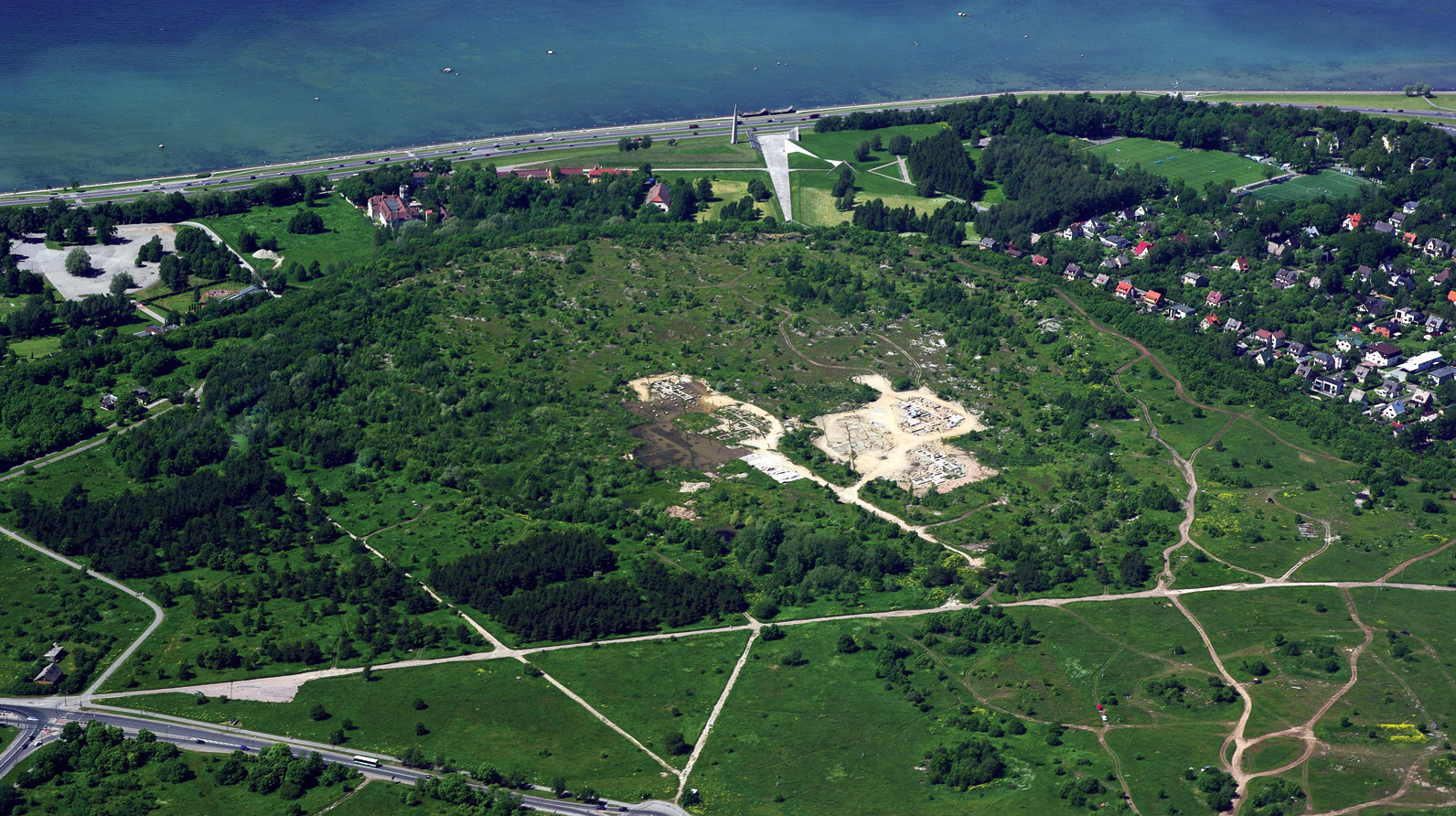
- Aerial view of the northern part of Paevälja.

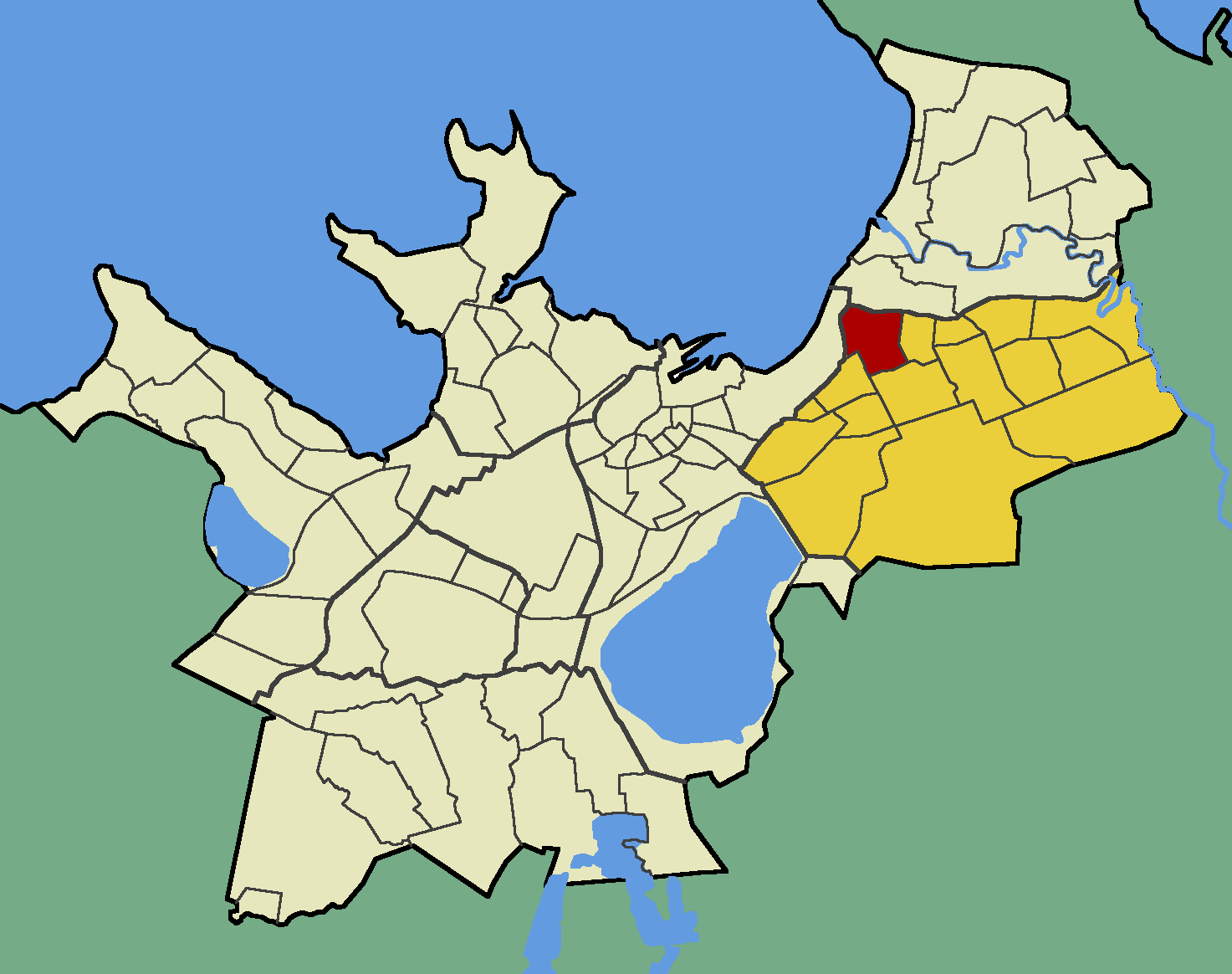
- Paevälja within Lasnamäe District.
- Country: Estonia
- County: Harju County
- City: Tallinn
- District: Lasnamäe

Population (01.01.2014)
  - Total: 469

Paevälja (Estonian for "Limestone Field") is a subdistrict (Estonian: asum) in the district of Lasnamäe, Tallinn, the capital of Estonia. It has a population of 469 (As of 1 January 2014).

== Gallery ==
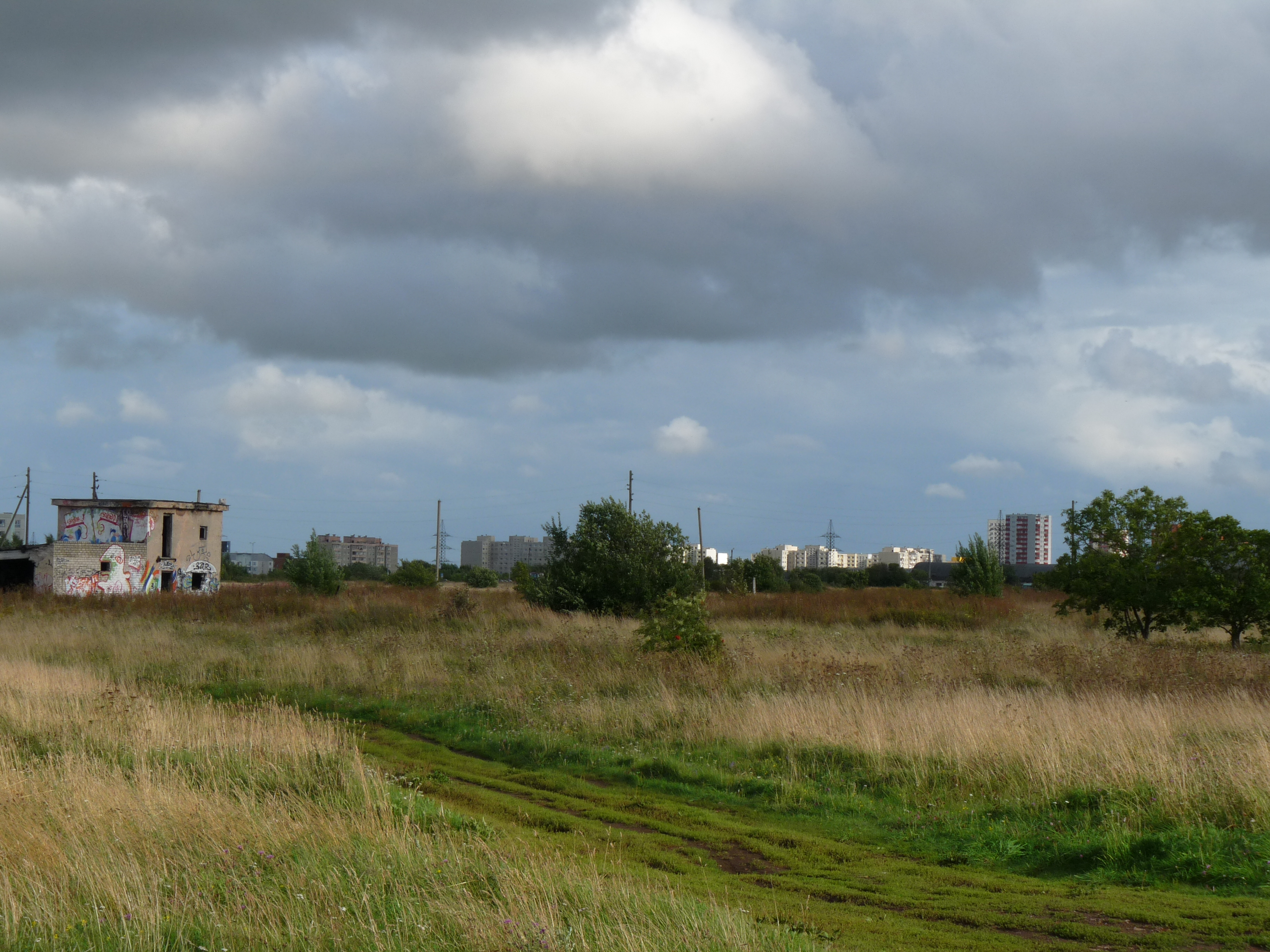

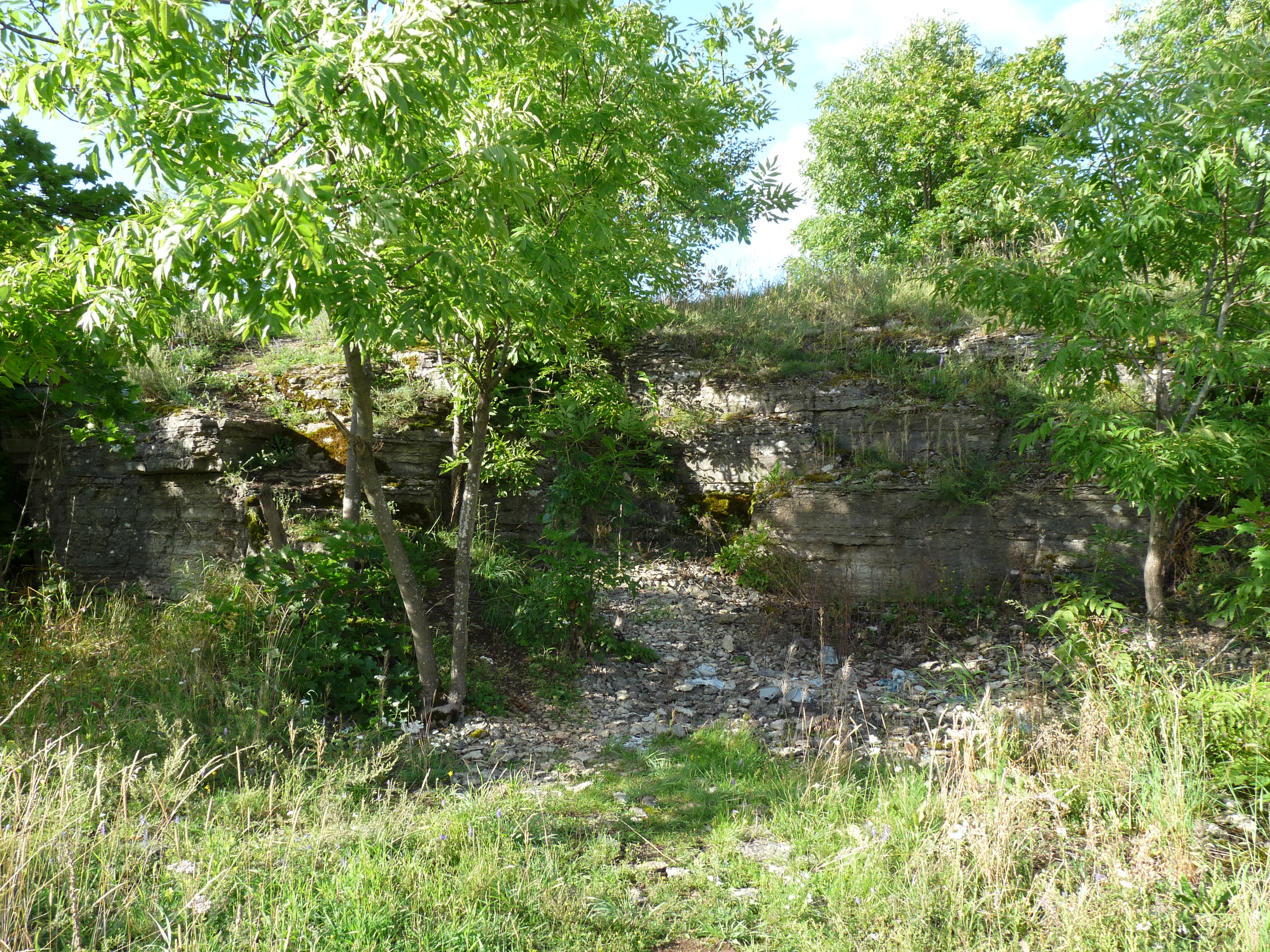

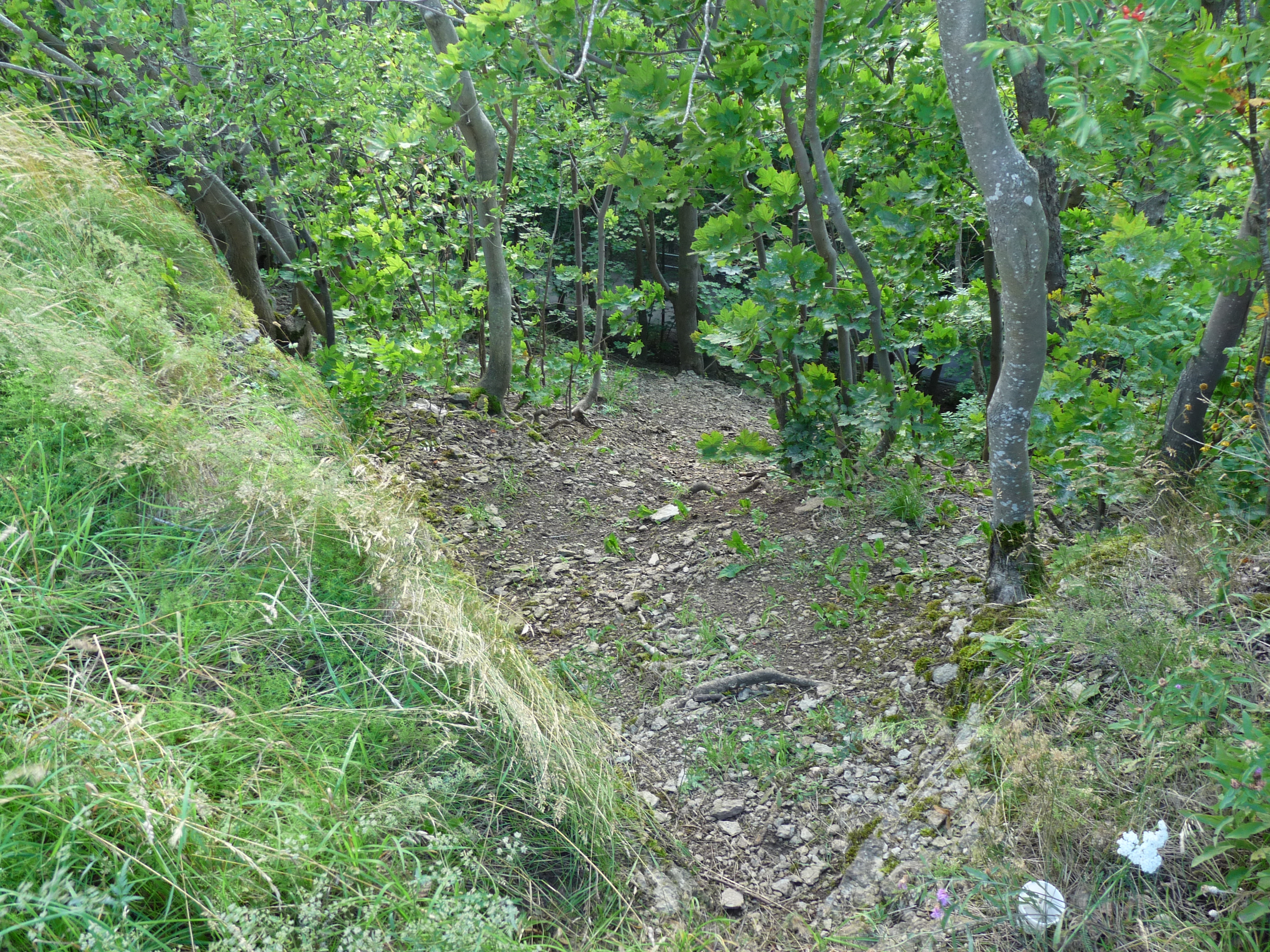
