= Pae, Tallinn =

Subdistrict of Tallinn, Estonia

Coordinates: 59.436064°N 24.820347°E

Pae
- Subdistrict of Tallinn
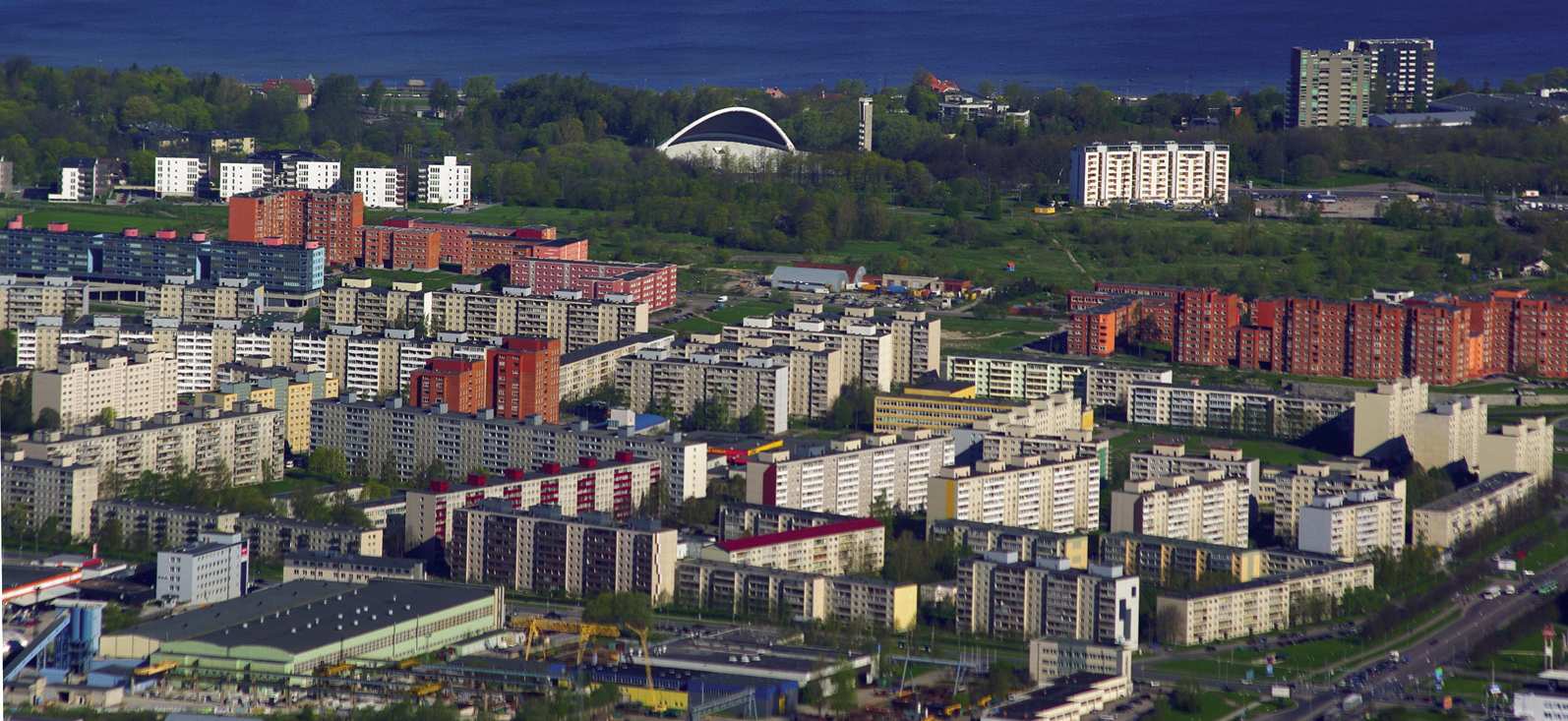
- Aerial view of Pae subdistrict.

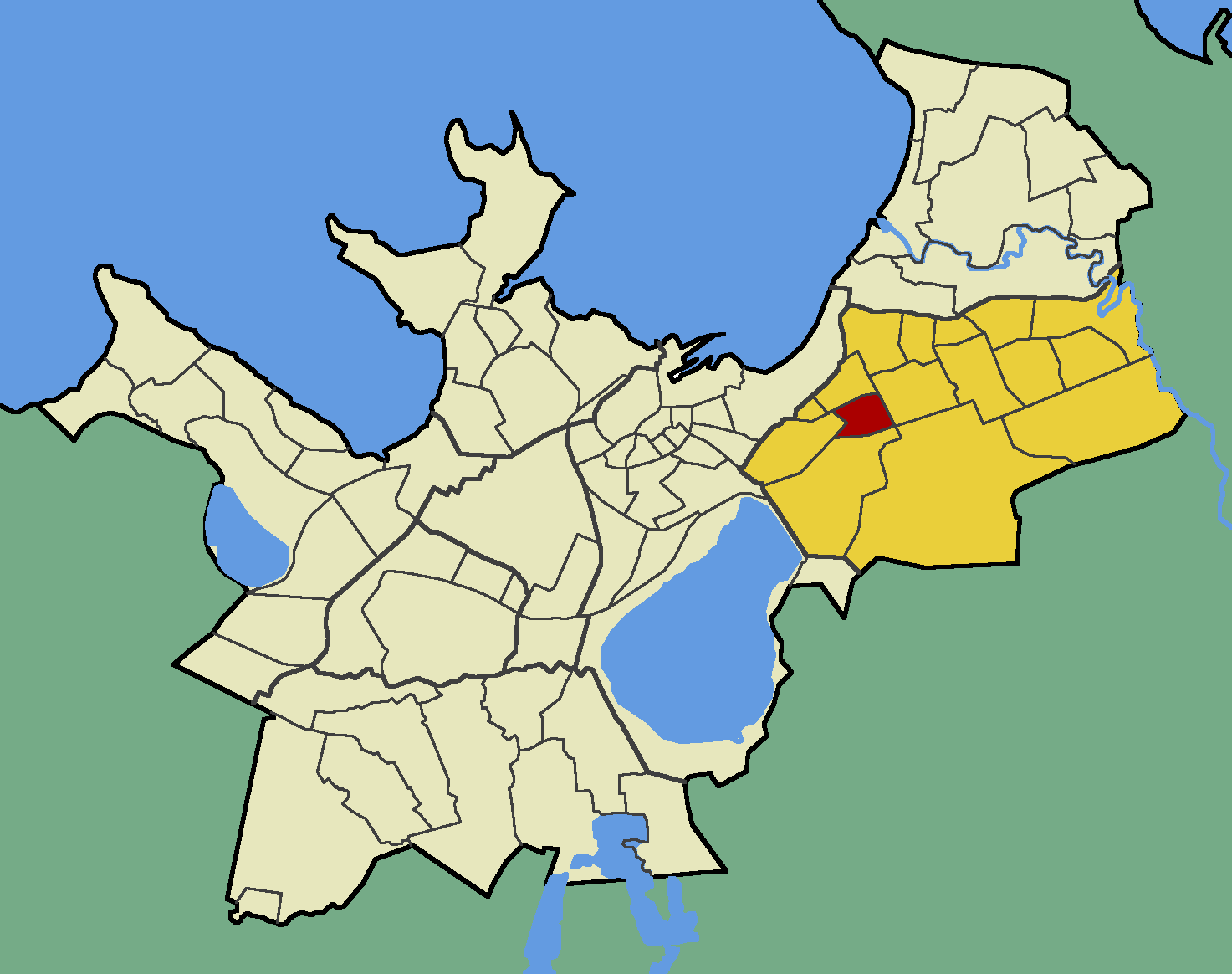
- Pae within Lasnamäe District.
- Country: Estonia
- County: Harju County
- City: Tallinn
- District: Lasnamäe

Population (01.01.2014)
  - Total: 13,918

Pae (Estonian for "Limestone") is a subdistrict (Estonian: asum) in the district of Lasnamäe, Tallinn, the capital of Estonia. It has a population of 13,918 (As of 1 January 2014).

== Gallery ==
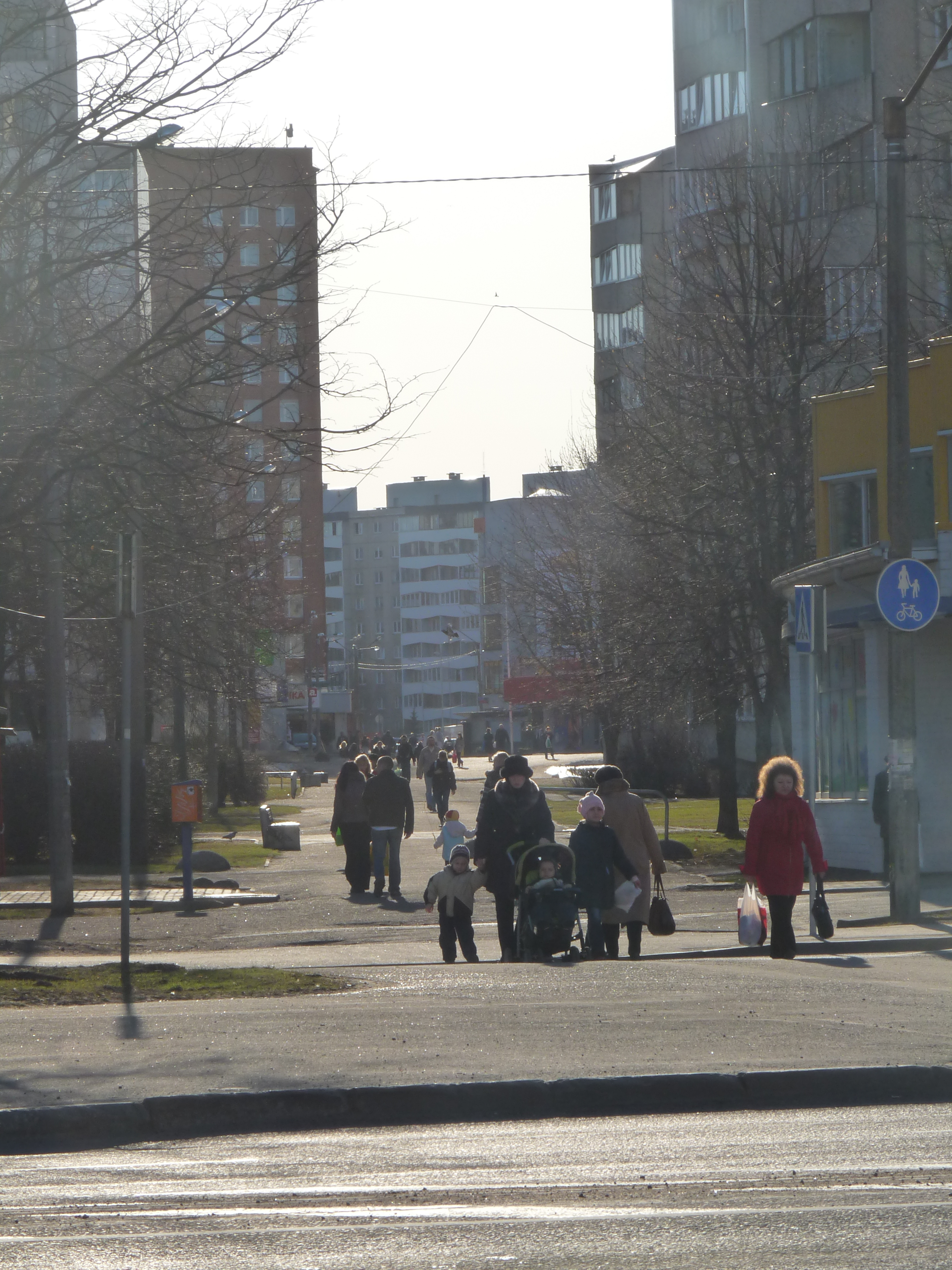

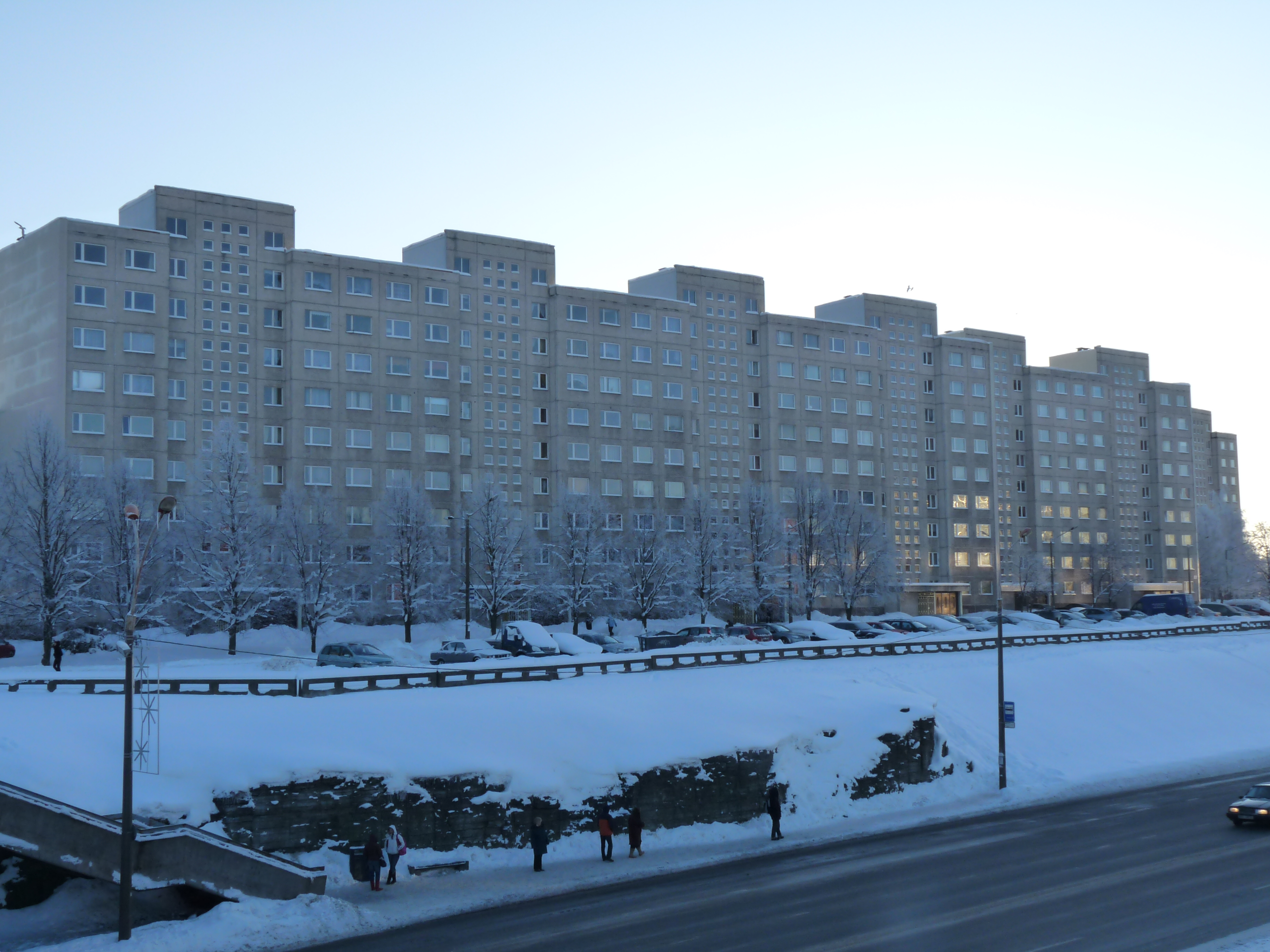

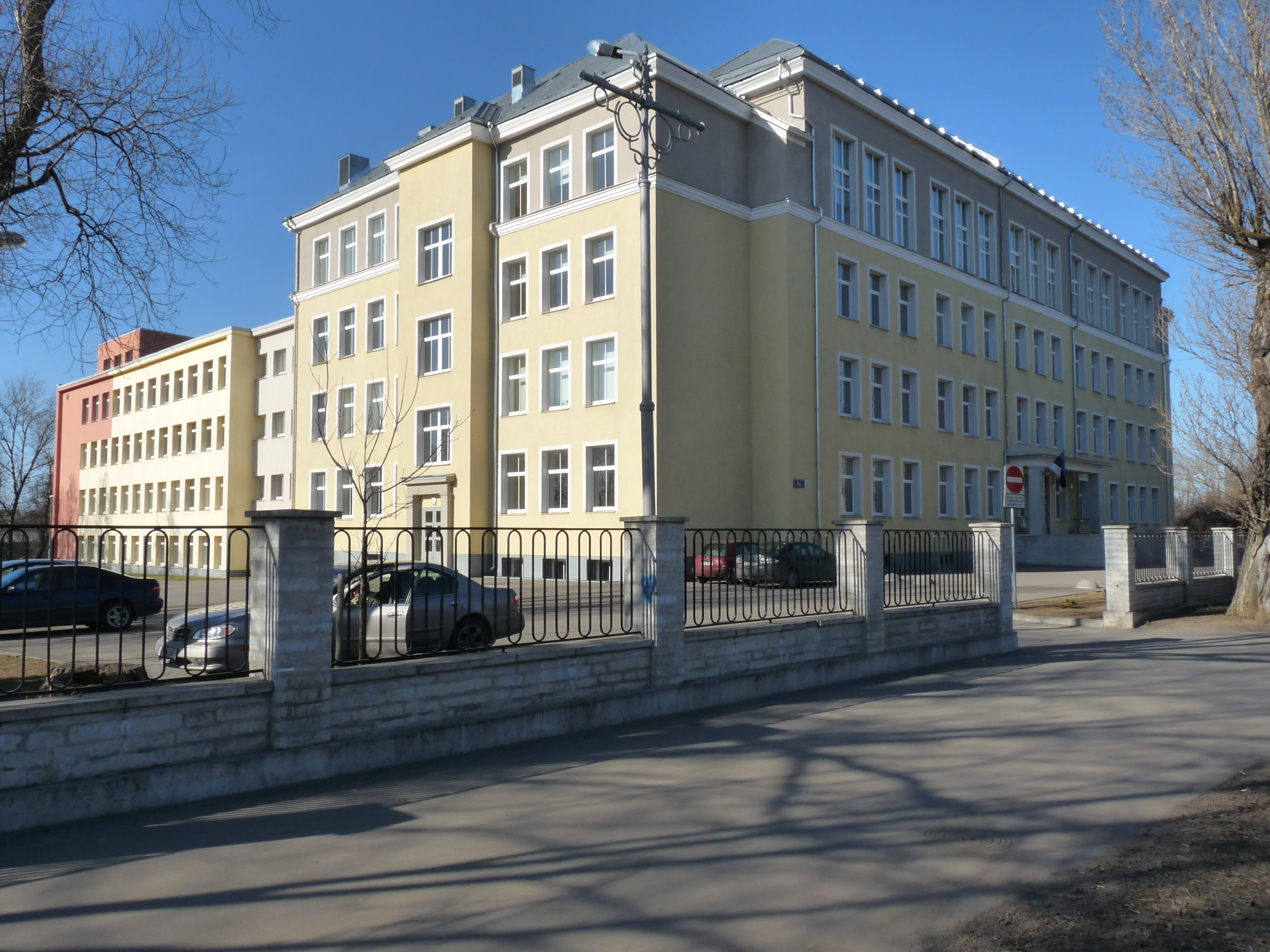
Pae Gymnasium

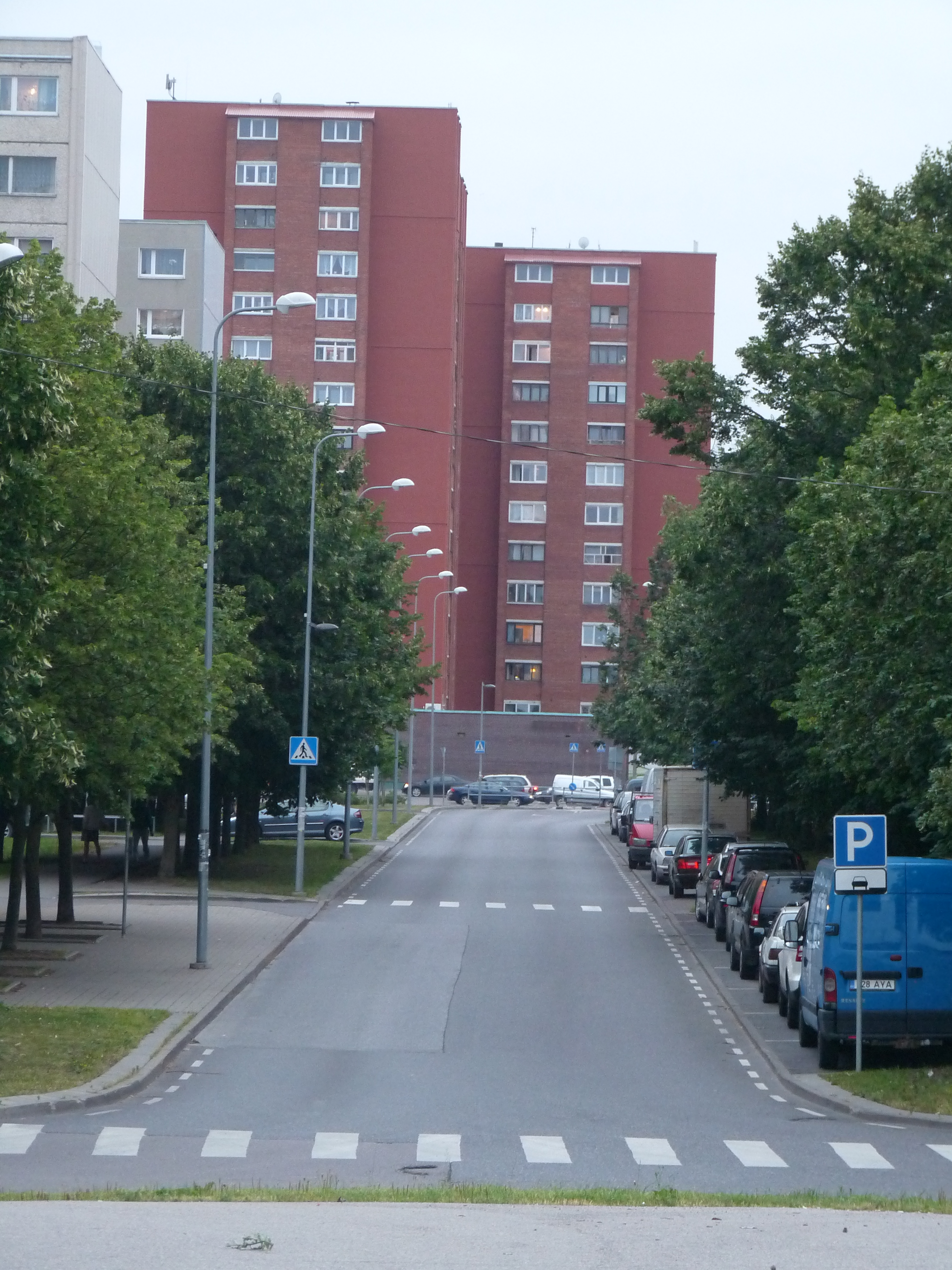
