= Pae, Rapla County =

Village in Estonia

Coordinates: 59°00′N 24°53′E

Pae
- Village
- Interactive map of Pae
- Country: Estonia
- County: Rapla County
- Parish: Kehtna Parish
- Time zone: UTC+2 (EET)
  - Summer (DST): UTC+3 (EEST)

Pae (German: Payel) is a village in Kehtna Parish, Rapla County in northern-central Estonia.
