= Alyssa =

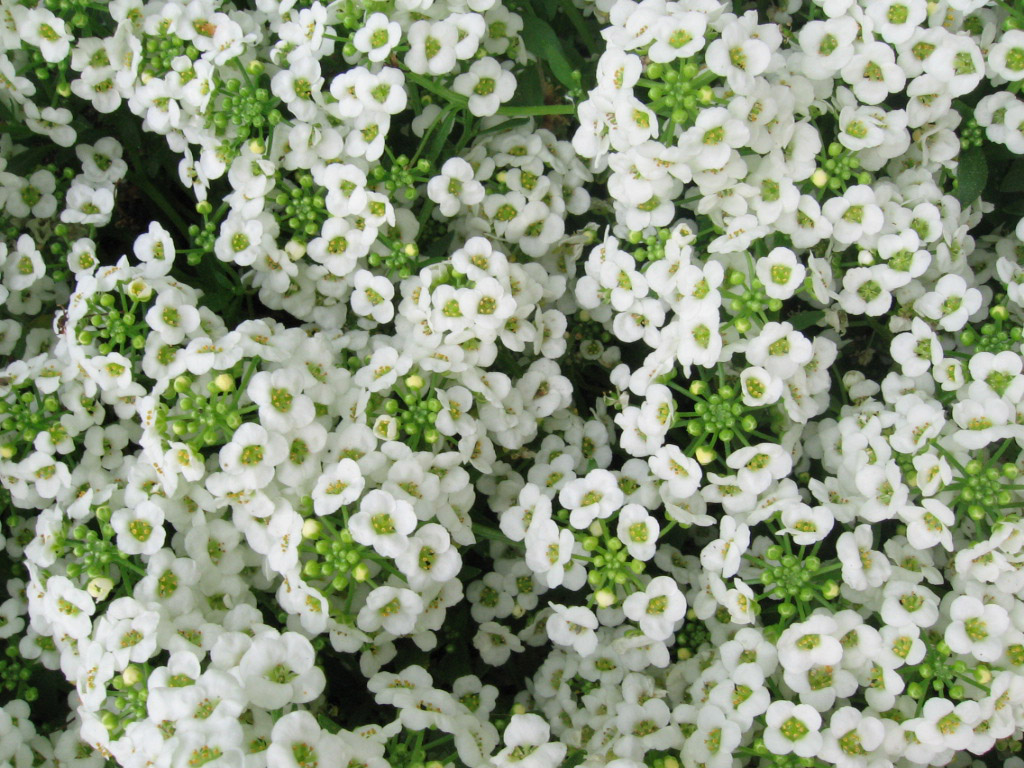
- Alyssa may be derived from the name of the flower alyssum
- Gender: feminine

Origin
- Origin: Greek
- Meaning: Without rage/rabies

Other names
- Alternative spelling: Alysa, Alisa, Elissa, Alissa, Aylissa

Alyssa is a feminine given name with multiple origins. Alysa is an alternative spelling.

As used in Western countries, the name is usually derived from the name of the flower alyssum. The name of the flower derives from the Greek ἀ- a- ("not") and λύσσα lyssa ("mania, rabies"); the flower was formerly thought to cure skin diseases. It shares many variants in common with the name Alice and is occasionally considered a form of that name as well.

Other equivalents of Alice include Alisa and Alissa. Elissa (Arabic: اليسار / ALA-LC: Alīssār; اليسا / Alīssā; عليسا ‘Alīssā; عليسة / ‘Alīssah) are variations of the name of Queen Elissa, the founder of Carthage, used in Middle Eastern countries.

The name has been popular in the United States, where it ranked among the top 20 names between 2000 and 2009. The name's popularity declined steadily throughout the next decade, and by 2020 its rank had fallen to 199.

== Notable people named Alyssa ==
- Alyssa A. Goodman (born 1962), American astronomer, scientist, and college professor
- Alyssa Adams, American editor and graphic designer
- Alyssa Alano (born 1987), Filipino-Australian film and television actress and host
- Alyssa Alhadeff (2003–2018), one of the 17 victims who was killed in the Stoneman Douglas High School shooting
- Alyssa Anderson (born 1990), American competition swimmer
- Alyssa Ashley Nichols (born 1984), birth name of American actress Indigo
- Alyssa Ayres, American college dean
- Alyssa Baldin (born 1990), Canadian elite ice hockey player
- Alyssa Bannan (born 2002), Australian rules footballer
- Alyssa Barlow, former member of American Christian rock and CCM band BarlowGirl
- Alyssa Baumann (born 1998), American gymnast
- Alyssa Beckerman (born 1981), American gymnast
- Alyssa Boey (born 1996), Malaysian tennis player
- Alyssa Bonagura (born 1988), American singer-songwriter
- Alyssa Brown (born 1989), Canadian artistic gymnast
- Alyssa Brugman (born 1974), Australian writer and novelist
- Alyssa Budhoo (born 1991), Canadian-Guyanese footballer
- Alyssa Bull (born 1995), Australian canoeist
- Alyssa Bustamante (born 1994), American murderer
- Alyssa Campanella (born 1990), American beauty queen
- Alyssa Carson (born 2001), American space enthusiast
- Alyssa Cecere (born 1987), Canadian professional ice hockey player
- Alyssa Chia (born 1974), Taiwanese actress and television host
- Alyssa Cole (born 1982), American author
- Alyssa Conley (born 1991), South African athlete
- Alissa Crans, American mathematician
- Alyssa Cruz Aguero, Guamanian beauty pageant contestant
- Alyssa Diaz (born 1985), American actress
- Alyssa Edwards (born 1980), American drag queen
- Alyssa Farah Griffin (born 1989), American political advisor
- Alyssa Fleming (born 1994), American lacrosse player
- Alyssa Gagliardi (born 1992), American ice hockey player
- Alyssa Gialamas (born 1995), American Paralympic swimmer
- Alyssa Giannetti (born 1994), American professional footballer
- Alyssa Grace (born 2007), American singer-songwriter
- Alyssa Graham, American singer-songwriter
- Alyssa Hayden (born 1970), Australian politician
- Alyssa Healy (born 1990), Australian women's cricketer
- Alyssa Howard, pseudonym of American writing partners Eileen Buckholtz, Ruth Glick, Carolyn Males, and Louise Titchener
- Alyssa Jacey (born 1981), American singer-songwriter and former dancer
- Alyssa Kleiner (born 1993), American soccer player
- Alyssa Lagonia (born 1989), Canadian professional soccer player
- Alyssa Lampe (born 1988), American freestyle wrestler
- Alyssa LaRoche (born 1979), American entrepreneur, machinimaker, fashion designer, journalist, scenographer, and author
- Alyssa Leonard, American lacrosse player
- Alyssa Lim (born 1991), English badminton player
- Alyssa Manley (born 1994), American field hockey player
- Alyssa Mastromonaco (born 1976), American spokeswoman and former government official
- Alyssa Mautz (born 1989), American professional soccer player
- Alyssa Mayo (born 2000), American tennis player
- Alyssa McClelland (born 1981), Australian director, writer, and actress
- Alyssa Mendonsa (born 1990/1991), Indian playback singer
- Alyssa Micaela (born 1992), American country singer-songwriter
- Alyssa Mifsud (born 1994), Australian rules footballer
- Alyssa Milano (born 1972), American actress, producer, singer, author, and activist
- Alyssa Miller (born 1989), American model
- Alyssa Monks (born 1977), American painter
- Alyssa Murray (born 1992), American professional lacrosse player
- Alyssa Naeher (born 1988), American soccer player
- Alyssa Nakken (born 1990), American professional baseball coach
- Alyssa Nicole Pallett (born 1985), Canadian model, actress, and businesswoman
- Alyssa Oviedo (born 2000), American-born Dominican footballer
- Alyssa Parker (born 1994), American field hockey player
- Alyssa Peterson (1976–2003), American Army soldier
- Alyssa Ramsey (born 1982), American soccer player
- Alyssa Reid (born 1993), Canadian singer-songwriter
- Alyssa Rosenzweig, Canadian software engineer
- Alyssa Saufika, member of musical group Blink Indonesia
- Alyssa Soebandono (born 1991), Indonesian actress, presenter, and singer
- Alyssa Stephens (born 1998), birth name of American rapper Latto
- Alyssa Sutherland (born 1982), Australian actress
- Alyssa Thompson (born 2004), American professional soccer player
- Alyssa Thomas (born 1992), American professional basketball player
- Alyssa Tirtosentono (born 2000), Dutch badminton player
- Alyssa Underwood, Australian cricketer
- Alyssa Ustby (born 2002), American basketball player
- Alyssa Valdez (born 1993), Filipino volleyball player
- Alyssa Wohlfeiler (born 1989), American ice hockey player
- Alyssa Wong, American writer

== Notable people named Alysa ==
- Alysa King, Canadian actress
- Alysa Liu (born 2005), American figure skater
- Alysa Nahmias, American director, producer, and writer
- Alysa Stanton (born circa 1964), African-American rabbi

== Fictional characters ==
- Alyssa, a character in the 2022 American-Canadian holiday film Christmas in Rockwell
- Alyssa Jones, from the View Askewniverse and the 1997 film Chasing Amy
- Alyssa Moy, from Fantastic Four comics
