= Elissa (given name) =

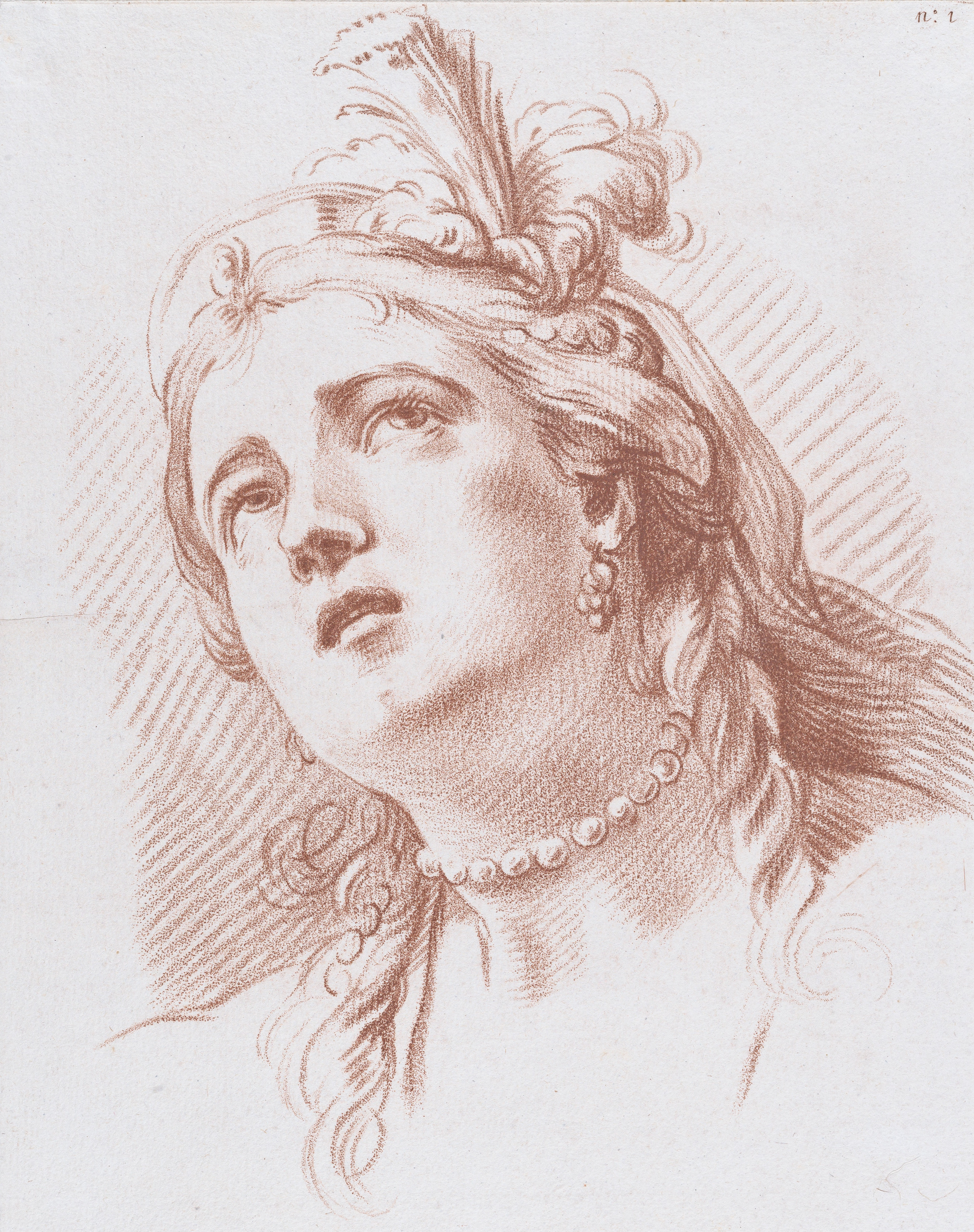
- Queen Dido, who is also known as Elissa. Drawing by Charles-Joseph Natoire, mid to late 18th century.
- Pronunciation: /əˈlɪsə/
- Gender: Female
- Language: Ancient Greek; Hebrew

Origin
- Meaning: Variations of the name of Queen Elissa, the founder of Carthage. Also can be from Hebrew name Elisheba meaning "Oath to God".
- Region of origin: English

Other names
- Related names: Alyssa, Elisa, Elizabeth, Ellie

Elissa is a feminine given name. It is the root of Elizabeth. Its popularity also derives from its use as an alternate name for the legendary Queen Dido.

Closely related names include Alyssa, Elisa, and Eliza. Alternate spellings include Ellissa and Elyssa.

== People ==
- Dido, first Queen of Carthage, in some sources is referred to as Elissa
- Elissa (singer) (born 1971), birth name Elissar Khoury, Lebanese singer known by the mononym Elissa
- Elissa Aalto (1922–1994), Finnish architect and author
- Elissa Alarie (born 1986), Canadian rugby player
- Elissa P. Benedek (born 1936), American clinical psychiatrist and professor
- Elissa Blount Moorhead, American artist and writer
- Elissa Cameron, New Zealand wildlife biologist
- Elissa Cunane (born 2000), American basketball player
- Elissa Down, Australian filmmaker
- Ellie Downie (born 1999), British gymnast, born Elissa Downie
- Elissa Minet Fuchs (1919–2023), American ballerina
- Elissa Hallem, American neurobiologist
- Elissa Landi (1904–1948), Italian actress
- Elissa Lansdell, Canadian television host
- Elissa Murphy, American software engineer and executive
- Elissa Mielke, Canadian singer and model
- Elissa L. Newport, American psycholinguist and professor
- Elissa Schappell, American writer
- Elissa Shevinsky, American executive and writer
- Elissa Silverman (born c. 1973), American politician
- Elissa Slotkin (born 1976), American senator
- Elissa Steamer (born 1975), American professional skateboarder
- Elissa Wall (born 1986), American writer
- Elissa Washuta, Native American writer

== See also ==
- Alyssa
- Elisa (given name)
- Elisha
- Eliza (given name)
