= List of DC Super Hero Girls (TV series) episodes =

DC Super Hero Girls is an American animated television series based on the DC Comics superhero web series of the same name.

== Series overview ==
Season	Episodes	Originally released	
Season	Episodes	First released	Last released
Theatrical short		July 27, 2018	
Shorts	52	January 17, 2019	March 19, 2020
1	52	March 8, 2019	December 27, 2020
2	26	June 6, 2021	October 24, 2021
Crossovers	3	December 19, 2020	May 28, 2022
DC FanDome shorts	2	September 12, 2020	

== Episodes ==
The title of every episode and short is styled as a social media hashtag.

=== Theatrical short (2018) ===
Title	Directed by	Written by	Storyboard by	Original release date
"#TheLateBatsby"	Lauren Faust and Jennifer Kluska	Story by : Lauren Faust; Screenplay by : Lauren Faust and M. A. Larson	Paul Rudish, John Sanford, and Bruce Smith	July 27, 2018 (theatrical); January 10, 2019 (online)
Batgirl is annoyed when her friends, Wonder Woman, Supergirl, Zatanna, Green Lantern (Jessica Cruz), and Bumblebee, face the villain Mr. Freeze without her. She, however, has to wait for her father, Commissioner Jim Gordon, to fall asleep so she can sneak out of the house and join the fight.: Note: This short was included with the theatrical release of Teen Titans Go! To the Movies before being released online, and follows the same premise as the Super Best Friends Forever animated short "Time Waits for No Girl", which was part of the DC Nation Shorts block on Cartoon Network in 2012.

=== Super Shorts (2019–20) ===
No. overall	No. in season	Title	Directed by	Written by	Storyboard by	Original release date
1	1	"#SuperSleeper"	Steve Stefanelli	Story by : John K. Lei	John K. Lei	January 17, 2019 (online)
After discovering that Supergirl flies in her sleep, Batgirl runs herself ragged chasing her across the city to keep her out of trouble.
2	2	"#BatCatcher"	Steve Stefanelli	Story by : Craig Young	José Pou	January 24, 2019 (online)
Batgirl sees what she thinks is the Bat-Signal and gets ready to prove her worth as a sidekick to Batman. When it turns out to be the shadow of an actual bat in her room, though, she flies into a terrified panic trying to chase it out.
3	3	"#HamsterConQueso"	Steve Stefanelli	Story by : Ryan Hanson	Rachel Peters	January 31, 2019 (online)
Tasked with looking after the school's hamster mascot for the weekend, Batgirl has her hands full trying to stop it from ruining a health inspection at the Burrito Bucket restaurant where she works.
4	4	"#HashtagFrownyFace"	Steve Stefanelli	Story by : John K. Lei	John K. Lei	February 7, 2019 (online)
Batgirl's overuse of emojis while texting leaves Wonder Woman, Bumblebee, and Green Lantern (Jessica Cruz) in a misunderstanding when she tries to call for their help in battling Poison Ivy.
5	5	"#StreetStyle"	Steve Stefanelli	Story by : Jennilee Murray	Agnes Salek	February 14, 2019 (online)
Supergirl puts on a new dress for picture day at school, only to shred it piece by piece as she deals with a string of emergencies on her way to class.
6	6	"#BatAndSwitch"	Steve Stefanelli	Story by : José Pou	Agnes Salek	February 21, 2019 (online)
Zatanna's spell to help Batgirl and Commissioner Gordon better understand each other backfires, causing Batgirl to switch bodies with people all over Metropolis.
7	7	"#PlightOfTheBumblebee"	Steve Stefanelli	Story by : Jennilee Murray	Agnes Salek	February 28, 2019 (online)
A malfunction in Bumblebee's suit leaves her scrambling to get to class on time so she can keep up her perfect attendance record.
8	8	"#FaultyPowers"	Steve Stefanelli	Story by : Lucas Armstrong	Ian Cherry	March 7, 2019 (online)
A string of gadget design failures pushes Batgirl to the brink of giving up crime-fighting.
9	9	"#PackBat"	Steve Stefanelli	Story by : Spencer Moreland	Ian Cherry	March 14, 2019 (online)
Jessica and Wonder Woman try to persuade Batgirl to clean up the hideout before her collection of gadgets and junk completely fills it.
10	10	"#Buzzkill"	Steve Stefanelli	Story by : Lucas Armstrong	Ian Cherry	March 21, 2019 (online)
As hall monitor, Bumblebee goes head-to-head with the cocky Green Lantern (Hal Jordan) to get him to obey the rules.
11	11	"#GoFish"	Steve Stefanelli	Story by : Lucas Armstrong	Ian Cherry	March 28, 2019 (online)
Aqualad buys a pet goldfish to give to Bumblebee for her birthday, but one mishap after another sends him scrambling across Metropolis to deliver it intact.
12	12	"#KaraCare"	Steve Stefanelli	Story by : Jamie Gallant	Ian Cherry	April 4, 2019 (online)
Weakened by overexposure to kryptonite, Supergirl relies on Wonder Woman to nurse her back to health, but soon starts to take advantage of being waited on hand and foot.
13	13	"#SpeedyDelivery"	Steve Stefanelli	Story by : Lucas Armstrong	Agnes Salek	April 11, 2019 (online)
The Flash encounters repeated distractions while trying to deliver a cake to a party across town within 10 minutes.
14	14	"#TacoTuesday"	Steve Stefanelli	Story by : Lucas Armstrong	John K. Lei	April 18, 2019 (online)
After Bumblebee gets the last taco at lunch, Giganta chases her all over the school to take it for herself.
15	15	"#SilverScream"	Steve Stefanelli	Story by : Craig Young	Agnes Salek	April 25, 2019 (online)
Rude and annoying theater audience members drive Supergirl crazy as she tries to watch a horror film.
16	16	"#PrizeFighter"	Steve Stefanelli	Story by : Craig Young	Agnes Salek	May 2, 2019 (online)
At the amusement park arcade, Supergirl finds a basketball game much more challenging than she expected, while Batgirl wins prize after prize at the whack-a-mole game and Wonder Woman becomes obsessed with a fortune-telling machine.
17	17	"#HardRock"	Steve Stefanelli	Story by : Craig Young	Rachel Peters	May 9, 2019 (online)
While attending a rock concert with Supergirl, Wonder Woman mistakes a mosh pit for a mass demonic possession and gets carried away trying to knock some sense into the crowd.
18	18	"#PictureDaze"	Steve Stefanelli	Story by : Jennilee Murray	John K. Lei	May 16, 2019 (online)
Star Sapphire becomes convinced that Jessica Cruz is trying to steal Hal Jordan's affections and starts a brawl with her during school picture day, with Hal caught in the middle.
19	19	"#LetThemEatPie"	Steve Stefanelli	Story by : Lucas Armstrong	Agnes Salek	May 23, 2019 (online)
As Wonder Woman faces Giganta and the Flash in a pie-eating contest, the taste of pumpkin pie wakes up her drive to win.
20	20	"#WasabiWar"	Steve Stefanelli	Story by : Mathieu Hains	John K. Lei	May 30, 2019 (online)
Zatanna gets a dinner reservation for herself and Supergirl at an exclusive sushi restaurant, but the meal falls victim to Supergirl's dislike of Japanese cuisine and a miscast spell that turns the food into a city-wrecking monster.
21	21	"#RemoteUncontrolled"	Steve Stefanelli	Story by : Jennilee Murray	John Lei	June 6, 2019 (online)
An argument between Poison Ivy and Harley Quinn over what to watch on television turns into a brawl that destroys their living room.
22	22	"#TheSlowAndTheFurious"	Steve Stefanelli	Story by : Lucas Armstrong	Ian Cherry	June 13, 2019 (online)
Jessica gets to use her mother's van for the week, but struggles to keep it and her nerves intact while driving her friends around town.
23	23	"#BigScreenBully"	Steve Stefanelli	Story by : Lucas Armstrong	Ian Cherry	June 20, 2019 (online)
Bumblebee suits up to even the score against Giganta after having her night at the movies ruined.
24	24	"#EqualTights"	Steve Stefanelli	Story by : Ryan Hanson	Ian Cherry	June 27, 2019 (online)
Hal Jordan's attempts to impress Superman with his heroics do more harm than good, prompting Superman to think up a scheme to get him out of the way.
25	25	"#DyeHarder"	Steve Stefanelli	Story by : Craig Young	John K. Lei	July 4, 2019 (online)
Zatanna's favorite stylist faces the biggest challenge of her career when she has to work on Supergirl's incredibly tough hair.
26	26	"#LostAndFound"	Steve Stefanelli	Story by : Ryan Hansen	Agnes Salek	July 11, 2019 (online)
When Wonder Woman misplaces her Lasso of Truth, Harley Quinn finds it and causes mayhem all over the city by forcing people to reveal their most embarrassing secrets.
27	27	"#StainedFighter"	Steve Stefanelli	Story by : Craig Young	Steve Stefanelli	July 18, 2019 (online)
A monster attacks while Supergirl is washing her costume, forcing her to improvise so she can keep her civilian identity a secret.
28	28	"#CruzControl"	Steve Stefanelli	Story by : Jennilee Murray	John K. Lei	July 25, 2019 (online)
On her way to school for picture day, Jessica is repeatedly distracted by people who fail to dispose of their trash and recyclables properly.
29	29	"#BabsGirl"	Steve Stefanelli	Story by : Jamie Gallant	Naz Naqvi	August 1, 2019 (online)
Finding herself without her suit or gadgets, Batgirl improvises to stop a pair of graffiti-painting vandals.
30	30	"#AdBlockers"	Steve Stefanelli	Story by : Ryan Hanson	Agnes Salek	August 8, 2019 (online)
Zatanna and Green Arrow get so caught up in sabotaging the advertisements for each other's shows that they forget to put on the actual performances.
31	31	"#ArtificialIntelligence"	Steve Stefanelli	Story by : Craig Young	Agnes Salek	August 15, 2019 (online)
After accidentally injecting herself with a serum that boosts her intelligence instead of her strength, Giganta devises an intricate plot to take down all of the Super Hero Girls at once.
32	32	"#AsteroidBelter"	Steve Stefanelli	Story by : Ryan Hanson	Ian Cherry	August 22, 2019 (online)
Hal Jordan's obsession with making the perfect hot dog drives Jessica crazy as the two race to stop an asteroid from destroying Metropolis.
33	33	"#CandyCrushed"	Steve Stefanelli	Story by : Craig Young	Rachel Peters	August 29, 2019 (online)
Giganta and Livewire fight over the last candy bar in the school cafeteria's vending machine, only for Catwoman to steal it from both of them.
34	34	"#VanityInsanity"	Steve Stefanelli	Story by : Jennilee Murray	Ian Cherry	September 5, 2019 (online)
Zatanna's determination to look perfect for school picture day causes havoc for all the students.
35	35	"#PhotoOops"	Steve Stefanelli	Story by : Ian Cherry	Ian Cherry	September 12, 2019 (online)
Jimmy Olsen tries to get heroic action photos of the girls for the school newspaper, but fails time after time.
36	36	"#Vegecide"	Steve Stefanelli	Story by : Spencer Moreland	Rachel Peters	September 19, 2019 (online)
When Poison Ivy unleashes her wrath against a vegan restaurant, Jessica Cruz has to suit up and fight off the crazed plants and vegetables.
37	37	"#StressTest"	Steve Stefanelli	Story by : José Pou	John K. Lei	September 26, 2019 (online)
Batgirl has to figure out a way to sneak out of her history test so she can join the other girls' fight against a supervillain.
38	38	"#Booked"	Steve Stefanelli	Story by : Lucas Armstrong	John K. Lei	October 3, 2019 (online)
Supergirl is desperate to go to a concert, but she runs into one aggravation after another as she serves detention by re-shelving books in the school library.
39	39	"#ComicGone"	Steve Stefanelli	Story by : Craig Young	Agnes Salek	October 17, 2019 (online); October 5, 2019 (Cartoon Network UK)
Following a disagreement between their civilian selves over which of them should have a rare comic book, Batgirl and Harley Quinn get into an after-hours brawl to claim it.
40	40	"#SoulTaken"	Steve Stefanelli	Story by : José Pou	José Pou	October 31, 2019 (online)
Katana's nightly crime-fighting takes a strange turn when Harley Quinn steals her sword and runs wild with it through the Metropolis Pier amusement park.
41	41	"#ToughCrowd"	Steve Stefanelli	Story by : Lucas Armstrong	Agnes Salek	November 14, 2019 (online); September 28, 2019 (Cartoon Network UK)
Zatanna struggles to hold her audience's attention as she puts on a magic show in the park.
42	42	"#BoothBoot"	Steve Stefanelli	Story by : Lucas Armstrong	Ian Cherry	November 28, 2019 (online); September 7, 2019 (Cartoon Network UK)
Before Batgirl can retrieve her newest invention from the girls' hideout and go after Harley Quinn, she has to deal with three elderly women sitting in the booth at Sweet Justice that hides the secret entrance.
43	43	"#SofaSoGood"	Steve Stefanelli	Story by : Ian Cherry	Ian Cherry	December 3, 2019 (online); November 16, 2019 (Cartoon Network UK)
Batgirl and Bumblebee run into one problem after another while trying to carry a discarded sofa across town and into the hideout.
44	44	"#TheBeeStandsAlone"	Steve Stefanelli	Story by : Agnes Salek	Agnes Salek	December 3, 2019 (online); September 21, 2019 (Cartoon Network UK)
After Bumblebee's teammates are knocked out in a dodgeball game during gym class, she has to face a team of Metropolis High's worst bullies on her own.
45	45	"#VeggieBurritoBucket"	Steve Stefanelli	Story by : Steve Stefanelli	Agnes Salek	December 3, 2019 (online); November 2, 2019 (Cartoon Network UK)
Jessica finds herself caught between her loyalty to a friend and her own distaste for meat while covering a shift at the Burrito Bucket for an ailing Batgirl.
46	46	"#SuckerPunch"	Steve Stefanelli	Story by : Craig Young	John K. Lei	January 9, 2020 (online); November 2, 2019 (Cartoon Network UK)
Batgirl resorts to extreme measures, including a little help from Supergirl, to win a plush bat toy in a punching game at the Metropolis Pier.
47	47	"#PurseScratcher"	Steve Stefanelli	Story by : Steve Stefanelli	John K. Lei	January 24, 2020 (online); January 12, 2020 (Cartoon Network UK)
Catwoman's attempt to steal an expensive handbag turns into a wild fight when the Cheetah tries to take it for herself.
48	48	"#StarStruck"	Steve Stefanelli	Story by : José Pou	John K. Lei	February 6, 2020 (online); October 12, 2019 (Cartoon Network UK)
Star Sapphire returns to Metropolis High for revenge against Hal Jordan during the homecoming football game, with Lois Lane and Jimmy Olsen caught in the crossfire.: Note: This short is a follow-up to the episode "#HateTriangle".
49	49	"#FlashForwardFlashback"	Steve Stefanelli	Story by : Josh Stafford	Ian Cherry	February 20, 2020 (online); December 14, 2019 (Cartoon Network UK)
The Flash races back and forth across Metropolis to deal with one emergency after another while trying to get to class on time.
50	50	"#ShellShock"	Steve Stefanelli	Story by : Agnes Salek	Agnes Salek	March 5, 2020 (online); October 19, 2019 (Cartoon Network UK)
A school assignment to protect an egg overnight sends Supergirl on a mad dash across Metropolis and pits her against a flock of angry chickens.
51	51	"#TheCommute"	Steve Stefanelli	Story by : Jamie Gallant	Ian Cherry	March 19, 2020 (online); January 12, 2020 (Cartoon Network UK)
Batgirl is eager to respond to a fire at the Metropolis Pier, but a flat tire on her moped forces her to take the bus instead.
52	52	"#AbraKachoo"	Steve Stefanelli	Story by : Lucas Armstrong	Ian Cherry	October 27, 2019 (Cartoon Network UK)
When Zatanna gets a cold, her sneezing sets off uncontrollable magic bursts all over the school.: Note: This short would have been released online on April 2, 2020, but due to being unintentionally similar to the COVID-19 pandemic, it was never released online in the United States.

=== Season 1 (2019–20) ===
No. overall	No. in season	Title	Directed by	Written by	Storyboard by	Original release date	Prod. code	US viewers (millions)
1 4	1 4	"#SweetJustice"	Noëlle Raffaele and John Sanford	Lauren Faust and M. A. Larson	Régis Camargo, Jackie Cole, Erin Kavanagh, Maha Tabikh, and Natalie Wetzig	March 8, 2019 (Note: Originally aired as a television film.)	—	0.54
1 4	1 4	"#SweetJustice"	Noëlle Raffaele	Lauren Faust and M. A. Larson	Heejung Lim, Maha Tabikh, and Natalie Wetzig	March 8, 2019	—	0.54
1 4	1 4	"#SweetJustice"	Noëlle Raffaele	Lauren Faust and M. A. Larson	Kai Akira, Régis Camargo, Erin Kavanagh, and Maha Tabikh	March 8, 2019	—	0.54
1 4	1 4	"#SweetJustice"	Noëlle Raffaele and John Sanford	Lauren Faust and M. A. Larson	Régis Camargo, Jackie Cole, Heejung Lim, Doug Lovelace, Jennifer Shang, and Natalie Wetzig	March 8, 2019	—	0.54
On her first day as a student at Metropolis High School, Barbara Gordon, who used to moonlight in her hometown, Gotham City, as superheroine Batgirl, begins to suspect that some of the students possess superpowers. She starts a cafeteria-wide food fight that lands her and four other students, Karen Beecher, Jessica Cruz, Kara Danvers, and Zee Zatara, in detention. They are soon joined by a sixth girl who has been picked up by a truant officer. She reveals herself as Wonder Woman, and the others expose their abilities as they argue and fight, confirming Barbara's suspicions. Wonder Woman offers to train them as heroes; in return, Barbara shows her how to act like a typical teenager and the rest give her the civilian name "Diana Prince", and take on the hero names of Bumblebee, Green Lantern, Supergirl, and Zatanna. Squads of robots owned by Lex Luthor begin to demolish businesses all over Metropolis, and the six heroes' attempt to stop them results in the destruction of Sweet Justice, an ice cream parlor and popular teen hangout, and the end of their new friendship. Wonder Woman's overprotective mother, Queen Hippolyta, arrives to take her home to the Amazons' island of Themyscira as punishment for sneaking away, but Batgirl persuades the other four to help bring her back to Metropolis so she can fulfill her dream of protecting the world of man. The six confront Luthor's robots at the Metropolis Pier amusement park, but discover that his younger sister Lena has commandeered them in a plot to keep teenagers from having any fun. The heroes destroy Lena's command robot, ending her scheme and earning praise from the public, and renew their friendship. Three months later, Sweet Justice has been rebuilt and Barbara shows off a subterranean command center she has set up underneath it for the team's use. Dubbing themselves the "Super Hero Girls", they dedicate their efforts to keeping Metropolis safe from all evil and malice.
5	5	"#AdventuresInBunnysitting"	John Sanford	M. A. Larson	John D. Anderson	March 17, 2019	—	0.40
Zatanna leaves her two magic rabbits in Supergirl's care for the afternoon, but warns her to keep them separated at all times. When Supergirl ignores the warning and lets them out of their cages, they magically reproduce so quickly that they threaten to overrun all of Metropolis. Zatanna berates Supergirl for her carelessness, explaining that the two rabbits' love for each other allows them to reproduce when brought together. The two girls are unable to keep up with the stampede, and a hate spell cast by Zatanna only causes the rabbits to merge into a giant monster that swallows Supergirl whole. She soon breaks free with the original two rabbits and reluctantly pulls them apart, causing the others to disappear. Later, Zatanna again leaves them with Supergirl, who secretly promises to let them out.
6	6	"#HateTriangle"	John Sanford	M. A. Larson	Jackie Cole	March 24, 2019	—	0.41
Just before Metropolis High's latest football game, Hal Jordan's ex-girlfriend Carol Ferris arrives on campus as a cheerleader for the rival team. Carol is still furious at Hal for the way he broke up with her, and she manifests her powers as Star Sapphire and targets both him and Jessica, thinking mistakenly that Jessica stole him from her. Without using her own powers in aggression, Jessica shows Carol the truth, convinces her of Hal's flaws, and tells her that she needs to love herself first. Carol leaves, but vows to make Hal worthy of her love one day.
7	7	"#BurritoBucket"	John Sanford	Emily Brundige	Sabrina Alberghetti, John D. Anderson, Erin Kavanagh, and Maha Tabikh	March 31, 2019	—	0.40
Barbara enjoys her job at the Burrito Bucket restaurant, but she has been late so many times that her boss, Shane O'Shaughnessy, is ready to fire her if she makes one more mistake. When she spots a bank robbery in progress across the street, she invents one excuse after another to ask Shane for time off so she can suit up as Batgirl and stop the criminals. She, however, keeps running out of time before she can end the robbery, and even her emergency call to The Flash proves no help. Shane eventually fires Barbara for failing to complete a large order of burritos, but when the robbers target the Burrito Bucket, she creates a new superhero identity - the "Burrito Bucketeer" - and defeats them. Grudgingly, Shane re-hires her and names her "Employee of the Night".
8	8	"#MeetTheCheetah"	Noëlle Raffaele	M. A. Larson	Brianne Drouhard and Natalie Wetzig	April 7, 2019	—	0.45
Fed up with being constantly upstaged by Diana in every aspect of school life, Barbie Minerva steals a golden cat idol from her father's collection and tries to put a curse on Diana. The girls find that someone has shredded Diana's decorations for a school dance, assume their hero identities, and split up to search the school. One after another is incapacitated by an attacker with superhuman speed and agility, and Wonder Woman - the last one standing - finds it to be a cheetah-like creature, who transforms into Barbie after being knocked out. Barbie admits that she "created" the creature in question out of jealousy toward Diana, who advises her not to compare her successes to those of others. After Diana leaves, though, Barbie revels in the powers granted to her by the cat idol and vows revenge, adopting the supervillain identity of the Cheetah.
9	9	"#Beeline"	Noëlle Raffaele	Rachel Vine	Sabrina Alberghetti and Heejung Lim	May 12, 2019	—	0.36
The girls scramble to catch the last ferry home in the evening, but Karen misses it because she is too scared to jump aboard as it pulls away from the dock. As she walks home, moping over her lack of confidence, she stumbles across a plot by a team of villains which includes Star Sapphire, Catwoman, Livewire, Poison Ivy and Giganta (led by the crazed prankster Harley Quinn) to blow up the bridge across the bay. She tries to enlist the help of one friend after another, but fails for a variety of reasons and has no choice but to confront the villains alone as Bumblebee. She faces her fear and attacks Harley, destroying her detonator, and the other heroes soon arrive. Wonder Woman congratulates Bumblebee for showing real courage before the team fights the villains.
10	10	"#SuperWho?"	Noëlle Raffaele	Rachel Vine	Jennifer Shang	May 19, 2019	—	0.33
Tired of constantly seeing coverage of Superman's heroics in the Metropolis press, Supergirl tries to draw attention to her own prowess. For every feat of heroism she commits, though, Superman overshadows her with a greater one. An argument between the two degenerates into a midair fight that releases a spill of toxic waste; this in turn forms into a corrosive slime monster that begins to rampage through the streets. Superman flies in to confront it, but Bumblebee warns Supergirl that the slime will destroy the city if any of it splashes onto people or buildings. Just before Superman can land a punch, Supergirl lifts the monster into outer space and blasts it with her heat vision to destroy it safely. Superman gets the public credit for saving the day, but Supergirl's friends congratulate her for putting the city's safety ahead of her own ego.
11	11	"#ShockItToMe"	Noëlle Raffaele	Ryan Faust	Jackie Cole	May 26, 2019	—	0.26
Lois Lane turns down Leslie Willis' suggestion to add a gossip column to the school newspaper, saying that it is too mean-spirited. With the help of her electrical powers, Leslie begins to play embarrassing pranks on other students and posts the resulting videos/pictures to her social media account, gaining a large following. Instead of heeding Wonder Woman's plea to stop, she adopts the supervillain identity of Livewire and defeats each of the others in humiliating ways. Livewire challenges them to face her in front of all her followers, then blasts Wonder Woman with electricity when she is the only one not ashamed to accept the challenge. The others overcome their embarrassment and rush in to protect her, and Livewire's followers mock and desert her in light of her brutality and the sudden loss of her powers in a citywide blackout.
12	12	"#SheMightBeGiant"	Jennifer Kluska and John Sanford	Emily Brundige	Erin Kavanagh	June 2, 2019	—	0.21
Karen is a favorite target of school bullies Doris Zeul and Leslie Willis due to her small stature. To boost the effects of her weightlifting, Doris injects herself with a serum stolen from her parents' lab, which allows her to transform into the hulking and muscle-bound Giganta when she gets angry. Karen shows her friends Barbara's upgrades to her battle armor, but its new growth function fails and causes her to shrink instead. She, Batgirl, Supergirl, and Wonder Woman find Giganta tearing up the mall, where she easily holds off the other three as Karen suits up and frantically tries to fix her armor. The growth feature malfunctions again, but Bumblebee uses her tiny size to harass Giganta and trick her into knocking herself out. The next day at school, Karen shows off new confidence in standing up to Doris and Leslie.
13	13	"#FightAtTheMuseum"	Noëlle Raffaele	Patrick Rieger	Natalie Wetzig	June 9, 2019	—	0.44
Supergirl has been relying on sheer strength to defeat enemies by herself, annoying the others. Wonder Woman tries to explain the importance of strategy and teamwork, but Supergirl ignores her. When the master thief Catwoman breaks into a science museum, Supergirl learns of it first due to her enhanced hearing and goes in alone. Catwoman taunts her during a chase all over the museum, then drains her powers with a chunk of kryptonite and escapes with a collection of outer-space gems and jewelry. Remembering Wonder Woman's advice, Supergirl flicks a dropped pearl across the floor, setting off a chain reaction among the exhibits that knocks her phone into reach so she can call the others. All six heroes confront Catwoman, who drops the gems and flees, angry over her failed attempt to manipulate Supergirl.
14	14	"#CrushingIt"	Natalie Wetzig	G. M. Berrow	Jackie Cole	July 29, 2019 (Note: This episode was first released online on July 19, 2019.)	—	0.41
When Diana first arrived in Metropolis from Themyscira, she became smitten with a boy named Steve Trevor. Steve enrolls at Metropolis High School after being rejected by a military academy, and Diana's infatuation with him causes problems in her academic and extracurricular activities all week long. Over the weekend, the other girls try and fail to get her mind off Steve as he appears everywhere they are, then make a plan to get rid of him for good. Bumblebee, Green Lantern, Supergirl, and Zatanna prepare to launch a surprise attack on Steve, but Batgirl heads them off by hacking into the military academy's computer system and getting him admitted. Diana returns to her old self once he leaves Metropolis High, but tapes his picture inside her locker.
15	15	"#FromBatToWorse"	Jennifer Kluska and John Sanford	Patrick Rieger	Heejung Lim	July 29, 2019	—	0.41
Bored with life in the Metropolis suburbs, Barbara intercepts a call from Batman to her father, Commissioner Jim Gordon, about a criminal attacking a pesticide plant. Eager for excitement and determined to prove herself a worthy sidekick, she suits up as Batgirl and sneaks out of the house to face the villain, but has to keep from being spotted by her father as both make their way to the scene. The villain proves to be Poison Ivy, who intends to use an army of plants to wipe out the human population of Metropolis. Batgirl defeats her before Batman can arrive, and Gordon comments that she would make a far better sidekick for Batman than Robin, without realizing that she is actually his daughter. Poison Ivy escapes, but the Gordons settle in at home for a movie night.
16	16	"#MisgivingTree"	Juston Gordon-Montgomery and John Sanford	Emily Brundige	Erin Kavanagh, Heejung Lim, Jennifer Shang, and Maha Tabikh	July 30, 2019	—	0.39
Jessica notices a girl named Pamela Isley eating lunch by herself one day at school and decides to befriend her, over the other girls' objections. One attempt after another fails until Pamela learns of Jessica's plan to protest the removal of a 300-year-old oak tree for a construction project. The two chain themselves to the tree overnight, and Pamela bitterly tells Jessica the story of how it provided shelter for forest creatures until humans built Metropolis and drove them all away. She manifests her powers as Poison Ivy to stop the construction crew from cutting it down, while Jessica becomes Green Lantern to protect them from her plant attacks but accidentally destroys the tree. Afterward, Jessica and Pamela - neither one aware of the other's superpowered identity - find an acorn from the tree and plant it together.
17	17	"#IllusionsOfGrandeur"	Noëlle Raffaele	Cindy Morrow	Régis Camargo, Jackie Cole, and Erin Kavanagh	July 31, 2019 (Note: This episode was first released online on July 26, 2019.)	436	0.36
Tired of never receiving top billing in the magic shows put on by her father, Giovanni Zatara, Zee decides to present an act of her own on the Metropolis Pier with Karen's help, but the crowd pays more attention to a rival magician and denounces her spells as fake. Zee angrily casts a spell to sabotage his act, inadvertently turning a tattoo on his chest into a horde of gremlins that begin to cause havoc all over the pier. Karen and Zee suit up as Bumblebee and Zatanna, but have little success in stopping the gremlins until Bumblebee realizes that they just want to entertain themselves. The two girls resume their civilian identities to do a magic show for them, culminating in a disappearing trick that makes all the gremlins vanish. Even though the crowd still sees Zee as a fake, Karen reassures her that she can become a great magician someday if she continues to practice her craft. The two head home, not realizing that a couple of gremlins have stowed away in Zee's trunk.
18	18	"#BeastsInShow"	Natalie Wetzig	M. A. Larson	Jackie Cole, Erin Kavanagh, Heejung Lim, and Mariah-Rose McClaren	August 1, 2019	—	0.34
Barbara and Kara get into an argument over whose dog is better - Ace, a highly disciplined, retired police dog who is now Barbara's pet, or Kara's lovable dog Krypto, who has powers similar to hers. They decide to settle the issue by entering the Metropolis Kennel Club Dog Show, where Ace and Krypto trade victories in one event after another. Elsewhere in Metropolis, Harley Quinn's crazed spotted hyenas Lucy and Ethel escape during a walk and begin chasing a cat across the city, arriving at the dog show just as the final event begins. Ace and Krypto combine their abilities to take down the beasts and throw them out of the arena. Barbara and Kara are both sure their dogs will win Best in Show, but are outraged when the award goes to a dancing Pomeranian dog instead. Afterward, they admit their respect for each other's dogs as the animals play in the park and chase the cat through the streets.
19	19	"#GothamCon"	Juston Gordon-Montgomery and John Sanford	Tim Sheridan	Erin Kavanagh and Vaughn Tada	August 2, 2019	443	0.36
Barbara travels to Gotham City to attend the Annual Convention of Gotham City Enthusiasts with Harleen Quinzel, her best friend from her time living there. The event's special guest turns out to be Robin, who ruthlessly mocks Barbara for her admiration of Batman, and Harleen sneaks out to suit up as Harley Quinn and attack him. Barbara suits up as Batgirl and fights Harley all day long to keep Robin safe, neither girl aware of the other's civilian identity. Barbara's joy at seeing Robin still alive after apparently being crushed by a steamroller, despite his bad treatment of her, reminds Harleen that she (as Harley) has planted a bomb under his chair at the judges' table in the cosplay contest. Batgirl and Harley team up to extinguish the bomb and save Robin; afterward, as Barbara heads back to Metropolis, Harleen gives her an autographed picture of him, obtained by cornering him in an alley.
20 21	20 21	"#DCSuperHeroBoys"	Natalie Wetzig	Tim Sheridan	Jackie Cole and Diana Kidlaied	September 7, 2019	435	0.31
While investigating the appearance of strange graffiti at sites all over Metropolis, the girls run across a second group of heroes looking into the matter as well. This team, the Invinci-Bros, consists of Aqualad, the Flash, Green Arrow, Green Lantern Hal Jordan, and Hawkman; their leader is Steve Trevor, on whom Wonder Woman still has a crush. The Bros and the girls race to reach the next expected site, but find the graffiti appearing by itself and acting as a signal to open a dimensional portal. Three evil Kryptonian prisoners emerge - Ursa, Non, and General Zod, who had been locked away by Supergirl's mother just before Krypton exploded. The villains overpower both teams and threaten to crush a bus filled with passengers unless Superman surrenders himself to them. Hal sends Steve off to get donuts, snapping Wonder Woman out of her love haze and sparking her to organize an offensive. The heroes keep the villains distracted long enough to drain their powers with a chunk of kryptonite from the museum and drive Ursa and Non back through the portal. Zod resists its effects, but Supergirl breaks a fire hydrant so that Aqualad can direct its water to force him back into the portal for good. Afterward, the Bros credit Steve with saving the day, since his departure allowed Wonder Woman to think straight, to most of the girls' annoyance.
22 23	22 23	"#Frenemies"	Juston Gordon-Montgomery	Tim McKeon	Erin Kavanagh and Jennifer Shang	October 11, 2019	441	0.37
While the girls are battling Starro, Batgirl learns that Harleen Quinzel is moving to Metropolis from Gotham City. The other five find Harleen's pranks and behaviour to be insufferably annoying on their first meeting, but struggle to put up with her antics for their friend's sake. Barbara finally learns their opinions by using Diana's Lasso of Truth on them and tearfully storms away, ready to give up on their friendship. Meanwhile, Harleen befriends Selina Kyle, Pamela, Carol, Doris, and Leslie, and the five prepare for a spree of vandalism. Barbara is disappointed that Harleen wants to hang out with them instead of her; after she leaves, the six assume their villain identities (with Selina becoming Catwoman) and begin committing crimes all over Metropolis. The other five hero girls rush to stop them, but Harley Quinn's antics distract them so the villains can gain the upper hand. A talk with Barry Allen at the Sweet Justice ice cream shop makes Barbara realize that she and Harleen can have separate circles of friends and still remain on good terms with each other. She calls Harley to explain the situation, distracting her long enough for Barbara to suit up as Batgirl and join the fight. The villains flee the scene as the police arrive, and the six heroes apologize to one another and promise to stick together against these threats. Later, Barbara and Harleen notice each other's fresh injuries (sustained in the fight), but quickly dismiss their suspicions in favor of hanging out at a comic shop.
24 25	24 25	"#SoulSisters"	Noëlle Raffaele	Ben Joseph	Erin Kavanagh and Heejung Lim	October 25, 2019	444	0.41
Diana, the most skilled member of the Metropolis High School fencing club, is delighted to meet a new student who shares her proficiency. This girl is Tatsu Yamashiro, from Japan, and the two quickly bond over their enjoyment of training and exercising. The other girls are put off by Tatsu's stoic demeanor, and she and Diana privately admit to each other that they sometimes feel out of place in Metropolis. That night, the other five heroes respond to a jewelry store robbery but soon find Catwoman and several other villains lying comatose on the ground, their souls removed from their bodies. After sneaking the villains into Batgirl's bedroom, they call Diana away from her late-night fencing practice with Tatsu. All six heroes begin searching the city, but are confronted by the masked vigilante Katana, who has trapped the villains' souls within the sword she carries. She easily counters their attacks and traps the souls of all but Wonder Woman, who escapes but blames herself for leading her friends into this disaster. While researching the sword's power at the library the next day, Diana happens across Tatsu and realizes that she is Katana. The two fight within the library, then suit up outside it to continue their battle. Katana attacked the heroes because they were interfering with her mission to punish evildoers, but Wonder Woman insists that a hero's job is to protect rather than punish. Katana spots a man trying to force open a car door and strikes, taking him for a thief, but Wonder Woman throws herself in the path of the attack and loses her soul. Katana learns, to her shock and dismay, that the man had only locked himself out of his own car and had no evil intentions. She performs a ritual to release all the souls she has captured, heroes and villains alike, and Wonder Woman offers to help her find a new way to use her skills as a true hero.
26	26	"#Abracadabrapalooza"	Natalie Wetzig	Emily Brundige and M. A. Larson	Jackie Cole	November 30, 2019 (Note: This episode was first released online by Warner Bros. on November 26, 2019.)	—	0.29
While helping Zee get ready for a performance, Karen notices a pimple on her own forehead and begins to panic. To put her at ease, Zee tells her about her own childhood, traveling and performing with her father Giovanni. One morning, Zee suddenly found herself able to perform various magical feats, but could not control them and tried to keep them a secret. They were invited to perform at the Abracadabrapalooza magic festival, but Zee backed out on the night of the show, fearing that she might ruin the act. A surge of her power destroyed the dressing room, but Giovanni burst in and repaired it by casting a spell of his own. He was proud of Zee, having been worried that she might never manifest any powers; he concealed his own to spare her feelings. Giovanni gave Zee one of her grandfather's spellbooks to control her new abilities, and the two did their show together to wild applause from the Abracadabrapalooza crowd. Zee concludes her story by telling Karen to embrace change rather than hide from it.
27	27	"#RageCat"	Noëlle Raffaele	Cindy Morrow	Jennifer Shang	November 30, 2019 (Note: This episode was first released online by Warner Bros. on November 27, 2019.)	449	0.29
While volunteering at the Metropolis Animal Shelter, Jessica helps make its pet adoption event a big success. Afterward, she finds a cat named Dexter in the kennel area, but the other volunteers warn her to leave him alone because of his bad temper. She ignores them and tries repeatedly to find him a home, but all her efforts fail. During a photo shoot at a pet store, Dexter summons a Red Lantern Corps power ring and becomes the supervillain Dex-Starr, whose powers are fueled by rage over the constant attempts to domesticate him. Jessica suits up as Green Lantern to fight him; their battle destroys the store, but ends with her successfully removing Dexter's ring. She later adopts him, but his sour disposition remains.
28	28	"#TheGoodTheBadAndTheBizarre"	Noëlle Raffaele	M. A. Larson	Jackie Cole and Heejung Lim	December 16, 2019 (Note: This episode was first released online by Warner Bros. on November 28, 2019.)	453	0.16
While enjoying a wave of popularity and academic success, Supergirl is suddenly accused of committing several pranks and suspended from school for a week. These acts remind her of her time at a previous high school, when she was blamed for destroying the gym and expelled even though she insisted she had been framed. Public opinion quickly turns against her in light of a worldwide vandalism spree; while investigating in Egypt, Supergirl and Batgirl find the real perpetrator - a Bizarro counterpart of Supergirl. During a call to Clark Kent, Supergirl realizes that Bizarro must have destroyed the gym. The two face off in Metropolis, with the public blaming Supergirl for the damage Bizarro is causing. Finally fed up with taking the blame for things she has not done, Supergirl unleashes all her power against Bizarro, who retaliates in kind. Their attacks are evenly matched and leave them exhausted, and Bizarro tearfully admits that she has only been trying to be a better villain than her world's Superman and draw attention to herself. Supergirl consoles her, seeing the parallel between them, and Batgirl ensures that both of them get a front-page headline to restore their reputations.
29	29	"#BackInAFlash"	Juston-Gordon Montgomery	Nick Confalone	Wolf-Rüdiger Bloss, Alexandra Chiu, Heejung Lim, and Kexx Singleton	December 17, 2019 (Note: This episode was first released online by Warner Bros. on November 29, 2019.)	457	0.19
Barbara becomes the laughingstock of Metropolis High after she farts during a school assembly. She devises a plan to team up with Barry Allen and travel back in time, using his powers as the Flash, to switch out her breakfast burrito and thus prevent the incident from happening. The plan succeeds, and they begin using the method to undo regrettable moments from their pasts. Returning to the present, they find Metropolis to be a wasteland due to the changes they made; even though they begin undoing the alterations, the present gets worse and worse. Barbara reluctantly has Barry take her back so she can undo the final change by putting the original burrito back in her locker. The sudden arrival of future duplicates of herself from multiple alternate timelines degenerates into a brawl, but Barbara manages to pass the burrito to her past self, who eats it, thus restoring the original timeline and getting rid of all of the duplicates.
30	30	"#PowerSurge"	Natalie Wetzig	Patrick Rieger	Erin Kavanagh and Diana Kidlaied	December 18, 2019 (Note: This episode was first released online by Warner Bros. on November 30, 2019.)	458	0.25
While fighting Livewire at a power plant, Supergirl is seemingly disintegrated by a massive lightning blast. She survives and returns to the hideout, but learns that the public believes her to be dead. Seeing the chance to break away from the complaints over all the damage caused by her fights, she adopts the new identity of Power Girl, along with a less abrasive personality. She passes herself off as a counterpart of Supergirl from an alternate Earth and soon gains popularity, but her ego causes a rift with the other girls. After Livewire publishes an unflattering account of her fight with Supergirl, Power Girl angrily dismisses both it and her friends' attempts to remind her of what Supergirl stood for. During a fight at the reopened power plant, Livewire blasts Power Girl into a crater and boasts about defeating her as easily as Supergirl. Power Girl takes her friends' words to heart and resumes her Supergirl identity to knock out Livewire. The villain is arrested, and Power Girl "leaves" Earth as the workers start complaining about the newly wrecked plant all over again, to Supergirl's annoyance.
31	31	"#ScrambledEggs"	Natalie Wetzig	Tim Sheridan	Erin Kavanagh	December 19, 2019	—	0.21
In home economics class, a substitute teacher pairs the students up and assigns each pair the task of looking after an egg for the weekend. Several eggs end up broken even before the class is over, and others fall victim to assorted mishaps as the weekend progresses. Kara and Harleen Quinzel let their egg fall into a box being shipped across town; Selina Kyle quickly gets fed up with Hal Jordan and smashes theirs; Barbara takes the one she and Garth Bernstein are watching on a nightly patrol, but it gets run over by a truck; Carol Ferris foists hers off on Hal, who uses it to make breakfast; and Zee hard-boils the one assigned to her and Oliver Queen during a squabble with him. As all the students despair over their impending failure, the one intact egg belonging to Kara and Harleen falls off a delivery truck and rolls away, sparking a brawl to claim it. Pamela Isley winds up with the egg and eats it in a sandwich during Monday's class, to the others' horror. Their regular home economics teacher decides to throw out the assignment and instead puts the students in charge of caring for the Metropolis High hamster mascot's new babies.
32	32	"#DramaQueen"	Noëlle Raffaele	M. A. Larson	Wolf-Rüdiger Bloss	December 20, 2019	—	0.33
Zee cannot decide between Oliver Queen and new student Mortimer Drake for the male lead role in a school play she is directing. Oliver wins it by sabotaging Mortimer's audition, but several mishaps during rehearsals put his safety at risk. On opening night, he blames Mortimer for the accidents and admits to the audition sabotage; Zee reassigns the role to Mortimer and starts the play, with herself as the female lead. Oliver wrecks Mortimer's dressing room in anger, but finds a review of a grade-school play criticizing Mortimer's acting and praising Zee's. As Oliver realizes that Mortimer intends to harm Zee, Mortimer threatens her onstage and reveals himself as the villain Cavalier, bent on avenging himself. Oliver suits up as Green Arrow, pulls Zee to safety, and fights Cavalier in a pitched battle; the audience cheers wildly, mistaking this for the actual play. Green Arrow wins the fight, with Cavalier delivering a dramatic death scene that earns praise from both Green Arrow and the audience. The two boys come to respect one another and turn their scorn toward Zee's acting and directing as she fumes in the wings.
33 34	33 34	"#AllyCat"	Juston Gordon-Montgomery	Ben Joseph	Heejung Lim, Jennifer Shang, and Anna Lencioni	March 8, 2020 (Note: This episode was first released online on March 6, 2020.)	461	0.29
Lex Luthor excavates Stonehenge to recover an ancient book buried in a tomb underneath it. Zatanna recognizes it as the Book of Eternity, which gives its possessor the ability to see and control the future, and insists that it is too dangerous for any mortal to own. With Batgirl leaving to visit her grandmother in Gotham City, the other five girls capture Catwoman and blackmail her into helping them steal the book from Luthor. She devises a plan for them to infiltrate a party at his corporate headquarters, but it nearly fails due to a series of mishaps. When the girls reach Luthor's private vault, they discover that he is actually a supervillain and that Catwoman has betrayed them. He had already used the book to learn of the attempted heist, bribed Catwoman to join him, and captured Superman and the Invinci-Bros. The girls are quickly incapacitated and captured as well. With no superheroes to stop him, Luthor plans to rule the world after an impending meteor strike destroys civilization, a plan that horrifies Catwoman. She breaks into his headquarters and frees the girls so they can destroy the meteor, catching Luthor by surprise, and reveals that she tore a page from the book to keep him from knowing her plan. She prepares to flee with the book, but the girls force her to turn it over to them. Luthor keeps his supervillain status hidden from the public and is cleared of any wrongdoing, but finds that Catwoman has stolen everything from his vault and left Superman and the Invinci-Bros imprisoned there.
35	35	"#Retreat"	Juston Gordon-Montgomery	Ryan Faust	Diana Kidlaied	March 15, 2020	454	0.32
Jessica takes Barbara, Karen, Garth Bernstein, Hal Jordan, and Pamela Isley on a camping trip to her family's cabin in the forest. The five heroes agree not to use any of their powers for Pamela's sake. Traumatized at seeing them pick flowers and cut down trees for firewood, Pamela flees deeper into the woods and manifests her powers as Poison Ivy to raise an army of plant creatures. She sends them to attack the group, already unnerved from the ghost story Barbara has been telling; Garth is captured at the lake, and Hal is caught and turned into a zombie as the three girls barricade themselves in the cabin. They arm themselves with items from the kitchen to fight off the horde, and Jessica retrieves her Green Lantern ring and uses its power to destroy them and free Garth. The four pick up Pamela from the roadside during the drive back to Metropolis the next day, not realizing that she unleashed the attack, and suddenly remember that they have left Hal - now recovered - trapped in the cabin's closet.
36	36	"#DinnerForFive"	Juston Gordon-Montgomery	M. A. Larson	Heejung Lim	March 22, 2020	—	0.28
Hearing an intruder in the house one night, Barbara suits up as Batgirl and finds a masked, one-eyed assassin sneaking into the kitchen. The two fight across Metropolis, but he gets away. The next day at school, Barbara meets a new student named Rose Wilson, who invites her to dinner. Rose's father Slade has been absent for most of her life, but is now trying to reconnect with her. His air of cold, humorless contempt puts Barbara on edge, and she realizes that he is the man she fought the previous night. Sneaking into his bedroom, she discovers that he is the assassin Deathstroke and is targeting Commissioner Gordon. When Slade finds her snooping around, the two suit up as their super identities and begin to fight, but Rose interrupts just as Deathstroke is about to kill Batgirl. He apologizes for betraying her trust and promises not to bother the Gordons anymore. The next day, Rose moves away to live with her mother, and Slade decides to take some time off and work on gradually rebuilding his relationship with her.
37	37	"#LivingTheNightmare"	Phil Allora and Natalie Wetzig	Juston Gordon-Montgomery	Wolf-Rüdiger Bloss, Diana Kidlaied, and Anna Lencioni	March 29, 2020 (Note: This episode was first released online on March 27, 2020.)	—	0.27
Noticing that the rest of her friends are having nightmares during a sleepover, Zee casts a spell to enter their minds via astral projection. Their dreams are plagued by their worst fears, and Zee soon discovers the cause - an imp named Fuseli, who is leaping from one girl's mind to another. Since Fuseli's power relies on a sleeper's fears and insecurities, which Zee claims not to have, she lures him into her own mind to gain the advantage as Zatanna. Fuseli, however, unleashes a dark duplicate of Zatanna and reveals that she does have one fear, of the devastation her magic might cause in the future. She overcomes her fear to defeat her duplicate and Fuseli, proclaiming that the magic is hers to do with as she chooses, and drags him into the real world upon waking up. With his power gone, the girls punish him by making him work at the Burrito Bucket.
38	38	"#AllAboutZee"	Noëlle Raffaele	Ryan Faust	Diana Kidlaied and Jennifer Shang	April 5, 2020	—	0.28
A chance encounter between Zee and a timid Metropolis High student named Casey Krinsky leads to a friendship between the two girls. Casey soon becomes obsessed with Zee, to the point of rearranging her social calendar and copying her outfit and hairstyle. She steals Zee's magic and switches bodies with her, then leaves to enjoy the day with the other girls while Zee pleads for help in vain. Discovering that Zee's friends are the Super Hero Girls, Casey steals their powers as well and re-styles herself as an amalgam of all six, bent on wiping out her old self. Zee lures Casey into a house of mirrors at the Metropolis Pier, where Casey tires herself out attacking her original body's reflections and eventually loses her stolen powers and appearance. Zee explains that she had been willing to be friends, but only if Casey was able to accept herself for what she was. Casey swears revenge against the Super Hero Girls and tries to reveal their civilian identities at school, but none of the other students pay her any mind, to her frustration.
39	39	"#TweenTitans"	Natalie Wetzig	Tim Sheridan	Erin Kavanagh	April 12, 2020	448	0.29
Jessica is scheduled to chaperone a birthday party for young Dick Grayson and his four friends at Wayne Manor, and Karen agrees to help her. After Bruce Wayne and Alfred Pennyworth leave, the children manifest their powers as the Tween Titans and begin running amok throughout the mansion as Robin, Beast Boy, Cyborg, Raven, and Starfire. Jessica tries to calm them down by providing activities and projecting an air of calm and maturity, but her efforts fail time after time. She and Karen prepare to use their own powers, only for Beast Boy to steal Jessica's Green Lantern ring and Karen's transformation locket. As the Titans suspend the two girls over a pit of tentacles conjured by Raven, they realize that the only way to get the Titans under control is to beat them at their own game. Karen goads Cyborg into breaking open her locket; when he does, a power surge allows her to transform into Bumblebee and catch Jessica's ring so she can become Green Lantern. The two heroes quickly subdue the Titans and put them to bed for a nap. A sleepwalking Raven repairs all the damage to the mansion just before Bruce and Alfred return, and Jessica and Karen speed away rather than accept another offer to look after the Titans.
40	40	"#EmperorPenguin"	Natalie Wetzig	M. A. Larson	Anna Lencioni and Jennifer Shang	April 19, 2020 (Note: This episode was first released online on April 17, 2020.)	—	0.28
Seeing that Hal Jordan is in low spirits before the state championship football game, Barbara decides to cheer him up by getting him a pair of hard-to-find athletic shoes. Harleen Quinzel suggests that Oswald Cobblepot, also known as "the Penguin" - a student who runs a series of dishonest rackets at Metropolis High - may be able to find a pair. In a deal for the shoes, Penguin manipulates Barbara into a position where one of his underlings can photograph her holding a set of stolen test answers, then uses the picture to blackmail her into helping with his schemes, but Barbara suits up as Batgirl to undo his plans. Just before the game, she steals Hal's lucky socks on Penguin's orders so that Metropolis High will lose and Penguin can make money selling souvenirs for the opposing team. As Hal falters badly and Metropolis High falls behind, Batgirl steals the socks back from Penguin and returns them. Hal rallies his team to win the game, and Batgirl also takes Penguin's phone. Afterward, Barbara exposes his blackmail plans to the entire student body, deletes all the photos he was using against them, and arranges for a famous quarterback and Metropolis High alumnus to give Hal the shoes as a present for winning the championship.
41	41	"#BreakingNews"	Phil Allora	Colleen Evanson	Wolf-Rüdiger Bloss	April 26, 2020	—	0.20
After Jimmy Olsen brings in photos of the Super Hero Girls stopping an attack by Killer Moth, Lois Lane decides to expose their civilian identities in her latest bid to secure an internship at the Daily Planet. Terrified at the prospect of having their secret revealed to the public, the girls dodge Lois' questions, plant false evidence at fight scenes to mislead her, and even try unsuccessfully to steal her story notes. As they gather dejectedly at Sweet Justice, having been unable to throw her off the trail, Killer Moth attacks Metropolis again. The strike distracts Lois long enough for the girls to slip out, assume their hero identities, and stop the attack. Afterward, Lois writes her story but does not send it to the Daily Planet, realizing that the good done by the Super Hero Girls is more important than her career aspirations. She shifts her attention to exposing Superman's identity and winning a Daily Planet internship away from a newly hired Clark Kent.
42	42	"#CrashCourse"	Noëlle Raffaele	M. A. Larson	Jackie Cole	May 3, 2020	456	0.20
Learning that the other girls all have driver's licenses except for Karen, who is two years too young to apply, Diana decides to get one of her own. She easily passes the knowledge test but struggles on the road test until Catwoman, Harley Quinn, and Livewire speed past in a stolen car. She races after them, with Karen, Garth Bernstein, and the examiner as passengers, and follows them through the city and onto the Metropolis Pier. The villains escape by jumping their car off the roller coaster tracks and onto a departing ferry, while Diana lands hers in the bay. Garth uses his powers as Aqualad to bring the group safely to shore, and Diana begs the examiner to give her another chance. This time, she follows all the traffic laws and uses navigational help from Karen to force the villains to crash into a dumpster at a construction site. Although she flips and badly damages the car to avoid hitting a family of ducks, she winds up perfectly parallel-parked at a curb and the examiner gives her a passing grade. With her new license in hand, she offers to give Karen a ride anywhere she likes, but Karen is so unnerved from the chase that she decides to take a bus instead.
43 44	43 44	"#LeagueOfShadows"	Noëlle Raffaele	Ryan Faust	Régis Camargo, Jackie Cole, Erin Kavanagh, and Diana Kidlaied	August 22, 2020	447	0.30
Kara has tickets to see her favorite heavy metal band, the League of Shadows, while Karen is excited over a show by the boy band Up Past 8. Mocking Karen's taste in music, Kara offers to take her to the League's show. They are invited backstage to meet lead singer Ra's al Ghul, who gives Kara one of his guitar picks as a reward for her support of the League. During the show, Karen becomes worried that the lyrics speak of world domination, but Kara pays no heed until Ra's sings a song that allows him to control her mind. She returns to the girls' hideout, rudely disrupts their leisure time activities, and steals Karen's Up Past 8 tickets. Suiting up as Bumblebee, Karen follows her to the show and finds the League watching from a skybox, ready to enact their plan to wipe out all evil in the world - starting with bad music. She realizes that Ra's is controlling Kara through the pick, which is made of red kryptonite, and is about to unleash her powers as Supergirl against Up Past 8. Responding to Bumblebee's call for help, the other Super Hero Girls, Barry Allen, Garth Bernstein, and Hal Jordan fend off Supergirl's attacks and drive Ra's' mind-control song out of her head. The kryptonite pick shatters, and Supergirl returns to normal and dances onstage to Karen's favorite music.
45	45	"#HousePest"	Juston Gordon-Montgomery	Gillian Berrow	John D. Anderson	September 20, 2020	—	0.15
While trying to return a backpack Diana left in the school library, the other girls discover that she has been living in a tree ever since she first came to Metropolis. Although she insists that she is following the tradition of Amazon warriors on a quest far from home, the girls offer to let her stay with them. Diana's sleeping/eating habits, unfamiliarity with modern home conveniences, and tendency to spear-fight in her sleep get her thrown out of one house after another. As she prepares to renounce her heritage, despondent over not being able to have the sort of home she remembers from Themyscira, she happens across Julia Kapatelis, an archaeology professor fascinated by Amazon culture. Diana happily settles into Julia's spare bedroom, surrounded by artifacts that remind her of home.
46	46	"#ItsComplicated"	Noëlle Raffaele	M. A. Larson	Jackie Cole and Erin Kavanagh	September 20, 2020 (Note: This episode was first released online on September 19, 2020.)	—	0.16
Seeing that Carol Ferris has a new boyfriend, the sensitive and romantic Thaal Sinclair, Hal Jordan decides to win her back. His attempts to embarrass Thaal in front of Carol fail, so he tries to prove himself better at romance, only to end up annoying Carol and tearfully begging her to give him another chance. To his surprise, she accepts and explains that she was only pretending to date Thaal to get Hal to change himself for her. Thaal, in turn, reveals that he was using Carol to get back at Hal, who had been his partner and best friend when they served together in the Green Lantern Corps but who suddenly broke off contact. Thaal manifests his powers as Sinestro of the Yellow Lantern Corps and attacks, with a free-for-all breaking out between him, Carol (as Star Sapphire), Jessica and Hal (as Green Lanterns), and Dex-Starr. Jessica urges Hal to apologize to the three villains, but Hal misinterprets her advice and expresses his regret for being such a great person. They accept his apology and the four leave to get ice cream, to her shock and exasperation.
47	47	"#TheBirdAndTheBee"	Noëlle Raffaele	Kristin Holloway	Jackie Cole	September 27, 2020	—	0.13
Karen notices that fellow Metropolis High student Carter Hall has been acting very morosely, both in class and while fighting crime as Hawkman. He explains that he is the reincarnation of Khufu, an Egyptian prince haunted by the memory of his true love, Princess Chay-Ara. A spell was cast on both of them, causing them to reincarnate and fall in love time after time, but Carter vaguely remembers that they always end up dying. Finding that Chay-Ara is now a musician named Shiera Sanders, Karen tries repeatedly to push Carter into a romance with her, but he always loses his nerve and flees before speaking to her. He eventually asks her out to dinner and is overjoyed when she accepts. Before he can meet her at the restaurant, though, a thief steals a ceremonial knife from the museum and attacks him with it. Suiting up as Hawkman, Carter recognizes the culprit as Hath-Set, the sorcerer who originally cast the spell and who always kills the couple. Karen suits up as Bumblebee to help fight him off, but he overpowers both heroes and prepares to kill Hawkman, reveling in the chance to destroy the couple's relationship once again. When Hawkman admits that he has not yet become Chay-Ara's lover in this life, Hath-Set departs but vows to return once he has. Carter breaks the date, accepting that it is the only way he can let Shiera be happy, as she leaves a sketch of him on the table.
48	48	"#FantasticBeastsAndHowToMindThem"	Phil Allora	Patrick Rieger	John D. Anderson, Wolf-Rüdiger Bloss, Diana Kidlaied, Angela Kim and Heejung Lim	September 27, 2020	—	0.12
Diana receives a care package from Queen Hippolyta and finds among its contents a large egg, which hatches into a baby griffin. Ignoring Jessica's warnings against trying to keep a wild animal as a pet, she names the griffin Steve and tries unsuccessfully to keep him under control and teach him obedience. Steve grows rapidly and develops the ability to fly, worsening the chaos he creates around Metropolis until a hydra begins to rampage through the city. Suiting up as Wonder Woman, Diana rides him into battle against the creature; together, they get its heads and necks so tangled up that it can no longer move. Wonder Woman recognizes the hydra as the product of a curse that was released when Steve broke an urn at home. Once she reassembles the urn, the hydra is drawn back into it and the curse ends. Finally understanding that Steve needs to be free, she takes him to Themyscira to live in the wild with other griffins.
49	49	"#SchoolGhoul"	Juston Gordon-Montgomery	Ryan Faust	Erin Kavanagh	October 4, 2020	—	0.14
Tatsu Yamashiro calls Diana for help investigating paranormal activity at McDougal Academy, the all-girls' boarding school she attends. Barbara and Kara answer in Diana's absence, and Tatsu sneaks them onto campus while warning them not to run afoul of the strict headmaster, Mr. McDougal. A female spirit has been roaming the dormitories at night and stealing items from the students' rooms; Tatsu has dubbed her the "Silver Banshee" and is determined to stop her. The three girls search the campus, with Kara poking fun at the other two and just missing repeated supernatural incidents. When the Silver Banshee confronts all three, Tatsu (as Katana) imprisons the spirit in her sword and learns the reason for the hauntings: her brother had killed her centuries ago in medieval Scotland, angry that she had been chosen over him to lead their family's clan. Katana releases the Banshee so she can confront her brother's descendant, the current headmaster. When the spirit shows him how she died, McDougal apologizes for his ancestor's crime and hands over the pin symbolizing leadership of the clan, allowing the Banshee to leave the campus in peace.
50	50	"#AwesomeAuntAntiope"	Natalie Wetzig	Ben Joseph	Vaughn Tada	December 19, 2020	—	0.33
When Diana was young, her aunt Antiope frequently diverted her from her studies with tales of fights against legendary creatures, to Queen Hippolyta's consternation. As the girls study on the day before their final exams, Antiope arrives in Metropolis to visit Diana and persuades them to take a break. The night culminates in a poker game against the Royal Flush Gang, from which Antiope and the girls flee in a stolen car to avoid being arrested by the police. As Diana berates Antiope for wasting the girls' entire night of study time, a reptilian creature called the Kraken surfaces and begins to attack Metropolis. The girls' attacks prove ineffective, and Antiope admits that most of her monster-hunting exploits were the result of problems she caused in the first place. Remembering her studies about the Kraken while on Themyscira, Diana leads the girls in a ritual to put it to sleep. Since Antiope forgot to change the lock on the Kraken's undersea cage and thus let it escape, Diana commands her to put it back in, taking pride in the sense of responsibility she learned from Hippolyta. Note: Lilly Aspell, who portrayed the young Diana in the films Wonder Woman and Wonder Woman 1984, provides the character's voice in this episode.
51 52	51 52	"#TheFreshPrincessOfRenFaire"	Juston Gordon-Montgomery	Lindsey Kerns	Alexandra Chiu, Diana Kidlaied, Cole Harrington and Heejung Lim	December 27, 2020	—	0.23
As the girls spend the day at a Renaissance fair, Diana and Zee disagree sharply over the atmosphere of the event and its depiction of princesses. Diana ridicules the lack of craftsmanship and noble traits on display, while Zee wants to indulge her fantasy of being a princess and thinks Diana is being overly serious. A surly concession stand cashier named Ember tries to stalk Zee over the course of the day, seeing her as an ideal princess, but chance misfortunes repeatedly foil her attempts. The clash between Diana and Zee culminates in the two girls storming off; once Zee is alone, Ember transforms into a dragon and takes her captive. Ember ties Zee up and places her in a room atop a tall tower on the fairgrounds, intending to eat her. Barbara, Jessica, Kara, and Karen are unable to overcome Ember's magic fire, and the dragon quickly traps them in a cage. As Ember discovers that Zee is not actually a princess, Diana (now suited up as Wonder Woman) returns to take up the fight. Zee is thrown clear of the tower, landing in a pigsty, and uses a protruding nail to free herself. With the aid of armor and a sword conjured by Zee, and riding a horse summoned from the fair's jousting grounds, Wonder Woman strikes a blow that reduces Ember to dust. As the girls start for home, Diana and Zee resume their dispute over what it means to be a princess, Barbara tries to compose a minstrel song about the fight, and Kara gorges herself on turkey legs.

=== Season 2 (2021) ===
A second and final season premiered on June 6, 2021.

No. overall	No. in season	Title	Directed by	Written by	Storyboard by	Original release date	Prod. code	U.S. viewers (millions)
53 54	1 2	"#AmBatgirl"	Juston Gordon-Montgomery	Jase Ricci	Wolf-Rüdinger Bloss and Cole Harrington	June 6, 2021	—	0.18
While investigating a jewelry store robbery with Bumblebee, Batgirl discovers that the Riddler is responsible and has left a clue to his next planned crime. The following night, she apprehends him at the Metropolis Museum, only for Robin to take credit for the capture when Batman arrives. As the two young heroes argue, the Riddler escapes and Batman leaves to track him down. A contest between Batgirl and Robin, to see who can catch more lawbreakers in an hour, ends with Robin unable to go on patrol due to a pulled muscle. Batman chooses Batgirl to help him foil the Riddler's next strike at the Metropolis Library; as they prepare to apprehend him, though, Robin barges in and accidentally lets him escape. Annoyed at Robin's poor performance, Batman makes Batgirl his new sidekick, leaving the girls crushed at the prospect that she will have to move back to Gotham City and leave them. With Batgirl gone, the rest of the girls bring in a succession of candidates in an attempt to fill her slot on their team. Katana's standards prove impossible to live up to, Bizarro Supergirl is too violent, and Catwoman steals everything she can from the hideout. Meanwhile, as Batman and Batgirl search Gotham City for information on the Riddler's whereabouts, Batgirl finds Robin living in an alley and takes pity on him for being abandoned. She tells him about the Riddler's plan to rob an armored car so he can make the capture and regain his status as Batman's sidekick. Receiving a silent nod of appreciation from Batman, she returns to Metropolis and her friends.
55	3	"#DoubleDanvers"	Jordan Rosato	Gillian Berrow	Caroline Director	June 13, 2021	—	0.19
Kara buys tickets to an upcoming show by one of her favorite punk bands, forgetting that she had already agreed to help her adoptive father, Jeremiah Danvers, present his latest inventions to billionaire Ted Kord that same night. She enlists her Bizarro counterpart to take her place at home and takes Jessica Cruz to the show, hoping to be picked to play onstage with the band. She, however, has to leave time after time to get Bizarro out of trouble, and her conscience eventually prods her to go home and fulfill her promise to Jeremiah. A mishap with an experimental laundry spray causes Bizarro to fly into a rage, forcing Kara to suit up as Supergirl and chase her down. Supergirl subdues Bizarro and saves Ted from falling to his death; Ted rejects Jeremiah's inventions but shows interest in his potential as a researcher, and Kara reluctantly attends an Up Past 8 concert as a favor to Bizarro.
56	4	"#AccordingToGarth"	Juston Gordon-Montgomery	Juston Gordon-Montgomery	Megan Rika Young	June 13, 2021	—	0.15
Kara's grades are so poor that her counselor advises her to join an after-school club to have any chance of passing for the semester. She rejects the other girls' suggestions but is drawn to a mecha-oriented media franchise whose fan club Garth Bernstein heads up. As she starts to develop an interest in remote-controlled robot fights, new student Winslow Schott challenges her to put her spot in the club at stake in a bout. Winslow cheats by using an EMP to disable Kara's robot, and Garth falsely claims the fight was fair so the two boys can enter a tournament at a local fan convention. Discovering that Winslow plans to cheat again in the finals, and distracted by the presence of Kara cheering for him in the audience, Garth publicly reveals the scheme and gets the team disqualified. Enraged at losing the tournament, Winslow (now adopting the supervillain identity of Toyman) grows his robot to giant size and rampages through the arena, but Kara suits up as Supergirl and destroys it to defeat him. Now back on good terms, she and Garth resume their after-school robot fights.
57	5	"#SuperWonderBatBeeZeeLanternMobile"	Jordan Rosato	Colleen Evanson	Ben Fosselman	June 27, 2021	—	0.13
Frustrated over not having their own vehicles, the girls decide to pool their money and buy a car. Promising not to argue over its use, they purchase a broken-down wreck from a junkyard, repair it, and equip it with crime-fighting technology. Tensions soon develop over what to call the car, who gets to drive it and when, and even how to use it to catch villains. The dispute quickly turns into a super-powered tug-of-war above Metropolis, which ends with the car falling into a parking lot and smashing to pieces. Chastened by the loss, the girls apologize to one another, seeing that trying to share the car and not letting themselves voice their disagreements were both bad ideas.
58	6	"#SirensConch"	Brianne Drouhard and Ben Jones	Laura Sreebny	Cole Harrington and Anna Lencioni	June 27, 2021	—	0.13
Jessica organizes a school talent show and fundraiser to protect a species of roach that has just arrived in Metropolis. Her plans to have Diana and Oliver Queen sing a duet for the finale are derailed by Diana's terrible singing voice. After trying in vain to improve on her own, Diana takes a magic conch shell from her home that had been used by the mythical Sirens to cause disasters through their hypnotic singing. The conch allows Diana to sing beautifully but also enthralls Oliver into releasing the roaches that Jessica has been raising at her home. They swarm through Metropolis, unaffected by the girls' attempts to stop them, but Diana gives up the conch and successfully corrals them with her bad singing that they mistake for their queen's screeches. The talent show is a success, with Oliver singing the finale alone, and Diana makes peace with the fact that she is not good at everything - at least, not yet.
59	7	"#AngerManagement"	Juston Gordon-Montgomery	Lacey Felix and Julia Layton	Wolf-Rüdinger Bloss	July 4, 2021	—	0.21
Seeing that Kara tends to express her anger in destructive ways, Jessica invites her to attend an after-school workshop to learn to deal with her emotions. Kara thinks little of the activities, saying that she should be free to express her anger as she sees fit as long as no one gets hurt. Jessica later hypnotizes Kara to perceive irritants as cute animals, while Pamela Isley becomes enraged at the city's plans to drain and pave over a lake and manifests her power as Poison Ivy to unleash a huge algae monster. Jessica and Kara suit up as Green Lantern and Supergirl to fight it, but are quickly engulfed. Green Lantern admits to having fear and anger issues of her own, which prompted her to try to help Supergirl. The revelation snaps Supergirl out of her hypnosis; with Green Lantern's help, she tears out the monster's central spore and throws it into the sun. Afterward, Jessica promises not to interfere in how Kara expresses her emotions, and Kara admits that Jessica actually helped her a bit in that respect.
60	8	"#HappyBirthdayZee"	Jordan Rosato	Rachel McNevin	Cole Harrington	July 4, 2021	—	0.21
Zee's expansive plans for her birthday irritate her friends, who find themselves unable to keep up with the effort and expense involved. After overhearing their complaints, she sulks at home and inadvertently casts a spell to brainwash them into obsessively doing everything she wants. Realizing that her magic has gone out of control, she flees for home, where her father Giovanni admits that her fixation on birthday parties stems from the day her mother left him. Giovanni strains to hold the other girls back as they storm the building, but warns Zee that she must find a way to counter the dark magic she inherited from her mother, which is powering the spell. Looking at the gift her friends have given her - a framed photo of the six - she remembers the love they share with one another and breaks the enchantment.
61	9	"#TheGreenRoom"	Brianne Drouhard	Ron Corcillo and Russ Carney	Chrissy Delk	July 11, 2021	—	0.17
After an alien creature attacks Metropolis, the Guardians of the Universe charge Jessica with dereliction of duty for failing to act aggressively to stop the threat. Hal Jordan volunteers to represent Jessica over her protests, but makes a fool of himself as Supergirl and Hawkman are called to testify for the prosecution. Just before the Guardians can render a verdict, Hal unexpectedly calls the creature to testify for the defense, having skimmed through a report Jessica wrote on the incident. It had learned of a bomb planted on Earth, powerful enough to destroy the planet, but it could not make itself understood until Jessica used her ring to translate its language. Despite well-meaning but uninformed attacks by Supergirl and Hawkman, the creature unearthed the bomb and threw it into space so that its explosion would do no damage. These details were included in Jessica's report, which the Guardians are embarrassed to admit they did not read. They acquit her, promise to read all official reports in the future, and agree to reconsider their policy emphasizing violence as the only solution to every crisis.
62	10	"#EnterNightSting"	Juston Gordon-Montgomery	Han-Yee Ling	Megan Rika Young	July 11, 2021	—	0.16
The girls' movie night in their hideout is interrupted by the arrival of Night Sting, a future version of Bumblebee. She warns Karen that something of hers has been taken, and that her world will be destroyed unless she recovers it within 60 minutes. After Night Sting disappears, Karen begins to lash out verbally at the others, who have a habit of failing to respect her and taking/using her possessions without asking. She relents upon finding an assortment of her favorite treats that they put together for her. Karen apologizes to the group and promises not to hold in her frustrations, and they in turn agree to be more considerate of her. Night Sting reappears, telling Karen that the missing item was her assertiveness and admitting that the end-of-the-world scenario was a ploy to help her recover it and avoid being a pushover forever. Infuriated, Karen vows never to become as abrasive and uncaring as Night Sting, causing the latter to disappear from the timeline.
63	11	"#WorldsFinest"	Jordan Rosato	Sammie Crowley	Caroline Director and Susan Nguyen	July 18, 2021	—	0.16
Tired of not getting the respect they feel they deserve as superheroes, Batgirl and Supergirl hire public relations specialist Max Lord as their agent. Their status rises rapidly with the help of leads and business opportunities that Max provides, but Jessica warns them not to let their egos jeopardize their friendship. Minor squabbles soon escalate into an ugly public argument during a press conference, and both girls storm out. Separately deciding to fire Max, they find him being held captive by Giganta, whom he had also taken on as a client in an unsuccessful attempt to boost her reputation as a supervillain. Batgirl and Supergirl apologize to one another and arrange their defeat of Giganta to give her the publicity Max could not, even if their own reputations sink a bit in the bargain.
64	12	"#WorkingStiff"	Brianne Drouhard	Colleen Evanson	Bryan K. Turner	July 18, 2021	—	0.14
Seeing that Karen needs money to buy replacement parts for her armor, Barbara persuades Shane O'Shaughnessy to hire her at the Burrito Bucket. Shane is so impressed by Karen's faithful adherence to company policy that he names her Employee of the Month and fires Barbara. Devastated, Barbara sets out to bring back legendary former employee Mitchell Mayo and prove to Shane that she knows what it means to take the job seriously, but Mitchell has been fired from multiple restaurants due to his obsessive perfectionism. Seeing Karen as a potential rival, he suits up as the Condiment King and fights Barbara (now suited up as Batgirl) and Karen. The two girls subdue him with the products of Barbara's lax attitude toward her job – a massive loaded burrito, an overstuffed napkin dispenser, and a slippery floor. Karen quits, having earned enough to fix her armor, and Shane reluctantly re-hires Barbara.
65	13	"#MultipliciZee"	Juston Gordon-Montgomery	Laura Sreebny and Shane Lynch	Wolf-Rüdinger Bloss	July 25, 2021	—	0.15
Zee wants to watch the latest season of one of her favorite TV shows, but Giovanni insists that she study a chapter from her spellbook first. She casts a spell to create a duplicate of herself, whom she names Bee and puts to work studying so she can watch the show. She copies herself again to take care of a performance at a birthday party, but discovers that her duplicates have begun to use the spell on their own. Metropolis is soon filled with duplicates of Zee, and Bee steals the book and finds a spell that will allow them to exist permanently. The girls are unable to get the duplicates under control until Zee admits to Bee that she feels incomplete without the aspects of her life that she passed off to the others. Bee returns the book so Zee can dispel all the duplicates, and Zee resolves to pay more attention to her studies, only to be immediately distracted by new seasons of her other favorite shows.
66	14	"#TheMinus"	Jordan Rosato	Moira Leeper	Cole Harrington	July 25, 2021	—	0.16
Diana is shocked to receive an A-minus on her report card, breaking her streak of all A's. Karen makes a list of Diana's multiple activities in an attempt to convince her that she is over-committing herself, but Diana misinterprets it as a need to drive herself even harder. Using a sacred fruit from Themiscyra that grants superhuman energy, she shifts frenetically from one pursuit to another. Worried about her, the other girls realize that she is using Karen's list as a way to keep her mind off her perceived academic failure. They try to take it from Diana, resulting in a super-powered chase through Metropolis that ends with Karen (as Bumblebee) telling Diana (as Wonder Woman) that even though she may make mistakes, she is still a good hero, student, and friend. Wonder Woman throws the list away, promising not to let grades harm her friendship with the others.
67	15	"#Powerless"	Brianne Drouhard	Ron Corcillo and Russ Carney	Bryan K. Turner	August 1, 2021	—	0.16
Toyman chases Garth Bernstein through a construction site, intent on revenge for being disqualified at the mecha convention tournament in "#AccordingToGarth". Bumblebee and Supergirl arrive to save Garth, but the robot's rocket fist knocks them halfway across Metropolis. The force of the blow damages Bumblebee's armor, leaving her unable to fly, and a chunk of gold kryptonite hidden in the fist strips Supergirl of her powers. As the two struggle to make their way back to the fight, Supergirl becomes despondent over her new human weaknesses, but Bumblebee inspires her by reminding her of incidents in which she was able to help people without using her powers. Bumblebee's armor starts working again as they return to the site, and she distracts Toyman while Supergirl races to save Garth from Toyman's Rube Goldberg-styled death trap. The kryptonite's effects wear off just in time for her to free him, and all three destroy Toyman's robot and leave him to be arrested by the police.
68	16	"#AcceptNoSubstitute"	Juston Gordon-Montgomery and Gina Gress	Anne Owen	Megan Rika Young	August 1, 2021	—	0.17
Seeing that her father Jim spends too much time doting on her, Barbara suggests that he take up a hobby. The next day at Metropolis High, she is shocked to discover that he has signed up to be the substitute teacher in her science class for the week. He inadvertently embarrasses Barbara time after time, oblivious to the other students' mockery of both her and him. At the end of the week, she finds that he has been working undercover at Batman's request to help the police catch art teacher Diego Dorrance, who has been stealing chemicals from the science lab to transform into the supervillain Bane. Jim pushes Barbara into a closet to keep her safe and fights Bane, but is soon overpowered; Barbara suits up as Batgirl and slips out to help Jim defeat him, then returns and changes back into her civilian identity before Jim can learn her secret. As the police take Bane into custody, Jim promises to give Barbara more space in the future.
69	17	"#TheWarriorAndTheJester"	Jordan Rosato	Colleen Evanson	Caroline Director	August 8, 2021	—	0.22
Harleen Quinzel visits Metropolis and gives Barbara an ear sliced off Batman's cowl during a fight with the Joker. Barbara treasures the ear, but Diana mistakes it for a whetstone and inadvertently destroys it while sharpening her sword. To get another one before Barbara learns the truth, Diana reluctantly travels to Gotham City with Harleen, who leads her on a meandering, frustratingly long tour of the area before revealing her plan: paint graffiti on a wall to get Batman's attention, then cut an ear off his cowl when he responds. Harleen suits up as Harley Quinn to attack Batman, but he quickly incapacitates her with a batarang. Returning to Metropolis, Diana finds that Barbara has discovered the missing ear and become distraught, but Harleen pretends to have traded it away and gives her a batarang instead, the same one that Batman used on her. Diana thanks Harleen for lifting Barbara's spirits and agrees to owe her a favor, but realizes that she is Harley; Harleen cashes in the favor by swearing her to secrecy.
70	18	"#MotherKnowsBest"	Cole Harrington	Rachel McNevin	Stevie Borbolla and Ben Fosselman	August 8, 2021	—	0.22
In preparation for a visit from Queen Hippolyta, Diana obsessively cleans the girls' hideout and insists that they be on their best behavior. She has sent Kara on a time-wasting errand to get her out of the way, worried about her brash nature, but Kara returns just in time for Hippolyta's arrival and the two quickly take a liking to one another. Diana tries to take Kara and Hippolyta on a tour of Metropolis, but becomes increasingly jealous of the two and annoyed at her mother's disapproval. They are followed all day long by a withered, shadowy figure - the goddess Lyssa, who absorbs enough of Diana's jealousy to regain her full power and fight the trio. Diana and Kara suit up as Wonder Woman and Supergirl, but Hippolyta continues to disparage Diana's fighting style. Wonder Woman apologizes to Supergirl for her inhospitable behavior, then tells Hippolyta that she can leave if she dislikes the person her daughter chooses to be. This outburst weakens Lyssa enough for Supergirl to knock her out of the city, and Hippolyta tells Wonder Woman she is proud of her before the two resume their tour.
71	19	"#DetentionClub"	Brianne Drouhard	Joan Ford	Bryan K. Turner	October 3, 2021	—	0.13
Kara, Zee, Garth Bernstein, Hal Jordan, and Pamela Isley are all serving detention in the Metropolis High library on a Saturday. Ignoring Principal Chapin's instructions to remain seated, Pamela sneaks out to retrieve a plant that she had been keeping in her locker. Hal helps her find it, but they are caught and the plant is confiscated. Chapin punishes all five students with another Saturday detention and assigns each of them an essay to write. Pamela reveals that the plant only blooms once every ten years; it last bloomed on the day she last saw her father and is about to do so again. Leaving Garth to write everyone's essays, Hal coordinates the others to steal the plant from Chapin's office. At the end of the day, Chapin - a secret Green Lantern fan who received a surprise visit from a suited-up Hal as a distraction - rescinds the extra detention. Pamela's plant produces a beautiful purple bloom as a reminder of her father. She rejects Hal's suggestion that they go out sometime, but secretly repays him by destroying the Metropolis High computer server so that his failing grade in gym class will not become public knowledge.
72	20	"#SmallVictories"	Gina Gress	Laura Sreebny	Megan Rika Young	October 3, 2021	—	0.15
Karen asks Diana for help in testing a new molecular amplifier as a way of getting her to feel more comfortable around modern technology. The two suit up as Bumblebee and Wonder Woman and set the equipment up at the junkyard. Bumblebee uses it on herself and quickly grows to twice Diana's height, but the amplifier malfunctions and causes her to start shrinking. After a bird attack that damages her armor, she sends Wonder Woman to find the part needed to reprogram the amplifier and must stop a cockroach from eating her. Without her smartphone or any physical or electronic currency, Wonder Woman has great difficulty finding the correct store and has to trade her sword for the part. Returning to the junkyard, she finds that it does not fit, but Bumblebee talks her through the programming sequence while fending off a hungry amoeba without her weapons. Once she is back to her normal size, the two heroes gleefully batter the amplifier to pieces.
73	21	"#CruzControl"	Jordan Rosato	Ryan Faust	Caroline Director	October 10, 2021	—	0.06
Jessica is running for class president of Metropolis High, but rival candidate Oswald Cobblepot upstages her message of hard work and integrity with a string of outrageous promises. She gets help from the other girls to boost her public image and moves ahead of Oswald in the polls, but he recruits Leslie Willis to make an extremely negative campaign ad that allows him to take the lead again. On the morning of the election, Jessica tries to be even more outrageous than Oswald but soon gives up the effort, telling the students that all she has to offer is her own honest effort to work on their behalf. Leslie suits up as Livewire to stage a kidnapping of the school mascot for Oswald to foil, then launches a real attack on the students out of anger over not being paid for her help with his campaign. Jessica neutralizes the threat on her own and finds public opinion turning in her favor once again.
74	22	"#WhySoBlue"	Cole Harrington	Ron Corcillo and Russ Carney	Lake Fama	October 10, 2021	—	0.08
Now employed by Ted Kord, Jeremiah Danvers brings Kara to work to see one of his experiments in progress. Kara quickly becomes bored and sneaks away, only to find that Ted has adopted the superhero identity of the Blue Beetle. Seeing his lack of experience, she suits up as Supergirl and offers to give him a few lessons in crime-fighting, but she ends up doing all the work herself instead of trying to teach him. Frustrated, the Blue Beetle storms off and soon runs into Livewire, against whom he is badly outmatched. Returning to the lab, Kara learns from Jeremiah that Ted had the patience to give him a second chance after their unfavorable initial meeting and realizes that she should have done the same. Supergirl comes to the Blue Beetle's aid and, by following a plan he devises, succeeds in freezing Livewire in a block of ice. The Blue Beetle promises not to try any superheroics until he has been properly trained, and Supergirl offers to return the favor he did for Jeremiah by giving him that training.
75	23	"#OneEnchantedEvening"	Gina Gress	Rachel McNevin	Drew Green and Megan Rita Young	October 17, 2021	—	0.08
Seeing her father Giovanni crying over a romantic movie and knowing that he has not dated since his wife left the family, Zee decides to help him start again. She sets him up for a dinner date with June Moone, Metropolis High's awkward and clumsy art teacher, but her attempts to make the night go smoothly backfire. While sneaking a bouquet of flowers into June's classroom, Zee discovers that she has been possessed by the Enchantress, a magician intent on destroying John. The Enchantress uses John's scarf, which Zee had used to tie the bouquet, to drain John's magic; while offering to give up her own in exchange for his life, Zee steals the scarf back and restores Giovanni to full strength. Giovanni and Zee combine their power to banish the Enchantress from Metropolis and save June. The two adults part ways, and Zee discovers afterward that John's crying was actually caused by the spicy nachos she had made for them to share.
76	24	"#TheAquamanCometh"	Jordan Rosato	Ron Corcillo and Russ Carney	Chelsea Holt	October 17, 2021	918	0.09
Garth Bernstein interrupts the girls' lunch to ask for their help during an impending visit by Aquaman. He has been sending letters home to the hero in Atlantis, but has falsely claimed many accomplishments in hopes of impressing Aquaman enough to choose him as a sidekick. Kara organizes the rest of the girls, plus Oliver Queen, Barry Allen, and Hal Jordan, to make Garth's accounts appear true. She suits up to play the role of his arch-nemesis and lets him "defeat" her, but Aquaman takes the fight seriously and prepares to drag her back to Atlantis for imprisonment. The situation quickly degenerates into a fight between Kara (as Supergirl) and Aquaman; Garth breaks it up by admitting that he fabricated all his exploits. Aquaman confides that he will make Garth his sidekick someday, recognizing the efforts of Garth's friends to help him and seeing in him the potential for a true hero.
77 78	25 26	"#NightmareInGotham"	Gina Gress and Jordan Rosato	Jase Ricci	Drew Green, Cole Harrington, and Bryan K. Turner	October 24, 2021	—	0.15
As Halloween approaches, the Joker escapes from Arkham Reform School and Barbara is excited to be able to go trick-or-treating with Harleen Quinzel in Gotham City. Diana persuades the other girls to go as well so she can secretly keep watch on Harleen, whom she alone knows to be Harley Quinn. During the outing, Barbara gets a call from Batman alerting her to the Joker's plans to make this Halloween the scariest one ever; at the same time, Harleen receives a call from the Joker asking for her help. The girls suit up and split into pairs to investigate three targets mentioned in Batman's call; Wonder Woman tries in vain to persuade Batgirl to break off her friendship with Harleen, without revealing the secret. The targets prove to be traps that lead to the release of the Gentleman Ghost, Solomon Grundy, and She-Bat, and Batgirl discovers that the Joker faked Batman's call to set his plan in motion. As the Joker and Harley lure the three villains to them, Wonder Woman tells Batgirl that Harleen is Harley. Batgirl refuses to believe her at first, but later accepts the truth after thinking about the events of "#TheWarriorAndTheJester". She and Wonder Woman reconcile, and all six heroes confront the villains as they begin causing mayhem throughout the city. The Joker and Harley capture Batgirl and Wonder Woman, and the Joker reveals his plan to destroy Gotham with a bomb that Harley is to detonate, much to Harley's hidden horror. While the other four heroes subdue their opponents, Batgirl unmasks herself as Barbara to persuade Harley not to help him. Harley pushes the detonator anyway and flees with the Joker, and Batgirl throws a batarang in an attempt to defuse the bomb. It does not explode, but she finds afterward that she missed her throw and that Harley had secretly disarmed it, suggesting that there may yet be hope for her to turn from evil. Note: This episode is followed by the crossover film, Teen Titans Go! & DC Super Hero Girls: Mayhem in the Multiverse, where most of the storylines of this season were resolved.

=== Crossovers ===
From 2020–2022, DC Super Hero Girls crossed over with another Warner Bros. Animation-produced and DC-based TV series, Teen Titans Go!.

Title	Directed by	Story by	Storyboarded by	Original release date	US viewers (millions)
"Superhero Feud"	James Krenzke	Amy Wolfram	Sean Glaze, Branko Kljajic, and Sean Kreiner	December 19, 2020	0.42
Control Freak forces the Teen Titans and the DC Super Hero Girls to compete on Family Feud.: Note: The events of the crossover special take place during the sixth season of Teen Titans Go!.
"Space House"	James Krenzke, Luke Cormican, and Ken McIntyre	Steve Borst and Brady Klosterman	Rob Lilly, Talya Perper, Christine Kwon, Josh Weisbrod, and Branko Kljajic	May 31, 2021	0.32
The Teen Titans set off on a four-part long adventure in outer space, only to find out they will be sharing their artificially intelligent Space House with the DC Super Hero Girls.: Note: The events of the crossover special take place during the seventh season of Teen Titans Go!.
"Teen Titans Go! & DC Super Hero Girls: Mayhem in the Multiverse"	Matt Peters and Katie Rice	Jase Ricci	Brianne Drouhard, David Gemmill, Chelsea Holt, Bryan K. Turner, Matthew Yang, and Megan Rika Young	May 28, 2022	0.18
When Lex Luthor forms the Legion of Doom and traps the world's superheroes in the Phantom Zone with an ancient Kryptonian amulet, the DC Super Hero Girls must save the heroes and stop the villains, with a little help of the Teen Titans.: Note: This is a crossover film between DC Super Hero Girls and Teen Titans Go!. It takes place after the final episode of the main series and during the seventh season of Teen Titans Go!.

=== DC FanDome shorts (2020) ===
Title	Directed by	Written by	Storyboard by	Original release date
"Babs' Vlog"	Unknown	Unknown	TBA	September 12, 2020 (online)
Karen helps Babs prepare to record her first vlog, but a few technical difficulties get in the way, starting with a missing camera.
"Lairs"	Unknown	Unknown	TBA	September 12, 2020 (online)
Jessica interviews Kara for the school newspaper and gets a few not-entirely-truthful answers to her questions.
