= DC Super Hero Girls (TV series) =

American children's animated action-adventure television series

- Promotional poster featuring (from left to right) Zatanna, Supergirl, Wonder Woman, Green Lantern, Bumblebee, and Batgirl.
- Genre: Action; Adventure; Comedy; Superhero
- Created by: Lauren Faust
- Based on: Characters by DC Comics
- Developed by: Lauren Faust
- Voices of: Grey Griffin; Tara Strong; Nicole Sullivan; Kimberly Brooks; Myrna Velasco; Kari Wahlgren
- Opening theme: "Super Life" by Kay Hanley and Michelle Lewis
- Composers: Michael Gatt; Stephen Skratt & Asher Lenz (Super Shorts)
- Country of origin: United States
- Original language: English
- No. of seasons: 2
- No. of episodes: 78 (list of episodes)

Production
- Executive producers: Lauren Faust (2019–20); Sam Register
- Producers: Leanne Moreau; Lisa Furlong-Jones
- Editors: Torien Blackwolf; Michael G. Buck
- Running time: 11 minutes
- Production companies: DC Entertainment; Warner Bros. Animation

Original release
- Network: Cartoon Network
- Release: March 8, 2019 – October 24, 2021

Related
- DC Super Hero Girls (2015)

DC Super Hero Girls is an American animated superhero television series created and developed by Lauren Faust and produced by Warner Bros. Animation and DC Entertainment for Cartoon Network. Based on the web series of the same name, the series premiered on March 8, 2019, with a one-hour special.

The series follows the adventures of teenage versions of Wonder Woman, Batgirl, Bumblebee, Supergirl, Green Lantern, and Zatanna who are students at Metropolis High School.

== Premise ==
The show focuses on six female teenage superheroes with secret identities: Diana Prince / Wonder Woman (voiced by Grey Griffin); Barbara "Babs" Gordon / Batgirl (voiced by Tara Strong); Kara Danvers / Supergirl (voiced by Nicole Sullivan); Zee Zatara / Zatanna (voiced by Kari Wahlgren), Jessica Cruz / Green Lantern (voiced by Myrna Velasco); and Karen Beecher / Bumblebee (voiced by Kimberly Brooks). The six girls meet at Metropolis High School and form a superhero team dubbed the "Super Hero Girls".

The show tells the coming-of-age stories of the Super Hero Girls, dealing with their choices and decisions regarding their superhero identities and their secret identities. The show focuses on physical comedy, emotional storylines, and a large gallery of villains.

== Cast and characters ==
=== Main ===
- Grey Griffin as:
  - Diana Prince / Wonder Woman, a princess of the Amazons in Themyscira, and the leader of the Super Hero Girls.
  - Lois Lane, an editor-in-chief of the Daily Planetoid at Metropolis High School.
  - Doris Zeul / Giganta, a bully at Metropolis High School.
- Tara Strong as:
  - Barbara "Babs" Gordon / Batgirl, the detective and technical expert of the Super Hero Girls, and Commissioner Gordon's daughter.
  - Harleen Quinzel / Harley Quinn, Babs's best friend.
  - Barbara Ann Minerva / Cheetah, Diana's rival.
- Nicole Sullivan as:
  - Kara Danvers / Supergirl, the muscle of the Super Hero Girls, and Superman's cousin.
  - Bizarro Kara / Bizarrogirl, a Bizarro version of Kara.
- Kimberly Brooks as:
  - Karen Beecher / Bumblebee, the technical expert of the Super Hero Girls, who can shrink to the size of a bee.
  - Eliza Danvers, Supergirl's adoptive mother.
- Myrna Velasco as Jessica "Jess" Cruz / Green Lantern, a part of the Green Lantern Corps, and the pacifist of the Super Hero Girls.
- Kari Wahlgren as:
  - Zee Zatara / Zatanna, the magic expert of the Super Hero Girls.
  - Carol Ferris / Star Sapphire, a student at Metropolis High School.
  - Julia Kapatelis, Diana's mother figure, whose daughter, Vanessa, is at college.

=== Supporting ===
- Fred Tatasciore as:
  - Commissioner Jim Gordon, a retired police commissioner from Gotham City, and Babs's father.
  - Mr. Chapin, the stern and understandably strict principal of Metropolis High School.
  - Dexter, a blue cat.
  - Cyrus Gold / Solomon Grundy, a burly supervillain.
- Phil LaMarr as:
  - Barry Allen / The Flash, a close friend of Babs.
  - Carter Hall / Hawkman, a friend of the Super Hero Girls.
  - Giovanni Zatara, a magician, and Zee's father.
  - John Stewart / Green Lantern, a part of the Green Lantern Corps.
- Max Mittelman as Kal-El / Clark Kent / Superman, Supergirl's cousin, and Lois's love interest.
- Keith Ferguson as:
  - Bruce Wayne / Batman, the protector of Gotham City.
  - Dick Grayson / Robin, Batman's bratty sidekick.
  - Alfred Pennyworth, Batman's butler.
  - Shane O'Shaughnessey, the manager of Burrito Bucket, and Babs's abusive boss.
  - Jeremiah Danvers, Supergirl's adoptive father.
  - Sinestro, a part of the Yellow Lantern Corps.
- Cree Summer as:
  - Selina Kyle / Catwoman (impersonating Eartha Kitt), the leader of the Super Villain Girls.
  - Hippolyta, the queen of the Amazons in Themyscira, and Diana's mother.
- Rina Hoshino as Tatsu Yamashiro / Katana, a friend of Diana.
- Mallory Low as Leslie Willis / Livewire, a bully of Metropolis High School.
- Will Friedle as:
  - Lex Luthor, the CEO of LexCorp and Superman's archenemy.
  - Arthur Curry / Aquaman, an Atlantean.
- Jason Spisak as Hal Jordan / Green Lantern, a part of the Green Lantern Corps, and the second-in-command/acting leader of The Invinci-Bros.
- Jessica McKenna as Garth Bernstein / Aqualad, a friend of the Super Hero Girls.
- Kevin Michael Richardson as Dex-Starr, Dexter's alter ego and a member of the Red Lantern Corps.
- Eddie Perino as Oliver Queen / Green Arrow, a friendly rival of Zee.
- Cristina Milizia as Pamela Lillian Isley / Poison Ivy, a neutral friend of Jessica.
- April Winchell as Antiope, Hippolyta's sister and Diana's aunt.

== Episodes ==
The new incarnation of DC Super Hero Girls debuted at the 2018 San Diego Comic-Con with the theatrical short #TheLateBatsby, which screened in theaters before the film Teen Titans Go! To the Movies. The online "Super Shorts" debuted on January 17, 2019, with #SuperSleeper on YouTube. The TV series debuted with the one-hour special #SweetJustice on March 8, 2019.

Season	Episodes	Originally released	
Season	Episodes	First released	Last released
Theatrical short		July 27, 2018	
Shorts	52	January 17, 2019	March 19, 2020
1	52	March 8, 2019	December 27, 2020
2	26	June 6, 2021	October 24, 2021
Crossovers	3	December 19, 2020	May 28, 2022
DC FanDome shorts	2	September 12, 2020	

== Production ==
Lauren Faust was approached by Warner Bros. to create and develop DC Super Hero Girls into a television series, after previously working on Super Best Friends Forever. The television iteration of the web series DC Super Hero Girls was announced in May 2017. Tara Strong and Nicole Sullivan reprise their roles as Batgirl and Supergirl respectively from Super Best Friends Forever, while Grey Griffin, who previously voiced Wonder Girl (Donna Troy) from the DC Nation Shorts, reprises her role as Wonder Woman from the web series. A year later, a poster showing the first look of the main characters was released. The series is animated by the Canadian studio Jam Filled Entertainment and Hasbro's Boulder Media from Ireland.

The writers chose to model each character and their personalities after a teenager archetype, while also drawing inspiration for several characters on their incarnations from the Silver Age of Comic Books. For the more modern Jessica Cruz, the writers heavily altered her characterization due to her original backstory contrasting heavily with the series' lighthearted tone.

Several writers for this series had previously worked on My Little Pony: Friendship Is Magic, another show created and developed by Faust. Also, her series is the second collaboration of Tara Strong and John de Lancie, who respectively voiced Twilight Sparkle and Discord on Friendship Is Magic.

Natalie Wetzig, a director on DC Super Hero Girls, referred to the second season of the show in an interview at the 2020 Annie Awards, but later clarified on the second half of season 1. Co-executive producer Amanda Rynda said the crew is "introducing lots of new villains and pushing the needle on new storylines" for season 2.

== Broadcast ==
The show premiered on Cartoon Network UK on 6 July 2019. It began airing on CITV in September 2020. All 52 episodes of Season 1 were available to watch on Netflix, but have since been removed.

== Other media ==
=== Video games ===
- DC Super Hero Girls Blitz — Budge Studios created a DC Super Hero Girls mobile game for Android and iOS devices which was released on August 8, 2019. It is a collection of microgames with difficulty-increasing-with-speed featuring the main heroines from the show, but some microgames needed to be bought separately each heroine to unlock those microgames.
- DC Super Hero Girls: Teen Power — a Nintendo Switch game published by Nintendo on June 4, 2021.

=== Graphic novels ===
Title	ISBN	Release date
At Metropolis High	978-1-4012-8970-6	15 October 2019
Powerless	978-1-4012-9361-1	17 March 2020
Weird Science	978-1-4012-9846-3	14 July 2020
Midterms	978-1-4012-9852-4	1 September 2020
Ghosting	978-1-77950-765-5	7 September 2021
Exchange Students	978-1-77950-891-1	25 January 2022

=== Novel series ===
Title	ISBN	Release date
Winner Takes All!	978-1984894533	19 November 2019
Fierce Competition!	978-1984894564	19 February 2020

== Reception ==
The series received generally mixed to positive reviews from critics. Emily Ashby of Common Sense Media described the series as fast-paced, focusing on teen heroes who use teamwork, and noted a strong messages about "girl power and the value of friendship" within the series.
