= Elissa Mielke =

Canadian singer/songwriter

Elissa Mielke is a Canadian singer/songwriter from rural Dundas, Ontario, Canada. Mielke lived in Japan and is based in Los Angeles and New York. Elissa released her first EP in 2015 under the pseudonym "Mieke." In 2021, Mielke released her second EP, "Finally" on Mom+Pop/Slashie labels under her full name. Pitchfork called her voice "an immense ocean of an instrument, as complex in its sweetness as raw honey." In 2022, Mielke released the single "Paper Moth Flame" which a finalist in CBC's searchlight series.. She is also known for starring in The Weeknd's "The Zone" music video featuring Canadian rapper Drake. She acted in Lion Attack's short film Mobius, which was chosen for the Critics' Week section at the 2017 Cannes Film Festival. In 2026, she released a single Don't Have to Hate You with LD Records, distributed by Secretly. She toured with M. Ward in 2023 for a Southern California tour promoting his new record.
