= Alyssa Underwood =

Australian cricketer

Cricket information
- Role: Wicket-keeper

Domestic team information
- Years: Team
- 1999/2000: Victoria

Career statistics
Competition	WLA
Matches	1
Runs scored	–
Batting average	–
100s/50s	–
Top score	–
Catches/stumpings	3/0
- Source: CricketArchive, 1 July 2021

Alyssa Underwood is a former Australian cricketer. A wicket-keeper, she played one List A match for Victoria during the 1999–2000 season of the Women's National Cricket League (WNCL), taking three catches.
