= Alyssa Giannetti =

American professional football player (born 1994)

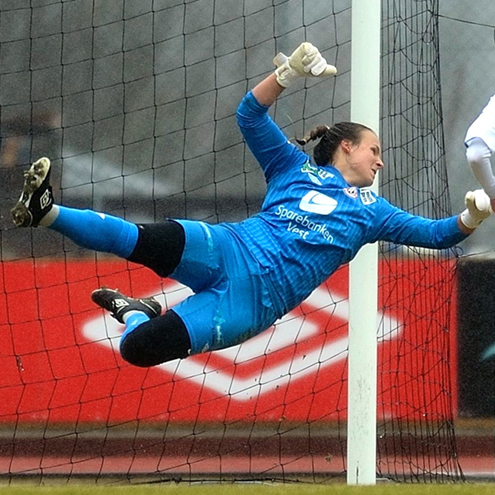
- Alyssa Giannetti in 2016

Personal information
- Full name: Alyssa Rose Giannetti
- Date of birth: October 28, 1994 (age 32)
- Place of birth: Fullerton, California
- Position: Goalkeeper

College career
Years	Team	Apps	(Gls)
2012–2015	Cal Poly Mustangs	77	(0)

Senior career*
Years	Team	Apps	(Gls)
2016–2017	Arna-Bjørnar	38	(0)
- * Club domestic league appearances and goals

Alyssa Rose Giannetti (born October 28, 1994) is an American professional soccer player. She plays the goalkeeper position.

== Youth career ==
Alyssa finished her youth career with Legends FC in Southern California.

== Collegiate career ==
Giannetti played four years (2012-2016) with California Polytechnic State University in San Luis Obispo, California She was named Big West Soccer Defensive Player of the Week three times, on November 4, 2013, August 31, 2015 and September 21, 2015.

Conference	School	Season	Appearances
Big West	Cal Poly San Luis Obispo	2012	19
Big West	Cal Poly San Luis Obispo	2013	19
Big West	Cal Poly San Luis Obispo	2014	20
Big West	Cal Poly San Luis Obispo	2015	19
Total			77(*)

(*) - Indicates school record

== Professional career ==
Giannetti began her professional career February 2016 with Arna-Bjørnar in the Toppserien, Norway's top women's league. During her rookie 2016 season, she started all 25 official matches during the season, including 22 in the Toppserien League. Giannetti was named the top keeper during the first half of the season.

After the 2016 season, she was named the Toppserien Goalkeeper of the Year by the Norway Football Association. She re-signed with Arna-Bjørnar for the 2017 season but left the club at the end of the season, returning to studies in the USA.

League	Club	Season	Appearances
Toppserien - Norway	Arna-Bjørnar	2016	25
Toppserien - Norway	Arna-Bjørnar	2017	25
