= Alyssa Micaela =

American singer-songwriter (born 1992)

- Birth name: Alyssa Micaela Bagley
- Born: May 28, 1992 (age 33); Odessa, Texas
- Genres: Country
- Website: alyssamicaela.com

Alyssa Micaela (born May 28, 1992) is an American country music singer and songwriter. Her debut studio EP, Cowboys Like That, was released on March 10, 2017.

== Early life ==
Alyssa Micaela was born on May 28, 1992, in the oil town of Odessa, Texas. She loves performing bilingual covers of Freddy Fender and Roy Orbison. Growing up she always admired Selena.

== Career ==
When Micaela was a teenager, she met Liz Rose, who played a huge role in getting Micaela to move to Tennessee and start her musical career. Rose has mentored Micaela, and co- wrote half of the songs on the Cowboys Like That EP.

Micaela has opened for artists such as Eli Young Band, Willie Nelson, Dierks Bentley, and Sam Hunt. Liz Rose Music and Warner/Chappell Music signed publishing agreements with Micaela.

Micaela's debut single and most popular song, "Getaway Car", was made into a music video that was aired on CMT in 2016. The song was featured on Spotify's Hot Country playlist, garnering over 3 million streams. Her second single, "Clean Break," was also featured on Spotify's Hot Country playlist as well as New Boots and Wild Country, garnering over 2.4 million streams.
