= Lyssa =

Greek goddess of madness and rage

- Goddess of rage and madness
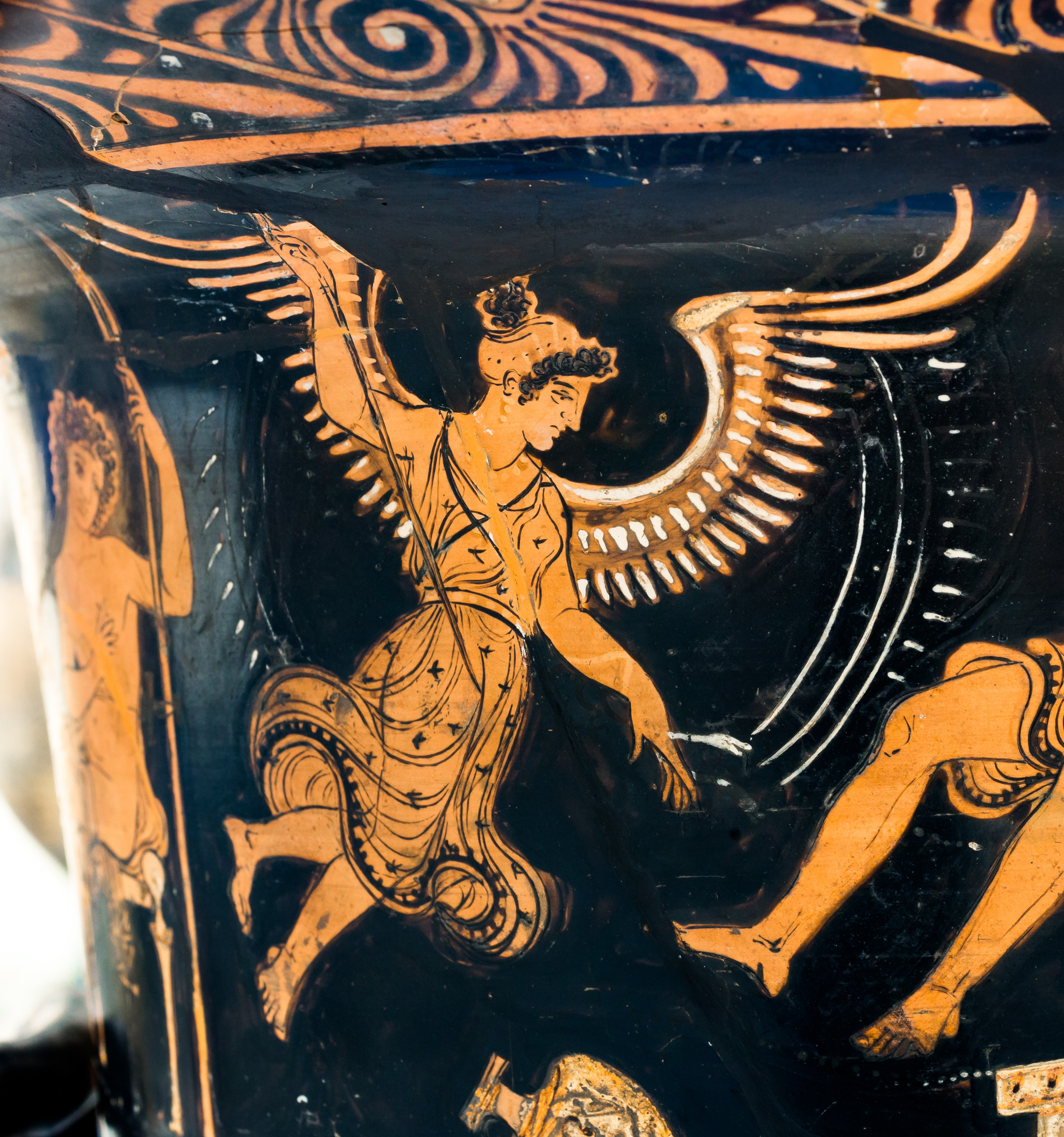
- Lyssa depicted as a winged figure, surrounded by a nimbus and wielding a goad. Apulian red-figure kalyx-krater, c. 360–350 BC.
- Animals: Dog
- Mount: Chariot

Genealogy
- Parents: Uranus (father); Nyx (mother)
- Siblings: Thanatos, Hypnos, Erinyes, several more

Equivalents
- Roman: Ira, Rabies

In Greek mythology, Lyssa (/ˈlɪsə/, LIH-sə; Ancient Greek: Λύσσα, romanized: Lússa, lit. 'rage, rabies'), also called Lytta (/ˈlɪtə/; Λύττα) in Attic Greek, is a minor goddess and the spirit of rage, fury, and rabies in animals. In myth, Lyssa is often portrayed driving people insane and leading them to their doom, and would occasionally be portrayed as a dog.

She was closely related to Mania, the personification of various forms of madness and insanity. Because of their close connection and the uncertainty over whether they are the same figure, twins, or distinct personifications, Lyssa and Mania are often confused with one another, although both are generally presumed to be daughters of Nyx. Her Roman equivalents were variously named Ira, Furor, or Rabies. Sometimes she was multiplied into a host of Irae and Furores.

The viral genus Lyssavirus, which includes the causative agent of rabies, was named after this goddess.

== Etymology ==
The Greek noun λύσσα derives from the word λύκος (lúkos), meaning "wolf". Because seeds of alyssum were used (unsuccessfully) to treat rabies, the flower was named after the disease with the prefix α- in front, meaning without. Thus Lyssa is the etymological origin of the feminine name Alyssa.

== Family ==
In Euripides' play Herakles, Lyssa is identified as the daughter of the night-goddess Nyx and the blood from Uranus' wound following his castration by his son Cronus. The 1st-century Latin writer Hyginus lists Ira (Wrath, Lyssa) as the daughter of Terra (Gaia) and Aether. Lyssa could be occasionally portrayed as a dog.

== Function ==
=== Literature ===
In Euripides' tragedy Herakles, Lyssa and the messenger goddess Iris are called upon by Hera to inflict the hero Heracles with insanity. However, Lyssa disagrees with Hera's plans, and unsuccessfully attempts to persuade Iris to refuse their orders. When she fails, Lyssa gives in and sends Heracles into a mad rage that causes him to murder his wife and children. In her scenes, Lyssa is shown to take a temperate, measured approach to her role, professing "not to use [her powers] in anger against friends, nor [to] have any joy in visiting the homes of men."

Aeschylus identifies her as being the agent sent by Dionysus to madden the impious daughters of Cadmus, who in turn dismember their kinsman Pentheus.

=== Artworks ===
In a number of ancient Greek vases Lyssa appears on the scene of the death of Actaeon, the hunter who was transformed into a deer and devoured by his own hounds for seeing Artemis naked or trying to woo Semele. In a 440s BC red-figure bell-krater by the Lykaon Painter, Lyssa stands to the right of Actaeon, inflicting his dogs with rabies and directing them against him. It has been theorised that the vase depicts the events of the myth as dramatised in Athenian tragedian Aeschylus' lost play Toxotides which dealt with Actaeon's death, although this assertion is far from certain.

In a different vase with Actaeon's death, Lyssa is present along with Aphrodite, Eros, Artemis and a woman that could be Semele, indicating a sexual nature of Actaeon's grave offence which led to him being eaten by his own rabid dogs.

Lyssa also had a role in the myth of Lycurgus, the Thracian king who tried to ban the worship of Dionysus, the god of madness. In an Apulian vase from around 350 BC, the winged Lyssa supplants Dionysus as the deity causing Lycurgus to attack and kill his wife and son.

== See also ==
- Erinyes
