= Elissa Cameron =

New Zealand wildlife biologist

Elissa Cameron FRSNZ
- Other name: Elissa Zanna Cameron
- Education: Massey University
- Scientific career
- Workplaces: University of Canterbury; University of Tasmania
- Thesis: Maternal investment in Kaimanawa horses (1999)
- Doctoral advisor: Edward Minot, Kevin Stafford and Clare Veltman

Elissa Zanna Cameron FRSNZ is a New Zealand wildlife biologist whose research includes animal behaviour, ecology and conservation biology. In 2025 Cameron was elected as a Fellow of the Royal Society Te Apārangi.

== Academic career ==
After graduating from Massey University with a PhD titled Maternal investment in Kaimanawa horses in 1999, Cameron moved to the University of Nevada, Reno from 2002 to 2006. She worked at the University of Pretoria from 2006 to 2010. She was promoted to full professor in November 2018 at the University of Canterbury.

In March 2025 Cameron was elected as a Fellow of the Royal Society Te Apārangi "for being an international leader in wildlife biology and conservation management".

== Selected works ==
- David G Hamilton; Menna E. Jones; Elissa Z Cameron; Douglas H Kerlin; Hamish McCallum; Andrew Storfer; Paul A Hohenlohe; Rodrigo K Hamede (9 December 2020). "Infectious disease and sickness behaviour: tumour progression affects interaction patterns and social network structure in wild Tasmanian devils". Proceedings of the Royal Society B. 287 (1940) 20202454. doi:10.1098/rspb.2020.2454. ISSN 0962-8452. PMID 33290679. Wikidata Q104130290.
