= Alyssa Jacey =

American singer-songwriter (born 1981)

- Alyssa Jacey in 2021

Background information
- Born: 1981 (age 44–45); La Jolla
- Origin: United States
- Genres: Country, pop
- Occupations: Dancer/choreographer, singer/songwriter, inspirational career coach
- Instruments: Guitar and drums

Alyssa Jacey (born 1981) is an American singer-songwriter and dancer/choreographer. As an indie artist, Jacey self-publishes her work.

== Biography ==
Alyssa Jacey was born in La Jolla, a seaside neighborhood within the city of San Diego. She is a singer/songwriter and a dancer/choreographer, beginning her singing career in Los Angeles. She later moved to San Diego to finish college. Notably, in 2003 she danced during the halftime show of the Super Bowl XXXVII. Her debut album Closed Eyes... ...Open Heart was released in 2005. In 2013 she was nominated for a Nashville Independent Music Award for "Best Live Country Performer(s)".

== Style ==
Jacey's work is categorized as pop/rap. John Apice of Americana Highways, a website dedicated to americana, reviewed her live album Alyssa LIVE! and noted that she likes to talk in between songs: "(...) her between-song banter is friendly & joyful in an early Joni Mitchell voice."

== Discography ==
=== Studio albums ===
- Closed eyes... ...open heart, 2005
- Here's to change, 2010
- On the spot, 2012
- Destined, 2014

=== EP's ===
- Alyssa Jacey, 2005
- The soul, 2006
- Turning points, 2009
- Heart breathe, 2015
