= Lisa =

Lisa or LISA may refer to:

== People ==
=== People with the mononym ===
- Lisa (Japanese musician, born 1974), stylized "LISA"
- Lisa (Japanese singer, born 1978), stylized "lisa"
- Lisa (South Korean singer) (born 1980)
- Lisa (Japanese musician, born 1987), stylized "LiSA"
- Lisa (rapper) (born 1997), Thai rapper, member of K-pop group Blackpink
- Lisa (French singer) (born 1997)

=== People with the name ===
- Lisa (given name), a feminine given name
- Lisa (surname), a list of notable people with the surname

== Places ==
=== Romania ===
- Lisa, Brașov
- Lisa, Teleorman
- Lisa, a village in Schitu, Olt
- Lisa River

=== United States ===
- Fort Lisa (Nebraska) (1812–1823), a trading post in the US
- Fort Lisa (North Dakota) (1809–1812), a trading post in the US

=== Elsewhere ===
- Lisa, Ivanjica, a municipality in Serbia
- Lisa, Ogun, a village in Ifo, Ogun State, Nigeria
- La Lisa, a municipality of Havana, Cuba

== Arts, entertainment and media ==
=== Films ===
- Lisa (1962 film) or The Inspector, a drama starring Stephen Boyd and Dolores Hart
- Lisa (1990 film), a crime thriller film starring Staci Keanan and Cheryl Ladd
- Lisa (2001 film), a French romantic war film starring Marion Cotillard
- Lisa, an Indian Malayalam-language film series
  - Lisa (1978 film), first in the series
  - Veendum Lisa (1987), second in the series

=== Other uses in arts, entertainment, and media ===
- Lisa (TV series)
- Lisa Lisa and Cult Jam, an American band
- "Lisa", a 1960 single by Jeanne Black
- Lisa: The Painful, a post-apocalyptic role-playing video game
- Lisa Lisa and Cult Jam, an American band
- "Lisa", a main lyric theme by Franz Waxman from the Rear Window film
- Lisa Amma or Lisamma, a fictional character in Indian films including Lisammayude Veedu (2006)
- Lisa (magazine)
- Mona Lisa

== Organizations ==
- LISA Academy (Little Scholars of Arkansas), a public charter high school in Little Rock, Arkansas
- Localization Industry Standards Association, from 1990 to 2011 a Swiss-based trade body concerning the translation of computer software
- Louisiana Independent School Association, a defunct athletic association of segregation academies

== Science and technology ==
=== Computing ===
- Lisa (computer chip), graphics assistance chip in the Amiga computer in 1992
- LISA (Language for Instruction Set Architecture)
- LISA (organization), the USENIX special interest group for system administrators
- Apple Lisa computer, the precursor to the Apple Macintosh
- Library and Information Science Abstracts, an abstracting and indexing tool designed for library professionals
- Lisa assembler, a 6502 assembler for Apple II
- LISA+, a traffic engineering software package for microsimulation
- Lisp-based Intelligent Software Agents, a production-rule system implemented in the Common Lisp Object System (CLOS)

=== Other uses in science and technology ===
- Laser Interferometer Space Antenna, previously called eLISA (Evolved Laser Interferometer Space Antenna), a planned European Space Agency space mission designed to measure gravitational waves
  - LISA Pathfinder, a technology demonstrator for eLISA
- Local indicators of spatial association, statistics that evaluate the existence of clusters in the spatial arrangement of a given variable
- Tropical Storm Lisa (disambiguation), various hurricanes, cyclones and a tropical storm

== Other uses ==
- Lisa (mythology), a creator deity in Dahomeyan religion
- Liaison Interne Satellite Aérogare, one of the two shuttle rail lines of CDGVAL at Charles de Gaulle International Airport
- Lifetime ISA, a UK savings and investment product

== See also ==
- Lisa Lisa (born 1967), American actress and lead singer of the Cult Jam
- Elizabeth (disambiguation)
- Leesa (disambiguation)
- Liisa (given name)
- Liza (disambiguation)
