= Lisa (given name) =

- Pronunciation: /ˈliːsə/
- Gender: Female

Origin
- Languages: English, Italian
- Meaning: God's promise

Other names
- Related names: Elizabeth, Liz, Eliza, Lisha

Lisa is a feminine given name. In the United Kingdom, the name Lisa began to gain popularity during the 1960s, by 1974 it was the fifth most popular female name there, and a decade later it was the 14th most popular female name there. However, by 1996 it had fallen out of the top 100. Similarly, in the United States it was the most popular female name for most of the 1960s and in the top 10 through most of the 1970s before falling.

== People ==
- Lisa (French musician) (born Lisa Gautier, 1977) French singer performing as "Lisa"
- Lisa (Japanese musician, born 1974) stylized "LISA", Elizabeth Sakura Narita, member of the Japanese hip-hop group m-flo
- Lisa Marie Abato (born 1966/1967), American pornographic actress turned anti-pornography activist
- Lisa Aisato (born 1981), Norwegian illustrator and author
- Lisa Aldali (born 1989), Austrian politician
- Lisa Allen (born 1981), British chef
- Lisa Ambalavanar, English actress
- Anna Lisa Andersson (1873–1958), Swedish reporter
- Lisa Ann (born 1972), American pornographic actress
- Lisa Arce (born 1969), beach volleyball player
- Lisa Arrindell (born 1969), American actress
- Lisa Ashton (born 1970), English darts player
- Lisa Aukland (born 1958), American bodybuilder and powerlifter
- Lisa Aziz (born 1962), British television presenter
- Lisa Banes (1955–2021), American actress
- Lisa Barbuscia (born 1969), American model, singer and actress
- Lisa Barlow (born 1974), American television personality and businesswoman
- Lisa Bayliss-Pratt (born 1976), British nurse
- Lisa Feldman Barrett (born 1963), American psychological scientist and neuroscientist
- Lisa Barros D'Sa, British director and actress
- Lisa Batiashvili (born 1979), Georgian musician
- Lisa Beamer (born 1969), American writer
- Lisa Bevill (born 1961), American musician
- Lisa Bloom (born 1961), American lawyer
- Lisa Blount (1957–2010), American actress
- Lisa Blunt Rochester (born 1962), American politician
- Lisa Bodnar, American nutritional and perinatal epidemiologist
- Lisa Bonder (born 1965), American tennis player
- Lisa Bonet (born 1967), American actress
- Lisa Bowman (born 1988), Irish netball player
- Lisa Boyle (born 1964), American model
- Lisa Brennan-Jobs (born 1978), American author and daughter of Steve Jobs
- Lisa Brenner, American actress
- Lisa Bruijnincx (born 2001), Dutch rower
- Lisa Butcher (born 1971), British model
- Lisa Jo Chamberlin (born 1972), American convicted murderer
- Lisa Chappell (born 1968), New Zealand actor
- Lisa Coleman (born 1960), American musician and composer, member of The Revolution
- Lisa Collins (born 1968), Australian actress
- Lisa Cross (born 1978), British bodybuilder
- Lisa Curry-Kenny (born 1962), Australian swimmer
- Lisa D'Amato (born 1980), model and contestant in America's Next Top Model
- Lisa Dahlkvist (born 1987), Swedish football player
- Lisa D'Amour, American dramatist
- Lisa De Leeuw (born 1958), American pornographic actress
- Lisa Desjardins (born 1972), American political journalist
- Lisa Dillon (born 1979), English actress
- Lisa DiMartino, American politician
- Lisa Dorrian, Irish woman who has been missing since 2005
- Lisa Durupt, Canadian actress
- Lisa Dwan (born 1977), Irish actress
- Lisa Ekdahl (born 1971), Swedish singer
- Lisa Eldridge (born 1974), British make-up artist
- Lisa Edelstein (born 1966), American actress
- Lisa Edmonds (born 1967) English wheelchair basketball player
- Lisa Edwards (born 1958), Australian singer and musician
- Lisa Eichhorn (born 1952), American actress, writer, and producer
- Lisa Eilbacher (born 1957), American actress
- Lisa Erlandsdotter (1774–1854), Swedish artist
- Lisa Evans (born 1992), Scottish footballer
- Lisa Faulkner (born 1972), English actress and TV presenter
- Lisa Fischer (born 1958), American vocalist and songwriter
- Lisa K. Fitzpatrick, American infectious disease physician, epidemiologist
- Lisa Anne Fletcher (1844–1905), American poet and correspondent
- Lisa Foiles (born 1986), American actress
- Lisa Fonssagrives (1911–1992), Swedish model
- Lisa Franchetti (born 1964), American Navy admiral
- Lisa Frank (born 1955), American artist and businesswoman
- Lisa Franks (born 1982), Canadian paralympic athlete
- Lisa Ann French (1964–1973), American murder victim
- Lisa Frenkel, American pediatrician, professor
- Lisa Fuillerat (1965–2017), American murder victim
- Lisa Gastineau (born 1959), American former model, reality TV star
- Lisa Gastoni (born 1935), Italian actress
- Lisa Germano (born 1958), American singer/songwriter
- Lisa Gervasoni (born 1969), Australian artist
- Lisa Gerrard (born 1961), Australian musician, singer and composer
- Lisa Gherardini (1479–1542), namesake and possible model for the Mona Lisa
- Lisa Gilroy (born 1989), Canadian actress and comedian
- Lisa Glasberg (born 1956), American radio personality
- Lisa Gleave (born 1976), Australian actress and model
- Lisa Gnadl (born 1981), German politician
- Lisa Guerrero (born 1964), American journalist
- Lisa Gunning, English film director, editor and writer
- Liisa Hallamaa (1925–2008), Finnish ceramist
- Lisa Hanawalt (born 1983), American illustrator and TV producer
- Lisa Hanna (born 1975), Jamaican politician and beauty queen
- Lisa Hannigan (born 1981), Irish singer-songwriter
- Lisa M. Hansen, American producer, actress, director, and writer
- Lisa Harper (born 1963), American Christian author, bible educator, and speaker
- Lisa Harrington (born 1965), Canadian writer
- Lisa Harriton, American singer-songwriter, keyboardist and sound designer
- Lisa Harrow (born 1943), New Zealand actress
- Lisa Hartman Black (born 1956), American actress and singer
- Lisa Haydon (born 1986), Indian actress, TV presenter and model
- Lisa Heller, American singer, songwriter and philanthropist
- Lisa Hilton (born 1974), British author
- Lisa Ho (born 1960), Australian fashion designer
- Lisa Hochstein (born 1982), Canadian-American television personality
- Lisa Hoffman (born 1954), American businesswoman
- Lisa Holm (1998–2015), Swedish murder victim
- Lisa Höpink (born 1998), German swimmer
- Lisa Hurtig (born 1987), Swedish footballer
- Lisa Jakub (born 1978), Canadian writer, yoga teacher, and former actress
- Lisa Jawahir, Saint Lucian politician
- Lisa Jewell (born 1968), British author
- Lisa Johnson, American photographer
- Lisa A. Johnson (born 1967), American diplomat
- Lisa Joyner (born 1966), American television personality
- Lisa Linn Kanae, Hawaiian professor
- Lisa Kehler (born 1967), English race walker
- Lisa Kelly (born 1980), American trucker
- Lisa Kelly (born 1977), Irish classical singer
- Lisa Kern (born 1983), German politician
- Lisa Kleypas (born 1964), American author
- Lisa M. Koonin, American public health official
- Lisa Kudrow (born 1963), American actress
- Lisa Lambe (born 1983), Irish singer and performer
- Lisa Lampanelli (born 1961), American comedian
- Lisa Lashes (born 1971), English electronic dance music DJ and producer
- Lisa Lavie (born 1983), Canadian singer-songwriter
- Lisa Leslie (born 1972, American basketball player
- Lisa Lilja (born 1996), Swedish sprinter
- Lisa Lillien, American entrepreneur
- Lisa Lines, Australian historian
- Lisa Ling (born 1973), American journalist
- Lisa Lockhart (born 1965), American barrel racer
- Lisa Loeb (born 1968), American musician, author and actress
- Lisa Lois (born 1987), Dutch singer
- Lisa Lopes (1971–2002), American rapper, singer, songwriter, dancer, and former member of TLC
- Lisa Lopez, Tejano singer
- Lisa Loring (1958–2023), American actress
- Lisa Lu (born 1927), Chinese actress
- Lisa Lucas (born 1961), American actress and journalist
- Lisa Lynas (born 1981), Northern Irish badminton player
- Lisa Mainiero (born 1957), American writer and management professor
- Lisa Manoban (born 1997), stage name Lisa, Thai rapper, singer, dancer, actress, and member of BLACKPINK
- Lisa Martin (disambiguation), multiple people
- Lisa Marx (born 1981), American guitarist and member of Kittie
- Lisa McClain (born 1966), American politician
- Lisa McCune (born 1971), Australian actress
- Lisa McGee (born 1980), Northern Irish screenwriter and playwright
- Lisa McGrillis (born 1982), British actress
- Lisa McPherson (1959–1995), American scientologist
- Lisa McVey (born 1967), American police officer and motivational speaker, kidnapping victim of Bobby Joe Long
- Lisa Meness, Former Chief of the Algonquins of Pikwàkanagàn First Nation
- Lisa Middelhauve (born 1980), German singer
- Lisa Millar (born 1969), Australian television presenter and journalist
- Lisa Ann Millican (1969–1982), American murder victim
- Lisa Mirabello, American medical geneticist
- Lisa Mitchell (born 1990), Australian musician
- Lisa Monaco (born 1968), American attorney
- Lisa Moorish (born 1972), British singer
- Ivory (wrestler) née Lisa Moretti (born 1961), American wrestler
- Lisa Murkowski (born 1957), American lawyer and politician
- Lisa Naalsund (born 1995), Norwegian footballer
- Lisa Nandy (born 1979), British politician
- Lisa Niemi (born 1956), American actress, widow of Patrick Swayze
- Lisa Nowak (born 1963), American astronaut; arrested for attempted kidnap and attempted murder
- Lisa Ono (born 1962), Japanese-Brazilian bossa nova singer
- Lisa Origliasso (born 1984), Australian musician, member of The Veronicas
- Lisa Ortiz, American voice actress
- Lisa Osofsky, British-American lawyer
- Lisa Oz (born 1963), American author and radio host
- Lisa Parks (born 1967), American media scholar
- Lisa Paus (born 1968), German politician
- Lisa Brix Pedersen (born 1996), Danish discus thrower
- Lisa Jane Persky (born 1955), American actress
- Lisa Pfitzmann (born 1998), German politician
- Lisa Piccirillo (born 1990 or 1991), American mathematician
- Lisa Powell (born 1970), Australian field hockey player
- Lisa Marie Presley (1968–2023), American singer, daughter of Elvis Presley
- Lisa Randall (born 1962), American theoretical physicist
- Lisa Ray (born 1972), Canadian actress
- Lisa Raymond (born 1973), American tennis player
- Lisa Richter (born 1977), Canadian poet
- Lisa Rinehart, American dancer
- Lisa Rieffel (born 1975), American actress and singer
- Lisa Rinna (born 1963), American actress
- Lisa Robin Kelly (1970–2013), American actress
- Lisa Rogers (born 1971), Welsh television presenter
- Lisa Rubin (born 1977), Canadian theatre director
- Lisa Ruddy, Canadian actress who was a cast member on the Canadian sketch comedy TV series You Can't Do That on Television
- Lisa Ryder (born 1968), Canadian actress
- Lisa Salters (born 1966), American journalist
- Lisa Scott, Australian film producer
- Lisa Scott-Lee (born 1975), British singer, member of Steps
- Lisa Scottoline (born 1955), American writer
- Lisa See (born 1955), American writer
- Lisa Selesner, known as Lisa S. (born 1978), American international model, actress and veejay
- Lisa Simes (born 1976), Canadian artistic gymnast
- Lisa Simone (born 1962), American singer, composer and actress
- Lisa Marie née Lisa Marie Smith (born 1968), American model and actress
- Lisa Snowdon (born 1972), English television presenter
- Lisa Stahl (born 1965), American actress
- Lisa Stansfield (born 1966), British singer
- Lisa Steier (1888–1928), Swedish ballerina
- Lisa Stokke (born 1975), Norwegian actress and singer
- Lisa Su (born 1969), Taiwanese-American executive
- Lisa Thon, Puerto Rican fashion designer
- Lisa Tucker (born 1989), American singer
- Lisa Unger (born 1970), American author
- Lisa Vanderpump (born 1960), American television personality and businesswoman
- Lisa Marie Varon (born 1971), American bodybuilder, fitness competitor, and wrestler
- Lisa Velez (born 1967), singer, better known as Lisa Lisa
- Lisa Vicari (born 1997), German actress
- Lisa Vidal (born 1965), American actress
- Lisa Vultaggio, Canadian actress
- Lisa Wallace, Big Brother 2009 contestant
- Lisa Ann Walter (born 1963), American actress
- Lisa Walton (born 1975), New Zealand field hockey player
- Lisa Welander (1909–2001), Swedish neurologist
- Lisa Whelchel, American actress, author, speaker and singer
- Lisa Wilcox (born 1964), American actress
- Lisa Willner, American politician
- Lisa Wooding (born 1979), English field hockey player
- Lisa Wu, American actress and television personality
- Lisa Yamada (born 2002), American actress
- Lisa Yamanaka, Canadian actress and voice actress
- Lisa Yaszek, American professor
- Lisa Yee (born 1959), American writer
- Lisa Yuskavage (born 1962), American artist
- Lisa Zaar (born 2000), Swedish tennis player
- Lisa Zaiser (born 1994), Austrian swimmer
- Lisa Zane (born 1961), American actress and singer
- Lisa Zimmermann (born 2003), German artistic gymnast
- Lisa Zimmermann (born 1996), German freestyle skier
- Lisa Zimouche (born 1999), French freestyle footballer
- Lisa Zukoff (born 1962), American politician
- Lisa Zunshine (born 1968), American scholar of literature and cognitive science
- Lisa Zwerling, American physician
- List of names starting with Lisa

== Fictional characters ==
- Lisa, a character from the animated film, Ponyo
- Lisa, a character in the film 1978 pornographic movie Debbie Does Dallas
- Lisa, a character in the 1981 American slasher movie The Prowler
- Lisa, a character in the television show Home Improvement
- Lisa, a character in the 2005 American science fiction adventure Zathura: A Space Adventure
- Lisa, a character played by Nicole Eggert in the 2008 Television movie A Christmas Proposal
- Lisa, a character in the movie 2009 American comedy film The Hangover
- Lisa Asparagus, a character and Junior's mom in the video series VeggieTales
- Lisa Burnett, founder and President of SPS
- Lisa (1990 film), a 1990 film starring Cheryl Ladd, featuring a character named Lisa
- Lisa (2001 film), a 2001 film starring Marion Cotillard, featuring a character named Lisa
- Lisa, mythical girlfriend of the Internet Oracle
- Lisa, portrayed by Juliette Danielle, the female lead in Tommy Wiseau's film The Room
- Lisa in the film Weird Science
- Lisa, one of the protagonists of the book series featuring Gaspard and Lisa
- Lisa Minci, a character in 2020 video game Genshin Impact
- Lisa Armstrong, the titular character of the video game Lisa: The Painful
- Lisa Braeden, a character in the television series Supernatural
- Lisa Chadway, a character in the 1997 American drama television movie Deep Family Secrets
- Lisa Cuddy, a character in House M.D.
- Lisa Davis, a character in the 1980 American disaster comedy movie Airplane!
- Lisa Dingle, a character in the popular British soap opera Emmerdale
- Lisa Douglas, the socialite wife of Oliver Wendell Douglas in the 1960s sitcom Green Acres
- Lisa Fortier, a fictional voodoo priestess portrayed by Pam Grier in the blaxploitation film Scream Blacula Scream (1973)
- Lisa Carol Fremont, a character played by Grace Kelly in Alfred Hitchcock's film Rear Window (1954)
- Lisa Garland, a character in the video game franchise Silent Hill
- Lisa Grimaldi, a character in the soap opera As the World Turns
- Lisa Haglund, a character of the Bert Diaries novels series
- Lisa Hamilton, a character in the Dead or Alive video game series
- Lisa Hayes, a character in the American television sitcom Diff'rent Strokes
- Lisa Hayes, a main character in the Robotech television series
- Lisa Heffenbacher, a character from the TV series The Electric Company
- Lisa Imai, character from mixed-media franchise, BanG Dream!
- Lisa Kramer, a character in the 2004 American romantic comedy movie Along Came Polly
- Lisa Landry, a character from the American sitcom Sister, Sister
- Lisa Loud, a character from The Loud House
- Lisa Miller a character from the graphic novel series Scott Pilgrim
- Lisa McDowell, a character in the 1988 American romantic comedy film Coming to America
- Lisa Nelson, the main character in the 1975 novel The Girl Who Owned a City
- Lisa Niles, a character in the American soap opera General Hospital
- Lisa Rogan, a character from The House of the Dead
- Lisa Rowe, a charismatic sociopath portrayed by Angelina Jolie in the film Girl, Interrupted
- Lisa Simpson, a character in the TV Show The Simpsons; she is the daughter of Homer and Marge Simpson
- Lisa Snart, a DC supervillainess known as Golden Glider
- Lisa Yadomaru, a vizard and former lieutenant, later captain in manga Bleach
- Lisa Tepes, wife of Count Dracula and mother of Alucard in both the video game and animated series Castlevania
- Lisa Trevor, a character in the horror survival series games "Resident Evil"
- Lisa Turtle, a character in the teen show Saved by the Bell
- Lisa Watmough, a character in Robert Swindells's book Room 13
- Lisa Wilbourn, a character in the novel Worm (web serial)
- Princess Lisa, a character in Tolstoy's book War and Peace

== See also ==
- Search for "Lisa"
- Leeza Gibbons, American talk show host
- Liisa (given name)
- Lisa (disambiguation)
- Lisa (surname)
- Lessa (surname)
