= Leisa =

Leisa is a feminine given name. Notable people with the name include:

- Leisa Goddard, Australian television journalist
- Leisa Goodman, American Scientologist
- Leisa King, English field hockey player

== See also ==
- Lisa (given name)
