= Miina Härma Gymnasium =

School in Tartu, Estonia

- Miina Härma Gümnaasium
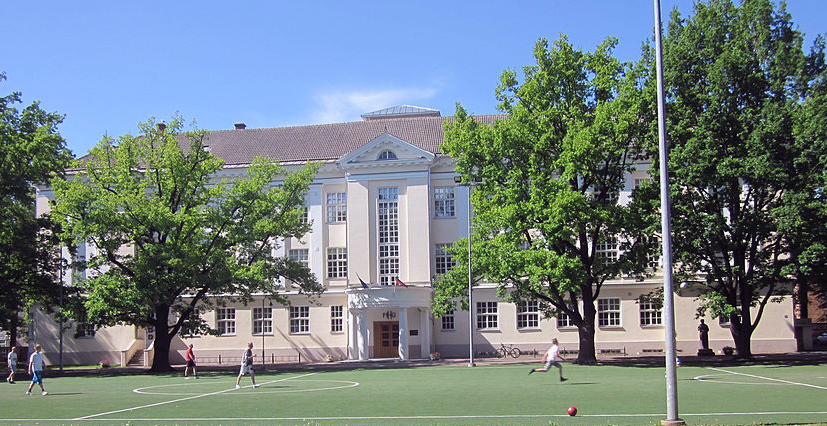

Location
- Jaan Tõnissoni 3 Tartu, Tartu County, 50409; Estonia
- Coordinates: 58°22′36″N 26°42′32″E

Information
- School type: State-funded secondary school
- Established: 1906
- Founder: ENKS
- Status: Open
- Director: Ene Tannberg
- Grades: 1–12
- Language: Estonian, English
- Newspaper: Tabula Rasa
- Website: miinaharma.ee

Miina Härma Gymnasium (Estonian: Miina Härma Gümnaasium; abbreviated as MHG) is an institution composed of a primary school and a secondary school in Tartu, Estonia. The school holds a special emphasis on languages. Miina Härma Gymnasium is an IB World School offering the Diploma Programme and the Primary Years Programme, and a candidate school for the Middle Years Programme.

== History ==
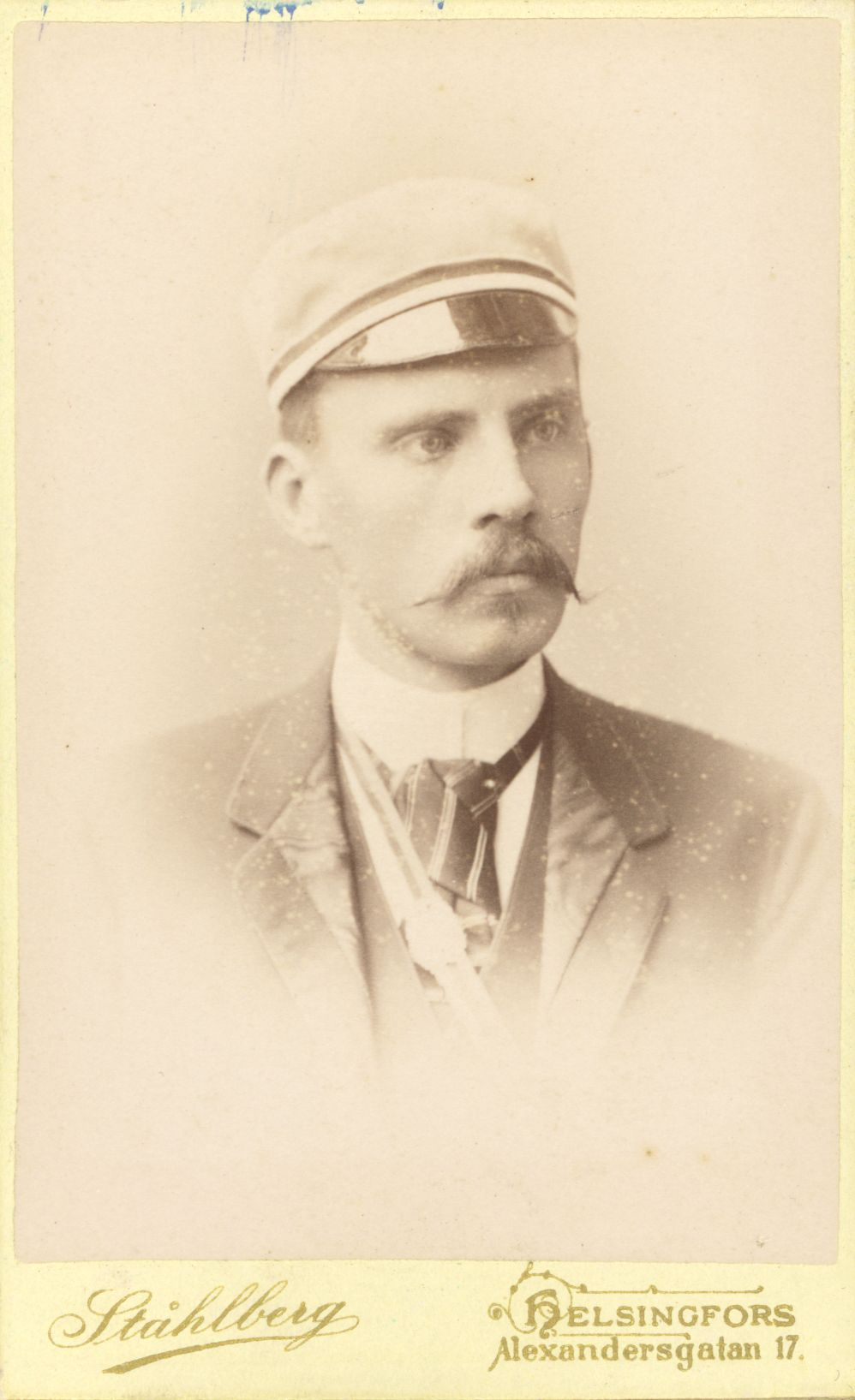
Oskar Kallas, one of the school's founders and its first director

After the Estonian national awakening had ended the Estonian people were still left under the supremacy of German language and culture. This meant that the upper class mostly spoke German. The first generation of ethnic Estonian intellectuals, who were mostly men, did not stop using Estonian language but were educated primarily in the German language.

At the beginning of the 20th century Estonian intellectuals such as Jakob Hurt, Oskar Kallas, Jaan Tõnisson and many others decided to tackle the problem by founding a secondary school for girls. In order to obtain a permission to do that an association had to be started. This association was established in 1906 and was the Estonian Youth Education Association (Estonian: Eesti Noorsoo Kasvatuse Selts; abbreviated as ENKS). The opening ceremony of the school was held on 1 September 1906 by the Julian calendar and it was named Estonian Youth Education Association's Secondary School for Girls. Its first director was Oskar Kallas, the second Peeter Põld.

== School building ==
Despite having the plan to build its own school house from the start, the school spent its early years moving from place to place. It was caused by the unanticipated costs of building a suitable school house and political conflicts. A contest was run in Finland to design a suitable building for the school, but the winning design turned out to be too costly. Thus, it was adjusted by the engineers Aleksander Raudsepp and Fromhold Kangro to fit the budget of financiers.

The cornerstone of the school house was installed on 1 June 1914 according to the project of Georg Hellat. A year later the school building was complete, but the school was unable to move in due to the beginning of World War I. Instead of letting the school to move in, the authorities decided to place there the Austrian prisoners of war. In 1917 it was occupied by a military hospital. A year later the German military took possession of the building. Shortly after the communists did the same. It was only in 1921 that the school was finally able to move into its designated building.

Since the school operated several years without a building of its own, it had to rent rooms in a number of places. The first year was spent in 24 Jaani St. after which they moved to 74 Tiigi St. In spite of the unfavorable conditions for studying the school operated there until 1915. The school was moved out of there in hope of finally moving into its newly built schoolhouse. Unfortunately, they could not do that. The school found shelter at the commercial school of 6 Fortuuna St., the business school of H. Margens and 12 Holmi St. In 1919 the whole school moved to the building of Hugo Treffner Gymnasium in Rüütli St. Finally, in 1921 they succeeded in moving into their own school building. In 1944, the school was named the Tartu City Secondary School No. 2. In 1954, the school was reorganized into a coeducational school for girls and boys. In 1964, in conjunction with Estonian composer and choir director Miina Härma's 100th birthday, the school was renamed the Miina Härma Gymnasium.

== Curriculum ==
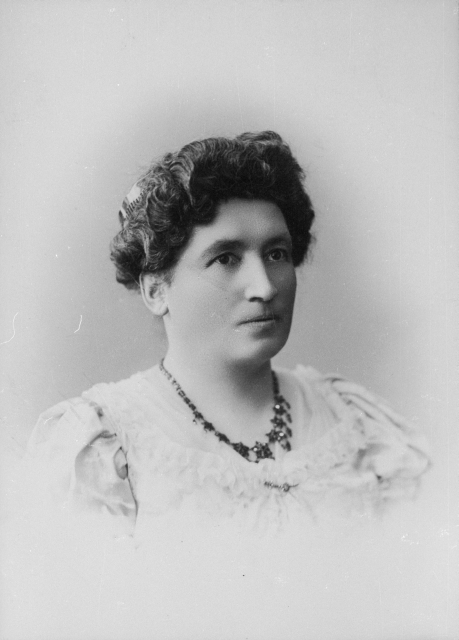
Miina Härma, the school's namesake since 1964

Miina Härma Gymnasium serves students from form 1 to 12. Students can enter based on an entrance exam, which is taken in the spring of each year. Students who have reached the final round in a national olympiad are not required to take the entrance test.

Although the school has aptitude for languages, it still lets students pick from four departments: social, humanities, life sciences and IB programme. The choice of departments starts to matter from the 11th form. In addition the school provides a wide variety of extracurricular activities such as choir and folk dancing.

== International studies ==
Together with the Ministry of Education and Research and Tartu City Government, Miina Härma Gymnasium is preparing to implement the continuum of International Baccalaureate programmes (Primary Years, Middle Years and Diploma) to serve the educational needs of children who temporarily visit Tartu and neighbouring counties due to their parents' mobility. Implementing the IBO programmes takes a couple of years of preparatory work, at the end of which the school is officially authorised by the IBO.

Miina Härma Gymnasium has gained authorisation to teach the Diploma Programme (for students aged 16–19) and the Primary Years Programme (for students aged 7–11). It is in the candidacy phase for the Middle Years Programme, estimated time of authorisation is in 2018. In the 2016/17 academic year, MYP grades 1-2 are opened, in the academic year MYP grades 3-4 follow. No tuition fee is charged in the IB Programmes, in the candidacy phase the implementation of the IB pedagogy is in process.

== Newspaper ==
Throughout the years, Miina Härma Gymnasium has had several different newspapers. The first was published from 1929 to 1940 and was named Karuohakas after Hans Karu, the school's headmaster during that period. It spoke of the life in school, country's history and students’ creative works. In the year 1996 the newspaper Härmakakk was published.

The current newspaper, Tabula Rasa, was established in 1998. It means clean slate in Latin. The first publication won the prize of the best school newspaper in Estonia. In the following years it has also won many other prizes.

== Notable alumni ==
- Jaak Aaviksoo (born 1954), physicist and politician, since August 31, 2015 rector of Tallinn University of Technology
- Meelis Friedenthal (born 1973), writer and politician
- Igor Gräzin (born 1952), legal scientist, lawyer and politician
- Sass Henno (born 1982), writer
- Tanel Joamets (born 1968), pianist and teacher
- Rasmus Kaljujärv (born 1981), actor
- Jaan Kirsipuu (born 1969), cyclist
- Tiiu Kirsipuu (born 1957), sculptor
- Asko Künnap (born 1971), designer, poet and head of advertising agency
- Madis Lepajõe (1955–2020), cyclist, sports figure and politician
- Jürgen Ligi (born 1959), politician
- Aleksei Lotman (born 1960), biologist and politician
- Helmi Mäelo (1898–1978), writer and social activist
- Ülo Õun (1940–1988), sculptor
- Liisa Past (born 1980), civil servant, political, communication and cyber security expert
- Heljo Pikhof (born 1958), politician
- Priit Pullerits (born 1965), journalist
- Laura Põldvere (born 1988), singer
- Sander Pärn (born 1992), rally driver
- Toomas Sildmäe (born 1959), entrepreneur, politician and motorsportsman
- Rain Simmul (born 1965), actor
- Margit Sutrop (born 1963), philosopher, ethicist, academic, and politician
- Aino Talvi (1909–1992), actress
- Riin Tamm (born 1981), geneticist and science populariser
- Lauri Vahtre (born 1960), politician, historian, translator and writer
- Heiki Valk (born 1959), archaeologist and historian
- Margarita Voites (born 1936), opera singer
- Aleks Sats (1914-1992), director, writer and actor
