= Liisi =

- Gender: Female
- Language: Estonian, Finnish

Origin
- Region of origin: Estonia, Finland

Other names
- Derived: Lisa
- Related names: Lisa, Liisa, Liis

Liisi is a Finnish and Estonian female given name. Its nameday is on 19 November. It originated as a variation of the name Lisa.

== Notable people ==
Some notable people who have this name include:

- Liisi Beckmann (1924–2004), Finnish artist
- Liisi Kivioja (1859–1925), Finnish educator, politician and banker
- Liisi Koikson (born 1983), Estonian singer
- Liisi Ojamaa (1972–2019), Estonian poet, translator, literary critic and editor
- Liisi Oterma (1915–2001), Finnish astronomer
- Liisi Rist (born 1991), Estonian cyclist

== See also ==
- Lisa (given name)
