= Liis =

Female given name

- Gender: Female
- Language: Estonian
- Name day: 19 November

Origin
- Region of origin: Estonia

Other names
- Related names: Liisa, Liisi, Liisi, Liisu

Liis is an Estonian feminine given name and may refer to:

- Liis Emajõe (born 1991), footballer
- Maarja-Liis Ilus (born 1980), singer
- Liis Klaar (born 1938), sociologist and politician
- Liis Kullerkann (born 1991), volleyballer
- Liis Lass (born 1989), actress
- Liis Lemsalu (born 1992), singer
- Liis Lepik (born 1994), footballer
- Liis Lindmaa (born 1988), actress
- Liisu Mägi (1831–1926), folk singer
- Liis Pello (born 1988), footballer
- Ene-Liis Semper (born 1969), video artist, performance artist, scenographer and theatre director
- Nele-Liis Vaiksoo (born 1984), singer and actress
- Liis Viira (born 1983), composer, harpist, and animator
