= Leesa =

Leesa may refer to:

== People ==
- Leesa Clark, American television journalist
- Leesa Gazi (born 1969), Bangladeshi playwright
- Leesa Kahn (born 1949), Australian film producer
- Leesa Vlahos (born 1966), former Australian politician

== See also ==
- Lisa (given name)
- Liisa (given name)
- Elizabeth (given name) (Liza)
