= Toomas Sildmäe =

Estonian entrepreneur, politician, motorsportsman, and sportsman

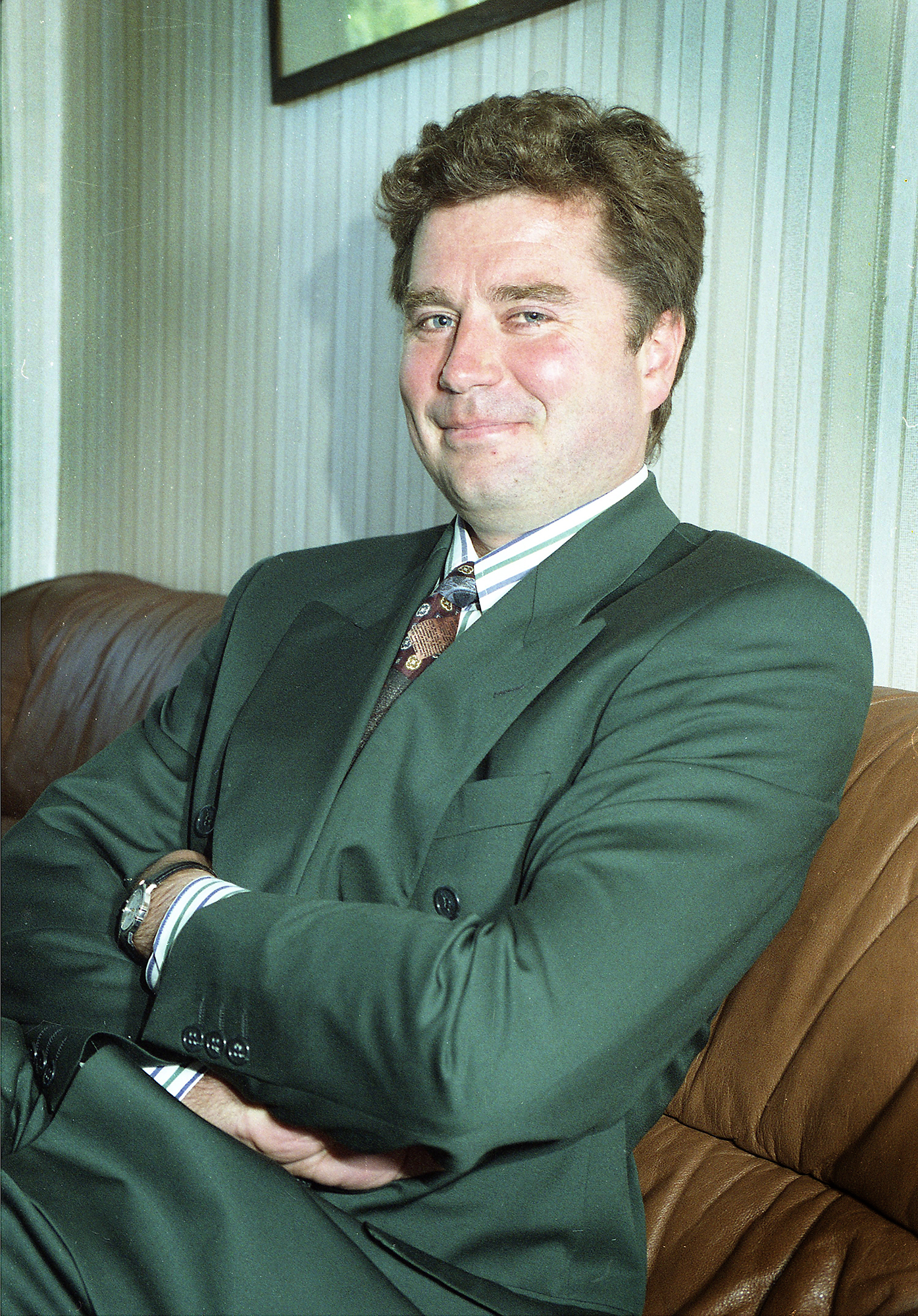
Toomas Sildmäe in 1993

Toomas Sildmäe (born 21 February 1959 in Tallinn) is an Estonian entrepreneur, politician, motorsportsman and sportsman.

Sildmäe graduated from Tartu Secondary School No. 2 (now, Miina Härma Gymnasium). In 1980, he graduated cum laude from Tartu State University's Department of Economics. In 1990, while heading the Palace Hotel in Tallinn, he was granted permission to import Western newspapers from Finland into Estonia.

From 1988 until 1999, Sildmäe was involved in motorsports. In 1997 he reached 11th place in the World Rally Championship and 9th place in the European Championship. Together with Margus Muraka, he won gold in 1999, silver in 1998 and silver in 1997, in Estonian races in car class N 2000+. From 1993 to 2009, Sildmäe was the president of the Estonian Motorsport Association (released from office after a drunken traffic accident), from 2009 until 2012, he was a member of the board.

Since 2010, he has been the chairman of the supervisory board of Audru circui court. From 1994 until 2001, he was a board member of the Estonian Sports Confederation, from 2000 until 2001, he was a member of the Estonian Olympic Committee, from 2001 until 2004, a member of the executive committee of the Estonian Olympic Committee, and from 2001 until 2005, a representatives member.

From 1993 until 1994, he was Minister of Economic Affairs. He was also the Honorary Consul to the Embassy of Spain in Estonia from 1999 to 2009.
