= Western Carolina University =

Public university in Cullowhee, North Carolina, US

- Former names: Cullowhee Academy (1889–1905); Cullowhee Normal & Industrial School (1905–1925); Cullowhee State Normal School (1925–1929); Western Carolina Teachers College (1929–1953); Western Carolina College (1953–1967)
- Type: Public university
- Established: August 5, 1889; 137 years ago
- Founder: Robert Lee Madison
- Parent institution: University of North Carolina
- Accreditation: SACS
- Endowment: $130 million (2022)
- Chancellor: Kelli R. Brown
- Provost: Richard D. Starnes
- Faculty: 548 full-time and 228 part-time (spring 2023)
- Administrative staff: 967
- Students: 11,877 (spring 2023)
- Undergraduates: 10,145
- Postgraduates: 1,732
- Location: Cullowhee, North Carolina, United States; 35°18′35″N 83°11′00″W
- Campus: 589 acres (2.38 km^{2}); Distant town
- Newspaper: The Western Carolinian
- Colors: Purple and gold
- Nickname: Catamounts
- Sporting affiliations: NCAA Division I FCS – SoCon
- Website: wcu.edu

Western Carolina University (WCU) is a public university in Cullowhee, North Carolina, United States. It is part of the University of North Carolina system.

The fifth oldest institution of the sixteen four-year universities in the UNC system, WCU was founded to educate the people of the western North Carolina mountains. Enrollment for the fall 2020 semester was 12,243 students.

== History ==
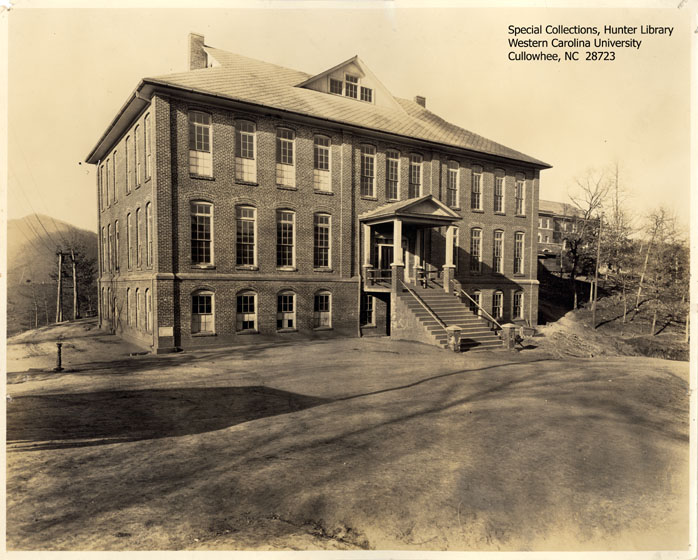
The Joyner Building served as a combination classroom, auditorium, and administration facility from its completion in 1913 until the 1930s, when other buildings relieved pressure on Joyner. It was destroyed by fire in 1981, at which time it was the oldest building on campus.

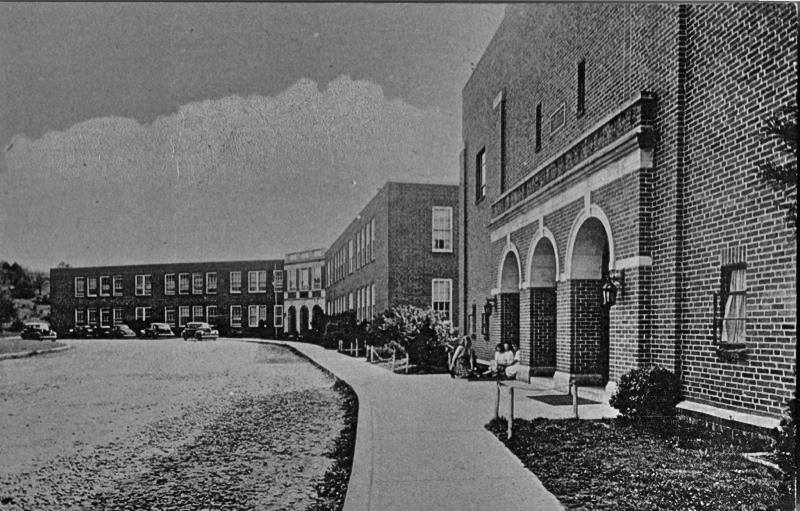
McKee Training School & Hoey Auditorium, two of many buildings on Campus built with help from the Works Progress Administration during the late 1930s and early 1940s. McKee Hall, as it has since been rechristened, was named for Gertrude Dills McKee, who was a great supporter of the university throughout her public life.

In 1888, the residents of Cullowhee desired a better school for the community than was offered in public schools of that day, organized a board of trustees and established a community school that came to be known as Cullowhee Academy. Founded in August 1889 as a semi-public secondary school and chartered as Cullowhee High School in 1891 (also called Cullowhee Academy), it served the Cullowhee community and boarding students from neighboring counties and other states. The founder, Robert Lee Madison, wanted to provide an education for the young people in the region and train teachers to spread education throughout the western part of the state. In 1893, through the efforts of Walter E. Moore, representative from Jackson County, the North Carolina Legislature authorized an appropriation for the establishment of a normal department at the school "for the purpose of training teachers". This designation became the first publicly funded normal school in North Carolina.

In 1905, the state assumed title to the school's buildings and property and made it a state institution. That same year, the school's name was changed to Cullowhee Normal & Industrial School. In 1925, the school's name was changed to Cullowhee State Normal School. During its years as Cullowhee Normal, the stated purpose of the school was to train teachers for the North Carolina public schools. A coeducational institution, Cullowhee Normal trained over two thousand teachers by the mid-1920s.

Over the next forty years, the school expanded its curriculum and evolved into a junior college, and in 1929 it was chartered by the Legislature as a four-year institution under the name Western Carolina Teachers College. Called "the Cullowhee experiment", Madison's idea became a model for the other regional colleges in the state.

The demand for both liberal arts and other programs led to an expansion of the school's offerings. Postgraduate studies and the Master of Arts in Education degree were added to the curriculum in 1951. In 1953, the name Western Carolina College was adopted.

In 1967, the institution was designated a regional university by the North Carolina General Assembly and given its current name, Western Carolina University. On July 1, 1972, WCU became a member of the University of North Carolina system.

One of the residence halls, Shining Rock, has been the target of several arson attacks in 2023 and 2024. The North Carolina State Bureau of Investigation entered into a joint investigation with the campus police to find the perpetrator, but the investigation stalled and the perpetrator has not been caught.

== Campuses ==
Map of North Carolina highlighting Jackson County

Western Carolina University is located in Jackson County, in the unincorporated village of Cullowhee, North Carolina. The university operates learning centers in both Asheville and Cherokee with programs offered online and at various community colleges. The main campus is located in a valley of the Tuckasegee River, between the Blue Ridge and Great Smoky Mountains, 52 miles (84 km) west of Asheville, North Carolina and 5 miles (8.0 km) south of Sylva, North Carolina. The university lies close to the Great Smoky Mountains National Park, the Blue Ridge Parkway, the Eastern Band of Cherokee Indians Reservation (officially known as the Qualla Boundary), and national forest lands. The campus is at an elevation of 2,100 feet (640 m), but is located in a thermal valley, shielding it from some of the most extreme temperatures by the surrounding mountains. Cullowhee usually has a mild winter season and can go some winters with little to no snowfall.

=== Main campus in Cullowhee ===
The main campus in Cullowhee offers twelve residence halls, two full-service cafeterias, a food court with fast-food outlets, health services, counseling, a bookstore, library, a swimming pool, tennis and basketball courts, movie theater, jogging trail and quarter-mile track, hiking and biking trails and intramural fields.

The campus center is the A.K. Hinds University Center. The UC contains the university post office, a movie theater, video and commuter lounges, student organization HQs including the Student Government Association and Last Minute Productions, meeting rooms and office spaces. Outside of the UC is the "Alumni Tower", built in 1989, on the 100th birthday of the university.

A $13.5 million 73,000-square-foot (6,800 m^{2}) Student Recreation Center, was completed over the summer of 2008. Harrill Residence Hall was renovated to add 6,000 square feet (557 m2) and bring the 1971 building to LEED standards of environmental friendliness and energy efficiency, and re-opened in fall 2012.

The new $46.2 million Health and Human Sciences Building opened for use at the start of the 2012–13 academic year, also built to LEED standards. This facility is the first project on the Millennial Initiative property and houses WCU's educational and outreach programs in the College of Health and Human Sciences. The four-story facility is home to the undergraduate and graduate programs in social work and communication sciences and disorders; graduate programs in physical therapy and health sciences; and undergraduate programs in athletic training, emergency medical care, environmental health, nutrition and dietetics, nursing and recreational therapy.

=== Asheville campus ===
WCU's educational facilities in Asheville focus on professional and graduate degrees for working students.

=== Cherokee campus ===
The Western Carolina University Cherokee Center in Cherokee, North Carolina, was established in 1975 in cooperation with the tribal government of the Eastern Band of the Cherokee Indians. The center serves Cherokee and the surrounding communities and is available to all of the people of the region. Their services include the application process, transcript request, scholarships, internships placement, high school recruitment.

== Organization and administration ==
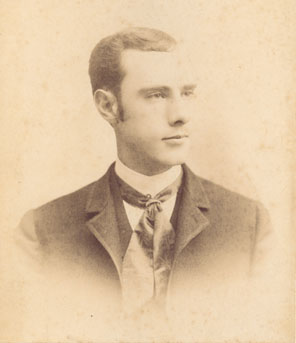
Robert Lee Madison, founder and first president

The university is led by Chancellor Kelli R. Brown, the chief administrative officer, along with Interim Provost and Vice Chancellor for Academic Affairs Richard Starnes and several advisory groups. The institution operates under the guidance and policies of the Board of Trustees of Western Carolina University. WCU also falls under the administration of University of North Carolina system president Thomas W. Ross. The university moved to a provost and senior vice chancellor model in 2004.

Presidents

- 1889–1912 Robert Lee Madison
- 1912–1920 Alonzo Carlton Reynolds
- 1920–1923 Robert Lee Madison
- 1923–1947 Hiram Tyram Hunter
- 1947–1949 William Ernest Bird
- 1949–1956 Paul Apperson Reid
- 1956–1957 William Ernest Bird
- 1957–1968 Paul Apperson Reid
- 1968–1972 Alexander Simpson Pow
- 1972 Frank Hamilton Brown, Jr. (Acting)

Chancellors

- 1972–1973 Jack Kenneth Carlton
- 1973–1973 William Hugh McEniry (Acting)
- 1974–1974 Frank Hamilton Brown, Jr. (Acting)
- 1974–1984 H.F. Robinson
- 1984–1994 Myron L. Coulter
- 1994–1995 John H. Wakeley (Interim)
- 1995–2011 John W. Bardo
- 2011–2017 David Orr Belcher
- 2018–2019 Alison Morrison-Shetlar (Acting)
- 2019–Present Kelli R. Brown

Provosts

- 2004–2010 Kyle R. Carter
- 2010–2011 Linda Stanford (Interim)
- 2011–2012 Beth Tyson-Lofquist (Interim)
- 2012–2013 Angela Laird Brenton;
- 2013–2014 Beth Tyson-Lofquist (Interim)
- 2014–2017 Alison Morrison-Shetlar
- 2018–2019 Carol Burton (Acting)
- 2019 Alison Morrison-Shetlar
- 2019–Present Richard Starnes

=== University media ===
The university produces the following publications and broadcasts:

- Western Carolina Magazine: A seasonal publication primarily for alumni and friends of WCU, Western Carolina Magazine contains features on university people and programs, alumni updates, and news and events.
- Inside WCU: A weekly electronic newsletter for the faculty and staff of WCU, The Reporter features news, events and campus community updates.
- MountainRise: An open, peer-reviewed, international electronic journal published twice a year by the Coulter Faculty Center for Excellence in Teaching & Learning at Western Carolina University for the purpose of being an international vehicle for the Scholarship of Teaching & Learning (SoTL).

WCU students, faculty and staff also contribute to:

- WCU on iTunes U Faculty and students are podcasting using WCU on iTunes U service from Apple Inc. This media repository was publicly listed on the iTunes U Colleges and Universities listings in August 2009.

== Rankings ==
Academic rankings

National
- U.S. News & World Report: 231 (tie)
- Washington Monthly: 131

== Academics and research ==
=== Academic structure ===
Western Carolina University's academic programs are housed in six colleges: Arts and Sciences, Business, Education and Allied Professions, David Orr Belcher College of Fine and Performing Arts, Health and Human Sciences, and Engineering and Technology.

In addition, Western Carolina University's Brinson Honors College coordinates courses and events in every area of student and offers several interdisciplinary program, the Graduate School coordinates the admission process, funding support, and awarding of degrees to graduate students, and Hunter Library provides academic support for all academic units.

=== Academic programs ===
With its main campus located on the site of an ancient Cherokee Indian village and adjacent to the Great Smoky and Blue Ridge Mountains, Western Carolina has a commitment to the rich traditions of both the Appalachian and Cherokee cultures. The university's Mountain Heritage Center; Cherokee Center; Craft Revival Project; Cherokee Studies Program and WCU's partnership to preserve the Cherokee language all reflect that influence – and provide educational resources for the region.

Western is classified among "M1: Master's Colleges and Universities – Larger programs" and in the elective "community engagement" category. WCU is accredited by the Commission on Colleges of the Southern Association of Colleges and Schools to award degrees at the bachelor, masters, intermediate, and doctoral levels. The university holds 21 program accreditations and is a member of more than 30 state and national associations and organizations to which its professional programs are related. In 2009, the Corporation for National and Community Service recognized WCU by awarding the President's Higher Education Community Service Honor Roll with Distinction for "exemplary commitment to service and civic engagement" on WCU's campus and beyond.

As the sixth-largest producer of teachers in North Carolina, the College of Education and Allied Professions was the national winner of the Association of Teacher Educators' Distinguished Program in Teacher Education Award in 2006. The college is also the 2007 co-winner of the Christa McAuliffe Excellence in Teacher Education Award presented by the American Association of State Colleges and Universities. The Christa McAuliffe Award nationally recognizes outstanding programs in teacher education at AASCU member institutions.

Western Carolina's Forensic Research Facility (commonly referred to as the "FoREST") is the second facility of its kind nationally. The decomposition research station is a valuable resource for researchers and forensic anthropology students to study natural decomposition.

Western Carolina University's Brinson Honors College provides an academic community in which high-achieving students challenge themselves to meet and exceed their own academic goals. WCU's Honors College was the first residential honors college in the University of North Carolina System, beginning in 1997 with only 77 students in Reynolds Hall. It now has more than 1,300 students and residential space in Balsam and Blue Ridge residence halls. The Honors College was later renamed to the Brinson Honors College in September 2020 to honor Jack and Judy Brinson. The Brinson Honors College is one of a few in the state to offer a residential option and among a few nationwide to award graduates with a special honors diploma. Entering freshman, must meet one of the following criteria to be considered for consideration into the Brinson Honors College: weighted GPA of 4.2 minimum, unweighted GPA of 3.8 minimum, class rank of 10%, ACT score of 30 minimum, or SAT score of 1370. To graduate from the Brinson Honors College, students must have a cumulative WCU GPA of at least 3.5 and they must have completed 27 credit hours with honors designation or 24 credit hours with honors designation and completion of DegreePlus Level 3. Students who graduate from the Brinson Honors College receive the specially designed Brinson Honors College diploma, the Honors medallion, and walk at the head of their class. The college is a member of the National Collegiate Honors Council. In August 2009, Balsam Hall, the first part of a $50.2 million Honors College residential community located at the center of campus opened, housing 426 students. In Fall 2010, Blue Ridge Hall completed the community and add an additional 400 beds for Honors College students and Teaching Fellows.

In the spring of 2000, WCU was officially designated a National Merit sponsoring university, just the fourth institution of higher education in North Carolina, public or private, to receive that distinction The university grants scholarships to students who qualify as National Merit Finalists. The Western Meritorious Award for Finalists provides a four-year scholarship, which covers the equivalent amount of in-state tuition, fees, room, and board, to National Merit Finalists, who also receive a computer.

The 2012 edition of the U.S. News & World Report guide to "America's Best Colleges" ranks Western Carolina University 14th among public universities in the South that offer master's degrees.

In 2015, the North Carolina General Assembly approved the NC Promise Tuition Plan, a tuition reduction plan to make three universities - WCU, Elizabeth City State University, and University of North Carolina at Pembroke - more affordable and accessible. The NC Promise began in the fall semester of 2018 and drastically reduces the tuition cost for students. In-state students pay $500 a semester and out-of-state students pay $2,500 a semester. Attendance has increased for three consecutive years with the total attendance as of Fall 2020 at 12,243 students, being the ninth time in the past ten years record enrollment has been recorded.

=== Centers, institutes, and affiliates ===
Community focus, economic development, scholarly research, business development, preservation of the Cherokee & Appalachian Mountain cultures, and the advancement of technology & public policy are the guiding foci of Western Carolina's Centers, Institutes & Affiliates.

== Student life ==
Undergraduate demographics as of Fall 2023
Race and ethnicity	Total
White	76%
Hispanic	9%
Black	7%
Two or more races	4%
International student	2%
American Indian/Alaska Native	1%
Asian	1%
Unknown	1%
Economic diversity
Income-based Pell Grant recipients	34%

=== Residential life ===
The main campus at Cullowhee has residential facilities for students. These include seventeen residence halls, two full-service cafeterias, and one food court with fast-food outlets. The halls house more than 4,500 WCU students each academic year. The campus residence buildings include one with a priority given to graduate students, named Madison Hall. Balsam Hall and Blue Ridge Hall are residence halls for Brinson Honors College students. These halls are centrally located to campus and are connected via an arch between them. The Village, home to residential Greek and student organizations. Three new residence facilities were recently completed from a $50.2 million residence hall project. The newest residence halls are referred to as "The Rocks". They consist of three buildings, Black Rock, Shining Rock, and Water Rock. They were all fully opened in Spring of 2023 and are located in place of former Scott and Walker Halls.

=== Athletics ===
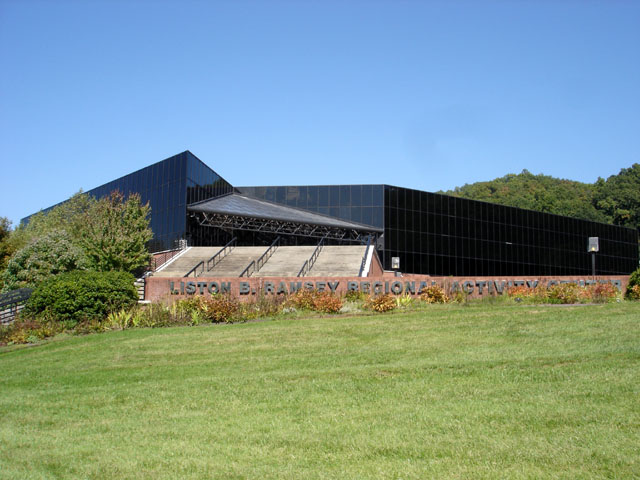
Liston B. Ramsey Regional Activity Center

As a member of the Southern Conference, Western Carolina University participates in NCAA Division I athletics. Intercollegiate athletics include football, men and women's basketball, baseball, softball, women's soccer, men and women's golf, men and women's track and field (Indoor and Outdoor), cross country running, women's volleyball and tennis. Catamount football is a member of Division I FCS and plays at Whitmire Stadium. The Ramsey Center is home to men's and women's basketball, and women's volleyball. Baseball is played at Hennon Stadium, softball is played at the Catamount Softball Complex, and the Catamount Athletic Complex is home to women's soccer, tennis, and track and field.

On November 29, 1980, Western Carolina's Ronnie Carr made the first intercollegiate three-point field goal, in a game against Middle Tennessee State University, a game WCU won 77–70. The ball he used is on display at the Basketball Hall of Fame in Springfield, Massachusetts.

Western Carolina and Appalachian State have a football rivalry in which they once competed in the Battle for the Old Mountain Jug on an annual basis. Western Carolina and East Tennessee State have a football rivalry in which they compete in the Blue Ridge Border Battle. The Catamounts football team was runner-up in the Division I-AA National Football Championship Game in 1983.

Current NCAA sports at WCU include:

- Men - Baseball, Basketball, Cross Country, Football, Golf, Track and Field
- Women - Basketball, Cross Country, Golf, Soccer, Softball, Tennis, Track and Field, Volleyball

In 2016 the WCU dance team won third place at the NDA Nationals dance competition, performing in Daytona Beach, Florida.

=== Music ===
==== Concerts and recitals ====
The Schools of Music and Fine and Performing Arts offer a variety of events featuring students, faculty, and outside performers. These cultural opportunities are typically relatively cheap, and students can often attend them free of charge.

==== Pride of the Mountains ====
The Pride of the Mountains is the largest college marching band in the Carolinas and Tennessee. As of Fall 2025, the marching band includes about 450 members, making it one of the largest marching bands in the United States. The band is open to all Western Carolina students regardless of class or major, with approximately 60% of its members non-music majors.

In 2014 and 2019, the band performed in the Macy's Thanksgiving Day Parade. The Pride of the Mountains also performed at a Carolina Panthers halftime show in 2011. The band was also the special guest at the Bands of America Grand National Championships in Indianapolis in 1998, 2003, 2008, 2012, 2015, and 2022, an honor given to only one college band in the United States each year. In addition, the band was also a special guest at the Bands of America Regional Championships held in Atlanta in 1995, 2006, 2010, and 2011, as well as in St. Louis in 2018 and 2024. In 2009, the Pride of the Mountains was selected as one of the five best collegiate marching bands in the nation by the College Band Directors National Association and featured in the book "Marching Bands and Drumlines: Secrets of Success from the Best of the Best" by Paul Buyer.

The band is the 2009 recipient of the Sudler Trophy awarded by the John Philip Sousa Foundation. They participated in the 2011 Tournament of Roses Parade in Pasadena, California, and won the most votes in a "best band" in the parade poll hosted by KTLA-TV.

=== Greek life ===
WCU is home to a wide range of Greek fraternities and sororities, as well as several councils and societies. The Greek community offers many social opportunities to enrich college life. Greeks get personal guidance in planning their curriculum and choosing classes and instructors, and assistance with registration and financial aid. Chapter study sessions, educational programs, tutoring, and study partners and teams offer support for developing and maintaining study skills. Greeks are recognized for their academic successes through Greek scholarship and awards programs and honor societies such as the Order of Omega. According to 2011–12 figures from U.S. News & World Report, 3.4% of WCU's male undergraduate students are in fraternities, while 3.6% of female undergraduate students are in sororities.

=== WCU student media ===
Housed in the Student Media Center (Old Student Union) on the hill area of campus are WCU's Student Media Organizations. The following organizations are a part of WCU Student Media:

- WWCU-FM: Power 90.5 broadcasts 24 hours a day, 7 days a week as Jackson County's only FM radio station.
- WCAT: Cable & Internet radio station broadcasting on the campus closed-circuit television station 22.
- TV 62: The student-run campus television station, offering original programing to the campus on channel 62. It is WCU's closed-circuit television station with offices located in the A.K. Hinds University Center, an organization offering original programming that allows students to showcase their short films, as well as announce events on campus and highlight recent sporting events.
- The Nomad: WCU's Literature & Art magazine, published once a year in the Spring semester.
- The Gadfly: WCU's Journal of Social Criticism and Philosophy. Satirical pieces philosophically critiquing society-at-large in a humorous manner. Published once a semester.
- Western Carolinian Newspaper: A bi-weekly newspaper focusing on news and events relevant to the campus and surrounding community. Available in print in the local area and on-line at www.westerncarolinian.com.
- The Western Carolina Journalist: An online newspaper ran by the Communication department covering news about WCU and the surrounding areas
- The Tuckasegee Valley Historical Review: An annually published graduate history journal with a primarily local focus.

== Notable people ==
=== Alumni ===
- Gerald Austin – NFL referee
- Bobbi Baker – actress, best known for her role as Kiki on the Tyler Perry sitcom House of Payne
- James A. Beaty, Jr. – current U.S. District Judge and former nominee to the U.S. Court of Appeals for the Fourth Circuit
- Dean Biasucci – athlete (former placekicker, NFL Indianapolis Colts), actor
- Gregory Bovino – American law enforcement officer who has served as a senior official in the United States Border Patrol since 2019
- Linda L. Bray – first female in the military to lead troops into combat
- Sean Bridgers – actor, writer, director, producer
- Andrew C. Brock – North Carolina State Senator
- Jared Burton – retired MLB pitcher
- Brian C. Clark - physiologist
- Keion Crossen - cornerback, Miami Dolphins
- Geoff Collins - former head football coach at Georgia Tech
- Louis Cooper – NFL linebacker
- Jeanelle Coulter Moore – First Lady of North Carolina
- Ariana DeBose – Academy Award Winning actress, singer, and dancer
- Ryan Dorsey - actor
- Louis Ducruet- scout at AS Monaco FC, 12th in line to the Monégesque throne, grandson to Rainier III, Prince of Monaco and American actress Grace Kelly
- Carol Fowler Durham – professor of Nursing at University of North Carolina at Chapel Hill, interprofessional teams expert
- Joe Firstman – musician and musical director
- Ernest A. Fitzgerald (1947) – bishop of the United Methodist Church
- Judy Green – head volleyball coach for the University of Alabama
- Mel Gibson – former basketball player for the Los Angeles Lakers
- Rich Hall – comedian, writer
- Greg Holland – MLB pitcher and MLB All-Star
- Brad Hoover – former fullback for the NFL Carolina Panthers
- Frank Huguelet – retired professional wrestler (as "'Heavy Metal' Ric Savage'"), television host
- Sarah Hutchings – Composer
- Paul Johnson – former head football coach at Georgia Tech
- Jeanne Jolly – singer, songwriter
- Tony Jones – football player with the Cleveland Browns, Baltimore Ravens, and Denver Broncos
- Andrew Jordan – tight end in the NFL
- David Joy – author
- Lisa M. Koonin – public health official
- Keith LeClair – athlete and baseball coach at Western Carolina University
- Henry Logan – athlete; in 1964 became North Carolina's first African-American to play basketball for a "white" public institution
- Kevin Martin – professional basketball player
- Manteo Mitchell – track and field athlete, 2012 London Olympic medalist
- Nick McNeil – former NFL player, WWE professional wrestler (as '"Showtime!' Percy Watson")
- Mary Cordell Nesbitt – politician
- David Patten – NFL wide receiver
- Dave Pember – former pitcher for MLB Milwaukee Brewers
- J. T. Poston - professional golfer
- Rachel Reilly – reality television show contestant, television host
- David Sedaris – humorist, comedian, author, and radio contributor
- Geno Segers – former professional rugby player, actor.
- Clyde Simmons – defensive end for the NFL Philadelphia Eagles
- Tim Sinicki – head baseball coach at intercollegiate Binghamton
- Drew Starkey - actor
- Matt Stillwell – Nashville recording artist
- Wayne Tolleson – Major League Baseball player 1981-1990
- Hedy West – American folk singer
- Willie Williams – NFL defensive back for Pittsburgh Steelers and Seattle Seahawks
- Zebby Matthews - American professional baseball pitcher for the Minnesota Twins

=== Faculty ===
- Cordelia Camp – writer and educator
- Robert J. Conley – award-winning author
- Hal Herzog – anthrozoologist
- Terrence Mann – stage actor, director, singer, songwriter, and dancer
- Ron Rash – award-winning author
- Matt Rhule - head coach, Nebraska Cornhuskers
- Laura Wright – founder of academic field of vegan studies
