= Miina Härma =

Estonian composer

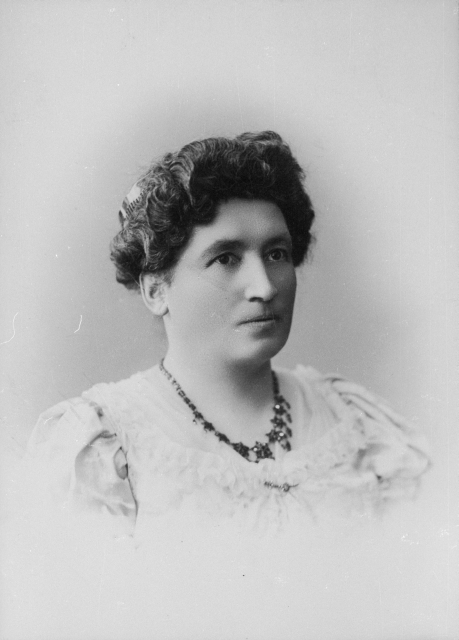
- Born: Miina Hermann; 9 February 1864; Kõrveküla, Kreis Dorpat, Governorate of Livonia, Russian Empire
- Died: 16 November 1941 (aged 77); Tartu, then part of Generalbezirk Estland, Reichskommissariat Ostland
- Education: Saint Petersburg Conservatory
- Occupations: Composer; organist; choir director; music teacher

Miina Härma (née Hermann; 9 February 1864 – 16 November 1941) was an Estonian composer, organist, choir director, and music teacher, known for being Estonia's first professional female composer and organist.

== Early life and education ==
Miina Hermann was born on 9 February [O.S. 28 January] 1864 at the schoolhouse of Kõrveküla village school in Kõrveküla, Governorate of Livonia (present-day Estonia). Härma's father was a schoolteacher. Härma was one of seven children. Both of Härma's parents were musically educated.

Härma first attended Raadi parish school before studying at K. Schultz's German girls' school. Härma first learnt music at home. Between the ages of 14–16, Härma began studying piano and music theory under with Karl August Hermann. From 1883–1890, Härma studied the organ under Louis Homilius and counterpoint and fugue under Julius Johannsen at the Saint Petersburg Conservatory.

== Career ==
From 1890–1894, Härma worked in St. Petersburg as a piano teacher and as the director of the Estonian Education Society Choir. In the winter of 1891–1882 Härma lived in Germany, primarily in Leipzig. Returning to St. Petersburg, Härma founded and directed the Estonian Children's Choir.

In 1894, the fifth Estonian Song Festival took place, which led to the formation of Härma's own choir.

Around 1903-1904, Härma moved to Kronstadt, Governorate of Saint Petersburg (present-day Russia). Härma lead the Estonian congregation's choir, and was active in the Estonian Society and Estonian women's organisations.

In 1915, Härma returned to Estonia and settled in Tartu. From 1917–1929, Härma was music teacher at Estonian Youth Education Society girls' gymnasium (present-day Miina Härma Gymnasium).

Härma was a co-founder and leader of the Tartu Music Society.

During her 60-year creative career, she wrote more than 200 choral songs, 10 cavatinas, a canto, "Kalev and Linda" and much more. She composed mainly vocal music.

=== Honours ===
In 1924, Härma became an honorary member of the Estonian Women's Students' Society for her contributions to both music and social causes. In 1939, Härma was awarded an honorary doctorate by the University of Tartu.

== Personal life ==
In 1935, Härma changed her surname from Hermann to Härma.

On 16 November 1941 Härma died aged 77 in Tartu, Reichskommissariat Ostland (present-day Estonia). Härma is buried at the Raadi Cemetery.

== Legacy ==
Her greatest contribution is perhaps the fact that she took organ music to the countryside, as virtually no skilled organists gave concerts outside of towns.

During Estonia SSR the Miina Härma collective farm in Tartu district was named after Härma.

In 1965, the Miina Härma memorial monument by Aleksander Eller was erected on Härma's grave. The memorial monument was declared an Estonian cultural heritage monument in 1997.

In 1979, Miina Härma Street in Lasnamäe, Laagna, Tallinn was named after Härma.

In 1984, the Miina Härma monument by Juta Eskel was erated outside of Miina Härma Gymnasium in honour of Härma's 120th anniversary.

In June 2014, the Bank of Estonia issued a commemorative coin dedicated to the work of Härma on her 150th anniversary.

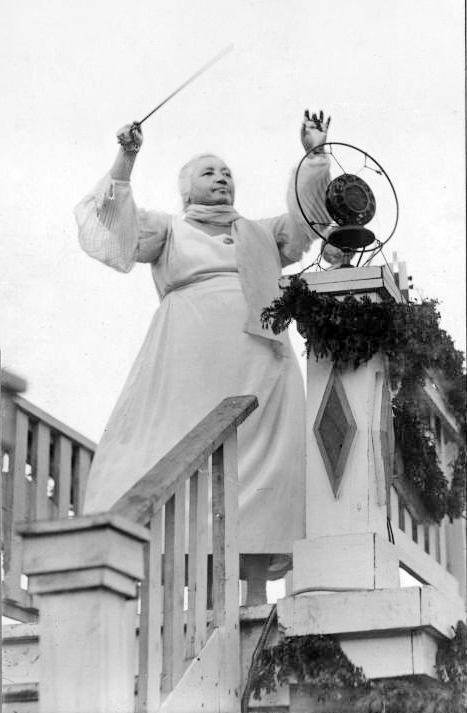
Miina Härma conducting at the IX Estonian Song Festival in Tallinn in 1928

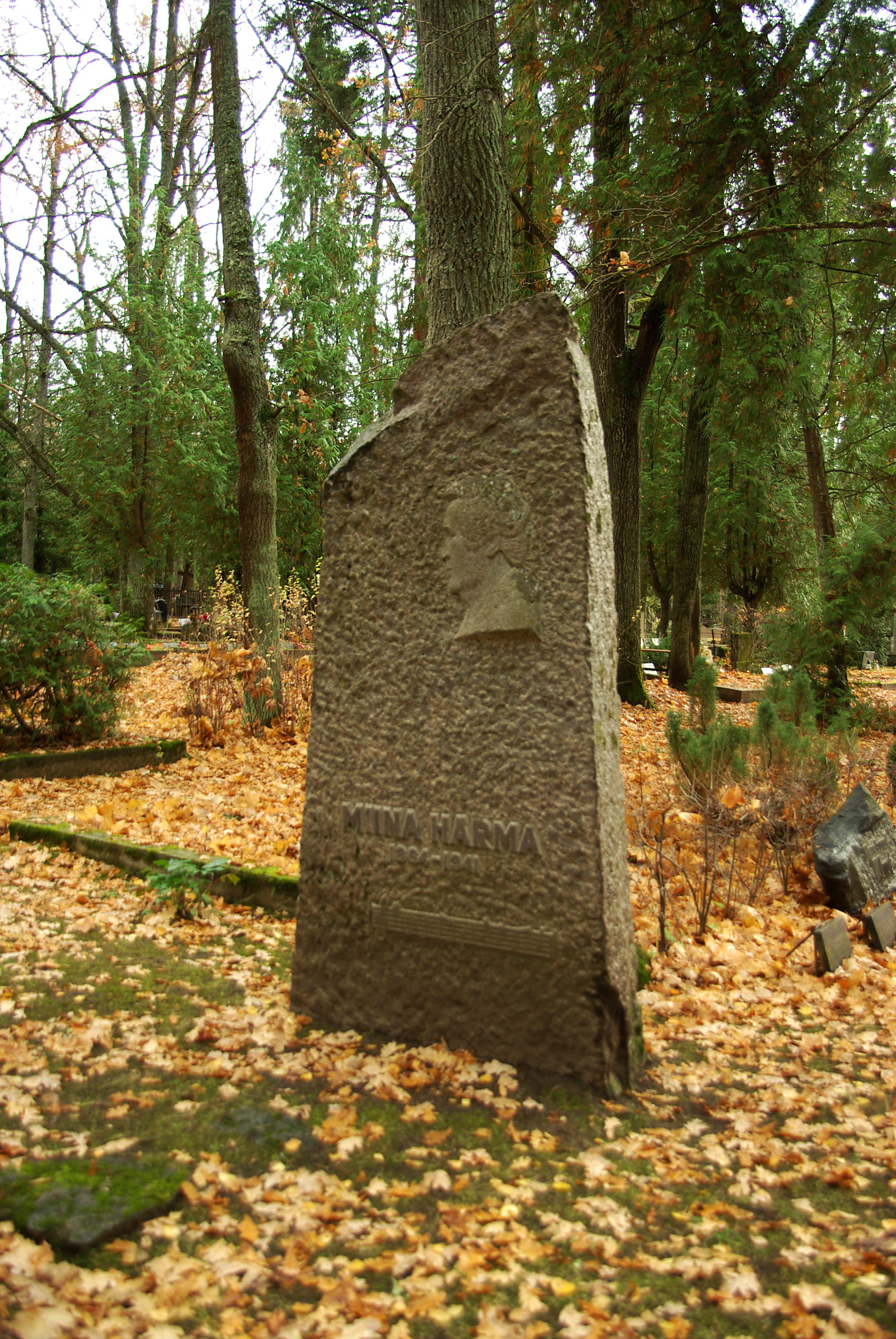
Miina Härma memorial monument

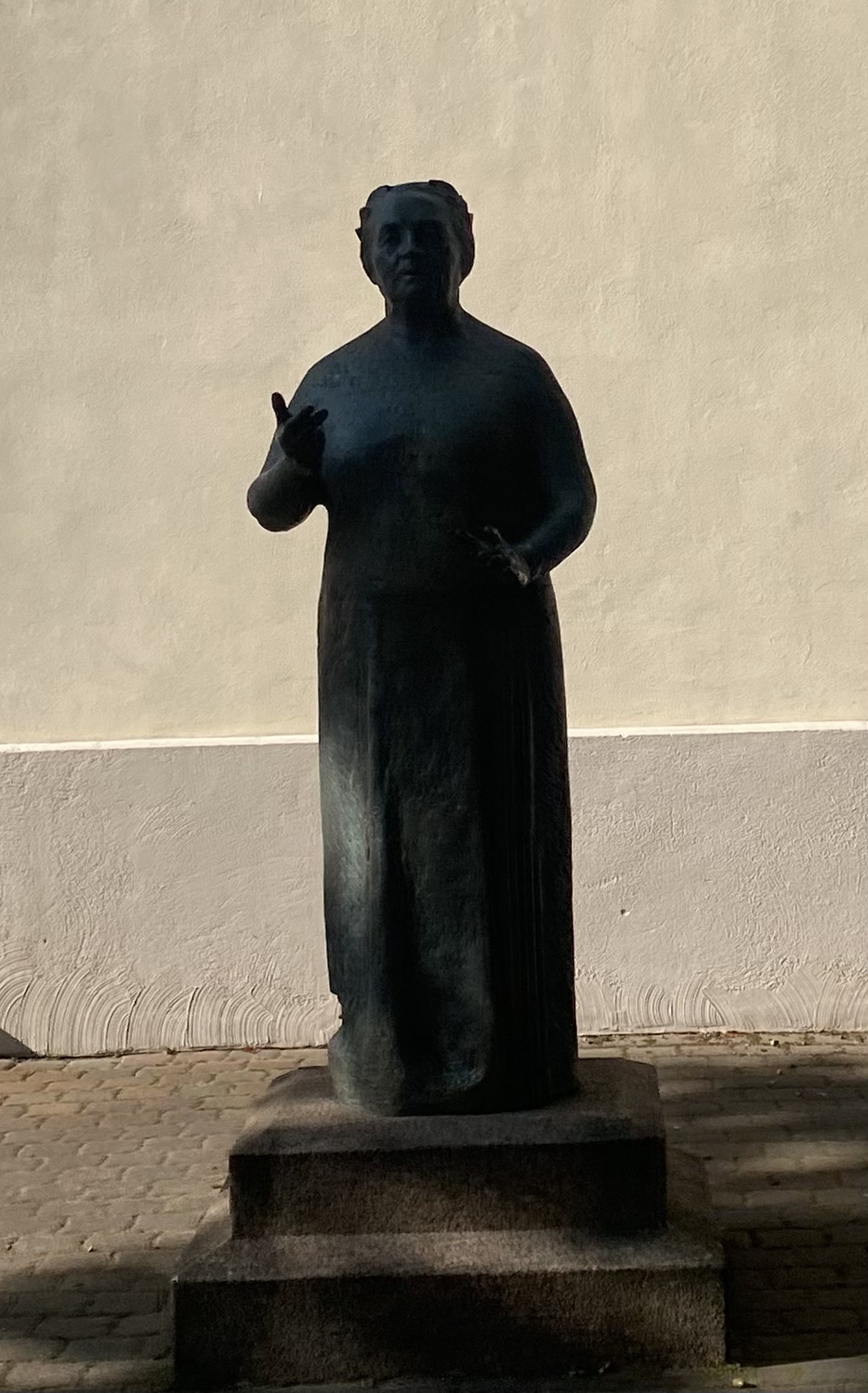
Miina Härma monument at Miina Härma Gymnasium
