= Lisa (surname) =

Lisa is a surname. Notable people with the surname include:

- Esteban Lisa, Argentine painter
- Luba Lisa, Broadway stage actress
- Manuel Lisa (1772–1820), Spanish fur trader, explorer and United States Indian agent

== See also ==
- Lisa (given name)
- Lisa (disambiguation)
