= Margarita Voites =

Estonian opera singer (1937–2024)

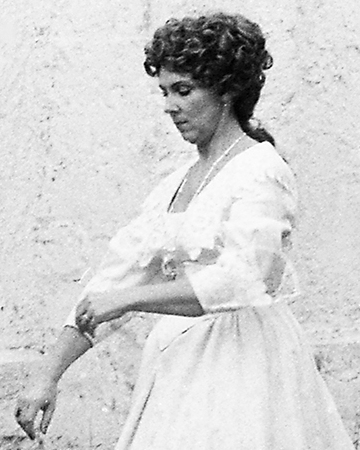
- Voites in 1980
- Born: Margarita Lombak; 30 October 1936; Moscow, USSR
- Died: 20 June 2024 (aged 87)
- Education: Tallinn Conservatory
- Occupation: Operatic soprano
- Organizations: Vanemuine theatre; Estonia Theatre
- Awards: Order of the White Star

Margarita Voites (née Lombak, 30 October 1936 – 20 June 2024) was an Estonian coloratura soprano who appeared internationally. She was from 1969 to 1990 a leading soprano at the Estonia Theatre, regarded as the prima donna of Estonia. She portrayed tragic characters such as Donizetti's Lucia di Lammermoor as well as comic roles such as Fiorilla in Rossini's Il turco in Italia, and Donizetti's La fille du régiment. She appeared internationally in concert and received international awards.

== Life and career ==
Margarita Lombak was born in Moscow. Her father, Arthur Richard Lombak, an Estonian, was an artillery engineer and later a lecturer of Marxism-Leninism. Her mother, Tamara Lombak, was of Russian and Polish origin. The family later settled in Novosibirsk where Voites began attending school, before returning to Estonia, where she continued her studies in Viljandi and Tartu. After graduating from Tartu City Secondary School No. 2 (now, the Miina Härma Gymnasium), she enrolled at the Faculty of History and Language of Tartu State University, to study bibliography. In 1957, she appeared on the university's stage in the main role of Imre Kálmán's operetta Das Veilchen vom Montmartre. The success lead to further studies at with Linda Saul at the Tallinn Conservatory for vocal training. She graduated there in 1964.

From 1964 until 1969, she was a soloist at Vanemuine theatre, where she was cast in major roles such as the title role of Verdi's La traviata, Margarethe in Gounod's Faust and Gilda in Verdi's Rigoletto. From 1969 until 1990, Voites worked at the Estonia Theatre, as the prima donna of Estonia, singing alongside Tiit Kuusik, Ivo Kuusk, and Georg Ots, among others, and conductors such as Neeme Järvi and Eri Klas. She was known for her portrayal of Donizetti's Lucia di Lammermoor, but also appeared in comic opera such as Rossini's Il turco in Italia, and Donizetti's Don Pasquale and La fille du régiment, and Mozart's Der Schauspieldirektor. She also appeared in operetta, such as Die Fledermaus by J. Strauss, and in musicals, such as Linnupuur in 1999 in Tallinn's Linnahall. She performed as a soloist in vocal symphonic works such as Erkki-Sven Tüür's Ante finem saeculi.

She performed concerts in all Soviet republics, in Czechoslovakia, Romania, Bulgaria, Germany, Hungary, Finland, Italy, Malta, Sweden, Switzerland, Canada, Japan, India and Sri Lanka. She made many recordings, including for Estonian Radio.

Voites was a member of the Estonian Theatre Union from 1966, and an honorary member of the Estonian Actors' Union from 2008. After she retired from the stage, she kept working as a singer.

Voites died on 20 June 2024, at the age of 87.

== Awards ==
- 1969: Meritorious Artist of the Estonian SSR
- 1979: People's Artist of the USSR.
- 1986: Georg Ots Prize
- 2011: Order of the White Star, III class.

== Opera roles ==
Operatic roles of Voites included:

- Frasquita in Bizet's Carmen, 1963, Estonia Theatre
- Violetta (title role) in Verdi's La traviata, 1964 and 1974, also in Bolshoi Theatre in 1973
- Margarethe in Gounod's Faust, 1965
- Mrs. Ford in Nicolai's Die lustigen Weiber von Windsor, 1966
- Gilda in Verdi's Rigoletto, 1966, at Estonias 1969
- Saffi in Der Zigeunerbaron by J. Strauss, 1968
- title role in Donizetti's Lucia di Lammermoor, 1970 and 1984
- Fiorilla in Rossini's Il turco in Italia, 1971
- Lauretta in Puccini's Gianni Schicchi, 1972
- Konstanze in Mozart's Die Entführung aus dem Serail, 1973
- Rosalinde in Die Fledermaus by J. Strauss, 1973
- Lucy in Menotti's The Telephone, 1973
- Norina in Donizetti's Don Pasquale, 1974
- Roxane in Tamberg's Cyrano de Bergerac, 1976
- Musette in Puccini's La bohème, 1977
- Marie in Donizetti's La fille du régiment, 1979
- Frau Herz in Mozart's Der Schauspieldirektor, 1981
- la Tangolita in Abraham's Ball im Savoy, 1982
- title role in Handel's Alcina, 1985
- Olympia in Offenbach's The Tales of Hoffmann, 1988
- Xenia in Mussorgsky's Boris Godunov, 1988 Paris Opera
