= Helmi Mäelo =

Estonian writer (1898–1978)

- Born: Helmi Pett; 13 April 1898; Uderna Parish, Tartu County, Estonia
- Died: 17 July 1978 (aged 80); Stockholm, Sweden
- Other names: Helmi Mühlberg
- Occupations: writer, activist

Helmi Mäelo (born Helmi Pett, also known as Helmi Mühlberg; 13 April 1898 – 17 July 1978) was an Estonian writer and social figure, the initiator of Mother's Day celebrations in Estonia.

== Early life and education ==
Mäelo was born Helmi Pett on 13 April 1898 in Uderna Parish (now part of Elva Parish), Tartu County. Her brother was the soldier and musician Kristjan Pett (1915–2016). She was educated at the Uderna Ministry School and the Girls' High School of the Estonian Youth Education Society in Tartu, which she graduated from in 1919. From 1920 to 1923, she studied at the University of Tartu's Faculty of Law, but when she was elected the secretary of the newly founded Estonian Women's Temperance Union in 1923 she left the university. She was a member of the female student society ENÜS Ilmatari and the Estonian Society of Women Students.

== Career ==
In 1924–1940 Mäelo was a General Secretary of the Temperance Union. From 1923 to 1924, she was the editor-in-chief of the magazine Naiste Töö ja Elu. Mäelo and Helmi Põld were the founders of Eesti Naine (Estonian Woman) magazine, and Mäelo became its first editor-in-chief (1924-1940). In 1933–1937, she was the editor of Väikeste Sõber, a supplementary publication of Eesti Naine. From 1937 to 1940, Mäelo was a head of the association of Estonians abroad Välis-Eesti Ühingu.

Since 1923 on Mäelo's initiative, Mother's Day, started to be celebrated in Estonia. On 14 February 1934, the Tartu city council named Maarjamõisa street Julius Kuperjanov street at her suggestion. Mäelo was also later a member of the Tartu City Council.

In 1944 Mäelo fled to Germany and later in 1945 she moved to Sweden. There she was the secretary of the Baltic Humanist Association from 1960 to 1975.

Helmi Mäelo belonged to the Estonian Writers' Union, the Estonian PEN Club, and the Swedish Writers' Association. She was an honorary member of the Estonian Committee and the Finnish Women's Temperance Association. Member of the Chamber of Home Economics.

Helmi Mäelo died on 17 July 1978 in Stockholm, aged 80. She is buried in Stockholm Skogskyrkogården cemetery.

== Works ==
Mäelo wrote a total of 13 novels. Her main work is the pentalogy Oma veri (Own Vlood) (1965). She has also published juvenile and popular science books, as well as pamphlets on abstinence and education.

Helmi Mäelo has left a deep mark on Estonian memoirs. In 1959, Part I of her autobiography was published in exile under the title Farmer's Daughter. The book tells about Mäelo's childhood before the time of the Republic of Estonia. Among other things, there are pictures of Uderna school and student life in Tartu.

The next published work is Elugetevuses (1961). It contains memories of youth and active abstinence and public education work during the years of the Republic of Estonia. In the work Võõrsil (1974) Mäelo describes the escape to Sweden and the first years of exile. The title of the next part was Sammud edasi, published in 1975 in Lund. In the book, Helmi Mäelo presents his activities as a refugee in Sweden. The period is also reflected in Eesti naine läbi aegade (Estonian woman through the ages).

Helmi Mäelo's most influential popular science work Eesti naine läbi aegade was published in Lund in 1957 (republished in Estonia in 1999). The book contains the most complete overview of Estonian women's history to date, proposing a periodization of women's history and presenting biographical data and brief introductions of many well-known women.

== Personal life ==
Helmi Mäelo married Bernhard Mühlberg on 29 September 1923. The original surname Mühlberg was Estonianized to Mäelo in 1924. At the time of the marriage, Bernhard's request to Estonianize the surname had not yet been granted. The couple had a daughter Marja Jaanivald, and sons Olev Mäelo and Meemo Mäelo.

== Commemoration ==
On August 17, 2015, a Helmi Mäelo memorial bench was installed in Peeter Põld Square in Tartu. According to the relatives who initiated the installation of the bench, it was a symbolic reunion of student and teacher, as Mäelo studied at the school led by Peeter Põld and later portrayed the former principal in the novel Teras.
