= Lisa Linn Kanae =

Lisa Linn Kanae is an English professor at Kapiʻolani Community College and is best known for her poetry and short stories written in Hawaiian Pidgin.

== Early life and education ==
Born and raised in Kapahulu, Oʻahu, Kanae is of Hawaiian, Chinese, Japanese, and Filipino ancestry. Before returning to college after a ten-year hiatus, she worked as a secretary. Beginning at Kapiʻolani Community College, Kanae later transferred to the University of Hawaiʻi at Mānoa, where she earned her B.A. and then went on to earn her M.A. in 1999.

== Career ==
Kanae is an English professor at Kapiʻolani Community College, where she chairs the LLL (Languages, Linguistics and Literature) Department. Kanae is a recipient of the 2009 Cades Award for Literature for Emerging Writers.

Kanae was an editor for Hawaiʻi Review and an editorial assistant for ‘Ōiwi. She is best known for being a Hawaiʻi author that writes in Pidgin, but has also tried her hand at spoken-word poetry, too. She has written for Hawaiʻi journal Hybolics.

== Bibliography ==
- Kanae, Lisa Linn (1998). Ola's Son. Tin Fish Press.
- Kanae, Lisa Linn (2001). Sista tongue. Kaneohe, HI: Tinfish. ISBN 0-9712198-2-6. OCLC 48633353.
- Kanae, Lisa Linn (2009). Islands linked by ocean : stories. Honolulu, Hawaii: Bamboo Ridge Press. ISBN 978-0-910043-79-3. OCLC 303032379.
