= Lisa M. Koonin =

American public health official and medical researcher

Lisa M. Koonin is an American public health official and medical researcher associated with the development of social distancing as a strategy to prevent the spread of viral diseases.

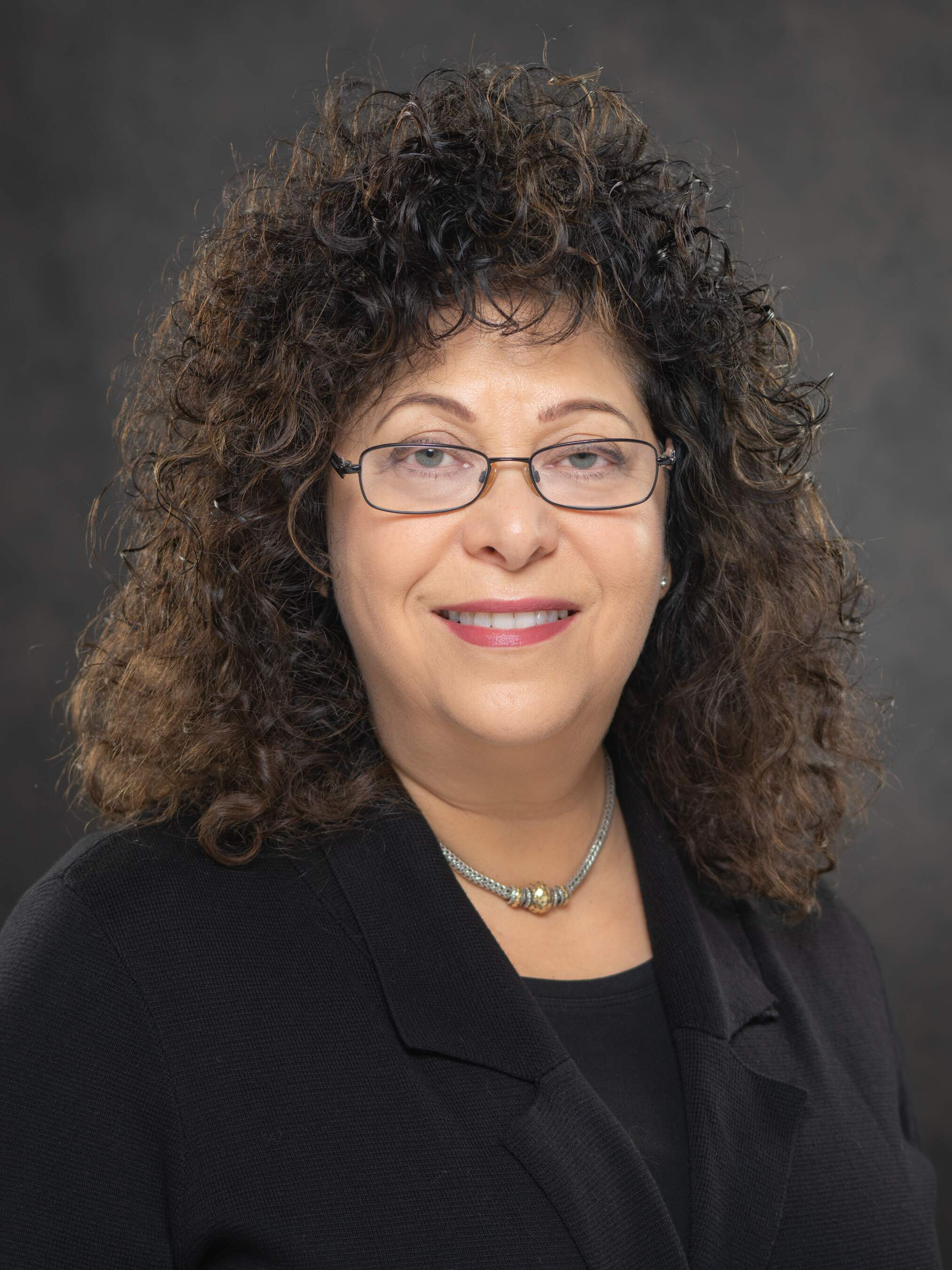
Lisa M. Koonin

Lisa Koonin worked for over 30 years in the US government's Center for Disease Control and Prevention (CDC) and was involved in planning for and managing responses to national and international viral and natural disasters. During her career at CDC, she led the development of national pandemic preparedness plans and policies, conducted large-format exercises, and consulted with businesses, state and local governments, healthcare facilities, non-governmental organizations, academic institutions, and ministries of health around the world, to improve emergency preparedness.

She is one of the public health leaders featured in Michael Lewis's book, The Premonition. This author describes how Koonin, as part of a small team, developed the national policy that informed mitigation measures taken during the COVID-19 pandemic.

Koonin founded Health Preparedness Partners (HPP) after her career with CDC. HPP helped organizations in their response to the COVID-19 pandemic, including providing practical and detailed guidance about determining when and how to return to the workplace, strategies for protecting employees and managing ongoing health risks. In her current role, Koonin provides consultation to businesses and organizations as they update their business continuity and emergency response plans for future health emergencies.

== Education ==
Koonin's degrees are in nursing (BSN, Western Carolina University, 1983; MN, Emory University, 1986), epidemiology (MPH, Emory University, 1986), and public health leadership/health policy and management (DrPH, University of North Carolina at Chapel Hill, 2013).

== Professional areas of interest ==
Koonin has published more than 100 peer-reviewed scientific publications on an array of public health and preparedness topics; her publications range from early work on maternal mortality, teen pregnancy, and reproductive health issues in the first twenty years of her career to work on influenza pandemics and emergency preparedness from 2008 on. She was awarded the 2024 annual Rosalind Franklin Society Award in Science from the journal Health Security for her paper “How Employers Impact Individual and Community Health During Public Health Emergencies: Rationale for Public Health/Private Sector Partnerships”. This award recognizes the outstanding research and published work of women and underrepresented minority scientists, physicians, and engineers.
