= Lisa Martin =

Lisa Martin may refer to:

- Lisa Martin (runner) (born 1960), Australian long-distance runner
- Lisa Martin (equestrian) (born 1972), Australian para-equestrian
- Lisa Martin (political scientist), American political scientist
- Lisa Martin (rugby union) (born 1990), Scottish rugby union player
