= Priit Pullerits =

Estonian journalist

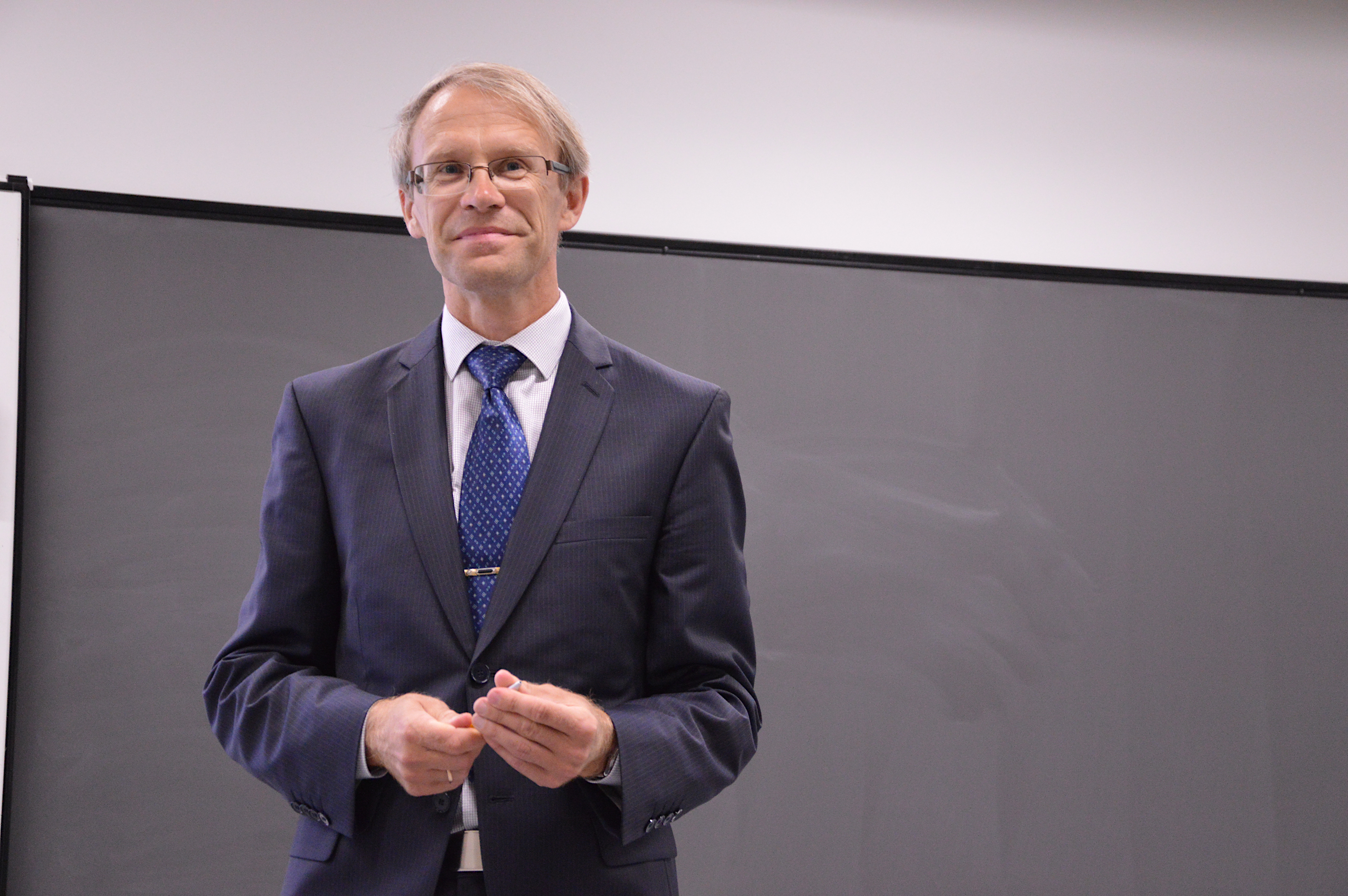
Priit Pullerits (2020)

Priit Pullerits (born July 30, 1965) is an Estonian journalist. He graduated from the University of Tartu and is now a lecturer for the university. He is also employed by the Estonian newspaper Postimees.

== Biography ==
Priit Pullerits is the son of cultural historian Heivi Pullerits and chemist Rein Pullerits, his brother is medical scientist Teet Pullerits.

He graduated from the University of Tartu in 1990 with a bachelor's degree in journalism and successfully defended a master's degree in 1995.

In 1991 he started lecturing at the University of Tartu in communications and information studies.

He founded the Estonian magazine Favoriit in 1993 and was the editor in chief for the magazine until 1998.

Since 1998 he has worked for the Estonian magazine Postimees as editor in chief.

In his free time, Priit Pullerits maintains a popular sports blog "Pulleritsu/Scanpixi spordiblogi", in Estonian, mainly about skiing and running.

== Publications ==
- USA ajakirjandus, University of Tartu Press 2003, ISBN 9985567919
- Ameerika, Ajakirjade Kirjastus 2008, ISBN 9789949443468
