= Liisa Past =

Estonian cybersecurity expert (born 1980)

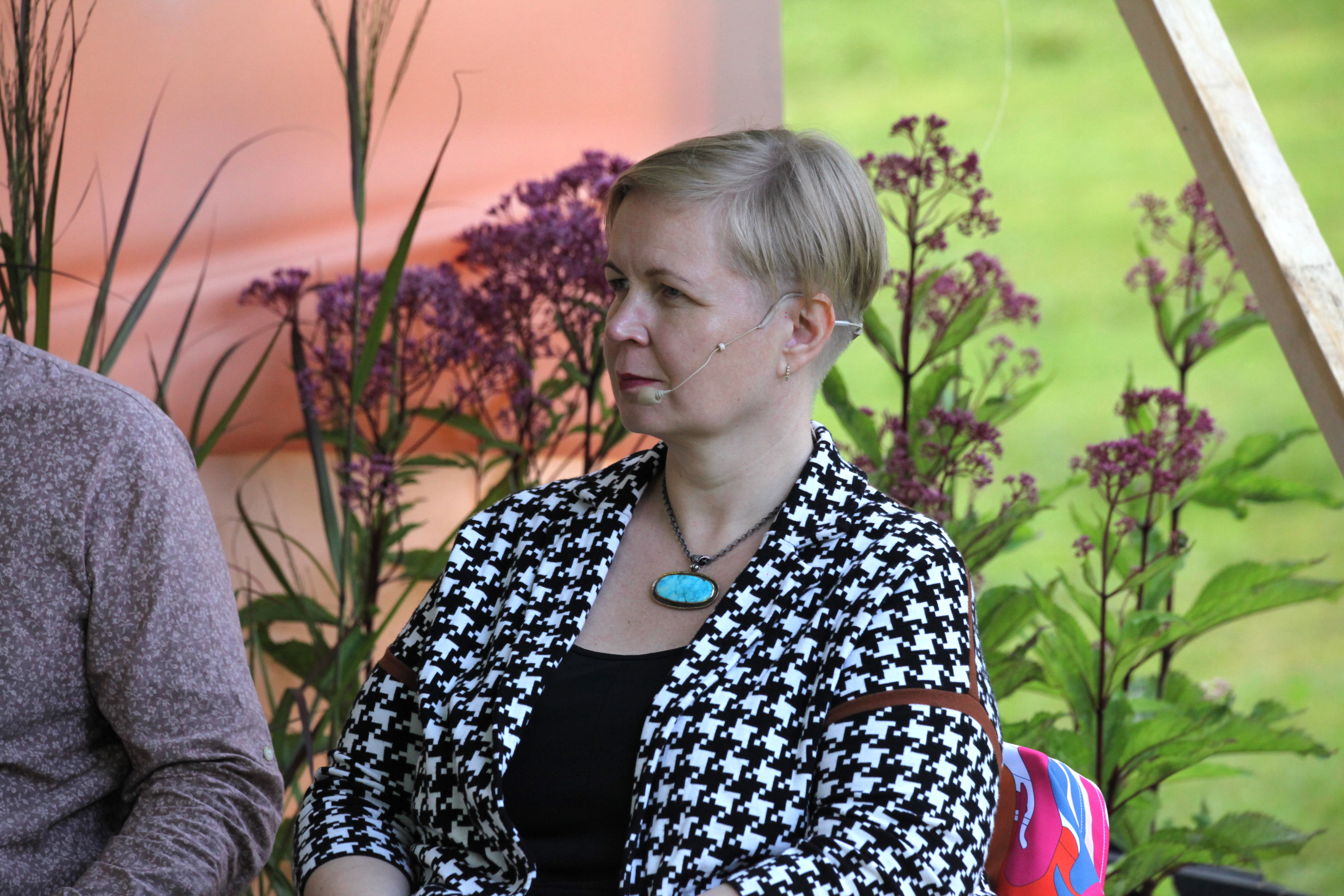
- Past at Arvamusfestival in 2021
- Born: 1 May 1980 (age 46)
- Education: University of Tartu; University of Oslo; Barnard College at Columbia University
- Occupations: Civil servant, security expert

Liisa Past (born 1 May 1980) is an Estonian civil servant, political, communication and cyber security expert.

== Education ==
Liisa Past graduated from Miina Härma Gymnasium in 1999. She received her master's degree in communication at the University of Tartu in 2012. She has also studied political science at the University of Oslo in Norway and Barnard College at Columbia University.

== Work and social activities ==
Liisa Past has worked as a journalist and communication strategist, as a leading analyst of State Information Systems, in the leadership of the Cooperative Cyber Defence Centre of Excellence, at the McCain Institute in the U.S. state of Arizona, in the State Chancellery's Security and National Defense Coordination Office. From the spring of 2021, She worked as the head of the information security department of the Information Technology and Development Center of the Estonian Ministry of the Interior (SMIT), from August 2022 as the head of the national cyber security department of the Ministry of Economic Affairs and Communications. In her activities, She is focused on the protection of human rights and democracy.
