= Murders of Lisa Fuillerat and Samara Routenberg =

2017 murder-suicide in Florida

- Date: February 24, 2017
- Location: Hillsborough County, Florida, US
- Type: Murder-suicide
- Convicted: No convictions as perpetrator killed himself in the crime scene.

On February 24, 2017, at around 6:30 a.m., Vincente Fuillerat, armed with a shotgun, murdered his wife, Lisa Fuillerat and her partner, Samara Routenberg. Fuillerat then wrote a suicide note, the contents of which remain confidential, pinned it to his vest and killed himself with his own weapon. Lisa and Vicente Fuillerat were scheduled to meet in court that same day, as they were in the process of getting divorced. Both victims were teachers at a Lake Gibson Middle School, and had been in a relationship for at least two years prior to the murder.

== Victims ==
Lisa Fuillerat
- Born: Lisa Dawn Nall; 3 September 1965; Hialeah, Florida, U.S
- Died: 24 February 2017 (aged 51); Brandon, Florida, U.S
- Cause of death: Gunshot wound
- Occupation: Sixth-grade Math teacher at Lake Gibson Middle School
- Spouse: Vincente Fuillerat (m. 1990; died 2017)
- Children: 2 (Michael and Amanda)

Samara Routenberg
- Born: Samara L. Routenberg; 27 December 1977; Harvey, Illinois, U.S
- Died: 24 February 2017 (aged 39); Brandon, Florida, U.S
- Cause of death: Gunshot wound
- Occupation: Assistant Principal at Lake Gibson Middle School

Lisa Dawn Fuillerat (née Nall; 3 September 1965 – 24 February 2017) was a math teacher. She was born in Hialeah, Florida, on September 3, 1965, to Cynthia Hailer and Johnny Nall, studied in the Hialeah High School and obtained a bachelor's degree from Florida Southern College in Lakeland, Florida. In 1990s, she met her husband, Vincent Fuillerat, with whom she had two children, Michael and Amanda. They separated in 2014 and that same year, Nall moved into the home of a colleague, Samara Routenberg, and lived there until her death. Samara L. Routenberg (27 December 1977 – 24 February 2017) was an assistant principal and testing coordinator, as well as former math teacher. She was born on December 27, 1977, in Harvey, Illinois to David and Kerri Routenberg. In 2010, she received a Magna Cum Laude master's degree at Nova University. She started to work in 2001 as a math teacher and soon after she worked in the Florida Department of Education. Later on, she got a job as assistant principal at Lake Gibson Middle School in Lakeland, Florida, where she worked until her death.

== Perpetrator ==
Vincente "Vince" P. Fuillerat (3 November 1963 – 24 February 2017) was an electronic security consultant. He was born to Vincente Fuillerat Sr. and an unknown mother. Little is known about his life except that he married Lisa Heiler in the late 1980s or early 1990s, and had two children with her, Vincent Michael and Amanda Nicole.

Vincente Fuillerat
- Born: Vincente P. Fuillerat; 3 November 1963; Florida, U.S
- Died: 24 February 2017 (aged 53); Brandon, Florida, U.S
- Cause of death: Suicide by self-inflicted gunshot
- Occupation: Electricity security consultant

== Events prior to the murder ==
In 2014, Lisa Fuillerat moved from her family home to Samara Routenberg's home located on Hickory Creek Drive in Brandon, Florida, a community close to Tampa. During that period, they began a hidden relationship, as Routenberg was Fuillerat's supervisor. Contemporarily, Fuilerat began divorce proceedings against her husband, but he declined to sign the proper documents or accept a formal divorce.

On October 2, 2015, Vincente Fuillerat entered Routenberg's home from the garage door. When Routenberg noticed his presence, she confronted him, and expelled him. Fuillerat left, but returned carrying an "unknown blunt object". He struck Routenberg's face several times, and slammed her head against the pavement.

Fuillerat was arrested and charged with aggravated battery and burglary. Because he did not have previous charges in Florida, he was sentenced to 36 months in probation and had to pay $6,040 for Routenberg's medical bills. Three days later, Routenberg signed an order of restriction.

On October 21, 2015, Lisa Fuillerat filed for a dissolution of marriage in Polk County. However, due to his opposition, the divorce process extended at least one and a half years more. During that time she and Routenberg acquired two pistols and began to practice at local shooting ranges.

== Murder ==
On February 24, 2017, at around 6:30 as seen in the Routenberg vigilance cameras, Vincent Fuillerat broke into the couple's house wearing a bulletproof vest and armed with a shotgun. Both Lisa Fuillerate and Samara Routenberg noticed the entrance of the suspect, as alarms began to ring shortly after Fuillerat entered the premises. The Fuillerats and Routenberg began shooting for an undetermined period of time. The two women managed to wound Vincente Fuillerat several times, but were ultimately killed. Vincente Fuillerat then wrote a suicide note and killed himself.

== Aftermath ==
Next day, the three corpses were discovered, and as the letter depicted, Fuillerat's motives for killing were mainly jealousy and impotence. According to Fuillerat's attorney, Ralph Fernandez, in an interview with the New York Post – "He felt the relation was immoral; He called it a lot worse than that. He said, "I can't compete with that".

Eight years later, on March 21, 2025, his son, Vincent Michael Fuillerat, would also commit a murder-suicide against an ex girlfriend. He would shot his ex-girlfriend at a movie theater in the greater Houston area.

== Media ==
The case was featured in the Investigation Discovery series, Forbidden: Dying for Love, in the third season in a chapter named "The Sum of Love", in which, Lisa Fuillerat is portrayed by Michelle D'Alessandro Hatt, and Vincente is portrayed by Scott Patrick McLaren.
