= Lisa Meness =

Former Chief of the Algonquins of Pikwàkanagàn First Nation

Lisa Meness is an Algonquin former Chief of the Algonquins of Pikwàkanagàn First Nation.

== Biography ==
Meness was a councillor of the Algonquins of Pikwàkanagàn First Nation from 1995 to 1999.

In 1999, Meness was elected as Chief Ozawanimke, serving from April 1999 until March 2003. In July 2002, she opened the National Association of Women and the Law's 14th Biennial Conference on Women, the Family and the State in Ottawa.

In 2016, Meness worked as funding research co-ordinator for the Algonquins of Pikwàkanagàn First Nation.

In 2020, Meness ran as a candidate for Chief of the Algonquins of Pikwàkanagàn First Nation, following the retirement of Kirby Whiteduck. She was beaten in the election by Wendy Jocko. Jocko appointed Meness as her Communications Specialist in January 2021. In July 2021, Meness encouraged Canadians to join the Pikwàkanagàn First Nation in a candlelight vigil and drumming ceremony called "Light Up the Lake" instead of celebrating Canada Day.
