= Tanel Joamets =

Estonian pianist

Tanel Joamets (born 14 September 1968 in Tartu) is an Estonian pianist. He graduated from the Estonian Academy of Music and Theatre in 1994. In 1998 he got a scholarship for post-graduate studies in Guildhall School of Music and Drama in London.

Tanel Joamets has given solo and chamber concerts in Estonia and Finland, but also in Canada, Australia, Germany and England. After success in Scriabin Competition in 2000 he has toured every year everywhere over Russia and Kazakhstan visiting more than 50 cities, including major centres like Moscow, Kazan, Rostov, Ufa, Yekaterinburg, Omsk, Novosibirsk, Krasnoyarsk, Habarovsk and Vladivostok. He has played piano concertos of Ravel, Grieg, Rachmaninoff, Mozart, Scriabin and Schnittke with different symphony and chamber orchestras of Estonia and Russia. In addition to different chamber projects every year in Estonia, he has played several times chamber music with musicians of Chamber Orchestra of Lapland (Lapin Kamariorkesteri) in Finland.

Tanel Joamets is working as a piano and improvisation lecturer in the Estonian Academy of Music and Theatre. He is a member of the Association of Estonian Professional Musicians and the international Eduard Tubin Society.

In 2000-2006 he was the artistic director and one of performers of Tartu International Improvisation Festival IMPROVIZZ.

== Tanel Joamets on CDs ==
- Tanel Joamets live recordings, Tartu, 2008.
- First Scriabin International Piano Competition, Vista Vera, VVCD-96010, 1996.
- Sydney International Piano Competition of Australia, ABC 4547242, 1996.
- Classic 100 – Piano Various Artists, 2005, ISBN / Catalogue Number: 4767202

== Prizes ==
- Edvard Grieg competition in Tallinn in 1993 – 2nd prize
- Estonian national competition in Tallinn in 1994 – 3rd prize
- International Alexander Scriabin Piano Competitions in Nizhny Novgorod (Russia) in 1995 – diploma
- International Alexander Scriabin Piano Competitions in Moscow in 2000 – 5th prize
- Competition of Young Culture in Düsseldorf in 1996 - a special prize as a member of improvisation ensemble Extemporisers (Ekstemporistid).
