= Leisa Goddard =

Australian television journalist

- Born: Queensland, Australia.
- Occupations: Founder and Managing Director Adoni Media, Journalist, former foreign correspondent, investigative reporter, media commentator.
- Years active: 1996 – present
- Known for: Media expert, commentator, former journalist and founder of Adoni Media. An authority on crisis communications, media training, and public relations.
- Website: https://www.adonimedia.com.au/

Leisa Goddard is an Australian media expert, journalist, and Founder of Adoni Media which specialises in media training, crisis communications, and public relations.

A former foreign and war correspondent, Goddard has more than 30 years' media experience.

Goddard worked as a news and investigative journalist for all Australian commercial TV networks – Seven Network, Nine Network Australia, and Network Ten. She spent decades reporting as a nightly news journalist in Australia and overseas including the Bali bombing trials and terror attacks in Indonesia. At Network Ten, Goddard spent three years as the United States Bureau Chief based in Los Angeles. As a war correspondent embedded with Australian troops in Afghanistan she survived Taliban attack. Her reporting under fire earned her a Logie Award nomination. She went on to work for Sunrise, Today Tonight, and A Current Affair.

Goddard, as a young journalist, made history as Australia's first commercial TV video journalist.

In 2012, Goddard founded Adoni Media to deliver PR and corporate communications through the lens of a journalist. The national agency, and Goddard, are recognised as leaders in public relations, crisis communications, reputation management, and media training.

Since 2019 Goddard has been a regular commentator on News24 (formerly Sky News Australia). She is a published opinion writer and regular commentator and panelist on radio.

Goddard was previously known as Leisa Goddard-Roles.

== Early life ==
Goddard grew up in Ipswich, Queensland, and completed Year 12 at Ipswich State High School. As a 16-year-old high school student, Goddard began her journalism career working as an intern at the local Ipswich newspaper, The Queensland Times. At 19, while in her second year of studying journalism at the University of Queensland, Goddard earned a cadetship at the Sunshine Coast Daily.

== Career ==
Goddard is a media expert with a media career that spans more than 30 years.

Goddard is best known for her years on prime-time Australian television news and current affairs programs. In 2003, she worked as Network Ten's United States bureau chief based in Los Angeles, covering global and U.S. news including disasters such as Hurricane Katrina, the second Presidential inauguration of George W. Bush, the Virginia Tech Shooting, a NASA shuttle launch, the London Bombings, and daily political and business news. During her time in America, Goddard interviewed world leaders and movie stars. She reported live from red carpets at the Academy Awards, Golden Globes, Screen Actors Guild Awards and the Grammys and secured exclusive backstage interviews with Australian singers and stars.

In 2010, Goddard spent a month embedded (with her producer and cameraman) in the Afghanistan war zone. They came under Taliban rocket attack at an Australian base in the Oruzgan Province and continued to report. Goddard and the crew had been filming an interview for the one-hour documentary, 11 Days in Afghanistan, when the rocket attack and fire fight began. Network Ten and Goddard were nominated for a Logie Award in the category of Most Outstanding News Coverage at the 2011 ceremony in recognition of their work.

In 2012, she moved to current affairs and investigative reporting, when she re-joined the Seven Network first as a breakfast television and news reporter on Sunrise and then working on Today Tonight. In 2014, Goddard joined A Current Affair, the Nine Network's nightly current affairs program. She reported on-air, presenting investigative reports and national current affairs.

In 2012, Goddard founded public relations agency Adoni Media which services clients across Australia from ASX-listed corporates, to private enterprise, charity and government agencies. As Founder and Managing Director, Goddard's understanding of the media and decades spent in newsrooms underpins a sharp, strategic mind for public relations, crisis communications, media strategy, and media training.

Goddard is recognised as a leader and expert in Media Training. She is known for having built Australia's most experienced Media Training team consisting of former journalists who worked for A Current Affair, former TV news bosses who worked in the Australian Parliamentary Press Gallery, as Ministerial Advisors, and journalists around the country.

Goddard prepares CEOs, industry leaders, politicians, sporting stars, and media spokespeople to have the skills and techniques to confidently present and manage TV, radio, print and online interviews.

Goddard developed the Media Training program and wrote the Executive Media Training Manual. She expanded the program and changed the media training landscape with the introduction of in-studio Media Training in TV studios in Sydney and Brisbane. Adoni Media and Leisa Goddard are the preferred Media Training providers for ASX-listed companies, international corporates, private enterprise, charities, politicians, and sporting stars.

In 2026 Adoni Media was ranked in the top 20 in Australia for best Media Training and PR for executives and public figures.

Adoni Media was awarded in The Australian Enterprise Awards 2026 'Most Trusted PR Agency 2026' and 'Excellence in Media Training 2026'.

Since 2019 Goddard has been a regular commentator on opinion programs across News24, formerly known as Sky News Australia.

Goddard is regularly interviewed as a media expert and contributes as a panelist on radio networks including 4BC and has opinion published in The Daily Telegraph.

== Awards ==
A United Nations Media Peace Award special commendation for Increasing Awareness and Understanding of Children's Rights and Issues (2004) with a special investigation into youth homelessness for Network Ten.

In 2011, Goddard was nominated for a Logie award for reporting while under fire as a war correspondent in the Afghanistan war.

Adoni Media's Your Health Your Choice campaign won the Judges Choice Award at the 18th Annual Complementary Medicines Australia in 2017, and was nominated for Best Government Relations Campaign award at Mumbrella CommsCon Awards in 2018.
