= Lisa (magazine) =

German women's magazine

- Categories: Women's magazine
- Frequency: Weekly
- First issue: 1994
- Company: Hubert Burda Media
- Country: Germany
- Based in: Offenburg
- Language: German
- Website: www.lisa.de

Lisa is a German weekly women's magazine. As of 2025, the magazine's circulation is above 100,000.

== History ==
It was first published in 1994.

Lisa provided articles on women's, food, entertainment and is published on a weekly basis.
