= Lisa Bayliss-Pratt =

Nursing educationalist

- Born: October 1976
- Alma mater: University of Wolverhampton
- Occupation: Professor, nurse, researcher
- Employer: Coventry University (2019–); Health Education England (–2019)

Lisa Bayliss-Pratt is a British nurse who now directs and leads medical education for nurses and ancillary staff in England. She was appointed the Chief Nurse of Health Education England in 2012, where her projects included Raising the Bar to improve nursing education; introduction of the Nursing Associate role; and the Return to Practice programme to encourage experienced staff to return to nursing. Her other roles and responsibilities have included serving as the Interim Regional Director for London and the South East in 2017 and a secondment to Coventry University in 2019 as acting pro-vice-chancellor..

Mark Radford from NHS England and Improvement was appointed on an interim basis in 2019 and then in the permanent role in April 2020.
