= Liisa =

Female given name

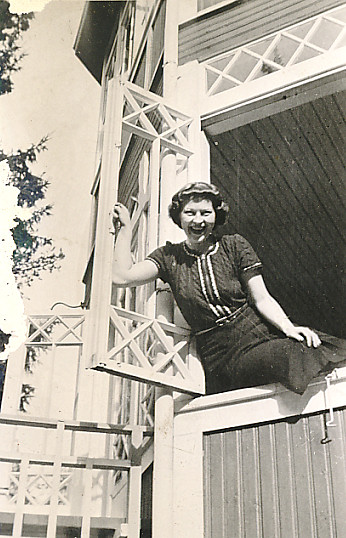
Liisa Nevalainen, Finnish actress

Liisa is a Finnish and Estonian female given name. Its name day is 19 November in both countries. It originated as a variation of the name Lisa or Alisa. As of January 2013, there are more than 100,000 women registered in Finland with this name. It is listed by the Finnish Population Register Centre as one of the top 10 most popular female given names ever. As of 1 January 2020, 1,114 women in Estonia have the first name Liisa, making it the 169th most popular female name in the country. The name is most commonly found in Saare County.

== Notable people ==
Some notable people who have this name include:

- Liisa Aibel (born 1972), Estonian actress
- Liisa Anttila (born 1974), Finnish orienteer
- Liisa Ehrberg (born 1988), Estonian cyclist
- Liisa Hyssälä (born 1948), Finnish politician
- Liisa Jaakonsaari (born 1945), Finnish politician
- Liisa Kauppinen (born 1939), Finnish human rights activist
- Liisa Laurila (born 1974), Finnish swimmer
- Liisa Lilleste (born 1985), Estonian footballer
- Liisa Merisalu (born 2002), Estonian footballer
- Liisa Mustonen (born 1969), Finnish actress
- Liisa Nevalainen (1916–1987), Finnish actress
- Liisa Oviir (born 1977), Estonian lawyer and politician
- Liisa-Ly Pakosta (born 1969), Estonian politician
- Liisa Past (born 1980), Estonian civil servant and security expert
- Liisa Pulk (born 1985), Estonian actress
- Liisa Rantalaiho (born 1933), Finnish sociologist
- Liisa Repo-Martell (born 1971), Canadian actor and artist
- Liisa Salmi (1914–2001), Finnish speed skater
- Liisa Savijarvi (born 1963), Canadian skier
- Liisa Suihkonen (1943–2025), Finnish cross-country skier
- Liisa Tuomi (1924–1989), Finnish actress
- Liisa Turmann (born 1990), Estonian curler
- Liisa Veijalainen (born 1951), Finnish orienteer
- Liisa Winkler, Canadian model

== See also ==
- Lisa (given name)
- Liisi
