= West Coast Wildlife Centre =

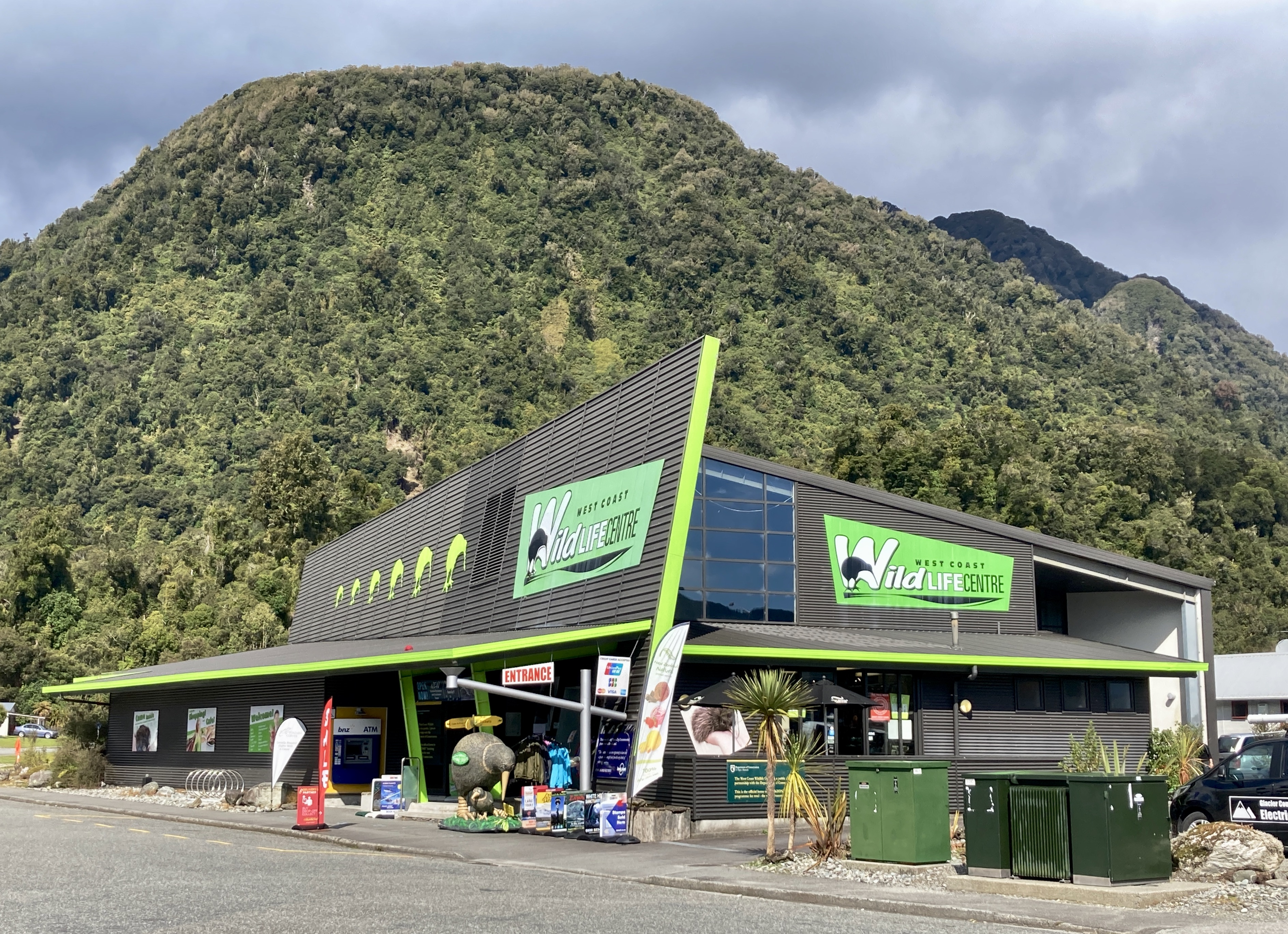
- Interactive map of West Coast Wildlife Centre
- 43°23′19.03″S 170°10′57.83″E
- Date opened: November 2010
- Location: Franz Josef / Waiau
- No. of species: 3
- Major exhibits: Rowi nocturnal house, glacier interpretation, tuatara enclosure, West Coast history
- Director: Richard Benton
- Website: https://www.wildkiwi.co.nz

The West Coast Wildlife Centre is a kiwi-rearing facility in Franz Josef, New Zealand. A public-private partnership with the Department of Conservation and Te Rūnunga o Makaawhio of Ngāi Tahu, it hatches eggs of the kiwi species rowi and Haast tokoeka retrieved from the wild. It rears the chicks until they are large enough for transfer to outdoor enclosures as part of Operation Nest Egg. More than 50 per cent of all living rowi were hatched at the Wildlife Centre. It is also a tourist attraction with several captive tuatara, museum displays, and tours of the rearing facility.

== Origin ==
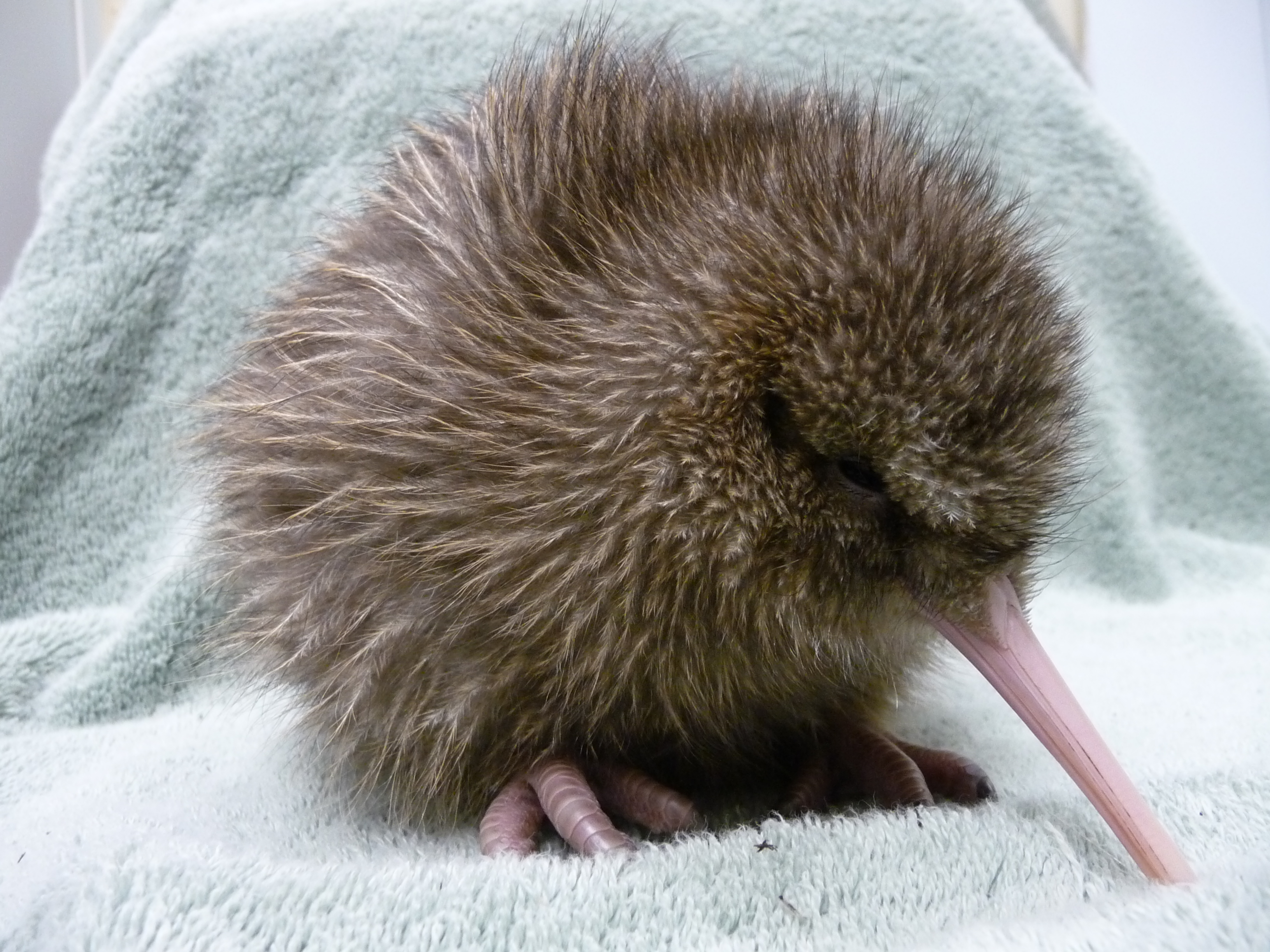
Wawe, the first rowi chick hatched at the Wildlife Centre, 5 days old

The West Coast Wildlife Centre is privately owned facility started by English-born Richard Benton. Benton had purchased the International Antarctic Centre from Christchurch Airport in 2000 and set up a facility for rehabilitation of the local white-flippered subspecies of blue penguin (kororā). Wanting to undertake another conservation initiative, he opened the $2.5 million West Coast Wildlife Centre in November 2010 in the small town of Franz Josef / Waiau, on the West Coast of New Zealand. The town largely exists to support tourist access to nearby Franz Josef Glacier; the Wildlife Centre building was originally a multi-million-dollar indoor ice climbing attraction called the Hukawai Glacier Centre, which had closed just a few months before (the Wildlife Centre incorporated its glacier interpretation exhibit).

In its opening year the Wildlife Centre was helped by Kiwi Encounter at Rainbow Springs, Rotorua, the largest kiwi hatchery in New Zealand (the Wildlife Centre is the largest in the South Island). Its first head kiwi ranger, Bridget Wrenn, worked originally at Rainbow Springs. The first chick to hatch at the Wildlife Centre, on 26 November 2010, was a rowi named Wawe. In their first few years of operation the centre was so successful at rearing chicks they had to expand their facilities three times, extending the programme to Haast tokoeka and expanding the brooder room.

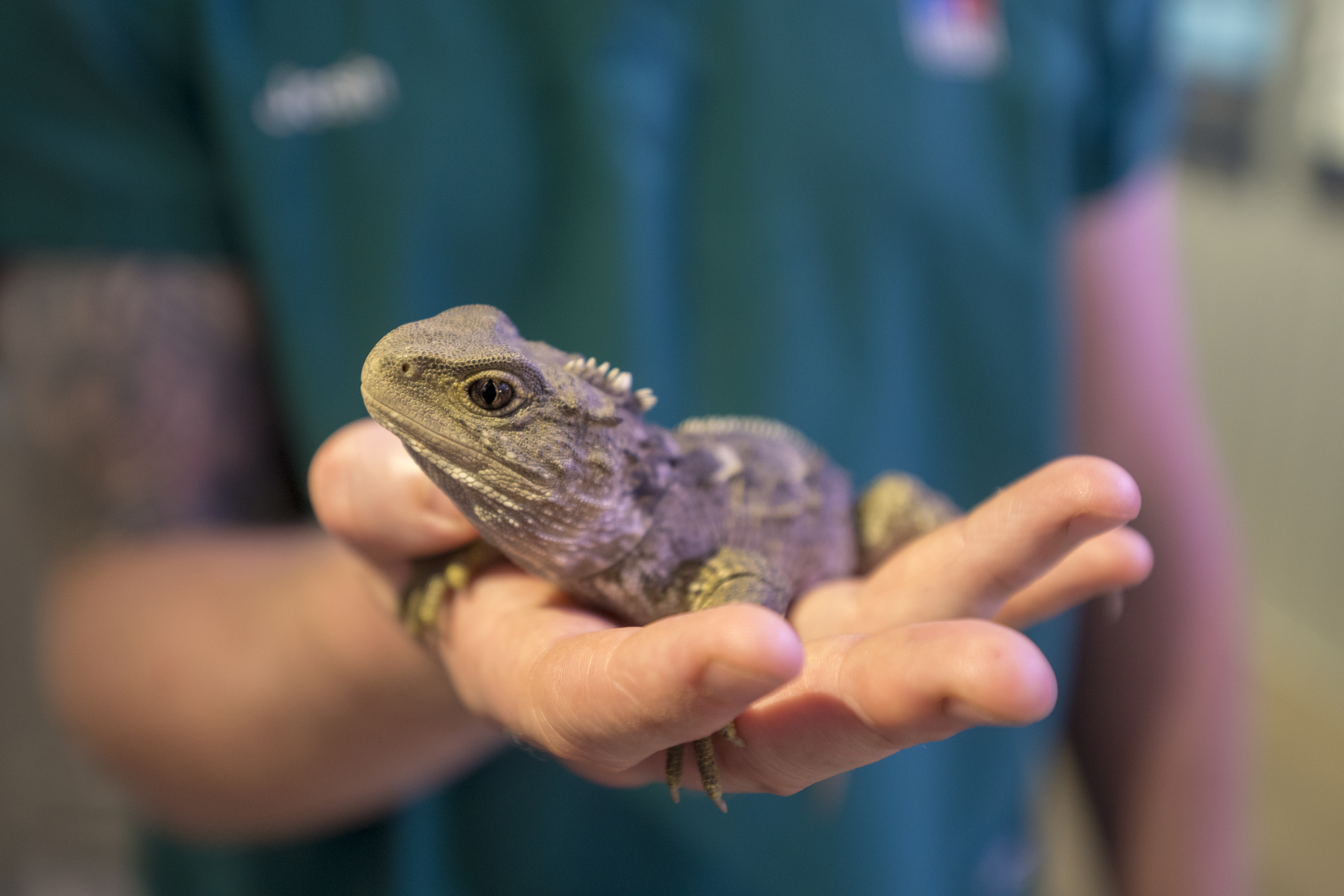
Tuatara

In October 2017 a $150,000 tuatara enclosure opened, designed to mimic the tuatara habitat of Stephens Island and as of 2020 stocked with one male and six females. Following a public competition one female tuatara was named Dorothy, after Franz-Josef-born historian Dorothy Fletcher.

The Wildlife Centre also contains interpretative displays on kiwi, glaciers, and West Coast history. It won West Coast Leading Light Business Excellence awards in 2012, 2013 and 2018. In 2012 it made the Lonely Planet list of top 12 recommendations for tourists in New Zealand.

== Operation Nest Egg ==
Operation Nest Egg is a kiwi captive rearing programme started by the New Zealand Department of Conservation in 1995 in response to the extremely high mortality rate of kiwi chicks (up to 95%). Kiwi chicks are extremely vulnerable to predators such as stoats, so DOC rangers collect eggs to incubate, hatch, and rear in captivity and in predator-free "creches", returning the birds to the wild when they reach an adult weight of 1 kg, sufficient to resist attack by a stoat or feral cat.

During the hatching season (late August to March) eggs are removed from under males in their burrows (in most species of kiwi only males incubate). $300 leg transmitters attached to the males indicate when they have stopped moving and started incubating. A tracking technology known as "Sky Ranger" sends information on nesting pairs, eggs, and the age of an egg to a light aircraft which avoids rangers having to track kiwi on foot through dense forest – a one-hour flight gathers information that could have taken three weeks to gather on the ground. Eggs are retrieved from the nest at about 45 days old and quickly shipped to the Wildlife Centre. After being checked and cleaned in a dedicated egg processing room, they are moved to 35.5 °C incubators, turned and rotated four times a day (to imitate a male rowi's behaviour), and regularly candled with a torch to check on development. Hatching occurs at 78 days of incubation and is a prolonged process, taking around six days. A few days later, the young bird is dry and mobile and is transferred to a brood box, where it can walk around and be fed on a diet of mixed oxheart, cat biscuits, fruit, peas, carrots, corn, and vitamins.

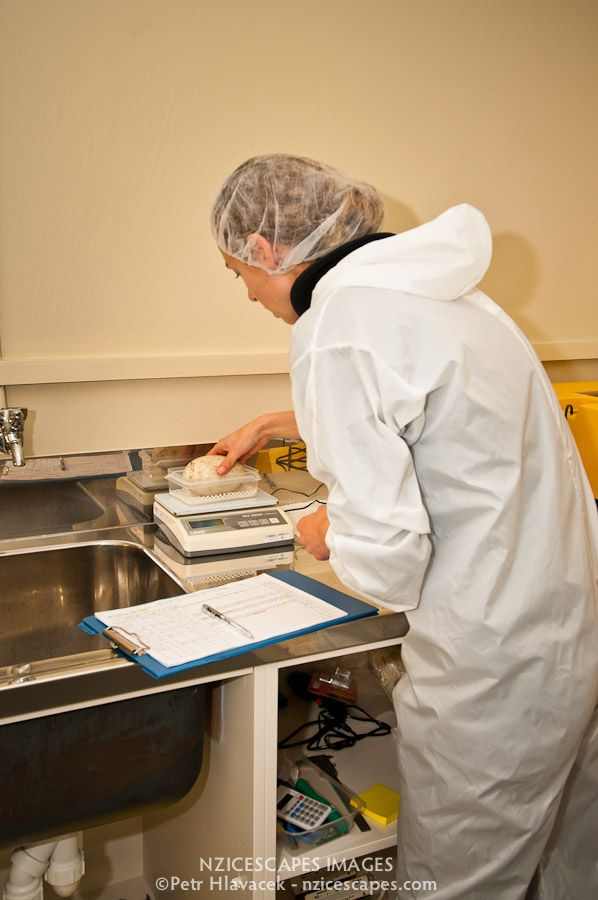
Weighing an egg

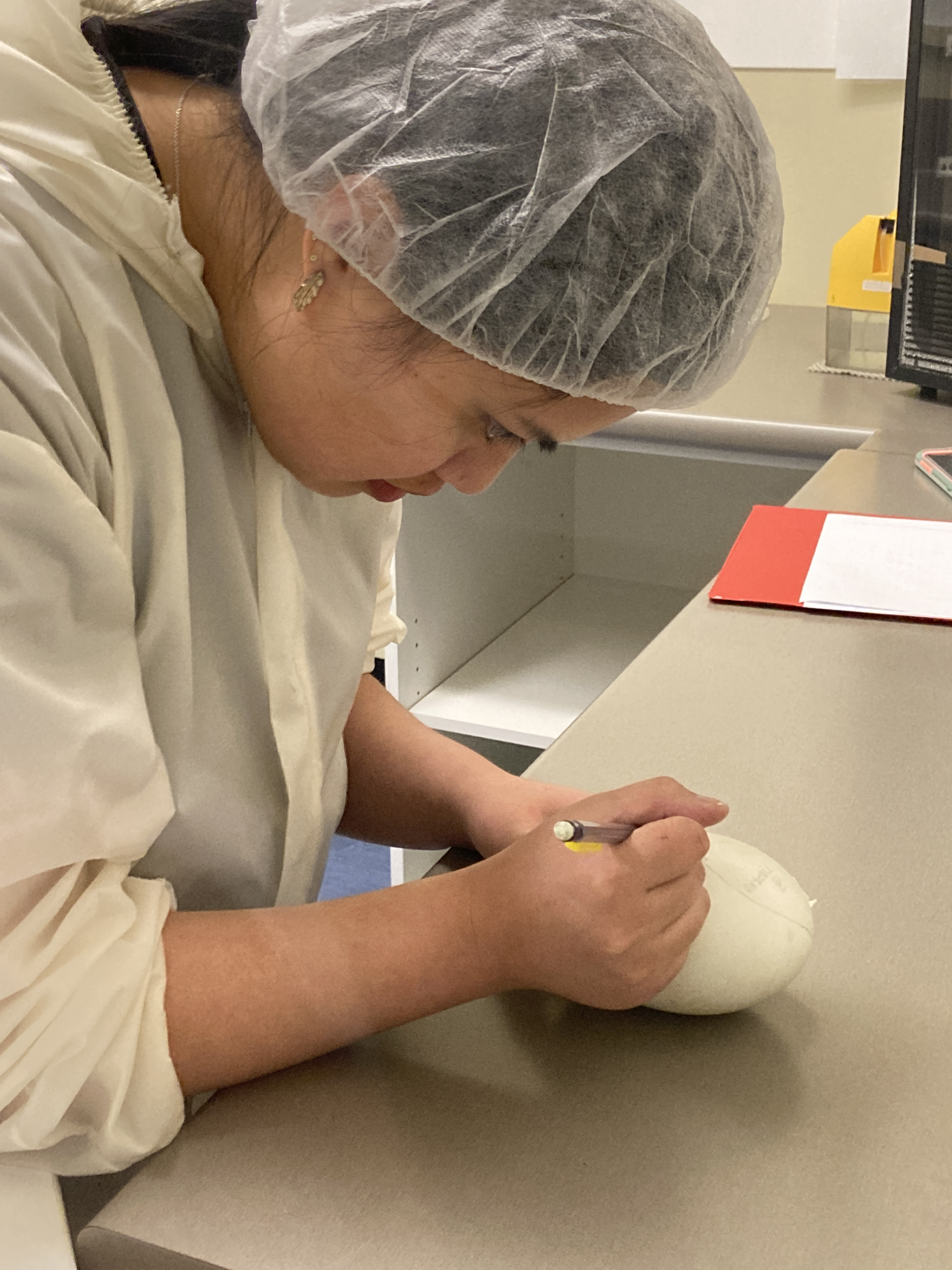
Pencil marks to track chick orientation and extent of air sac

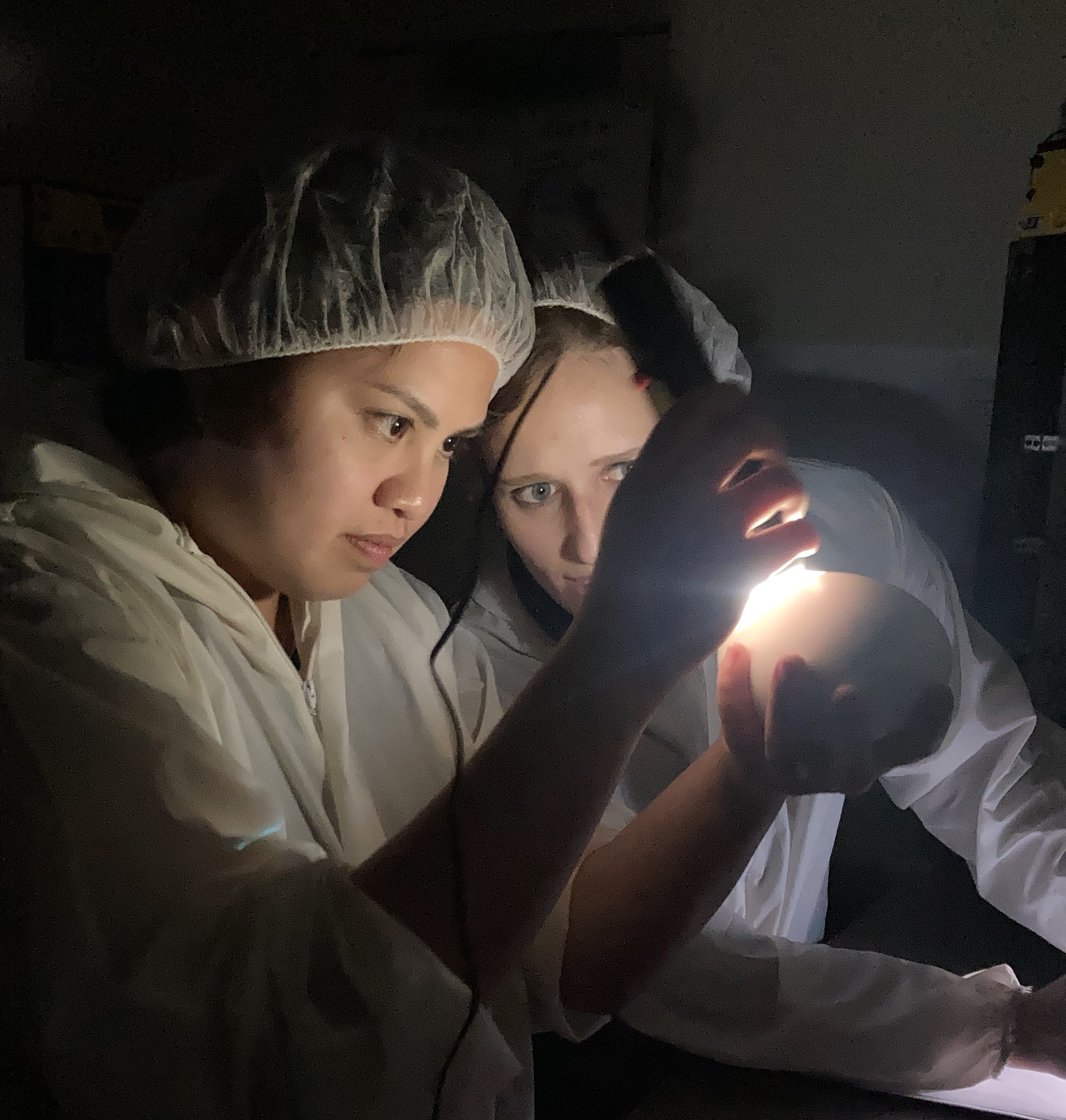
Candling an egg to check development close to hatching

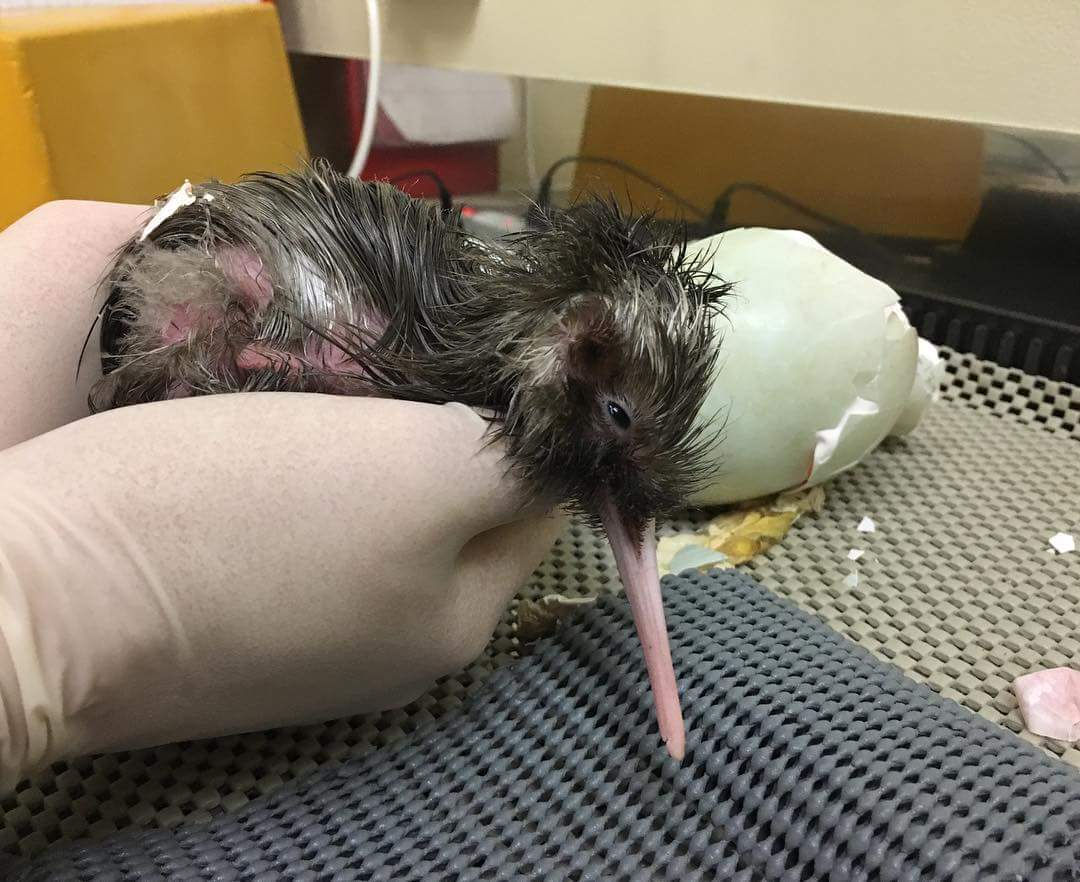
Newly hatched rowi

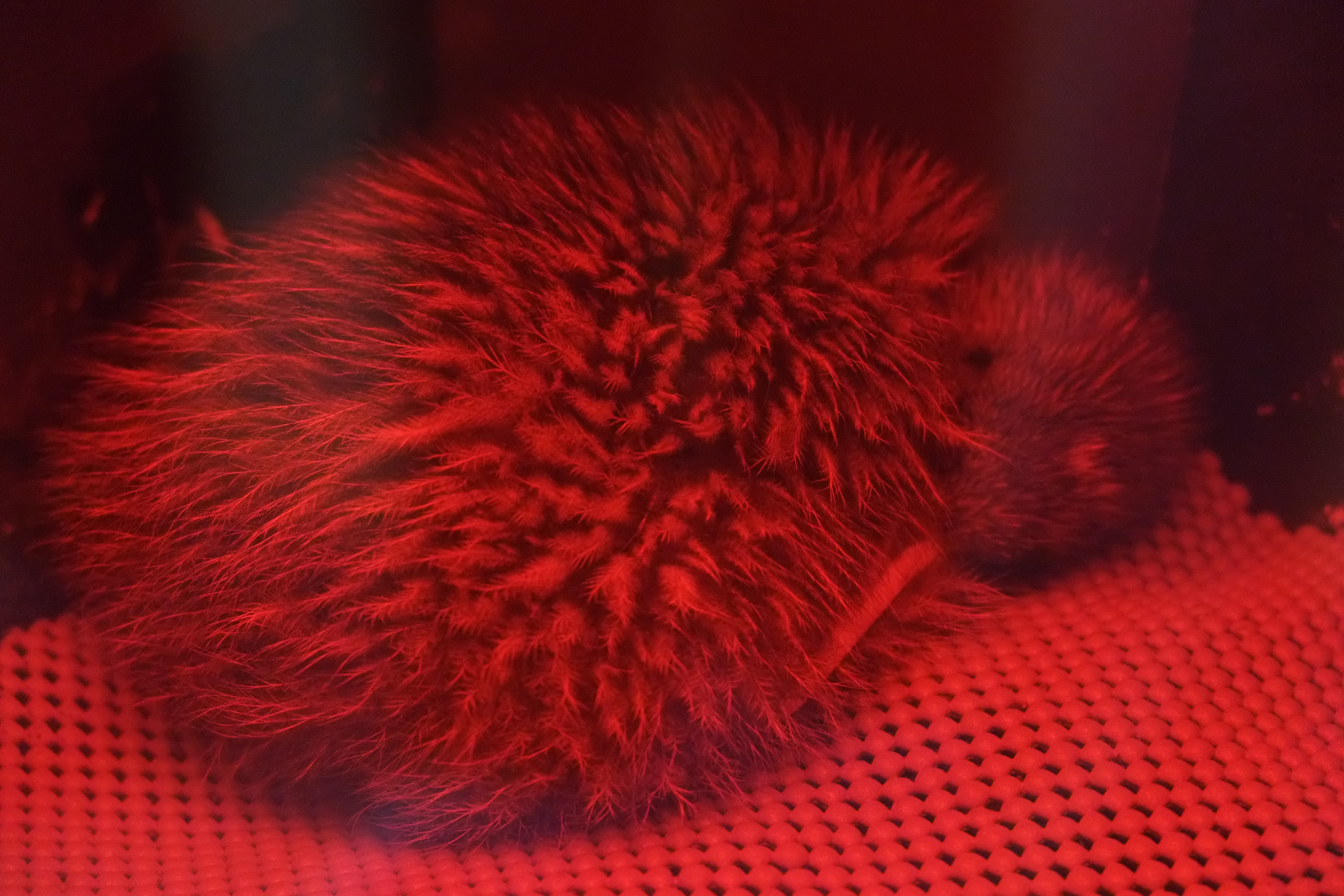
Chick in brood box

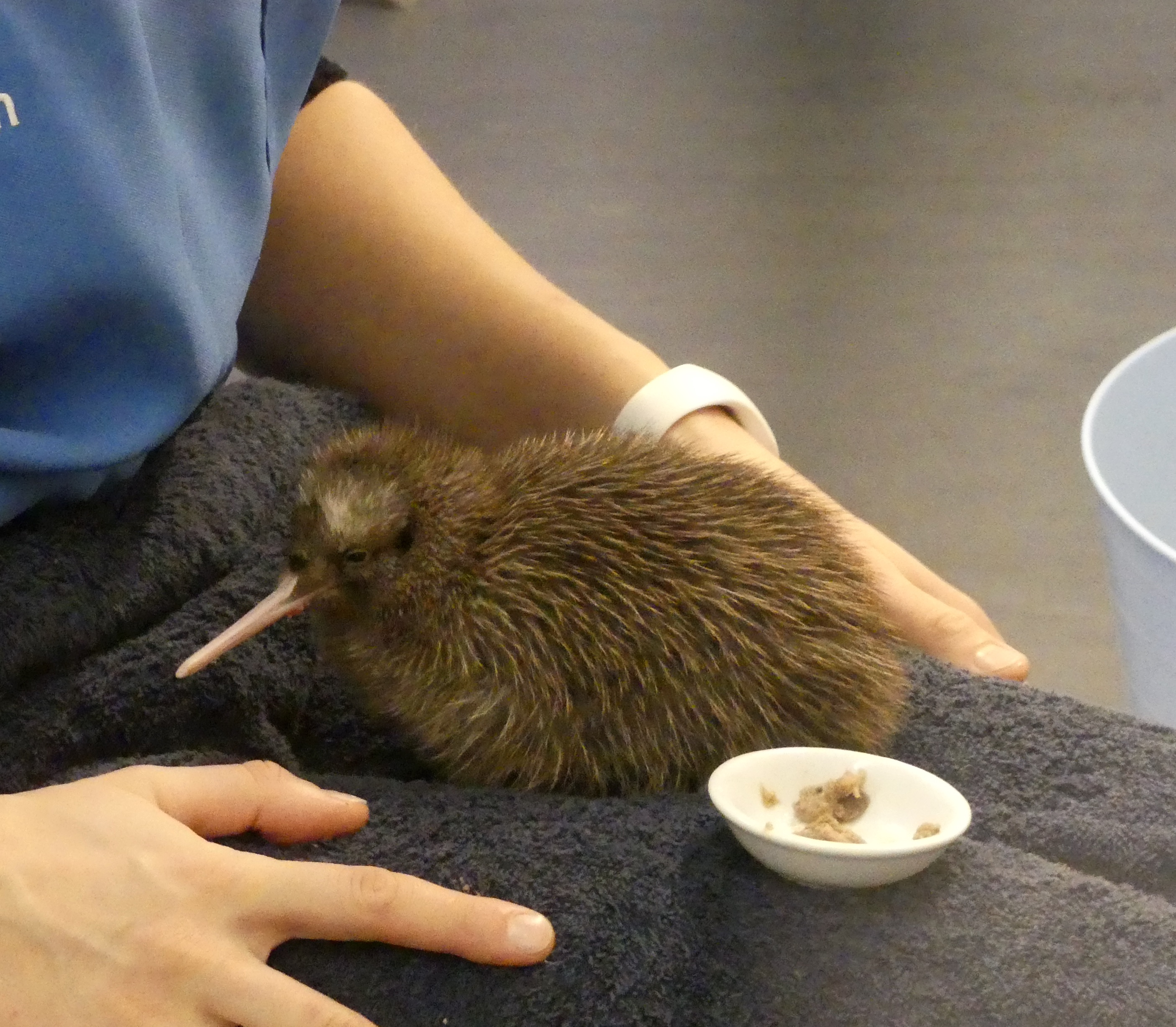
Hand feeding a young chick

Chicks are reared in brood boxes for up to a month with daily checks on health and activity, then swabbed, vaccinated, microchipped, and flown to Willowbank Wildlife Reserve in Christchurch to be raised in outdoor enclosures for one to two months. The juvenile birds are transferred to a predator-free "creche" in the wild – Motuara Island in the Marlborough Sounds for rowi. This takes around a year. The birds are then released into a wild population, either Ōkārito Forest or the Omoeroa Ranges near Fox Glacier, where a new wild population of captive-reared birds was established in late-2018. Kiwi chicks hatched in the wild have a mortality rate of 95%, which is lowered to 30% by the Operation Nest Egg captive rearing programme.

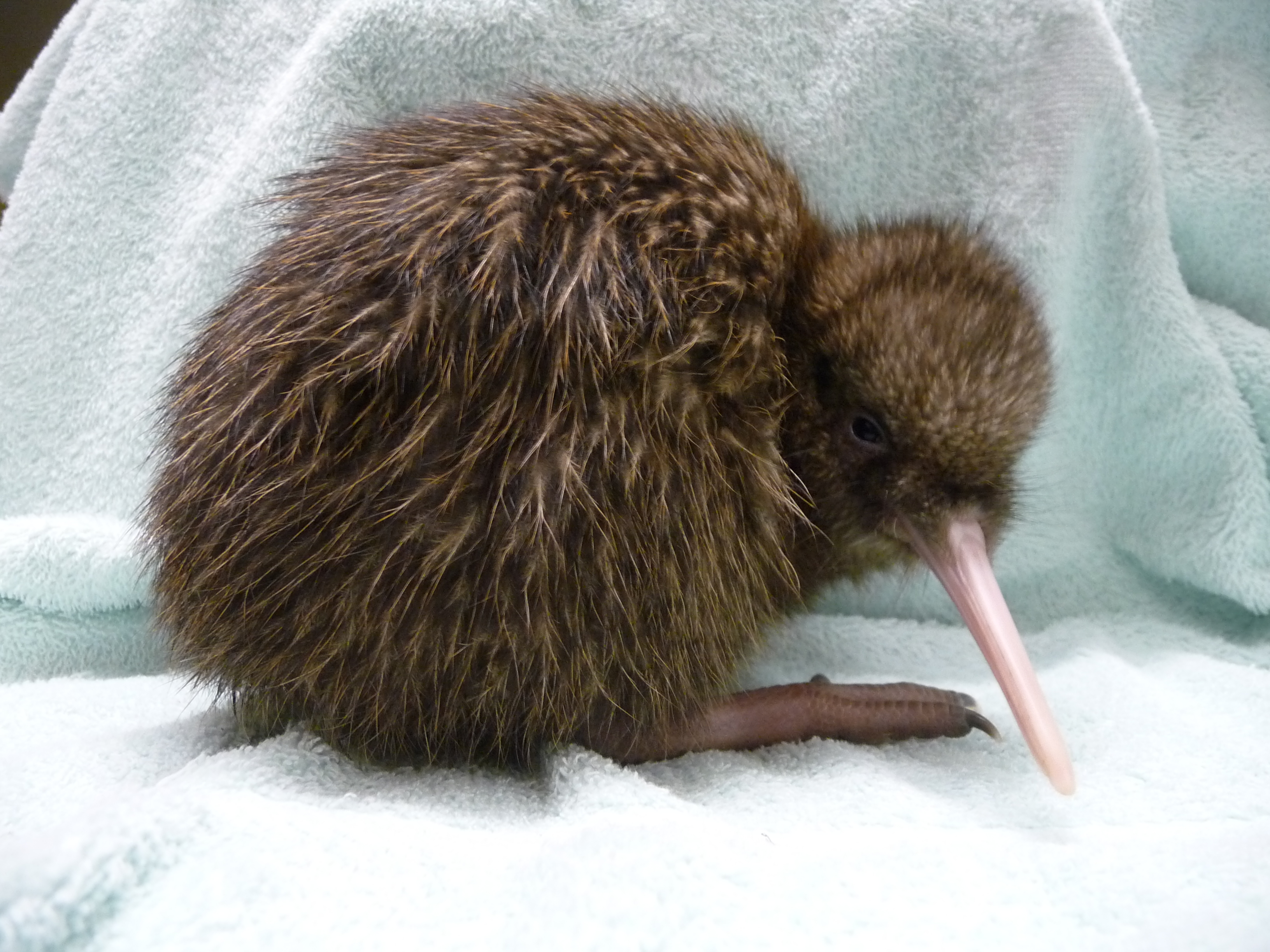
Womble, a 5-day-old rowi

The main species hatched at the Wildlife Centre are rowi (Apteryx rowi), the rarest of the five species of kiwi. Rowi are found only in Ōkārito Forest around Ōkārito Lagoon and the Omoeroa Ranges. The Wildlife Centre hatched its 200th rowi egg in January 2016, and the 300th in October 2019. Sixty eggs were hatched in the 2017–2018 season; the fiftieth chick hatched on Christmas Day and was named Eggnog. Since it opened, more than 50 per cent of all rowi in the world have been hatched by the Wildlife Centre. Operation Nest Egg has been responsible for raising the wild population of rowi from just 165 ageing adults in the 1990s to 600 (as of 2019). In 2017 the threat classification of rowi was upgraded from Nationally Critical to Nationally Vulnerable.

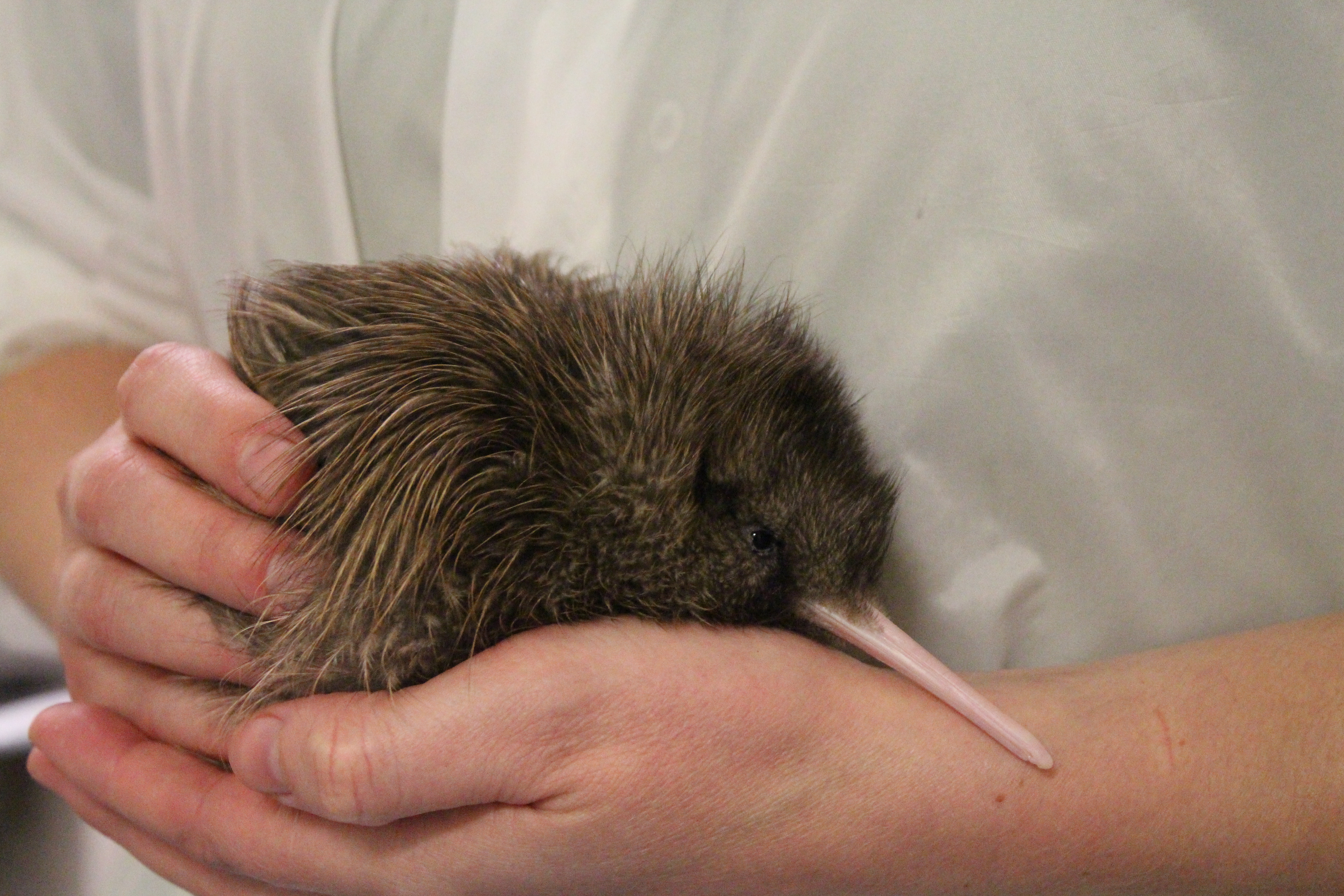
Chopper, a Haast tokoeka

Since August 2011 the Wildlife Centre has also hatched and reared Haast tokoeka (Apteryx australis australis). The most endangered subspecies of tokoeka or Southern brown kiwi, Haast tokoeka have an estimated wild population of less than 500, mostly in the 11,400-hectare (28,000-acre) Haast kiwi sanctuary between the Waiatoto and Arawhata Rivers. The Wildlife Centre's first Haast tokoeka was hatched on 2 October 2011 and named Okahu by Te Rūnunga o Makaawhio. As of 2019, 122 Haast tokoeka have been hatched at the Centre; they are transferred to Orokonui Ecosancturary for rearing and later release into the wild.

The Wildlife Centre also incubated great spotted kiwi eggs for three seasons, ending in 2013.
