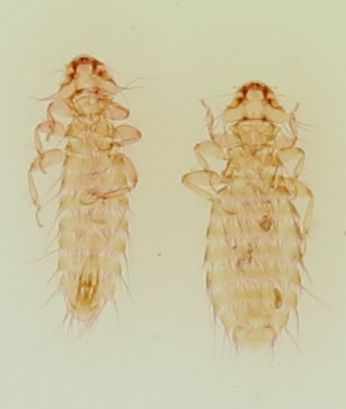
- Female and male A. mirum

Scientific classification
- Domain: Eukaryota
- Kingdom: Animalia
- Phylum: Arthropoda
- Class: Insecta
- Order: Psocodea
- Infraorder: Phthiraptera
- Family: Menoponidae
- Genus: Apterygon; Clay, 1961

Type species
- Apterygon mirum Clay, 1961

Species
- A. dumosum Tandan, 1972; A. hintoni Clay, 1966; A. mirum Clay, 1961; A. okarito Palma & Price, 2004

= Apterygon =

Genus of lice

Apterygon is a genus of louse. It is endemic to New Zealand and is an ectoparasite of kiwi birds (Apteryx). Theresa Clay circumscribed the genus in 1961. In 1947, she had referred to this genus as "New Genus D", but it was not formally named as she needed to confirm the host of her specimen as well as additional material.

== Description ==
Apterygon heads lack preocular slits and the female genital chamber has a cellular circular structure. They lack eyes, have a reduced hypopharynx and a well developed postnotum.

== Species ==
As of 2017, four species are recognized in this genus.

A. mirum, the type species of this genus, was described by Clay in the same paper which named the genus Apterygon. The holotype came from a North Island brown kiwi which was killed by a car in Ōpōtiki, New Zealand. It is found in New Zealand's North Island.

Clay described a second species for this genus, A. hintoni, in 1966. Its type host was a great spotted kiwi and its type locality was Nelson, New Zealand. It is found in New Zealand's South Island.

In 1972, B. K. Tandan described a third species, A. dumosum, based on specimens from a Stewart Island brown kiwi on Stewart Island, New Zealand. It is found throughout New Zealand. In addition to the Stewart Island brown kiwi, it parasitizes the South Island brown kiwi and the little spotted kiwi.

The fourth species to be described was A. okarito, whose description by Ricardo L. Palma and Roger D. Price was published in 2004. Its type host is the Okarito kiwi, found in Ōkārito, New Zealand. It is only found in Westland in New Zealand's South Island.

== Hosts ==
Lice in this genus are ectoparasites of all species of kiwi (Apteryx). The only other lice which parasitize kiwi are in the subgenus Rallicola (Aptericola).
