= Apteryx littoralis =

Apteryx littoralis Temporal range: Pleistocene Calabrian

Scientific classification
- Kingdom: Animalia
- Phylum: Chordata
- Class: Aves
- Infraclass: Palaeognathae
- Order: Apterygiformes
- Family: Apterygidae
- Genus: Apteryx
- Species: †A. littoralis

Binomial name
- †Apteryx littoralis Tennyson & Tomotani, 2021

Extinct species of kiwi

Apteryx littoralis (meaning "kiwi of the shore") is an extinct species of kiwi from New Zealand's North Island. The species was first described in 2021 based on the holotype (NMNZ S.36731), a complete left tarsometatarsus that was found in the Pleistocene (Calabrian)-aged Rangitikei Formation (Kaimatira Pumice Sand).

== Discovery and naming ==
The holotype, NMNZ S.36731, was discovered in 1998 in a strata of the Rangitikei Formation known as the Kaimatira Pumice Sand, near Marton, North Island. NMNZ S.36731 was compared to 161 other tarsometatarsi from other extant kiwi species and the species Apteryx littoralis was named and described by Tennyson & Tomotani in 2021.

== Description ==
A. littoralis is the second oldest record of kiwi known to date and is also the only known extinct species belonging to the Apteryx genus and is one of two known extinct kiwi species – the other is Proapteryx micromeros. A. littoralis most closely resembles A. rowi and A. mantelli in size and shape, but differs in being stouter, with proportionally narrower proximal and distal ends. A. littoralis was also likely around the same size as A. mantelli, making it around 40 cm (16 in) tall when fully grown. Based on this, A. littoralis demonstrates a relatively conservative kiwi morphology since the mid-Pleistocene.

== Paleobiology ==
Based on where the holotype was discovered, Apteryx littoralis was probably restricted to a coastal region due to volcanic activity in the central North Island, restricting its range and habitat to a small region of the island.

== Extinction ==
It is unknown when A. littoralis went extinct, although it disappears from the fossil record around 771,000 years ago, at the end of the Calabrian stage of the Pleistocene. This is likely because rocks from the Rangitikei Formation, where A. littorallis was discovered, stopped being deposited after the Calabrian.

== See also ==
- List of bird species described in the 2020s
