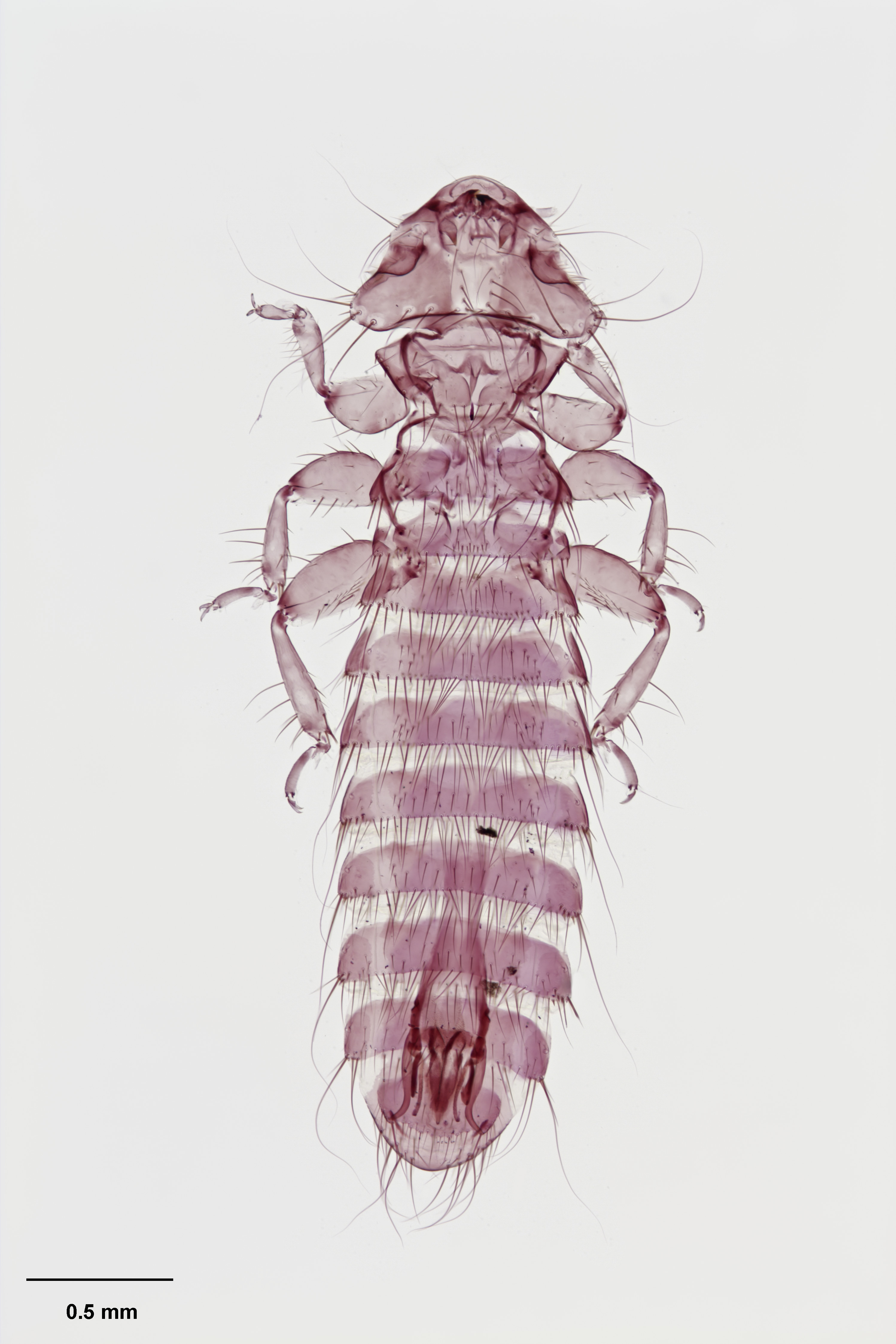

Conservation status
- Nationally Critical (NZ TCS)

Scientific classification
- Kingdom: Animalia
- Phylum: Arthropoda
- Class: Insecta
- Order: Psocodea
- Infraorder: Phthiraptera
- Family: Menoponidae
- Genus: Apterygon
- Species: A. okarito

Binomial name
- Apterygon okarito Palma & Price, 2004

= Apterygon okarito =

Species of louse

Apterygon okarito is a species of louse belonging to the family Menoponidae. It is an ectoparasite of the Okarito Kiwi. The species was described in 2004 by Ricardo Palma and Roger Price and is similar to other Apterygon species, being only separated by minor differences in morphology. Under the New Zealand Threat Classification System, it is considered to be "Nationally Critical".

== Taxonomy ==
This species was described in 2004 by Ricardo Palma and Roger Price, who placed it in the family Menoponidae. The species name "okarito" refers to the type locality which is of the same name. The holotype is stored at Te Papa Museum under registration number AI.012588.

== Description ==
Males of this species are identical to others in the Apterygon genus an can only reliably be separated by minor differences in genitalia. The females are also identical and can be separated by their chaetotaxy.

== Distribution ==
As a consequence of its host species distribution, this species only occurs in Westland, New Zealand.

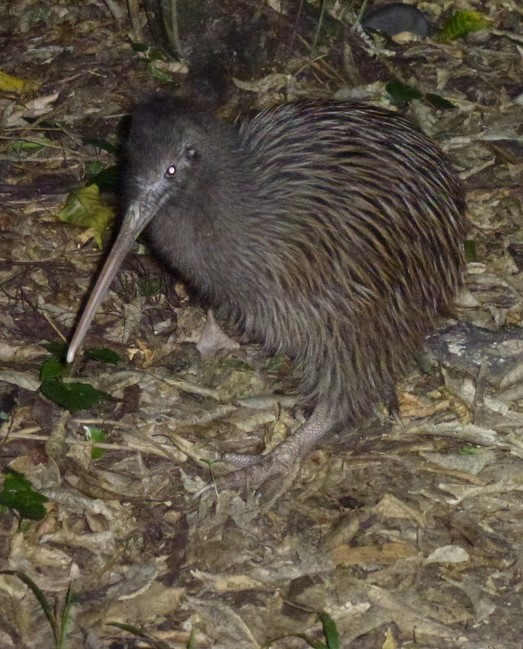
An Okarito kiwi, the only known host of Apterygon okarito.

== Host ==
The only known host species of this lice is the Okarito Kiwi. This host restriction has also been used as evidence of the Okario Kiwi being a distinct species.

== Conservation status ==
Under the New Zealand Threat Classification System, this species is listed as Nationally Critical with the qualifiers of "Conservation Dependent", "Increasing" and "One Location".
