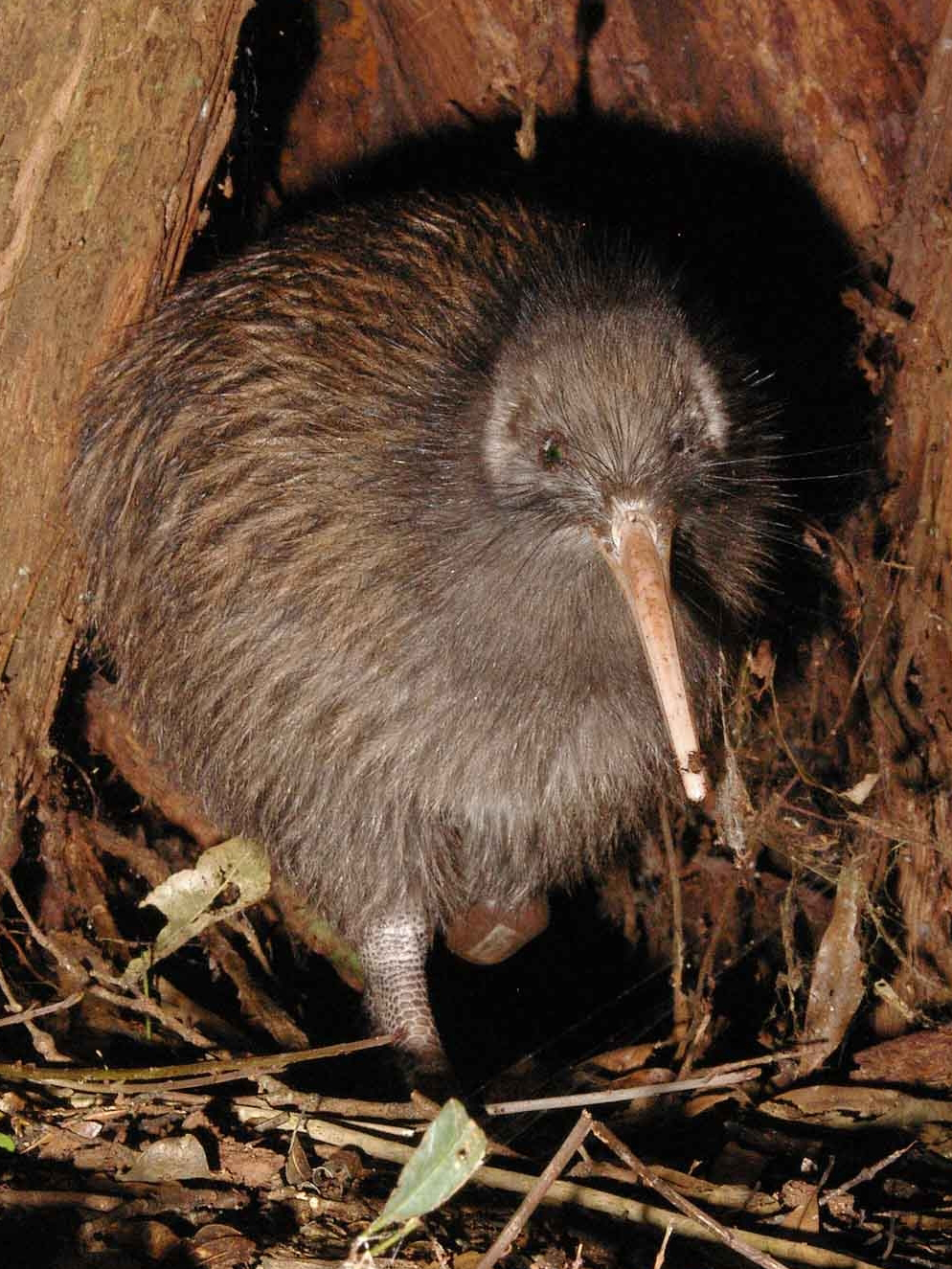
- North Island brown kiwi (Apteryx mantelli)

Scientific classification
- Kingdom: Animalia
- Phylum: Chordata
- Class: Aves
- Infraclass: Palaeognathae
- Clade: Novaeratitae
- Order: Apterygiformes; Haeckel, 1866
- Family: Apterygidae; Gray, 1840
- Genus: Apteryx; Shaw, 1813

Type species
- Apteryx australis Shaw, 1813

Species
- Apteryx maxima Great spotted kiwi Apteryx owenii Little spotted kiwi Apteryx rowi Okarito brown kiwi Apteryx australis Southern brown kiwi Apteryx mantelli North Island brown kiwi †Apteryx littoralis "Kiwi of the shore"
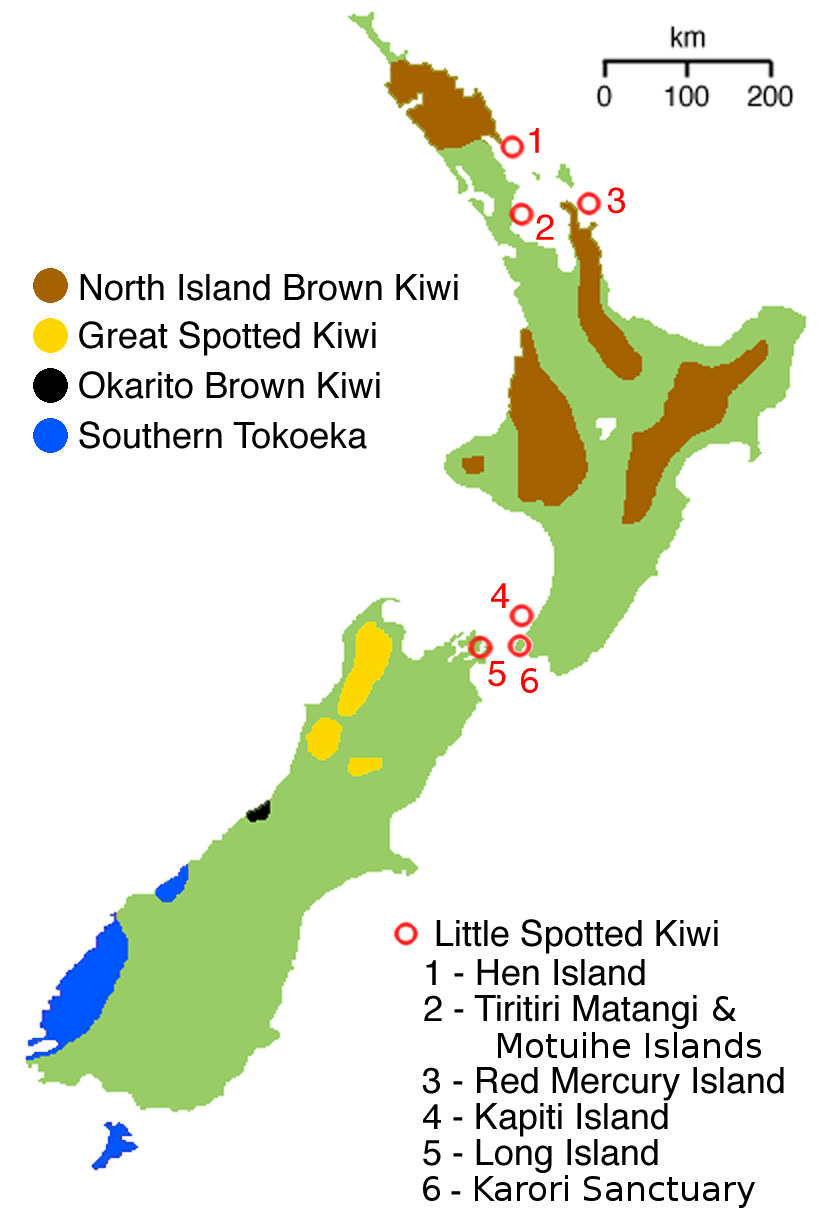
- The distribution of each species of kiwi

Synonyms
- Stictapteryx Iredale & Mathews, 1926; Kiwi Verheyen, 1960; Pseudapteryx Lydekker 1891

= Kiwi (bird) =

Kiwi Temporal range: Miocene–Recent

Order of birds

Kiwi (Note: /ˈkiːwiː/ KEE-wee) are flightless birds endemic to New Zealand of the order Apterygiformes. The five extant species fall into the family Apterygidae (Note: /ˌæptəˈrɪdʒədiː/) and genus Apteryx. (Note: /ˈæptərɪks/) Approximately the size of a domestic chicken, kiwi are the smallest ratites (which also include ostriches, emus, rheas, cassowaries and the extinct elephant birds and moa).

DNA sequence comparisons have yielded the conclusion that kiwi are much more closely related to the extinct Malagasy elephant birds than to the moa with which they shared New Zealand. There are five recognised species, four of which are currently listed as vulnerable, and one of which is near threatened. All species have been negatively affected by historic deforestation, but their remaining habitat is well protected in large forest reserves and national parks. At present, the greatest threat to their survival is predation by invasive mammalian predators.

The vestigial wings are so small as to be invisible under their bristly, hair-like, two-branched feathers. Kiwi eggs are one of the largest in proportion to body size (up to 20% of the female's weight) of any order of bird in the world. Other unique adaptations of kiwi, such as short and stout legs and using their nostrils at the end of their long beak to detect prey before they see it, have helped the bird to become internationally well known.

The kiwi is recognised as an icon of New Zealand, and the association is so strong that the term Kiwi is used internationally as the colloquial demonym for New Zealanders.

== Etymology ==
The Māori word kiwi is generally accepted to be "of imitative origin" from its call. Some linguists derive the word from Proto-Nuclear Polynesian *kiwi, which refers to Numenius tahitiensis, the bristle-thighed curlew, a migratory bird that winters in the tropical Pacific islands that kind of resembles with its long decurved bill and brown body. So when the first Polynesian settlers arrived, they may have applied the word kiwi to the newfound bird. Some linguists like Robert Blust however propose that kiwi originated from Proto-Oceanic name for the Pacific golden plover, *kiwiwi.

Kiwi normally stays unchanged when pluralised in English, mirroring its usage in the Māori language itself. This contrasts with when kiwi is used to refer to a group of New Zealanders, which is typically pluralised as kiwis.

== Taxonomy and systematics ==
The genus name Apteryx is derived from Ancient Greek 'without wing': a- (ἀ-), 'without' or 'not'; ptéryx (πτέρυξ), 'wing'.

Although it was long presumed that the kiwi was closely related to the other New Zealand ratites, the moa, recent DNA studies have identified its closest relative as the extinct elephant bird of Madagascar, and among extant ratites, the kiwi is more closely related to the emu and the cassowaries than to the moa.

Research published in 2013 on an extinct genus, Proapteryx, known from the Miocene deposits of the Saint Bathans Fauna, found that it was smaller and probably capable of flight, supporting the hypothesis that the ancestor of the kiwi reached New Zealand independently from moas, which were already large and flightless by the time kiwi appeared.

=== Species ===
There are five known extant species of kiwi, with a number of subspecies. One extinct species, Apteryx littoralis is also known. A 2016 study conducted phylogenetic and population genetic analyses of the genus Apteryx. A Bayesian phylogeny using 1,710 base pairs of mtDNA for 203 individuals (including Holocene-aged fossil kiwi) showed that all five recognized species of kiwi are reciprocally monophyletic. The phylogeny also showed extensive differentiation between extant populations within A. australis and A. mantelli as well as fossil populations in A. australis, A. owenii and A. rowi. The researchers generated the following species tree of the five recognized species of kiwi in two clades (spotted and brown) with all divergence events having occurred within the last 8 million years.

- Apteryx (3.85 mya)
  - (0.55 mya)
    - Apteryx owenii
    - Apteryx maxima
  - (1.56 mya)
    - - (1.12 mya)
        - Apteryx mantelli
        - Apteryx rowi
    - Apteryx australis

Apteryx (Shaw, 1813) Extant species
Image	Common Name	Scientific name	Distribution	Population	IUCN status Population trend
	Southern brown kiwi; Tokoeka; Common kiwi	Apteryx australis (Shaw, 1813)		16,500	VU ▲
	North Island brown kiwi	Apteryx mantelli (Bartlett, 1851)		26,600	VU
	Great spotted kiwi; Great grey kiwi; Roroa	Apteryx maxima (Sclater, PL & Hochstetter, 1861)		9,300	VU ▼
	Little spotted kiwi; Little grey kiwi; Kiwi pukupuku	Apteryx owenii (Gould, 1847)		1,500	NT ▲
	Okarito kiwi; Okarito brown kiwi; Rowi	Apteryx rowi (Tennyson et al., 2003)		350–400	VU ▲

== Description ==
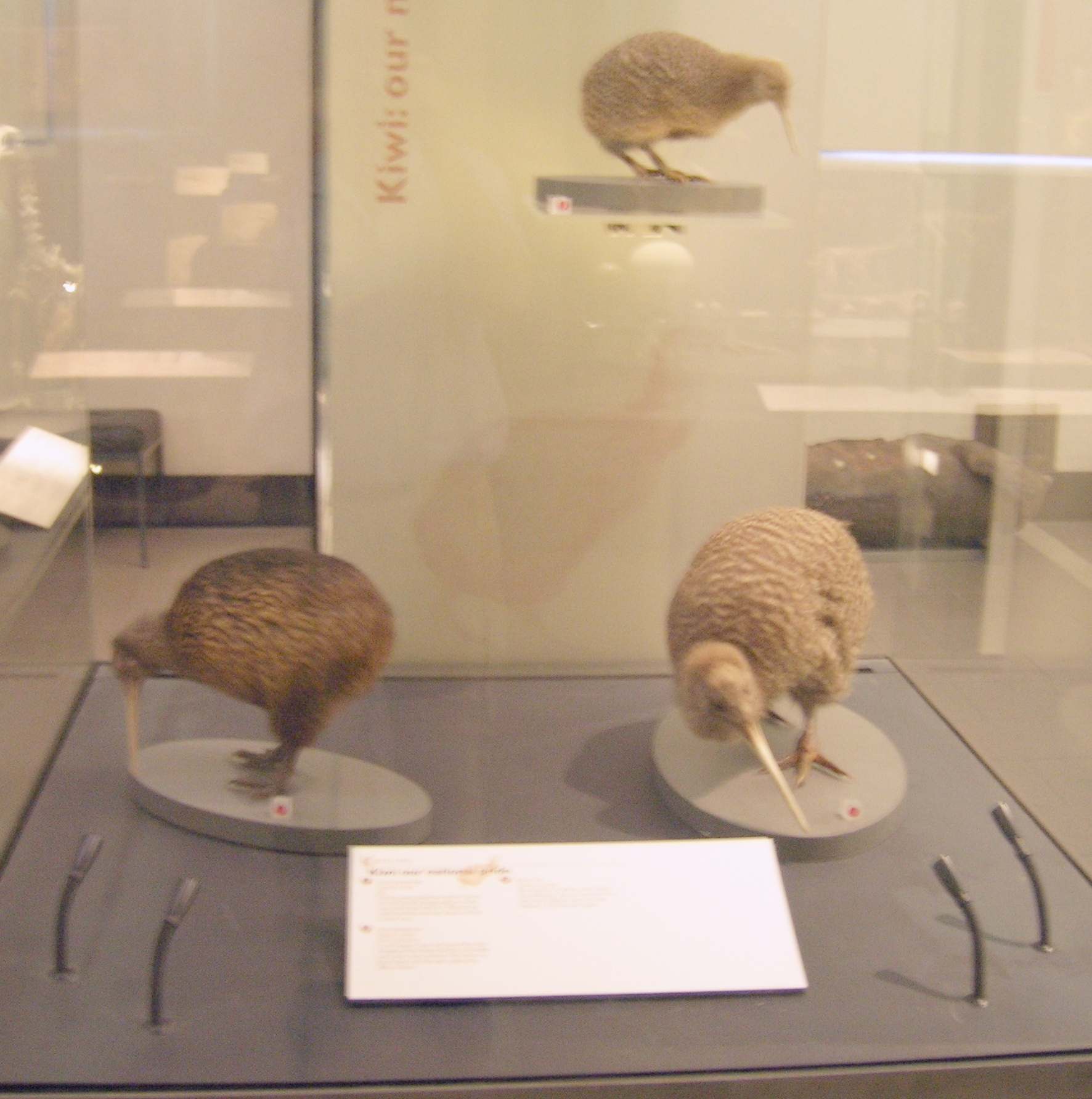
Clockwise from left: brown kiwi (Apteryx australis), little spotted kiwi (Apteryx owenii) and great spotted kiwi (Apteryx haastii) at Auckland War Memorial Museum

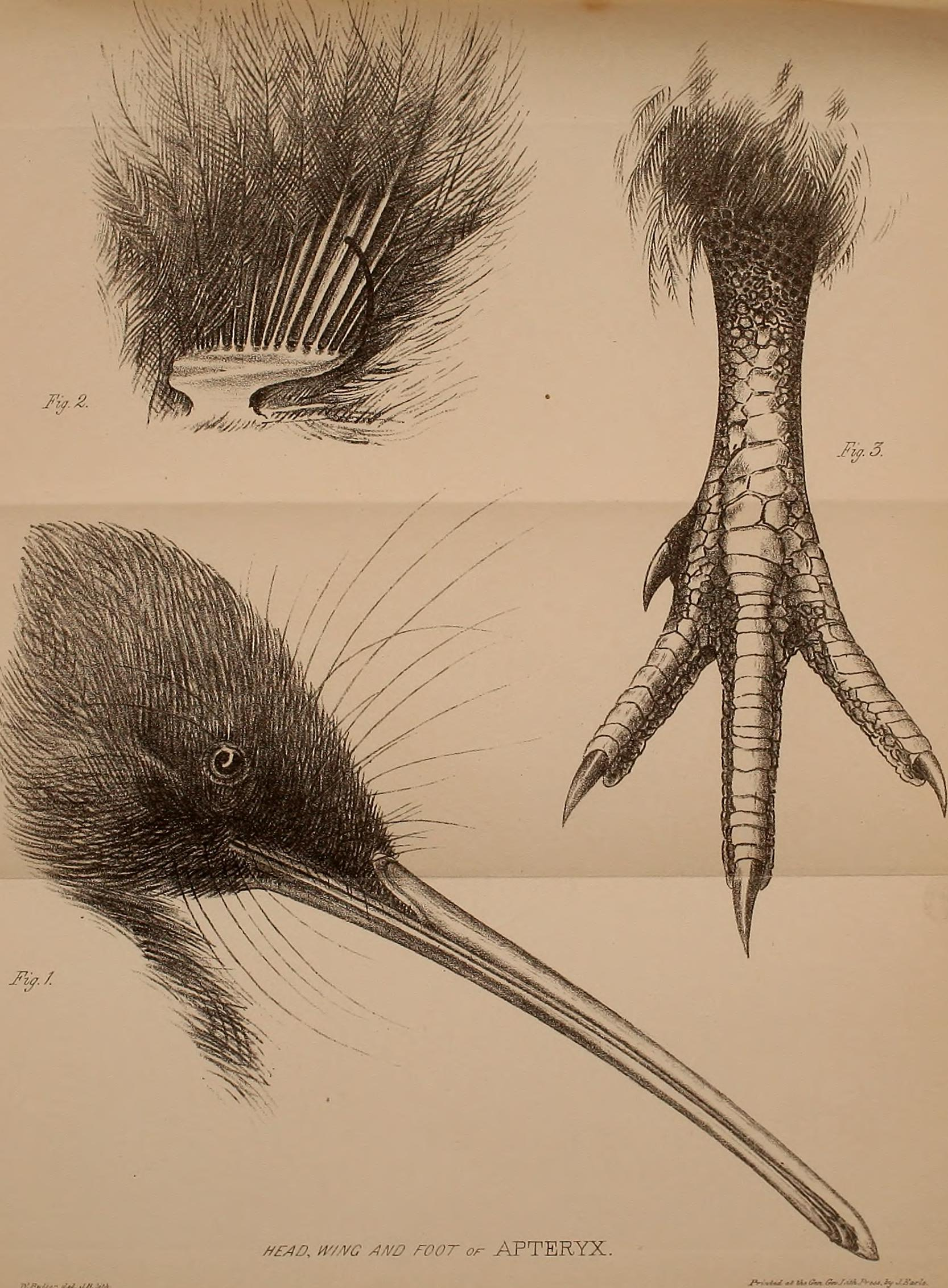
1860s drawing of Apteryx, illustrating its distinctive features, including long beak, short legs and claws, and dark hair-like feathers.

Their adaptation to a terrestrial life is extensive: like all the other ratites (ostrich, emu, rhea and cassowary), they have no keel on the sternum to anchor wing muscles. The vestigial wings are so small that they are invisible under the bristly, hair-like, two-branched feathers. While most adult birds have bones with hollow insides to minimise weight and make flight practicable, kiwi have marrow, like mammals and the young of other birds. Like most other ratites, they have no uropygial gland (preen gland). Their bill is long, pliable and sensitive to touch, and their eyes have a reduced pecten. Their feathers lack barbules and aftershafts, and they have large vibrissae around the gape. They have 13 flight feathers, no tail and a small pygostyle. Their gizzard is weak and their caecum is long and narrow.

The eye of the kiwi is the smallest relative to body mass in all avian species, resulting in the smallest visual field as well. The eye has small specialisations for a nocturnal lifestyle, but kiwi rely more heavily on their other senses (auditory, olfactory, and somatosensory system). The sight of the kiwi is so underdeveloped that blind specimens have been observed in nature, showing how little they rely on sight for survival and foraging. In an experiment, it was observed that one-third of a population of A. rowi in New Zealand under no environmental stress had ocular lesions in one or both eyes. The same experiment examined three specific specimens that showed complete blindness and found them to be in good physical standing outside of ocular abnormalities. A 2018 study revealed that the kiwi's closest relatives, the extinct elephant birds, also shared this trait despite their great size.

Unlike virtually every other palaeognath, which are generally small-brained by bird standards, kiwi have proportionally large encephalisation quotients. Hemisphere proportions are even similar to those of parrots and songbirds, though there is no evidence of similarly complex behaviour.

The call of a male North Island Brown Kiwi Apteryx mantelli

== Behaviour and ecology ==
Before the arrival of humans in the 13th century or earlier, New Zealand's only endemic mammals were three species of bat, and the ecological niches that in other parts of the world were filled by creatures as diverse as horses, wolves and mice were taken up by birds (and, to a lesser extent, reptiles, insects and gastropods).

The kiwi's mostly nocturnal habits may be a result of habitat intrusion by predators, including humans. In areas of New Zealand where introduced predators have been removed, such as sanctuaries, kiwi are often seen in daylight. They prefer subtropical and temperate podocarp and beech forests, but they are being forced to adapt to different habitat, such as sub-alpine scrub, tussock grassland, and the mountains. Kiwi have a highly developed sense of smell, unusual in a bird, and are the only birds with nostrils at the end of their long beaks. Kiwi eat small invertebrates, seeds, grubs, and many varieties of worms. They also may eat fruit, small crayfish, eels and amphibians. Because their nostrils are located at the end of their long beaks, kiwi can locate insects and worms underground using their keen sense of smell, without actually seeing or feeling them. This sense of smell is due to a highly developed olfactory chamber and surrounding regions. It is a common belief that the kiwi relies solely on its sense of smell to catch prey, but this has not been scientifically observed. Lab experiments have suggested that A. australis can rely on olfaction alone but is not consistent under natural conditions. Instead, the kiwi may rely on auditory and/or vibrotactile cues.

Relative size of the egg

=== Mating and breeding ===
Once bonded, a male and female kiwi tend to live their entire lives as a monogamous couple. During the mating season, June to March, the pair call to each other at night, and meet in the nesting burrow every three days. These relationships may last for up to 20 years. They are unusual among other birds in that, along with some raptors, they have a functioning pair of ovaries. (In most birds and in platypuses, the right ovary never matures, so that only the left is functional.).

Usually, only one egg is laid per season. The kiwi lays one of the largest eggs in proportion to its size of any bird in the world, (Note: Some petrels may exceed this.) so even though the kiwi is about the size of a domestic chicken, it is able to lay eggs that are about six times the size of a chicken's egg. Kiwi eggs can weigh up to one-quarter the weight of the female, helped by their inability to fly that could limit the extent by its body weight; brown kiwi females carry and lay a single egg that may weigh as much as 450 g (16 oz). The eggs are smooth in texture, and are ivory or greenish white. The male incubates the egg, except for the great spotted kiwi, A. haastii, in which both parents are involved. The incubation period is 63–92 days. Producing the huge egg places significant physiological stress on the female; for the thirty days it takes to grow the fully developed egg, the female must eat three times her normal amount of food. Two to three days before the egg is laid there is little space left inside the female for her stomach and she is forced to fast.

It was believed that the large eggs were a trait of much larger moa-like ancestors, and that kiwi retained large eggs as an evolutionarily neutral trait as they became smaller. However, research in the early 2010s suggested that kiwi were descended from smaller flighted birds that flew to New Zealand and Madagascar, where they gave rise to kiwi and elephant birds. The large egg is instead thought to be an adaptation for precocity, enabling kiwi chicks to hatch mobile and with yolk to sustain them for two and half weeks. The large eggs would be safe in New Zealand's historical absence of egg-eating ground predators, while the mobile chicks would be able to evade chick-eating flying predators.

== Pests ==
Lice in the genus Apterygon and in the subgenus Rallicola (Aptericola) are exclusively ectoparasites of kiwi species.

== Status and conservation ==
Traffic sign in New Zealand cautioning drivers of nearby kiwi

Nationwide studies show that only around 5–10% of kiwi chicks survive to adulthood without management. As of 2018 over 70% of kiwi populations are unmanaged. However, in areas under active pest management, survival rates for North Island brown kiwi can be far higher. For example, prior to a joint 1080 poison operation undertaken by DOC and the Animal Health Board in Tongariro Forest in 2006, 32 kiwi chicks were radio-tagged.

Efforts to protect kiwi have had some success, and in 2017 two species were downlisted from endangered to vulnerable by the IUCN. In 2018 the Department of Conservation released its current Kiwi Conservation Plan.

=== Sanctuaries ===
In 2000, the Department of Conservation set up five kiwi sanctuaries focused on developing methods to protect kiwi and to increase their numbers.

There are three kiwi sanctuaries in the North Island:
- Whangarei Kiwi Sanctuary (for Northland brown kiwi)
- Moehau Kiwi Sanctuary on the Coromandel Peninsula (Coromandel brown kiwi)
- Tongariro Kiwi Sanctuary near Taupō (western brown kiwi)
and two in the South Island:
- Okarito Kiwi Sanctuary (Okarito kiwi)
- Haast Kiwi Sanctuary (Haast tokoeka)

A number of other mainland conservation islands and fenced sanctuaries have significant populations of kiwi, including:

- Zealandia fenced sanctuary in Wellington (little spotted kiwi)
- Sanctuary Mountain Maungatautari in Waikato (brown kiwi)
- Bushy Park Forest Reserve near Kai Iwi, Whanganui (brown kiwi)
- Otanewainuku Forest in the Bay of Plenty Region (brown kiwi)
- Hurunui Mainland Island, south branch, Hurunui River, North Canterbury (great spotted kiwi)
- Brook Waimārama Sanctuary in Nelson (little spotted kiwi)

North Island brown kiwi were introduced to the Cape Sanctuary in Hawke's Bay between 2008 and 2011, which in turn provided captive-raised chicks that were released back into Maungataniwha Native Forest.

Sanctuaries for kiwi are also referred to as 'kōhanga sites' from the Māori word for 'nest' or 'nursery'.

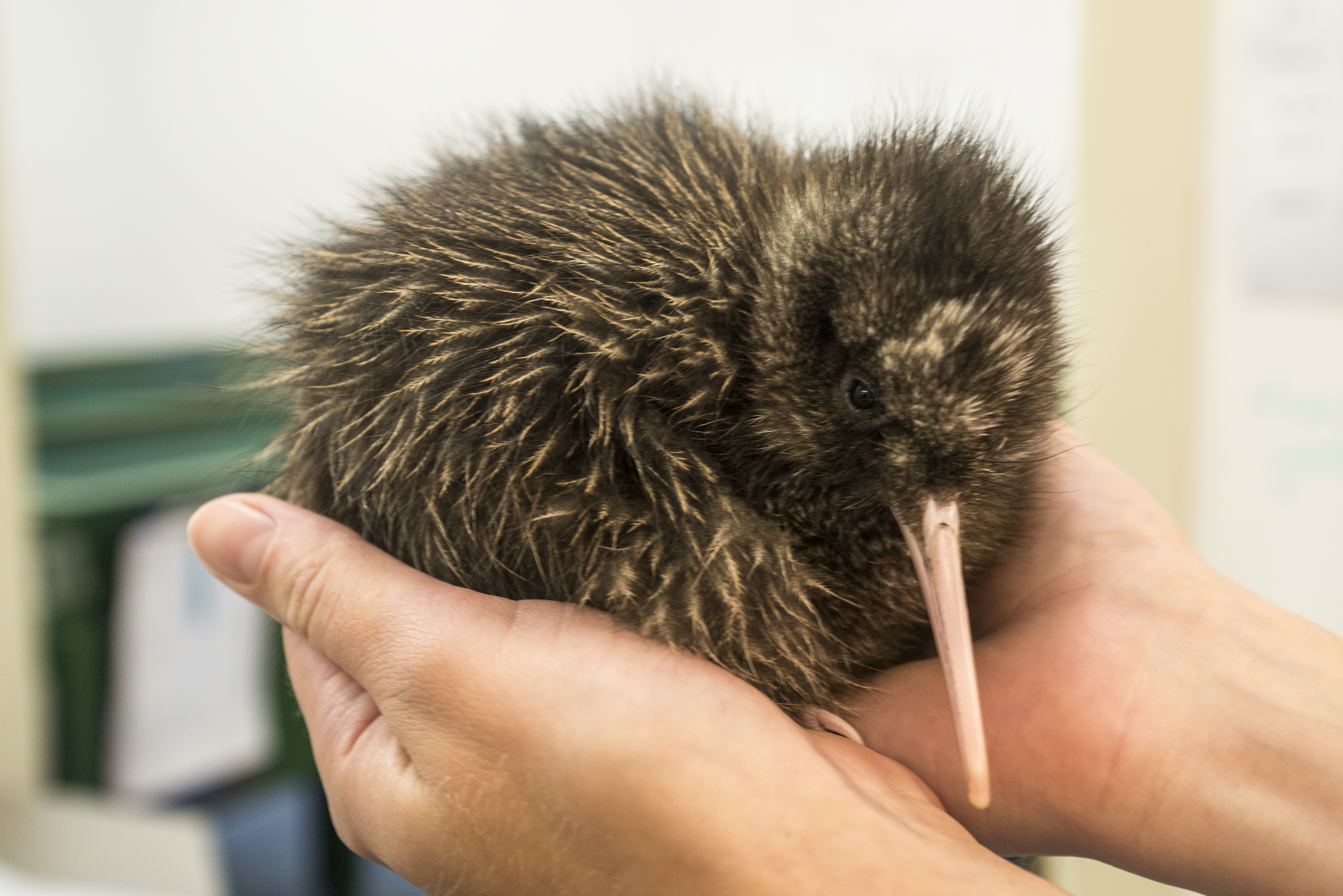
The West Coast Wildlife Centre, at Franz Josef on the southern West Coast of New Zealand, is part of Project Nest Egg, breeding the vulnerable local species of kiwi known as the rowi.

=== Operation Nest Egg ===
Operation Nest Egg is a programme run by the BNZ Save the Kiwi Trust—a partnership between the Bank of New Zealand, the Department of Conservation and the Royal Forest and Bird Protection Society. Kiwi eggs and chicks are removed from the wild and hatched and/or raised in captivity until big enough to fend for themselves—usually when they weigh around 1200 grams (42 ounces). They are then returned to the wild. An Operation Nest Egg bird has a 65% chance of surviving to adulthood—compared to just 5% for wild-hatched and -raised chicks. The tool is used on all kiwi species except little spotted kiwi.

=== 1080 poison ===
In 2004, anti-1080 (sodium fluoroacetate) activist Phillip Anderton posed for the New Zealand media with a kiwi he claimed had been poisoned. An investigation revealed that Anderton lied to journalists and the public. He had used a kiwi that had been caught in a possum trap. Extensive monitoring shows that kiwi are not at risk from the use of biodegradable 1080 poison.

=== Threats ===
Introduced mammalian predators, namely stoats, dogs, ferrets, and cats, are the principal threats to kiwi. The biggest threat to kiwi chicks is stoats, while dogs are the biggest threat to adult kiwi. Stoats are responsible for approximately half of kiwi chick deaths in many areas through New Zealand. Young kiwi chicks are vulnerable to stoat predation until they reach about 1–1.2 kg (2.2–2.6 lb) in weight, at which time they can usually defend themselves. Cats also to a lesser extent prey on kiwi chicks. These predators can cause large and abrupt declines in populations. In particular, dogs find the distinctive strong scent of kiwi irresistible and easy to track, such that they can catch and kill kiwi in seconds. Motor vehicle strike is a threat to all kiwi where roads cross through their habitat. Badly set possum traps often kill or maim kiwi.

Habitat destruction is another major threat to kiwi; restricted distribution and small size of some kiwi populations increases their vulnerability to inbreeding. Research has shown that the combined effect of predators and other mortality (accidents, etc.) results in less than 5% of kiwi chicks surviving to adulthood.

== Relationship to humans ==
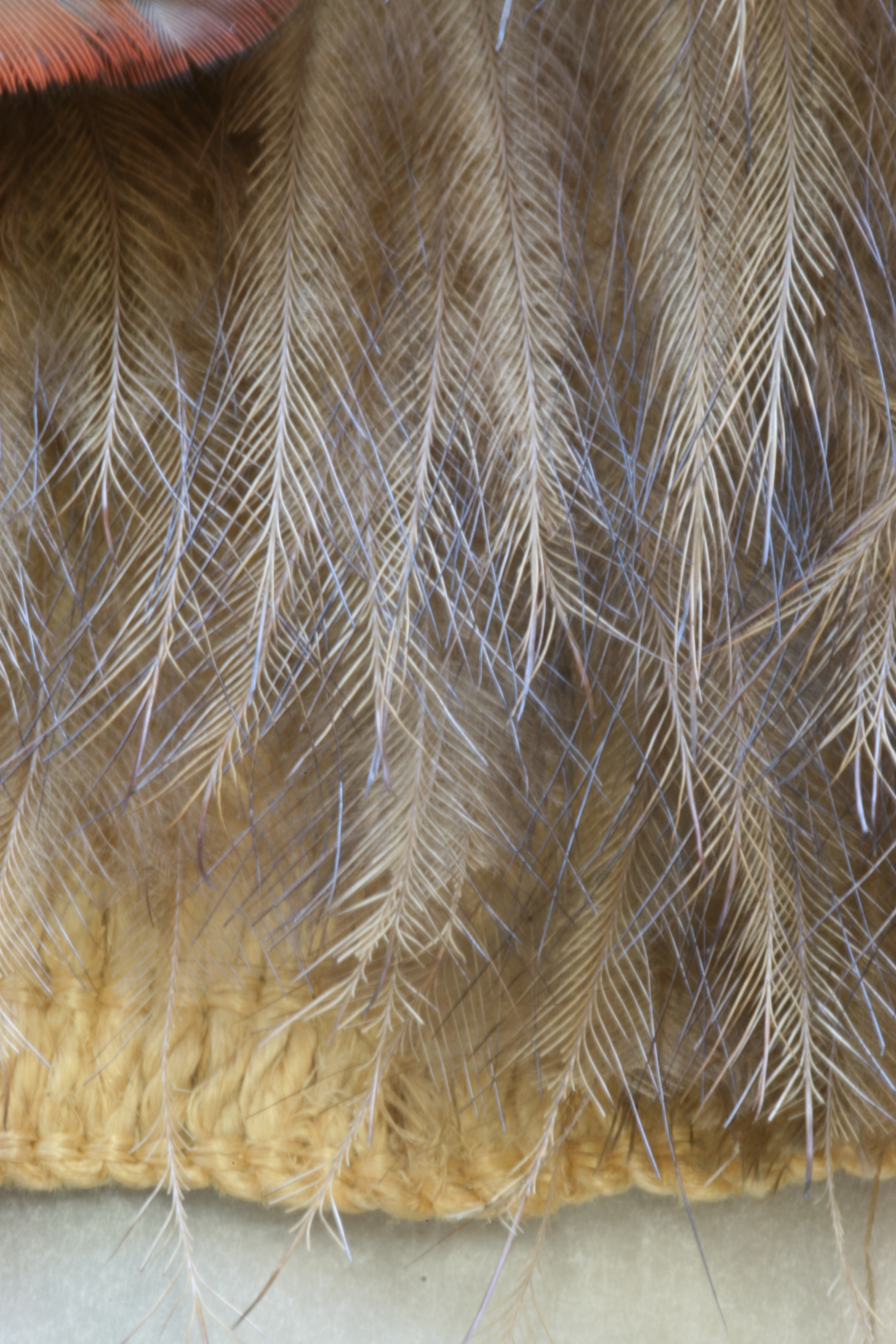
Detail of the bottom edge of a kahu kiwi, showing the distinctive hair-like nature of the kiwi feathers.

The Māori traditionally believed that kiwi were under the protection of Tāne Mahuta, god of the forest. They were used as food and their feathers were used for kahu kiwi—ceremonial cloaks. Today, while kiwi feathers are still used, they are gathered from birds that die naturally, through road accidents, or predation, and from captive birds. Kiwi are no longer hunted and some Māori consider themselves the birds' guardians.

=== Scientific documentation ===
In 1813, George Shaw named the genus Apteryx in his species description of the southern brown kiwi, which he called "the southern apteryx". Captain Andrew Barclay of the ship Providence provided Shaw with the specimen. Shaw's description was accompanied by two plates, engraved by Frederick Polydore Nodder; they were published in volume 24 of The Naturalist's Miscellany.

=== Zoos ===
In 1851, London Zoo became the first zoo to keep kiwi. The first captive breeding took place in 1945. As of 2007 only 13 zoos outside New Zealand hold kiwi. The Frankfurt Zoo has 12, the Berlin Zoo has seven, Walsrode Bird Park has one, the Avifauna Bird Park in the Netherlands has three, the San Diego Zoo has five, the San Diego Zoo Safari Park has one, the National Zoo in Washington, DC has eleven, the Smithsonian Conservation Biology Institute has one, and the Columbus Zoo and Aquarium has three.

In 2023, Zoo Miami apologised for mistreating a kiwi, after footage of visitors patting the nocturnal bird under bright lights caused outrage in New Zealand.

=== As a national symbol ===
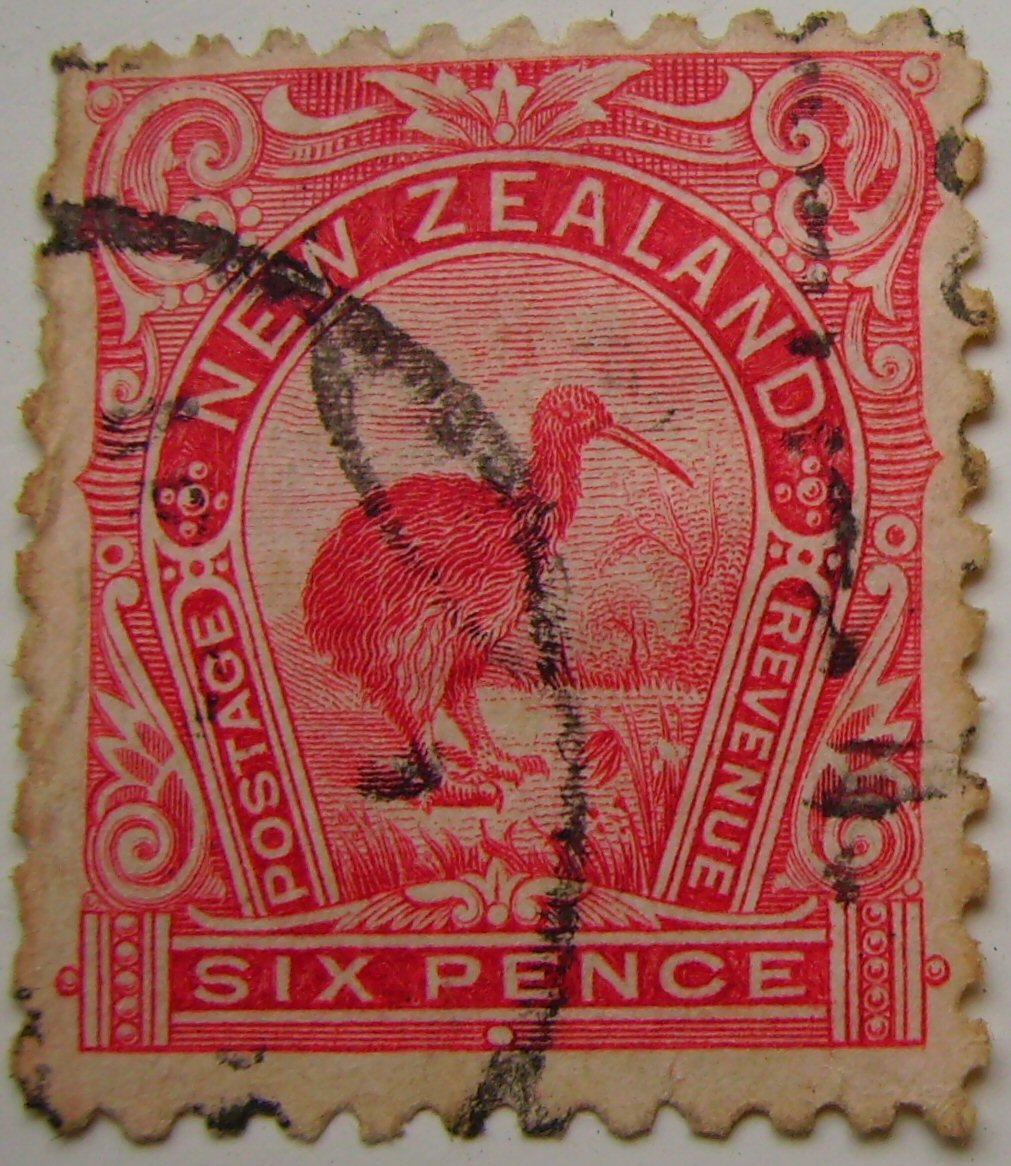
The kiwi on an 1898 New Zealand stamp

The kiwi as a symbol first appeared in the late 19th century in New Zealand regimental badges. It was later featured in the badges of the South Canterbury Battalion in 1886 and the Hastings Rifle Volunteers in 1887. Soon after, the kiwi appeared in many military badges; and in 1906, when Kiwi Shoe Polish was widely sold in the UK and the US, the symbol became more widely known.

During the First World War, the name "Kiwis" for New Zealand soldiers came into general use, and a giant kiwi (now known as the Bulford kiwi) was carved on the chalk hill above Sling Camp in England. Usage has become so widespread that all New Zealanders overseas and at home are now commonly referred to as "Kiwis".

The kiwi has since become the best-known national symbol for New Zealand, and the bird is prominent in the coat of arms, crests and badges of many New Zealand cities, clubs and organisations. At the national level, the red silhouette of a kiwi is in the centre of the roundel of the Royal New Zealand Air Force. The kiwi is featured in the logo of the New Zealand Rugby League, and the New Zealand national rugby league team are nicknamed the Kiwis.

A kiwi has featured on the reverse side of three New Zealand coins: the one florin (two-shilling) coin from 1933 to 1966, the twenty-cent coin from 1967 to 1990, and the one-dollar coin since 1991. In currency trading the New Zealand dollar is often referred to as "the kiwi".

=== In popular culture ===
A song, "Sticky Beak the Kiwi", with words by Bob Edwards and music by Neil Roberts, was recorded in 1961, sung by Julie Nelson (aged 14) and accompanied by the Satins and the Don Bell Orchestra of Whangārei. A Christmas song, it portrays Sticky Beak as insisting on pulling Santa Claus's sleigh when distributing presents south of the equator.

"How the Kiwi Lost its Wings" is a fable written by broadcaster Alwyn Owen in 1963. It uses elements of Māori mythology, such as Tāne Mahuta, and the World War I symbol of cowardice, white feathers, in a pourquoi story explaining features of New Zealand birds. Owen portrays the kiwi as nobly sacrificing its wings and flight in order to protect the trees from depredation by ground-dwelling creatures, and thereby winning its unique renown. Owen's story is sometimes described as "A Maori Legend". It has been recorded as a children's story, published as a book, was made into an animated film in 1980, set to music for the Auckland Philharmonia Orchestra by Thomas Goss as "Tāne and the Kiwi" in 2002 (recorded for RNZ by Orchestra Wellington in 2008), and performed as a ballet by the Royal New Zealand Ballet in 2022.

== See also ==
- Wildlife of New Zealand
- Birds of New Zealand
- Conservation in New Zealand
