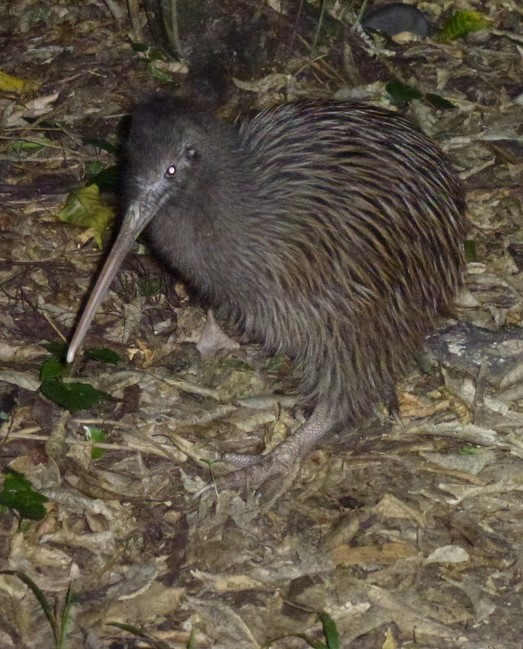
- Adult Okarito kiwi

Conservation status
- Vulnerable (IUCN 3.1)

Scientific classification
- Kingdom: Animalia
- Phylum: Chordata
- Class: Aves
- Infraclass: Palaeognathae
- Order: Apterygiformes
- Family: Apterygidae
- Genus: Apteryx
- Species: A. rowi

Binomial name
- Apteryx rowi Tennyson et al., 2003
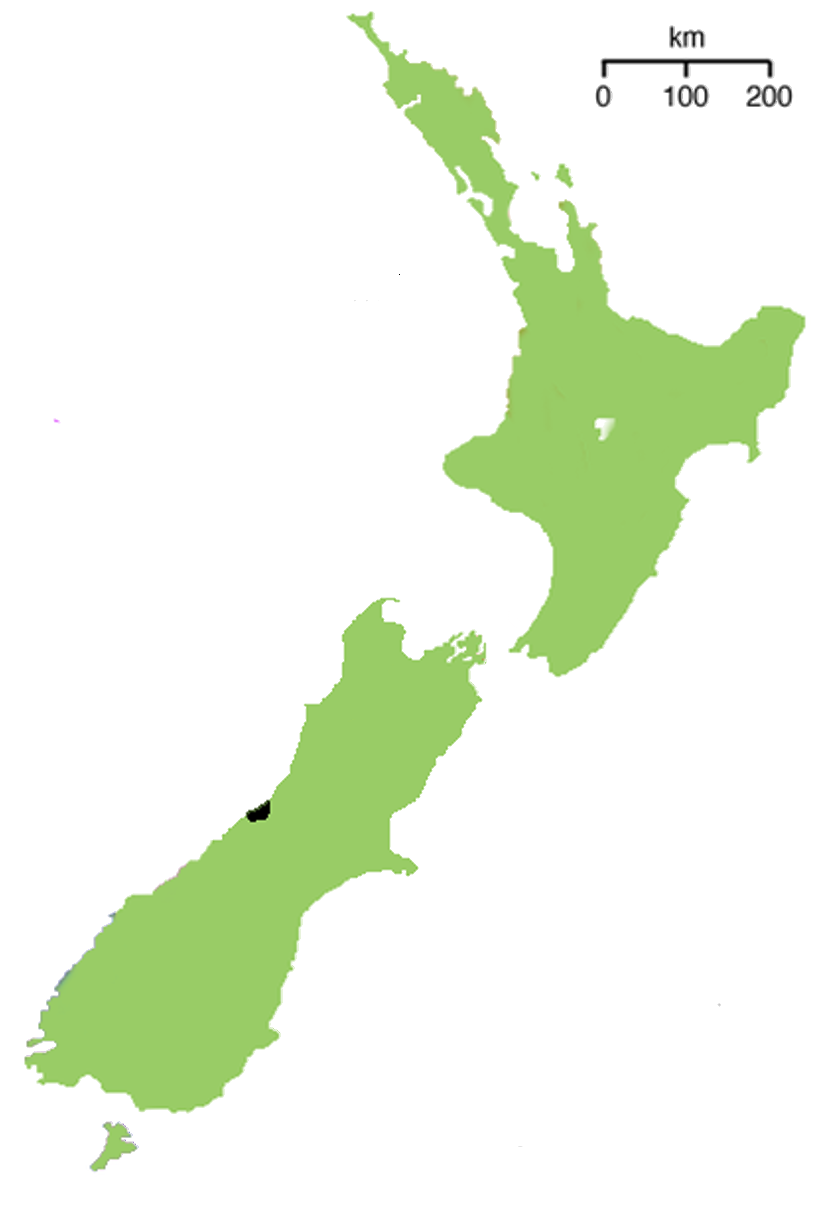

Synonyms
- Apteryx "Okarito"; Apteryx Okarito brown; Apteryx mantelli 'Okarito'; Apteryx mantelli Okarito; Apteryx mantelli Okarito brown kiwi; Apteryx rowi Burbidge et al., 2003 nomen nudum; Apteryx rowii Marsh, 2003 nomen nudum

= Okarito kiwi =

Species of flightless bird

The Okarito kiwi (Apteryx rowi), also known as Rowi or Okarito brown kiwi, is a member of the kiwi family Apterygidae, described as new to science in 2003. The species is part of the brown kiwi complex, and is morphologically very similar to other members of that complex. It is found in a restricted area of the Ōkārito forest on the West Coast of New Zealand's South Island, and has a population of only about 600 birds.

== Taxonomy ==
The Okarito kiwi is a monotypic species, i.e. there are no recognised subspecies. The genus name Apteryx stems from the Greek "without wings". Originally assumed to be the same species as the Southern brown kiwi A. australis, DNA testing shows that the possible split off from this species was 8.2 million years ago, and the split from their closest relatives, the Northern Island brown kiwi A. mantelli was around 6.2 million years ago. This bird is a ratite and has similarities to the others (emu, ostrich, rhea, cassowary). Its sternum has no keel, its wings are minimal, and it has no preen gland. Its palate is also distinctive, and its feathers have no barbules or aftershaft. Other features that are similar to only the other kiwi is a weak gizzard and no tail, only a pygostyle.

The taxonomic status of the Okarito Forest population of kiwi has been debated since the 1950s, first by Brian Reid and Colin Roderick of the New Zealand Wildlife Service, who claimed the population was distinct from the kiwi found in Fiordland. The presence of a distinct kiwi led to the southern Okarito Forest becoming a protected area in the 1970s, and later being integrated into Westland Tai Poutini National Park. Recognition of the Okarito kiwi being a separate taxon slowly gained recognition since the early 1990s. Indications that the population was a distinct species included DNA evidence undertaken by Allan J. Baker in 1995 showing great variation in the genetics of kiwi populations, and the discovery of Apterygon okarito, a louse that exclusively uses the Okarito kiwi as a host. The species was first formally described in 2003.

A 2016 study conducted phylogenetic and population genetic analyses of the genus Apteryx. A Bayesian phylogeny using 1,710 base pairs of mtDNA for 203 individuals (including Holocene-aged fossil kiwi) showed that all five recognized species of kiwi are reciprocally monophyletic. The phylogeny also showed extensive differentiation between extant populations within A. australis and A. mantelli as well as fossil populations in A. australis, A. owenii and A. rowi. The researchers generated the following species tree of the five recognized species of kiwi in two clades (spotted and brown) with all divergence events having occurred within the last 8 million years.

- Apteryx (3.85 mya)
  - (0.55 mya)
    - Apteryx owenii
    - Apteryx maxima
  - (1.56 mya)
    - - (1.12 mya)
        - Apteryx mantelli
        - Apteryx rowi
    - Apteryx australis

== Description ==
This species is a medium-sized kiwi measuring around 55 cm (22 in) in length. It is sexually dimorphic, with females being larger than males and having longer beaks. The weight of the male ranges from 1.57 to 2.25 kg (3.5 to 5.0 lb), and the female weighs 1.95–3.97 kg (4.3–8.8 lb).

== Range and habitat ==
The Okarito brown kiwi lives in the Okarito forest on the West Coast of New Zealand's South Island.

On 29 June 2010, three breeding pairs were released onto Blumine Island as part of a breeding programme. In 2012, twenty rowi were released on Mana Island. A new population was established in the Omoeroa Ranges near Fox Glacier in late 2018. In 2021 signs of rowi were detected in Ballyhooly Bush, remnant mataī forest on the Lower Whataroa River flats, 24 km from Ōkārito forest.

== Reproduction ==
The female can lay up to three eggs, each in a different nest. Both the male and the female incubate the eggs. The egg is very large, as it weighs 20% of the female's weight (as in all kiwi). The eggs incubate for 75–85 days. Most pairs are monogamous throughout their lives.

== Status and conservation ==
The Okarito kiwi is currently classified as Vulnerable by the IUCN due to habitat loss and predation by introduced stoats. Conservation efforts such as Operation Nest Egg and the stoat control regime have been partially successful in restoring the rowi population. However, the rowi is still in a fragile stage of existence. Predation, mainly from imported animals such as stoats, is still the biggest threat to the rowi. The South Okarito Forest was designated a kiwi sanctuary in 2000.

The West Coast Wildlife Centre in Franz Josef village operates a conservation programme as part of Operation Nest Egg. Eggs at risk of predation are removed, the chicks hatched in captivity, raised in a natural predator-free environment until old enough to fend for themselves, and then returned to the wild. The operation opened in 2010 and has been responsible for raising the wild population of rowi from just 165 ageing adults in the 1990s to 600 as of 2019. Surveys have ensured that there is no noticeable difference in behaviour between such birds and rowi growing up fully in the wild. The Wildlife Centre is the only place in New Zealand where one can see rowi in a nocturnal walkthrough area.

== Gallery ==
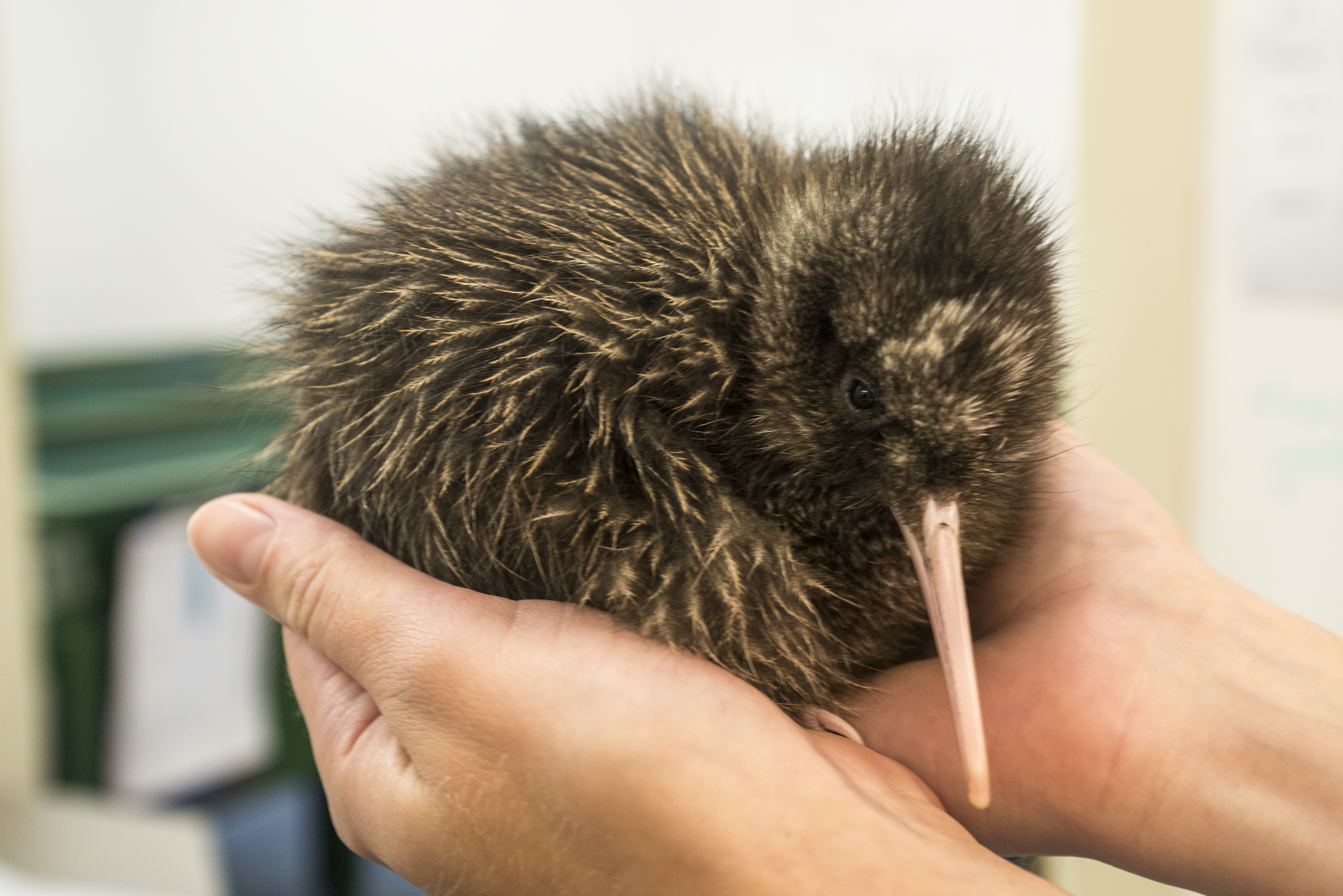
The West Coast Wildlife Centre, at Franz Josef, is part of Project Nest Egg, breeding rowi.

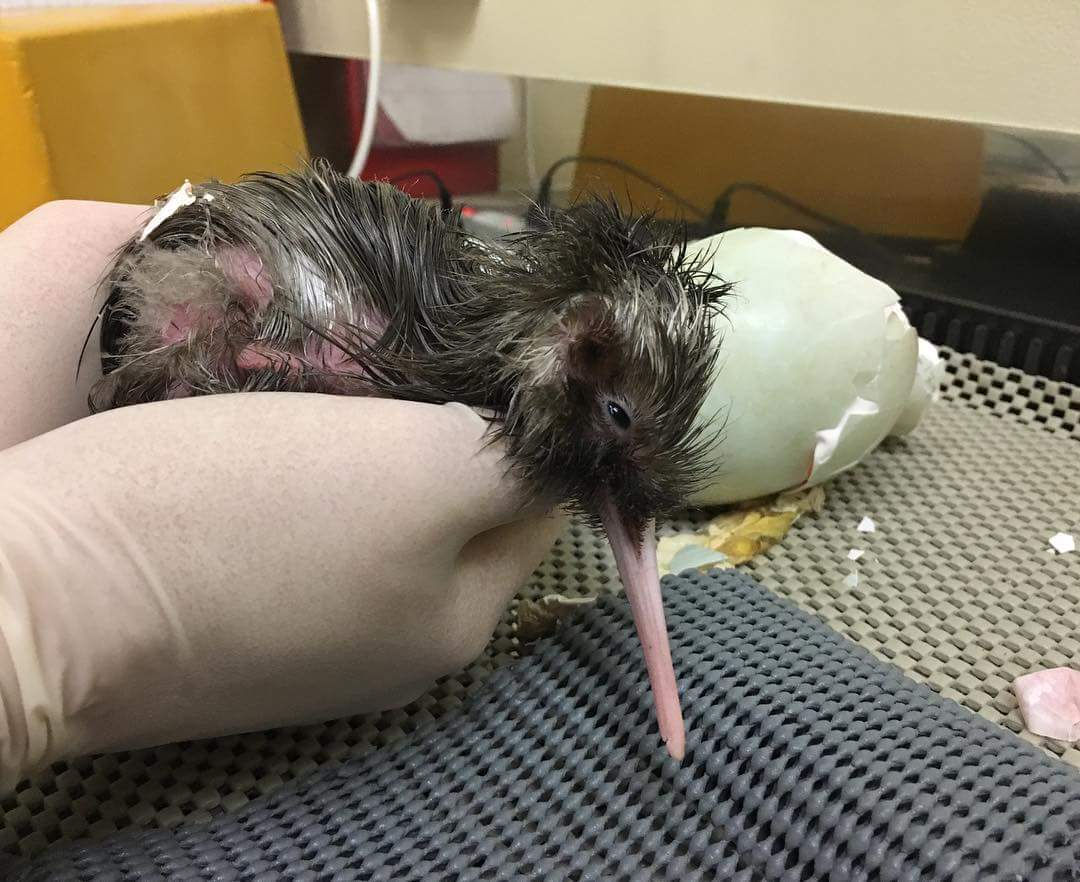
Newly hatched chick

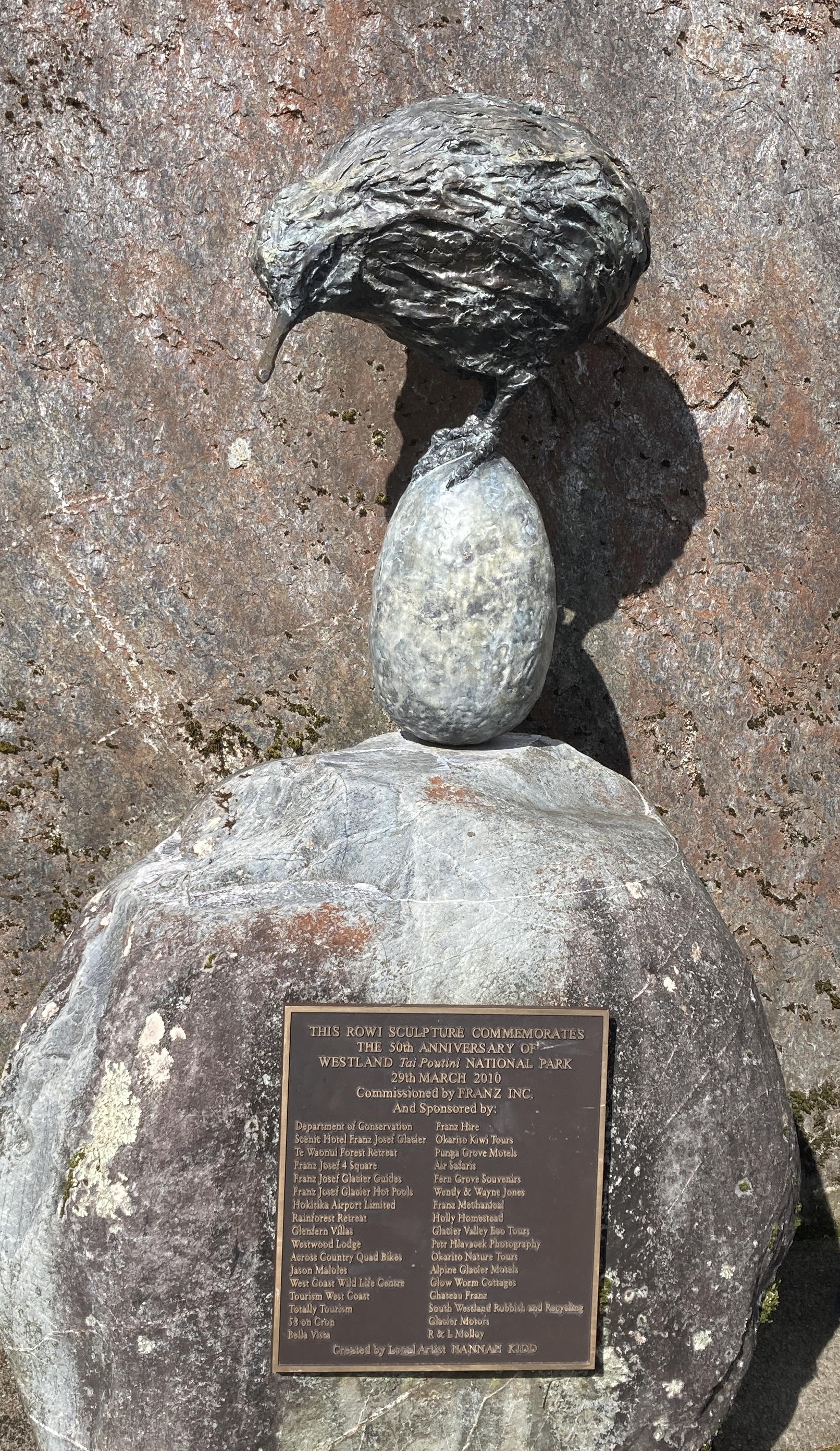
Sculpture in the Westland Tai Poutini National Park

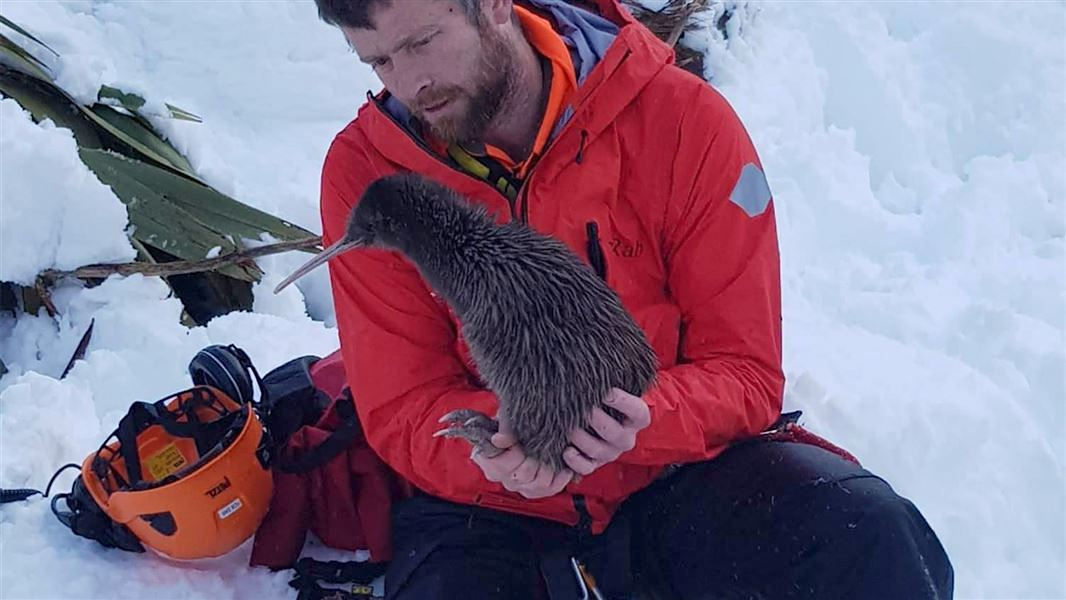
An Okarito kiwi named Aroha, during a rescue operation

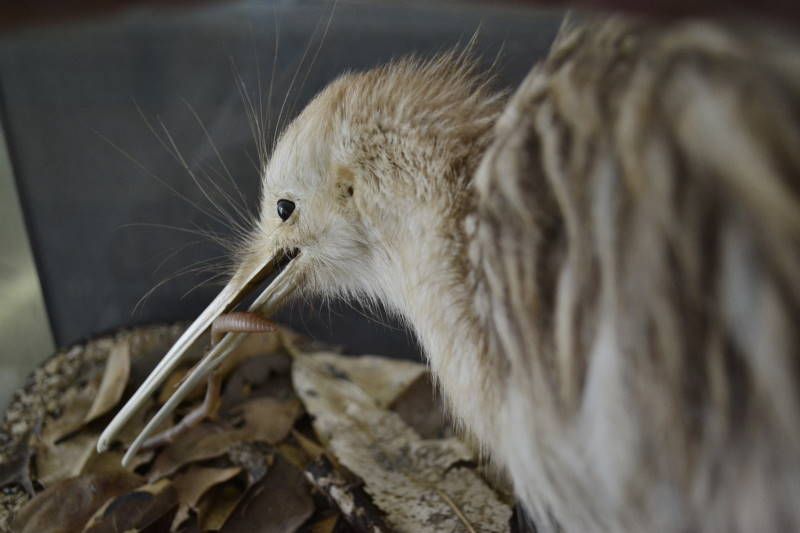
Taxidermy Okarito kiwi at the Auckland Zoo

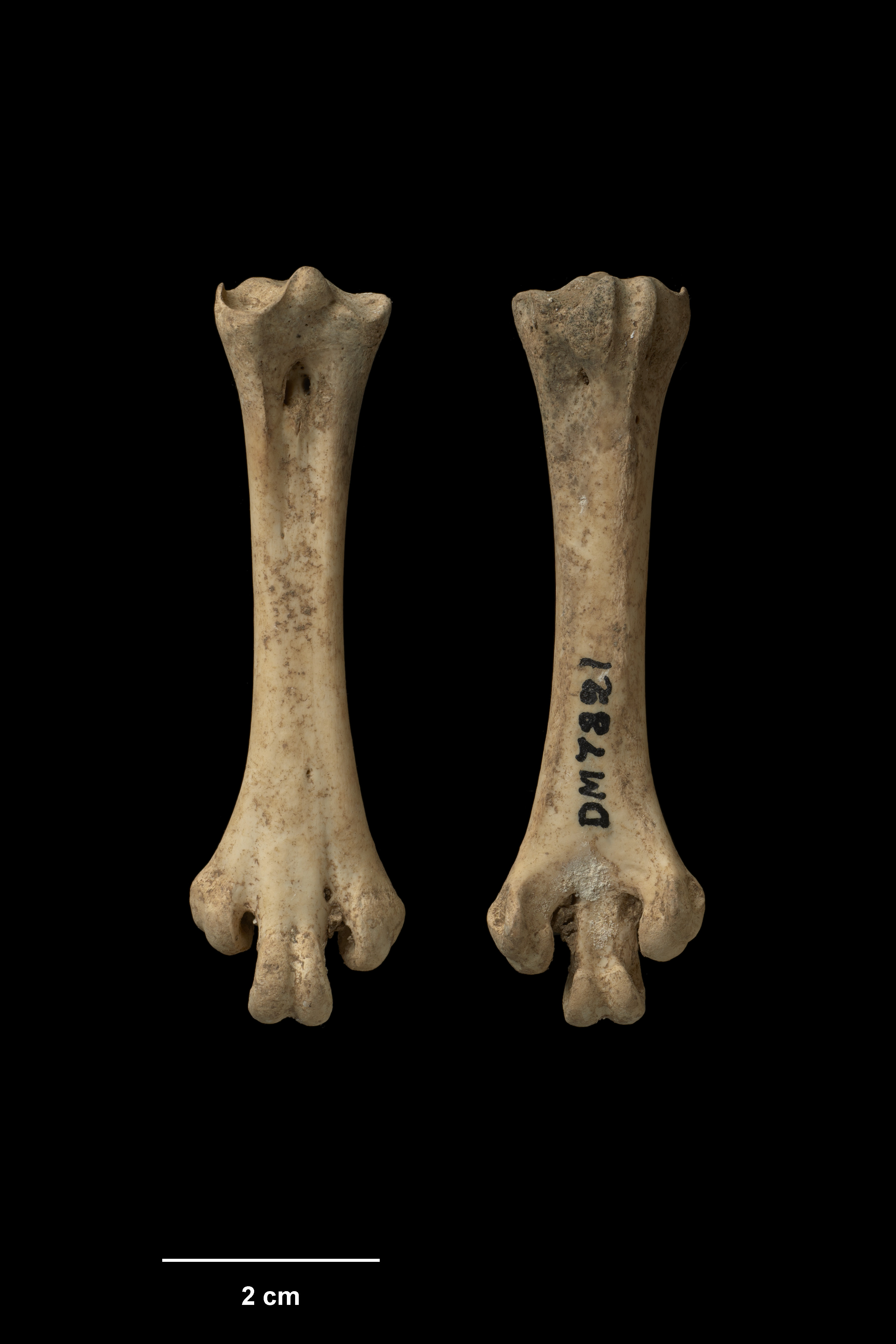
Bones of A. rowi, found in Martinborough

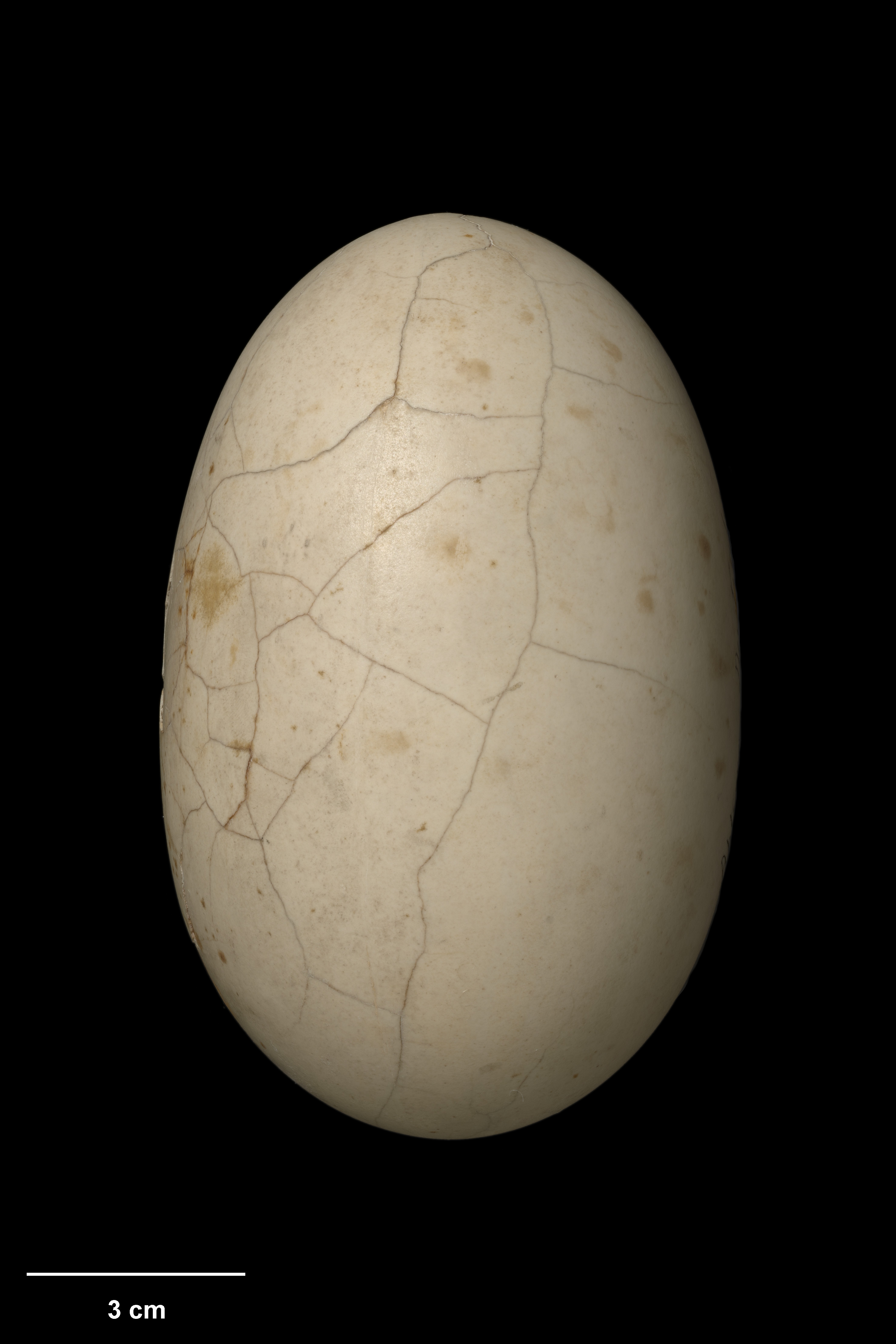
Egg of A. rowi
