= BEND2 =

Protein-coding gene in humans

Identifiers
- Aliases: BEND2, CXorf20, BEN domain containing 2
- External IDs: GeneCards: BEND2

Gene location (Human)
Chr.	X chromosome (human)
Band	Xp22.13	Start	18,162,931 bp
Band	Xp22.13	End	18,220,886 bp
RNA expression pattern
Bgee	Human / Mouse (ortholog); Top expressed in: monocyte; testicle; gonad; blood; right testis; left testis; granulocyte; lower lobe of lung; trabecular bone; bone marrow / n/a; More reference expression data
BioGPS	n/a
Orthologs
Databases	NCBI: entry; OMA: entry
Species	Human	Mouse
Entrez	139105	n/a
Ensembl	ENSG00000177324	n/a
UniProt	Q8NDZ0	n/a
RefSeq (mRNA)	NM_001184767; NM_153346	n/a
RefSeq (protein)	NP_001171696; NP_699177	n/a
Location (UCSC)	Chr X: 18.16 – 18.22 Mb	n/a
PubMed search		n/a
- Wikidata
View/Edit Human

BEND2 is a protein that in humans is encoded by the BEND2 gene. It is also found in other vertebrates, including mammals, birds, and reptiles. The expression of BEND2 in Homo sapiens is regulated and occurs at high levels in the skeletal muscle tissue of the male testis and in the bone marrow. The presence of the BEN domains in the BEND2 protein indicates that this protein may be involved in chromatin modification and regulation.

== Gene ==
=== Common aliases ===
BEND2 stands for BEN domain containing 2 and is also known as CXorf20 (HGNC ID: 28509).

=== Locus and size ===
The locus for BEND2 is on the minus strand of the X chromosome at Xp22.13. The gene is approximately 58 kilobases in length.

== mRNA ==
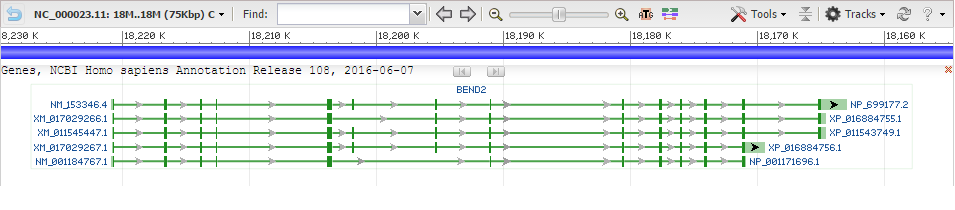
A screenshot of the NCBI Gene page for BEND2 showing alternative splicing of the BEND2 mRNA transcript. Both exons (dark rectangles) and introns are shown.

=== Alternative splicing ===
BEND2 contains 14 exons which undergo alternative splicing to create five transcript variants that vary from 4,720 base pairs (bp) to 2,144 bp in the mature mRNA. The longest and most complete transcript of the gene, variant 1, encodes isoform 1 of the BEND2 protein (NP_699177.2).

=== 5' and 3'UTR ===
The untranslated regions (UTR) flanking the coding sequence of BEND2 at the 5' and 3' end of the mature mRNA molecule contain sites for RNA-binding proteins, including RBMX, pum2, and EIF4B as well as microRNA binding sites. The 5'UTR also contains an upstream in-frame stop codon and the 3'UTR contains a polyadenylation signal sequence.

== Protein (isoform 1) ==
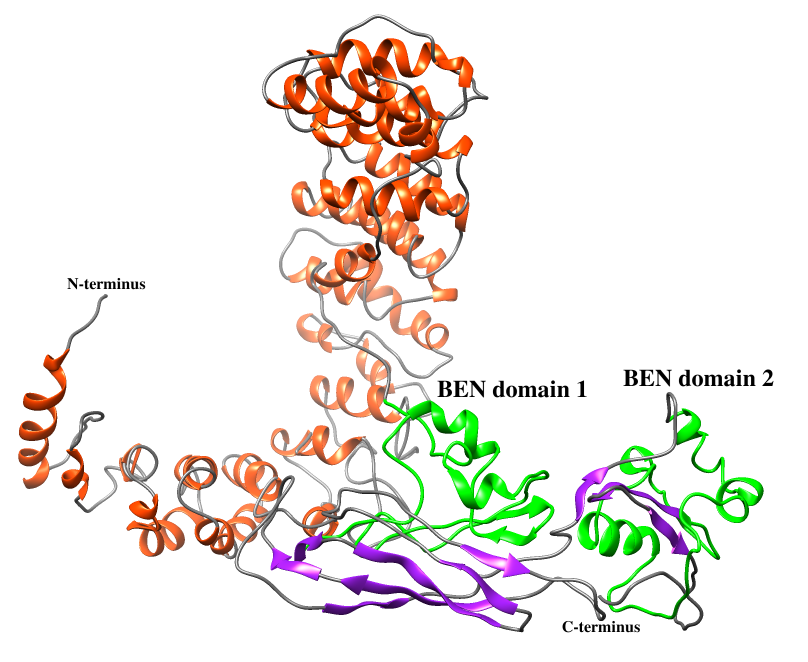
Annotated image of the tertiary and secondary structure of BEND2 based on I-TASSER prediction.

=== Molecular weight and internal composition ===
The predicted molecular weight is 87.9 kDal.

The predicted isoelectric point is pH 5.07.

The internal composition is enriched for serine residues.

=== Isoforms ===
Corresponding to the five alternative transcripts of BEND2, the protein encoded by this gene is found in two isoforms (1 and 2) as well as three predicted structures (X1, X2, and X3). These isoforms range from 813 to 645 amino acids in length. Isoform 1 is 799 amino acids in length.

=== Subcellular location ===
The presence of nuclear localization signals within the amino acid sequence or primary structure of the BEND2 protein leads to a prediction of subcellular localization in the nucleus. The pat7 [(P-X(1-3)-(3-4K/R)] signal and a nuclear bipartite signal are both found near the N-terminus of the protein.

Post-translational modifications of BEND2. Grey diamonds indicate glycation and red diamonds show SUMOlation sites. N-terminus acetylation and SUMO interactions sites are marked at the front of the protein. Two nuclear localization signals at the same site near a domain of unknown function (Unk).

=== Structure ===
The secondary structure for BEND2 is unclear, in particular at the N-terminus, which is poorly conserved between orthologs. The C-terminus contains two BEN domains, which are predicted to form a series of alpha helices.

=== Post-translational modifications ===
Based on its primary structure, BEND2 is predicted to undergo N-terminus acetylation, glycation of several lysine residues, SUMOlation, a SUMO interaction at the N-terminus, S-palmitoylation, and extensive phosphorylation.

=== Interacting proteins ===
BEND2 is found to interact with the following proteins through experimental yeast two-hybrid screens or pull down assays.

Experiment type	Protein	Protein Function	Associated diseases
Two-hybrid screen	Ataxin 1(ATXN1)	Chromatin-binding factor; RNA metabolism	Spinocerebellar ataxia 1/spinocerebellar degeneration
Two-hybrid screen	Splicing factor 3A subunit 2(SF3A2)	Activation of U2 snRNP; microtubule-binding protein	
Two-hybrid screen	LIM Homeobox 2 (LHX2)	Transcriptional regulator for cell differentiation; sequence-specific DNA binding	Schizencephaly
Two-hybrid screen	Proline Rich 20D (PRR20D)	Unknown function	
Pull down assay	Amyolid precursor protein (APP)	Cell surface receptor in neurons; cleaved to form transcriptional activators	Cerebral amyloid angiopathy; Alzheimer's disease

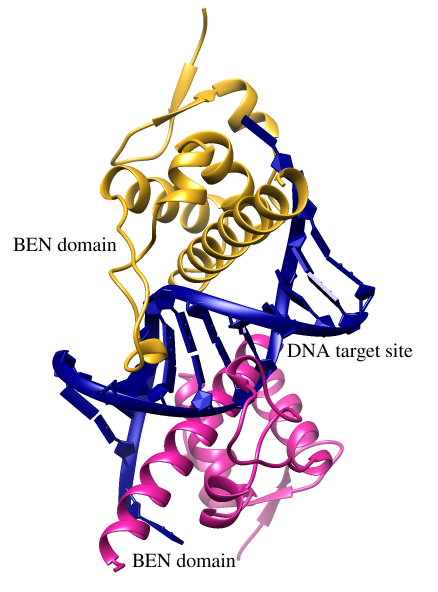
BEN domains of two D. melanogaster Insensitive proteins with their DNA target site.

== BEN domains (protein feature) ==
BEND2 has two BEN domains at its C-terminus. BEN domains are found in a diverse array of proteins and are predicted to be important for chromatin remodeling as well as for the recruitment of chromatin-modifying factors utilized during the process of transcriptional regulation of gene expression. BEN domains are predicted to form four alpha helices that allow this domain to interact with its DNA target.

Dai et al. 2013 showed that the Drosophila melanogaster Insensitive (Insv) gene and corresponding protein has no domains of known chemical function yet it contains a single BEN domain. They illustrated the activity of the Insv protein in transcriptional regulation of genes and obtained a crystal structure of two Insv BEN domains interacting with their DNA target site.

== Expression ==
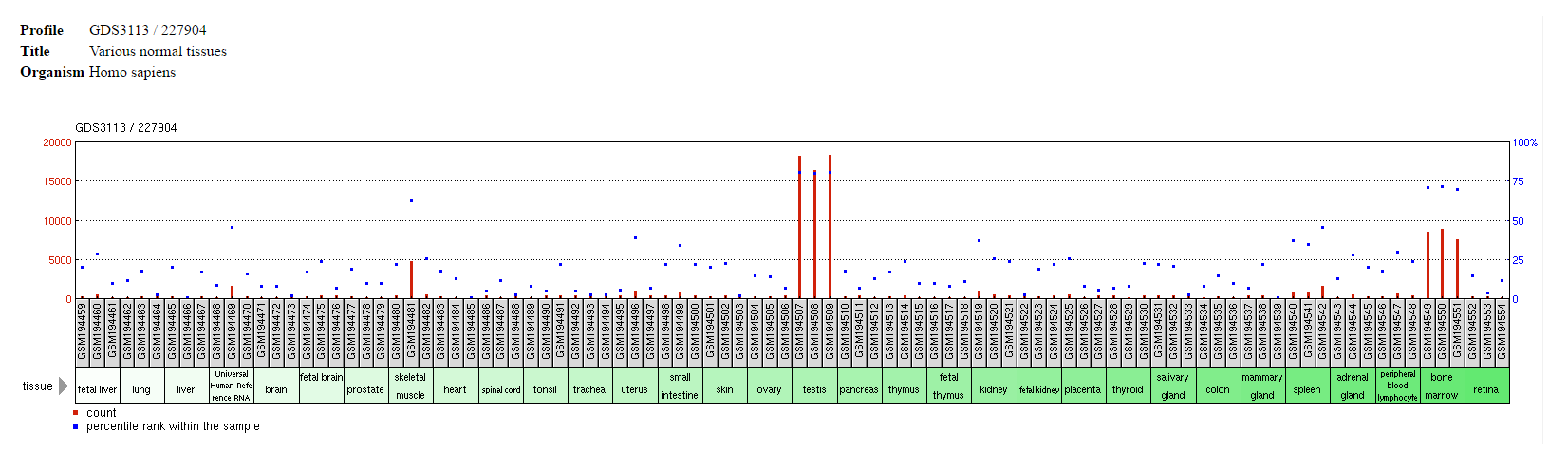
NCBI GEO Profile GDS3113 / 227904 showing tissue expression data for BEND2.

=== Tissue expression pattern ===
The expression of the BEND2 gene is regulated and it is therefore not ubiquitously expressed in the human body. High expression occurs in the testis and in the bone marrow. The NCBI EST profile for this gene shows expression only in the testis and in the muscle.

=== Transcriptional regulation of expression ===
The promoter regulating expression of BEND2 (GXP_2567556) is 1255 base pairs in length and is located directly upstream of the BEND2 gene. It regulates transcription of all five transcriptional variants of BEND2. Genomatix's MatInspector program predicted 418 transcription factor binding sites within the BEND2 promoter, including for SRY, neurogenin, interferon regulatory factor-3 (IRF-3), Ikaros2, and TCF/LEF-1.

== Homology ==
=== Paralogs ===
The BEND2 protein has no known paralogs within the human genome.

=== Ben-domain containing gene family ===
The BEND2 gene belongs to a family of human genes known as "BEN-domain containing”. This includes BANP (BEND1), BEND3, BEND4, BEND5, BEND6, BEND7, NACC1 (BEND8), and NACC2 (BEND9). The loci for these genes are spread throughout the human genome. Each of these genes contains between one and four BEN domains. Except for at these motifs, the genes of the BEN family do not have similar sequences.

=== Orthologs ===
The BEND2 gene is conserved across evolutionary time as it has 114 known orthologs in a wide range of vertebrate species including mammals, birds, crocodilia, and amphibians. The BEND2 protein has 42 known orthologs. The C-terminus of the protein, the location of its BEN domains, is highly conserved; however, the N-terminus is not well conserved, even within the order of Primates.

Genus/species	Common name	Order	Date of divergence from H. sapiens (mya)	Accession number	Sequence length	Whole sequence identity	C-terminus identity
Homo sapiens	Human	Primates	0	NP_699177.2	799	1.000	1.000
Pongo abelii	Orangutan	Primates	15.76	--	784	0.921	0.854
Macaca nemestrina	Southern pig-tailed macaque	Primates	29.44	XP_011733709.1	823	0.694	0.828
Vicugna pacos	Alpaca	Artiodactyla	96	XP_015106214.1	740	0.433	0.512
Ceratotherium simum simum	White rhinoceros	Perissodactyla	96	XP_014646569.1	864	0.412	0.527
Loxodonta africana	African bush elephant	Proboscidea	105	XP_010594135.1	829	0.382	0.489
Canis lupus familiaris	Dog	Carnivora	96	XP_013967473.1	900	0.362	0.445
Ailuropoda melanoleuca	Giant panada	Carnivora	96	XP_019665441.1	852	0.353	0.460
Rhinolophus sinicus	Chinese horseshoe bat	Chiroptera	96	XP_019610944.1	808	0.345	0.459
Dasypus novemcinctus	Nine-banded armadillo	Cingulata	105	XP_012377569.1	886	0.342	0.500
Trichechus manatus latirostris	Manatee	Sirenia	105	XP_012412857.1	950	0.335	0.475
Chrysochloris asiatica	Cape golden mole	Afrosoricida	105	XP_006835746.1	683	0.330	0.443
Oryctolagus cuniculus	European rabbit	Lagomorpha	90	XP_017205124.1	811	0.305	0.438
Monodelphis domestica	Gray short-tailed opossum	Didelphimorphia	159	XP_007500895.1	728	0.303	0.443
Ornithorhynchus anatinus	Platypus	Monotremata	177	XP_007668655.1	715	0.302	0.429
Gavialis gangeticus	Fish-eating crocodile	Crocodilia	312	XP_019380828.1	697	0.309	0.458
Chelonia mydas	Green sea turtle	Testudines	312	XP_007070584.1	749	0.297	0.453
Apteryx australis mantelli	North Island brown kiwi	Apterygiformes	312	XP_013807123.1	647	0.295	0.444
Columba livia	Rock dove	Columbiformes	312	XP_005509980.1	668	0.287	0.442
Pygoscelis adeliae	Adelie penguin	Sphenisciformes	312	XP_009323754.1	657	0.282	0.458
Nanorana parkeri	Tibet frog	Anura	352	XP_018417228.1	586	0.260	0.376

== Function ==
BEND2 is predicted to be a DNA-binding protein due to the presence of BEN domains at its C-terminus, a hypothesis supported by its localization to the nucleus, the transcription factors found in its promoter region, and the nature of the proteins it interacts with. Though the precise function of the BEND2 protein is not yet well understood by the scientific community, BEN domains have been found to be important regulators of transcription.

== Clinical significance ==
The diseases that have been linked to BEND2 are related to the central nervous system though expression of the gene is not highly observed in these tissues.

- BEND2 was identified as one of the genes that causes a central nervous system primitive neuroectodermal tumor when fused with the MN1 gene, which is located on chromosome 22.
- A rare primary central nervous system lymphoma tumor was found to have a high mutation ratio for BEND2; however, the authors do not describe this gene as primarily responsible for the tumor.
- A young girl diagnosed with severe epileptic encephalopathy was found to have a 300-kb deletion in a region that included BEND2, an extremely rare mutation not found in her parents’ genomes.
- An individual with adult autism was identified to have a copy-number variant of unknown significance in a region only containing BEND2.
