= BEN domain =

BEN

Identifiers
- Symbol: BEN
- Pfam: PF10523
- InterPro: IPR018379
Available protein structures:
- PDB: IPR018379 PF10523 (ECOD; PDBsum)
- AlphaFold: IPR018379; PF10523

In molecular biology, BEN domain is a conserved protein domain found in a variety of eukaryotic transcriptional regulators and chromatin-associated proteins. It is named after three proteins in which it was first identified: BANP, E5R, and NAC1. The BEN domain is thought to play a critical role in protein-DNA and protein-protein interactions, particularly in gene silencing, transcriptional regulation, and chromatin organization. It is commonly involved in processes such as development, differentiation, and the maintenance of cellular identity through epigenetic regulation.

== Structure ==
This domain is predicted to form an all-alpha fold with four conserved helices. Its conservation pattern revealed several conserved residues, most of which have hydrophobic side-chains and are likely to stabilize the fold through helix-helix packing. First human BEN domain (BEND3)structure is solved together with TPR (ERCC6L)domain and Stimulates the ERCC6L translocase and ATPase activities.

== Function ==
The BEN domain is predicted to function as an adaptor for the higher-order structuring of chromatin, and recruitment of chromatin modifying factors in transcriptional regulation. It has been suggested to mediate protein-DNA and protein-protein interactions during chromatin organization and transcription. The presence of BEN domains in a poxviral early virosomal protein and in polydnaviral proteins also suggests a possible role in the organisation of viral DNA during replication or transcription. They are generally linked to other globular domains with functions related to transcriptional regulation and chromatin structure, such as BTB, C4DM, and C2H2 fingers.

== Examples ==
The BEN domain is found across the tree of life. In humans, it is found in 9 proteins: BANP, BEND2, BEND3, BEND4, BEND5, BEND6, BEND7, NACC1 (BEND8) and NACC2 (BEND9).

=== In humans ===
- SMAR1 (Scaffold/Matrix attachment region-binding protein 1; also known as BANP), a tumour-suppressor MAR-binding protein that down-regulates Cyclin D1 expression by recruiting HDAC1-mSin3A co-repressor complex at Cyclin D1 promoter locus; SMAR1 is the target of prostaglandin A2 (PGA2) induced growth arrest.
- NACC1, a novel member of the POZ/BTB (Pox virus and Zinc finger/Broad complex, Tramtrack and Bric-a-brac), but which varies from other proteins of this class in that it lacks the characteristic DNA-binding motif.
- BEND2, a protein of unknown function, that is predicted to be involved in chromatin modification and has been associated clinically with central nervous system disorders.

=== In other organisms ===
- Mod(mdg4) isoform C, the modifier of the mdg4 locus in Drosophila melanogaster (Fruit fly), where mdg4 encodes chromatin proteins which are involved in position effect variegation, establishment of chromatin boundaries, nerve path finding, meiotic chromosome pairing and apoptosis. Trans-splicing of Mod(mdg4) produces at least 26 transcripts.
- E5R protein from Chordopoxvirus virosomes, which is found in cytoplasmic sites of viral DNA replication.
- Several proteins of polydnaviruses.
