= SPMIP2 =

Human protein

Identifiers
- Aliases: SPMIP2, chromosome 4 open reading frame 45, C4orf45, Sperm Microtubule Inner Protein 2
- External IDs: MGI: 4936993; GeneCards: SPMIP2

Gene location (Human)
Chr.	Chromosome 4 (human)
Band	4q32.1	Start	158,893,134 bp
Band	4q32.1	End	159,038,760 bp

Gene location (Mouse)
Chr.	Chromosome 3 (mouse)
Band	3|3 E3	Start	79,243,968 bp
Band	3|3 E3	End	79,371,436 bp
RNA expression pattern
Bgee	Human / Mouse (ortholog); Top expressed in: sperm; testicle; left testis; right testis; secondary oocyte; ventricular zone; tibial nerve; monocyte; muscle of thigh; prefrontal cortex / Top expressed in: testicle; spermatid; spermatocyte; embryo; embryo; secondary oocyte; zygote; granulocyte; primary oocyte; islet of Langerhans; More reference expression data
BioGPS	n/a
Orthologs
Databases	NCBI: entry; OMA: entry
Species	Human	Mouse
Entrez	152940	100233207
Ensembl	ENSG00000164123	ENSMUSG00000091685
UniProt	Q96LM5	n/a
RefSeq (mRNA)	NM_152543	NM_001142953; NM_001370773
RefSeq (protein)	NP_689756	n/a
Location (UCSC)	Chr 4: 158.89 – 159.04 Mb	Chr 3: 79.24 – 79.37 Mb
PubMed search
- Wikidata
View/Edit Human	View/Edit Mouse

Protein SPMIP2 is a protein which in humans is encoded by the gene SPMIP2 (previously C4orf45). Not much has been reported about the function of this protein, but expression is primarily in the testis.

== Gene ==
The C4or45 gene is found on chromosome 4 (4q32.1) from 158,893,134 to 159,082,885, spanning 189,752 bases, and is oriented on the minus strand. The other names for this gene are FLJ25371 and LOC152940.

== mRNA ==
There are four total mRNA transcript variants of C4orf45. The most common C4orf45 mRNA transcript is 1263 nucleotides in length and contains 5 exons. The coding sequence spans from nucleotide 134 to 694. In RNA-seq datasets, C4orf45 has been observed to be ubiquitously expressed at low levels across all tissues, with greatest expression in the testes.

C4orf45 mRNA Transcript Variant Properties
Variant #	mRNA length (nt)	Protein length (aa)	MW (kDa)	# of Exons
1	1263	186	21.6	5
X1	1856	186	21.6	7
X3	1252	179	20.9	5
X4	1359	179	20.9	5

== Protein ==
The C4orf45 protein produced from the most common mRNA transcript is 186 amino acids in length. Its theoretical isoelectric point is 9.97 and its molecular weight is 21.6 kDa. The protein contains a domain of unknown function, DUF4562. It is also predicted to contain a forkhead-associated (FHA) domain and a SRC homology 3 (SH3) domain. According to the structural prediction from AlphaFold, the C4orf45 protein's tertiary structure consists primarily of alpha helices.

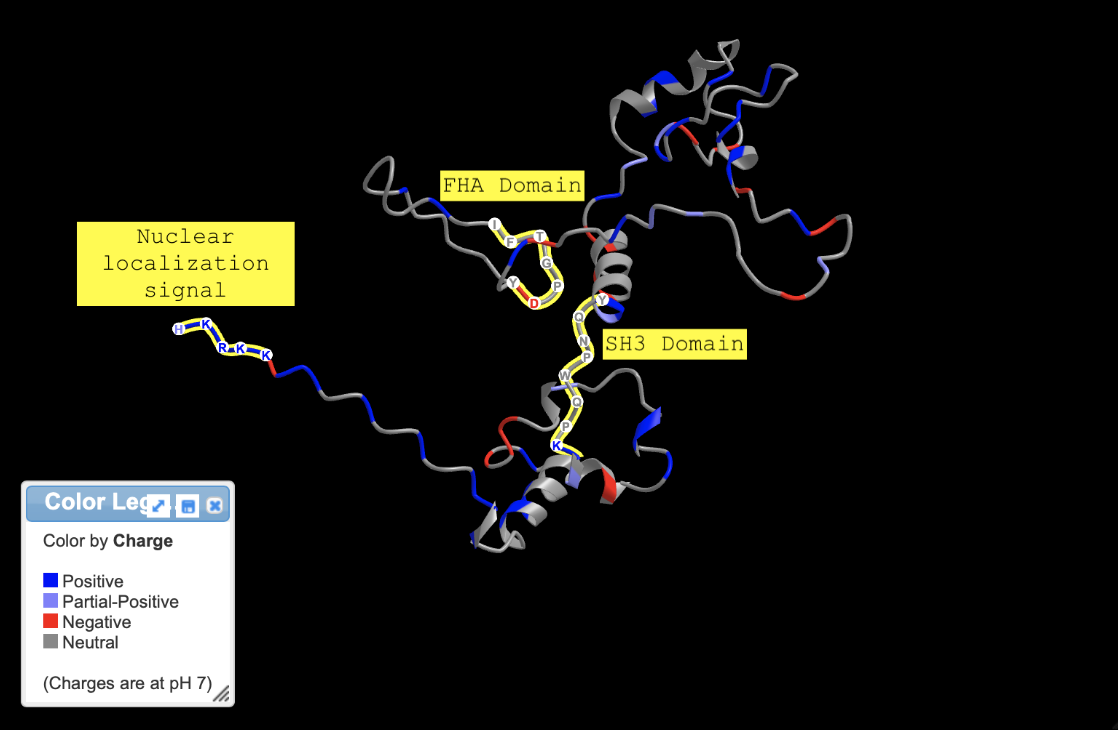
AlphaFold predicted tertiary structure of the human C4orf45 protein. Colors represent charge of amino acids. Annotations include predicted FHA domain, SH3 domain, and nuclear localization signal.

=== Sub-cellular localization ===
The human C4orf45 protein is predicted to contain a nuclear localization signal at its C-terminus, indicating it is a nuclear protein. The protein is also predicted to be found in the cytoplasm.

=== Post-translational modifications ===
The human C4orf45 protein is predicted to contain 4 phosphorylation sites. It is also predicted to contain two sumoylation sites, which are common in nuclear proteins and may aid in sub-cellular localization of the protein. C4orf45 is predicted to contain 8 O-linked beta-N-acetylglucosamine (O-β-GlcNA) attachment sites, which may play a role in regulating transcription, signaling, and protein-protein interactions of C4orf45. Five of the O-β-GlcNA attachment sites are also predicted to be phosphorylation sites. The C-terminus of the human C4orf45 protein is predicted to contain two acetylation sites.

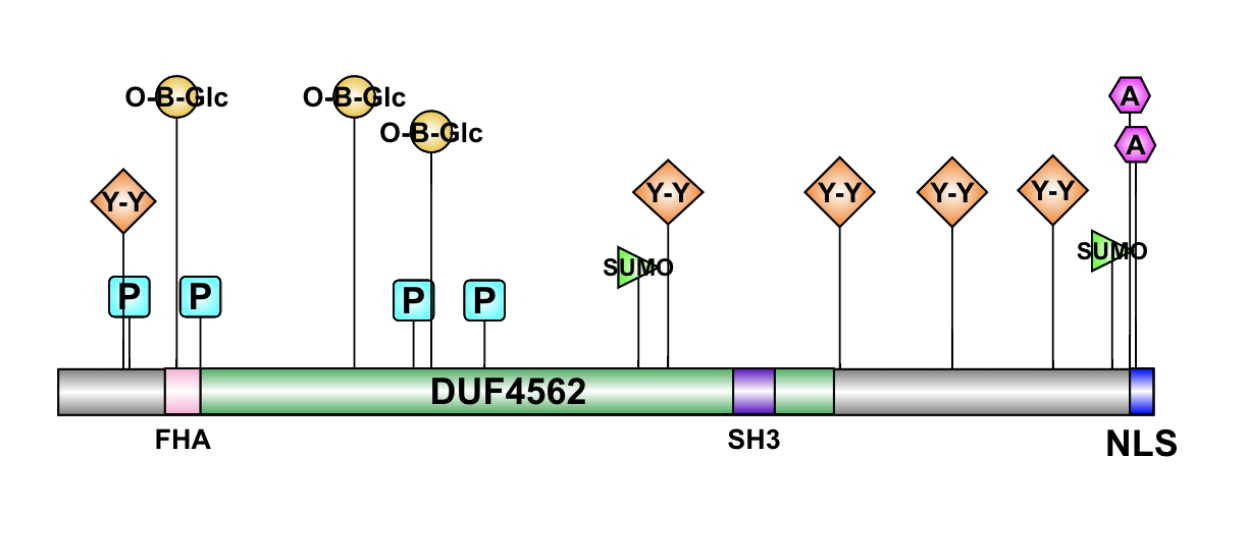
Schematic diagram of the human C4orf45 protein displaying predicted post-translational modifications and domains.

== Homology ==
=== Orthologs ===
Orthologs of C4orf45 are found in mammals, birds, amphibians, fish, and some invertebrates, but not in plants, fungi, or protists.

Ortholog Sequences of C4orf45 Protein in Humans
Genus and species	Common name	Taxonomic group	Estimated Date of Divergence (MYA)	Accession number	Sequence length (aa)	Sequence identity (%)	Sequence similarity (%)
Homo sapiens	Human	Primates	0	NP_689756.2	186	100	100
Mus musculus	House mouse	Rodentia	90	NP_001136425.1	189	67.1	76.6
Ailuropoda melanoleuca	Giant panda	Carnivora	94	XP_019657778.1	197	66.0	81.7
Crocodylus porosus	Saltwater crocodile	Reptilia	319	XP_019390090.1	182	43.8	54.9
Caretta caretta	Loggerhead sea turtle	Reptilia	319	XP_048703517.1	184	40.9	54.6
Gallus gallus	Chicken	Aves	319	XP_001233138.7	194	42.0	48
Cygnus atratus	Black swan	Aves	319	XP_050566334.1	204	37.8	46.3
Xenopus tropicalis	Western clawed frog	Amphibia	353	XP_002934787.1	183	41.1	47.6
Eleutherodactylus coqui	Common coqui	Amphibia	353	KAG9479981.1	122	44.3	35.2
Xenopus laevis	Common frog	Amphibia	353	XP_018086524.1	172	43.1	46.7
Latimeria chalumnae	West Indian Ocean coelacanth	Sarcocterygii	414	XP_014346686.1	203	40.0	40.7
Polyodon spathula	American paddlefish	Actinopterygii	431	XP_041119378.1	202	39.4	43.9
Salmo salar	Atlantic salmon	Actinopterygii	431	NP_001134722.1	160	37.9	41.7
Scyliorhinus canicula	Smaller spotted catshark	Chondrichthyes	464	XP_038648240.1	201	43.2	45.8
Branchiostoma lanceolatum	European lancelet	Leptocardii	556	CAH1247082.1	185	35.0	41.3
Phallusia mammillata	Tunicate	Ascidiae	603	CAB3227125.1	186	38.1	34.9
Anneissia japonica	Anneissia	Echinodermata	619	XP_033121347.1	208	35.2	32.2
Stylophora pistillata	Hood coral	Cnidaria	685	XP_022802728.1	206	40.7	41.6
Exaiptasia diaphana	Pale anemone	Cnidaria	685	KXJ18647.1	219	34.5	30.5
Pecten maximus	Great scallop	Mollusca	694	XP_033741332.1	214	32.7	39.7
Haliotis rubra	Blacklip abalone (sea snail)	Mollusca	694	XP_046577682.1	204	36.6	37.4

=== Evolution ===
C4orf45 seems to have first appeared in invertebrates. When comparing the date of divergence (MYA) versus corrected sequence divergence for C4orf45, cytochrome c, and fibrinogen alpha, it appears that C4orf45 is evolving at an intermediate rate compared to the fast evolving fibrinogen alpha and the slow evolving cytochrome c.

== Function ==
=== Interacting proteins ===
The human C4orf45 protein has been experimentally shown to interact with BANP (BTG3 associated nuclear protein) and PFDN5 (prefoldin subunit 5). It also interacts with NEK4 (NIMA related kinase 4), which is a serine/threonine protein kinase that is required for normal entry into replicative senescence.

== Clinical significance ==
C4orf45 had been identified as part of four different driver gene sets in the development of ovarian cancer. C4orf45 has also been identified in the development of multiple myeloma (MM). A study found a reciprocal translocation between a breakpoint in chromosome 8 downstream of the MYC gene and a breakpoint in chromosome 4 in the C4orf45 gene in a patient with MM. An intronic variant found in C4orf45 suggests that the gene may contain variants associated with the development of cardiovascular disease in Mexican Americans. A cross-trait meta analysis study found a SNP at the C4orf45 gene loci that is shared between late-onset Alzheimer's disease and snoring. Another study discovered that the C4orf45 gene was altered by a copy number variant (CNV) in each member of a family that was diagnosed with familial schizophrenia (SCZ), indicating the gene's possible involvement in SCZ.

Conceptual translation of human (Homo sapiens) C4orf45 transcript 1 and the protein it encodes using Bioline Six-Frame Translation Tool. The C4orf45 mRNA transcript 1 (NM 152543.3) and uncharacterized protein C4orf45 (NP 689756.2) amino acid sequence were used for the translation. mRNA annotations include exon boundaries, poly A signal, poly A site, and start and stop codons. Protein annotations include a domain of unknown function (DUF4562), FHA domain, SH3 domain, and a nuclear localization signal. Predicted phosphorylation, O-β-GlcNAc attachment, sumoylation, YinYang, and acetylation sites are also labeled. The alpha helices predicted by AlphaFold are underlined.
