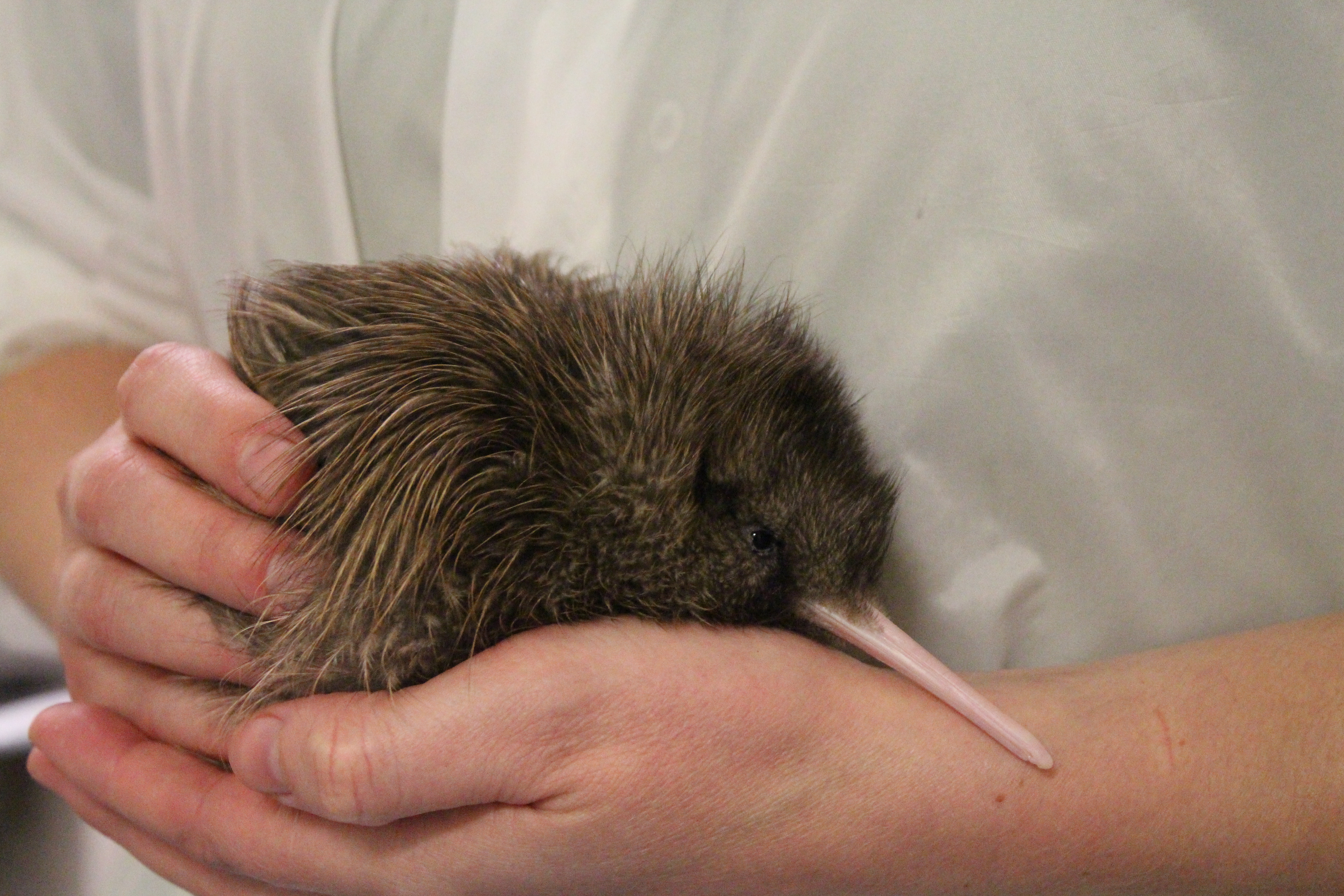

Conservation status
- Nationally Critical (NZ TCS)

Scientific classification
- Domain: Eukaryota
- Kingdom: Animalia
- Phylum: Chordata
- Class: Aves
- Infraclass: Palaeognathae
- Order: Apterygiformes
- Family: Apterygidae
- Genus: Apteryx
- Species: A. australis
- Population: 'Haast'

= Haast tokoeka =

'Haast'

Species of kiwi

The Haast tokoeka or Haast kiwi (Apteryx australis 'Haast') is a putative subspecies of the southern brown kiwi. It is one of the rarest kiwi in New Zealand. Like other kiwi, this bird is flightless.

== Morphology ==
This bird has red-brown feathers that resemble fur. It is flightless and has small wings and no tail. Its bill is long and narrow.

== Habitat and habits ==
The Haast tokoeka lives high in the mountains on the west side of New Zealand's South Island. About half of its habitat is in a protected area, the Haast Kiwi Sanctuary.

The adult Haast tokoeka live in pairs. They are territorial and fight other adult kiwis over good hunting and foraging ground. They are primarily nocturnal.

== Taxonomic status ==
Not all scientists concur that the Haast tokoeka is a separate subspecies from the Fiordland tokoeka. New Zealand Birds Online refers to the Haast tokoeka as "recognised as being distinct for management purposes" because of its genetic and bodily differences from the Fiordland tokoeka.

== Conservation ==
There are about 400 Haast tokoeka alive. Like other kiwi, the Haast tokoeka are threatened by habitat loss and invasive species, such as dogs, cats, and stoats.

In the Haast Kiwi Sanctuary, human beings place traps to catch stoats.

== Breeding ==
The kiwi make nests in a hollow logs, cracks in rocks, or space dug out of the ground. The egg is large and pale green in color. The male and female kiwi both incubate the egg.
