= DDX46 =

Protein-coding gene in the species Homo sapiens

Identifiers
- Aliases: DDX46, PRPF5, Prp5, DEAD-box helicase 46
- External IDs: OMIM: 617848; MGI: 1920895; GeneCards: DDX46
Enzyme activity
EC #	BRENDA	ExPASy	KEGG	MetaCyc
3.6.4.13	↗	↗	↗	↗

Gene location (Human)
Chr.	Chromosome 5 (human)
Band	5q31.1	Start	134,758,771 bp
Band	5q31.1	End	134,855,133 bp

Gene location (Mouse)
Chr.	Chromosome 13 (mouse)
Band	13|13 B1	Start	55,782,840 bp
Band	13|13 B1	End	55,829,069 bp
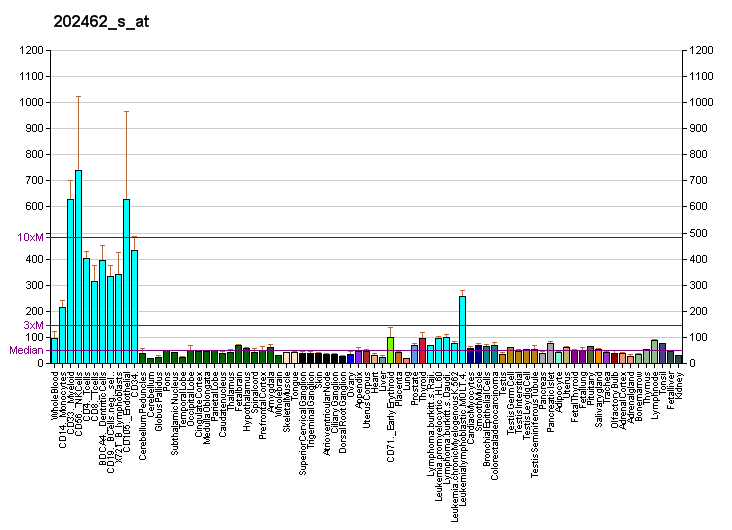
RNA expression pattern
Bgee	Human / Mouse (ortholog); Top expressed in: sural nerve; glutes; tibia; monocyte; tonsil; trabecular bone; endometrium; visceral pleura; triceps brachii muscle; epithelium of nasopharynx / Top expressed in: tail of embryo; genital tubercle; Paneth cell; ventricular zone; neural layer of retina; spermatocyte; vestibular membrane of cochlear duct; ascending aorta; aortic valve; primitive streak; More reference expression data
BioGPS	More reference expression data
Gene ontology
Molecular function	nucleotide binding; hydrolase activity; ATP binding; helicase activity; nucleic acid binding; RNA binding
Cellular component	Cajal body; membrane; nucleus; fibrillar center; nucleoplasm; nuclear speck; nucleolus; cytoplasm
Biological process	regulation of gene expression; mRNA processing; RNA secondary structure unwinding; RNA splicing; mRNA splicing, via spliceosome
Sources:Amigo / QuickGO
Orthologs
Databases	NCBI: entry; OMA: entry
Species	Human	Mouse
Entrez	9879	212880
Ensembl	ENSG00000145833	ENSMUSG00000021500
UniProt	Q7L014	Q569Z5
RefSeq (mRNA)	NM_001300860; NM_014829	NM_001282055; NM_145975
RefSeq (protein)	NP_001287789; NP_055644	NP_001268984
Location (UCSC)	Chr 5: 134.76 – 134.86 Mb	Chr 13: 55.78 – 55.83 Mb
PubMed search
- Wikidata
View/Edit Human	View/Edit Mouse

Probable ATP-dependent RNA helicase DDX46 is an enzyme that in humans is encoded by the DDX46 gene.

== Function ==
This gene encodes a member of the DEAD box protein family. DEAD box proteins, characterized by the conserved motif Asp-Glu-Ala-Asp (DEAD), are putative RNA helicases. They are implicated in a number of cellular processes involving alteration of RNA secondary structure, such as translation initiation, nuclear and mitochondrial splicing, and ribosome and spliceosome assembly. Based on their distribution patterns, some members of this family are believed to be involved in embryogenesis, spermatogenesis, and cellular growth and division. The protein encoded by this gene is a component of the 17S U2 snRNP complex; it plays an important role in pre-mRNA splicing.

== Interactions ==
DDX46 has been shown to interact with SF3A2.
