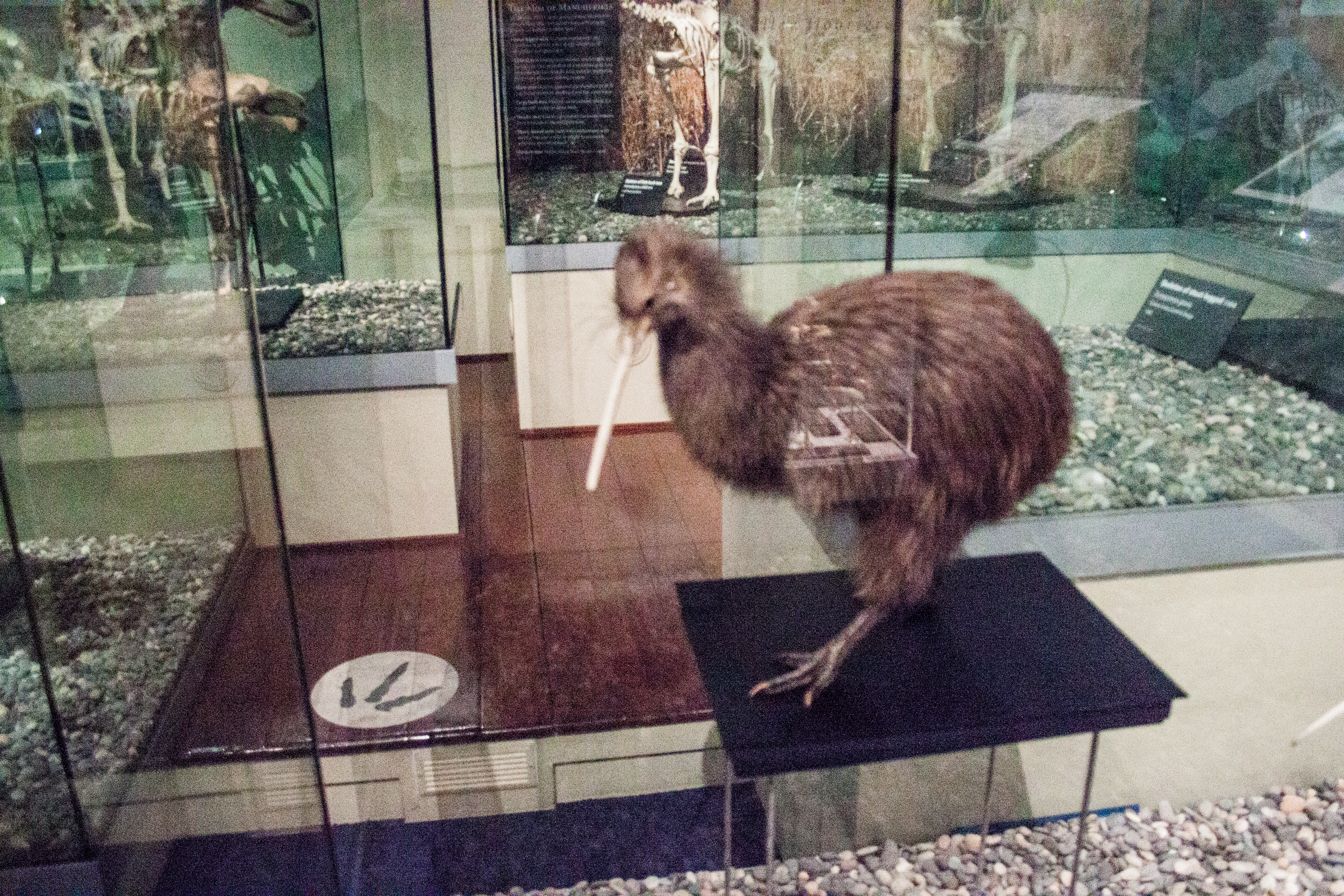

Conservation status
- Nationally Endangered (NZ TCS)

Scientific classification
- Kingdom: Animalia
- Phylum: Chordata
- Class: Aves
- Infraclass: Palaeognathae
- Order: Apterygiformes
- Family: Apterygidae
- Genus: Apteryx
- Species: A. australis
- Subspecies: A. a. lawryi

Trinomial name
- Apteryx australis lawryi Rothschild, 1893

= Stewart Island kiwi =

Subspecies of flightless bird

The Stewart Island tokoeka (Apteryx australis lawryi), also called the Stewart Island kiwi, the Rakiura tokoeka, or the Rakiura kiwi, is a subspecies of southern brown kiwi endemic to New Zealand. Like other ratites, it is a flightless bird.

== Appearance ==
The Stewart Island tokoeka is the largest type of southern brown kiwi. It has red-brown feathers that resemble fur. It has small wings and a long, curved bill. The nostrils are at the end of the bill, not at the top near the rest of its face. Experts think the kiwi can smell very well.

== Habitat and family ==
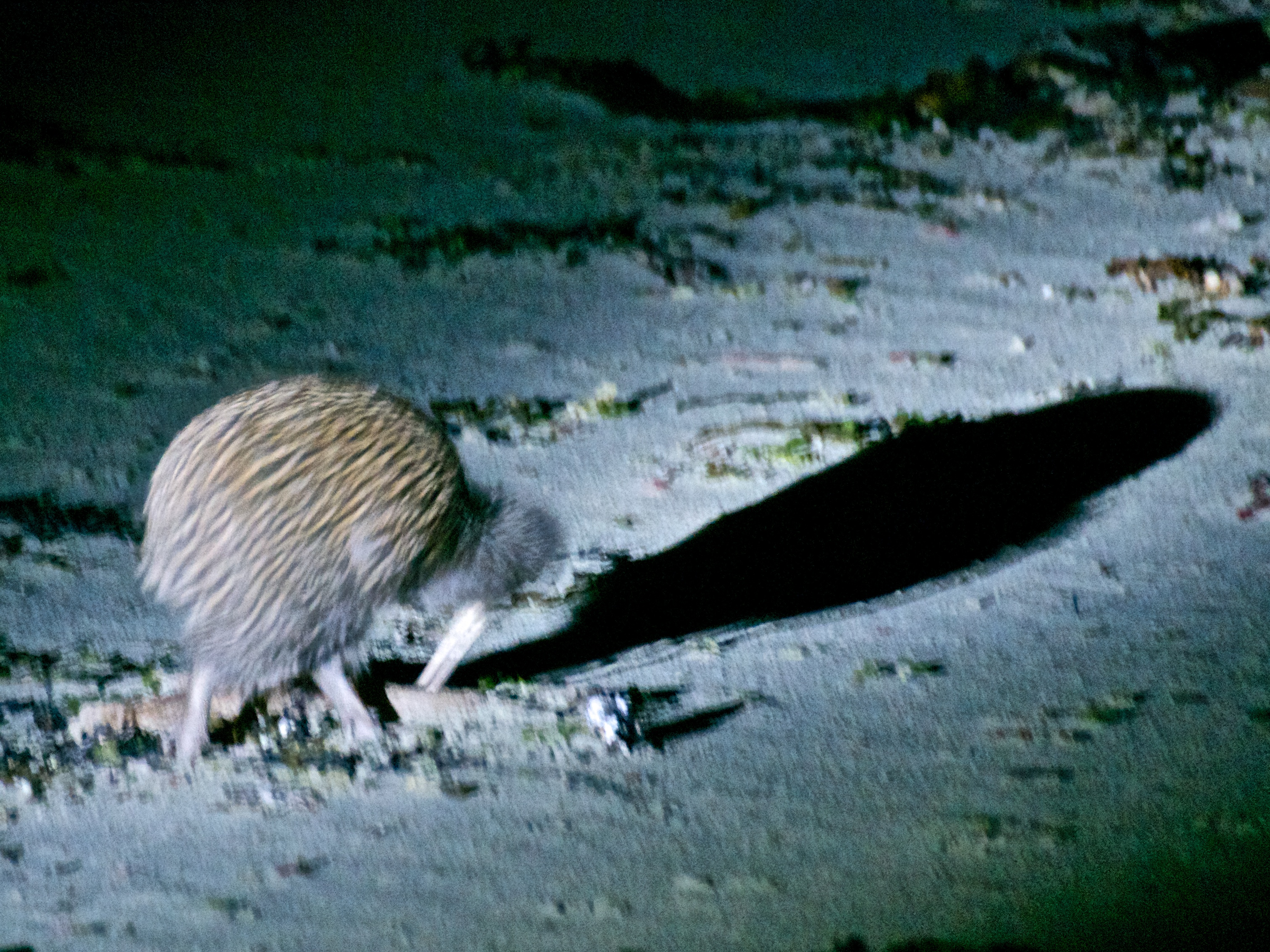
A Stewart Island kiwi on a beach.

About 20,000 Stewart Island tokoeka live on Stewart Island. Unlike other kiwis, they are diurnal rather than active only at night.

Unlike other kiwis, the Stewart Island tokoeka is not solitary, instead living in family groups. The chicks remain with their parents for up to seven years, during which they take turns incubating their parents' younger eggs. Scientists believe this assistance by older siblings may be why kiwi parents sometimes have two clutches each year. This kiwi also goes onto the beach to look for food, which most other kiwis do not do.

== Threats ==
Invasive mustelids, such as stoats, never established themselves on Stewart Island to the same extent as in the rest of New Zealand. However, there are feral cats on Stewart Island, and they can be very large.
