= BANP =

Protein-coding gene in the species Homo sapiens

Identifiers
- Aliases: BANP, BEND1, SMAR1, SMARBP1, BTG3 associated nuclear protein
- External IDs: OMIM: 611564; MGI: 1889023; HomoloGene: 9635; GeneCards: BANP; OMA:BANP - orthologs

Gene location (Human)
Chr.	Chromosome 16 (human)
Band	16q24.2	Start	87,949,244 bp
Band	16q24.2	End	88,077,318 bp

Gene location (Mouse)
Chr.	Chromosome 8 (mouse)
Band	8 E1|8 70.82 cM	Start	122,676,489 bp
Band	8 E1|8 70.82 cM	End	122,755,997 bp
RNA expression pattern
Bgee	Human / Mouse (ortholog); Top expressed in: oocyte; secondary oocyte; blood; pancreatic ductal cell; middle temporal gyrus; amniotic fluid; Brodmann area 23; tendon of biceps brachii; visceral pleura; tibia / Top expressed in: tail of embryo; genital tubercle; zygote; secondary oocyte; Ileal epithelium; granulocyte; primary oocyte; CA3 field; morula; yolk sac; More reference expression data
BioGPS	n/a
Gene ontology
Molecular function	DNA binding; p53 binding; protein binding; identical protein binding
Cellular component	nucleus; nucleoplasm; nuclear body
Biological process	protein localization to nucleus; multicellular organism development; positive regulation of transcription, DNA-templated; cell cycle; regulation of transcription, DNA-templated; transcription, DNA-templated; negative regulation of protein catabolic process; regulation of signal transduction by p53 class mediator; chromatin organization
Sources:Amigo / QuickGO
Orthologs
Species	Human	Mouse
Entrez	54971	53325
Ensembl	ENSG00000172530	ENSMUSG00000025316
UniProt	Q8N9N5	Q8VBU8
RefSeq (mRNA)	NM_001173539; NM_001173540; NM_001173541; NM_001173542; NM_001173543 NM_017869; NM_079837	NM_001110100; NM_001285981; NM_001285983; NM_016812
RefSeq (protein)	NP_001167010; NP_001167011; NP_001167012; NP_001167013; NP_001167014 NP_060339; NP_524576	NP_001103570; NP_001272910; NP_001272912; NP_058092
Location (UCSC)	Chr 16: 87.95 – 88.08 Mb	Chr 8: 122.68 – 122.76 Mb
PubMed search
- Wikidata
View/Edit Human	View/Edit Mouse

Protein BANP is a protein that can be found in humans, it is encoded by the BANP gene. It is a member of the human gene family, "BEN-domain containing", which includes eight other genes: BEND2, BEND3, BEND4, BEND5, BEND6, BEND7, NACC1 (BEND8), and NACC2 (BEND9). BANP is a protein coding gene that is located in the Nucleoplasm. Its official name is BTG3 associated with nuclear protein. It plays a role in DNA binding, chromatin regulation, repressor, transcription regulation and the cell cycle process. In recombination BANP protein represses T-cell receptors to control recombination during transcription. As a tumor suppressor BANP negatively regulates p53 transcription in recombination. It can be expressed in various tissues in the body including the testis, spleen, and the placenta.

== Function ==
This gene encodes a protein that binds to matrix attachment regions. The protein functions as a tumor suppressor and cell cycle regulator. Alternate transcriptional splice variants, encoding different isoforms, have been characterized.
