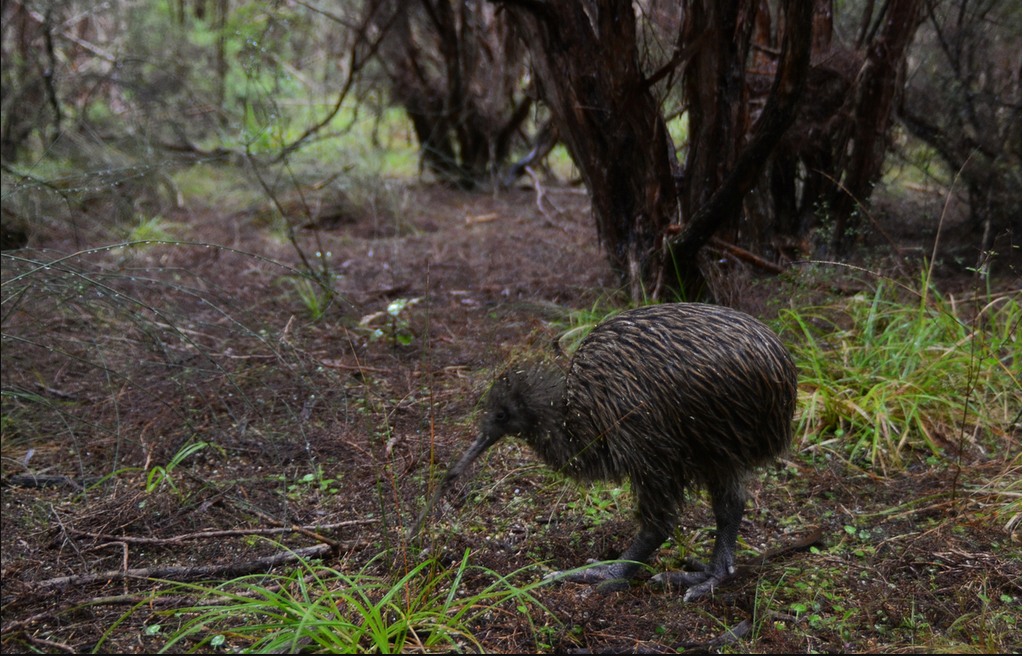

Scientific classification
- Kingdom: Animalia
- Phylum: Chordata
- Class: Aves
- Infraclass: Palaeognathae
- Order: Apterygiformes
- Family: Apterygidae
- Genus: Apteryx
- Species: A. australis
- Subspecies: A. a. australis

Trinomial name
- Apteryx australis australis Shaw, 1813

= Fiordland tokoeka =

Subspecies of bird

The Fiordland tokoeka or Fiordland kiwi (Apteryx australis australis) is a subspecies of southern brown kiwi. It is endemic to New Zealand. Like other ratites, it is flightless.

== Morphology ==
The Fiordland tokoeka is among the largest of southern brown kiwis. It has red-brown feathers that resemble fur. Its wings are small and it has no tail. It has a long, curved bill. The nostrils are at the end of the bill, not at the top near the rest of its face.

== Habitat and diet ==
The Fiordland tokoeka lives in Fiordland and on nearby islands. Its range extends from the Milford Sound to Lake Te Anau to Preservation Inlet.

The adult Fiordland tokoeka is solitary and territorial, fighting other adult kiwis over feeding grounds. It is nocturnal.

== Threats ==
There are about 15,000 Fiordland tokoeka alive. The number of Fiordland kiwis is decreasing because of habitat loss and because invasive species such as stoats, ferrets, dogs, and cats eat adults, chicks, and eggs. However, human beings have begun setting traps for stoats in parts of Fiordland, and the kiwi population has begun to recover.

== Breeding ==
The kiwis make a nest in a hollow log, crack in a rock, or space dug out of the ground. The egg is large and pale green in color. Both the male and female kiwi take turns incubating the egg.
