= SF3A2 =

Protein-coding gene in the species Homo sapiens

Identifiers
- Aliases: SF3A2, PRP11, PRPF11, SAP62, SF3a66, splicing factor 3a subunit 2
- External IDs: OMIM: 600796; MGI: 104912; GeneCards: SF3A2

Gene location (Human)
Chr.	Chromosome 19 (human)
Band	19p13.3	Start	2,236,824 bp
Band	19p13.3	End	2,248,655 bp

Gene location (Mouse)
Chr.	Chromosome 10 (mouse)
Band	10 C1|10 39.72 cM	Start	80,634,032 bp
Band	10 C1|10 39.72 cM	End	80,640,758 bp
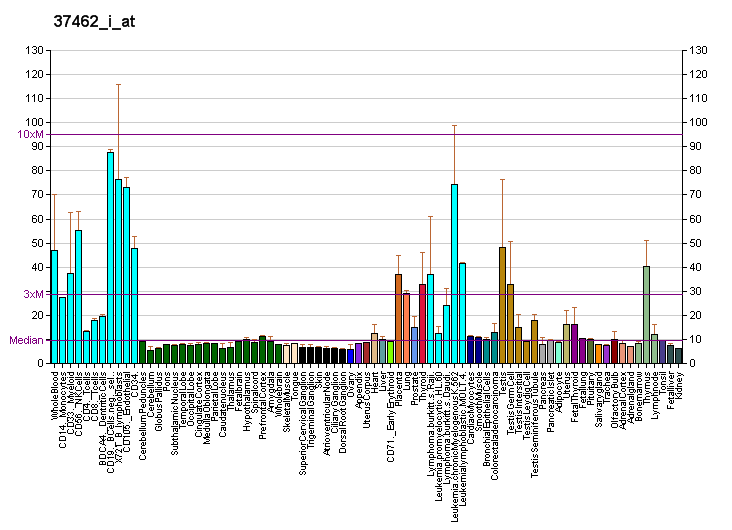

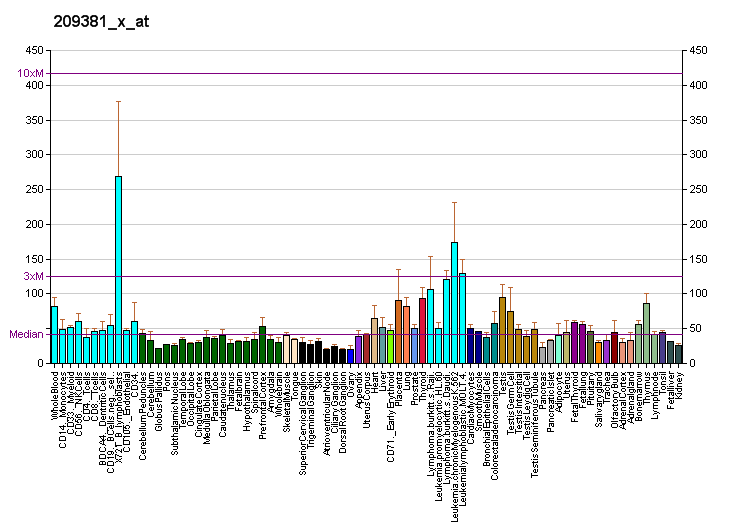
RNA expression pattern
Bgee	Human / Mouse (ortholog); Top expressed in: left testis; left ovary; right testis; right uterine tube; right ovary; body of uterus; granulocyte; canal of the cervix; skin of leg; skin of abdomen / Top expressed in: internal carotid artery; external carotid artery; Ileal epithelium; Paneth cell; lactiferous gland; condyle; somite; trigeminal ganglion; fossa; hair follicle; More reference expression data
BioGPS	More reference expression data
Gene ontology
Molecular function	nucleic acid binding; zinc ion binding; protein binding; metal ion binding; RNA binding
Cellular component	nuclear speck; catalytic step 2 spliceosome; spliceosomal complex; small nuclear ribonucleoprotein complex; U2-type prespliceosome; nucleus; U2 snRNP; nucleoplasm; U2-type precatalytic spliceosome
Biological process	mRNA splicing, via spliceosome; mRNA processing; mRNA 3'-splice site recognition; RNA splicing; positive regulation of neuron projection development; spliceosomal complex assembly; U2-type prespliceosome assembly
Sources:Amigo / QuickGO
Orthologs
Databases	NCBI: entry; OMA: entry
Species	Human	Mouse
Entrez	8175	20222
Ensembl	ENSG00000104897	ENSMUSG00000020211
UniProt	Q15428	Q62203
RefSeq (mRNA)	NM_007165	NM_013651
RefSeq (protein)	NP_009096	n/a
Location (UCSC)	Chr 19: 2.24 – 2.25 Mb	Chr 10: 80.63 – 80.64 Mb
PubMed search
- Wikidata
View/Edit Human	View/Edit Mouse

Splicing factor 3A subunit 2 is a protein that in humans is encoded by the SF3A2 gene.

== Function ==
This gene encodes subunit 2 of the splicing factor 3a protein complex. The splicing factor 3a heterotrimer includes subunits 1, 2 and 3 and is necessary for the in vitro conversion of 15S U2 snRNP into an active 17S particle that performs pre-mRNA splicing. Subunit 2 interacts with subunit 1 through its amino-terminus while the single zinc finger domain of subunit 2 plays a role in its binding to the 15S U2 snRNP. Subunit 2 may also function independently of its RNA splicing function as a microtubule-binding protein.

== Interactions ==
SF3A2 has been shown to interact with DDX46.
