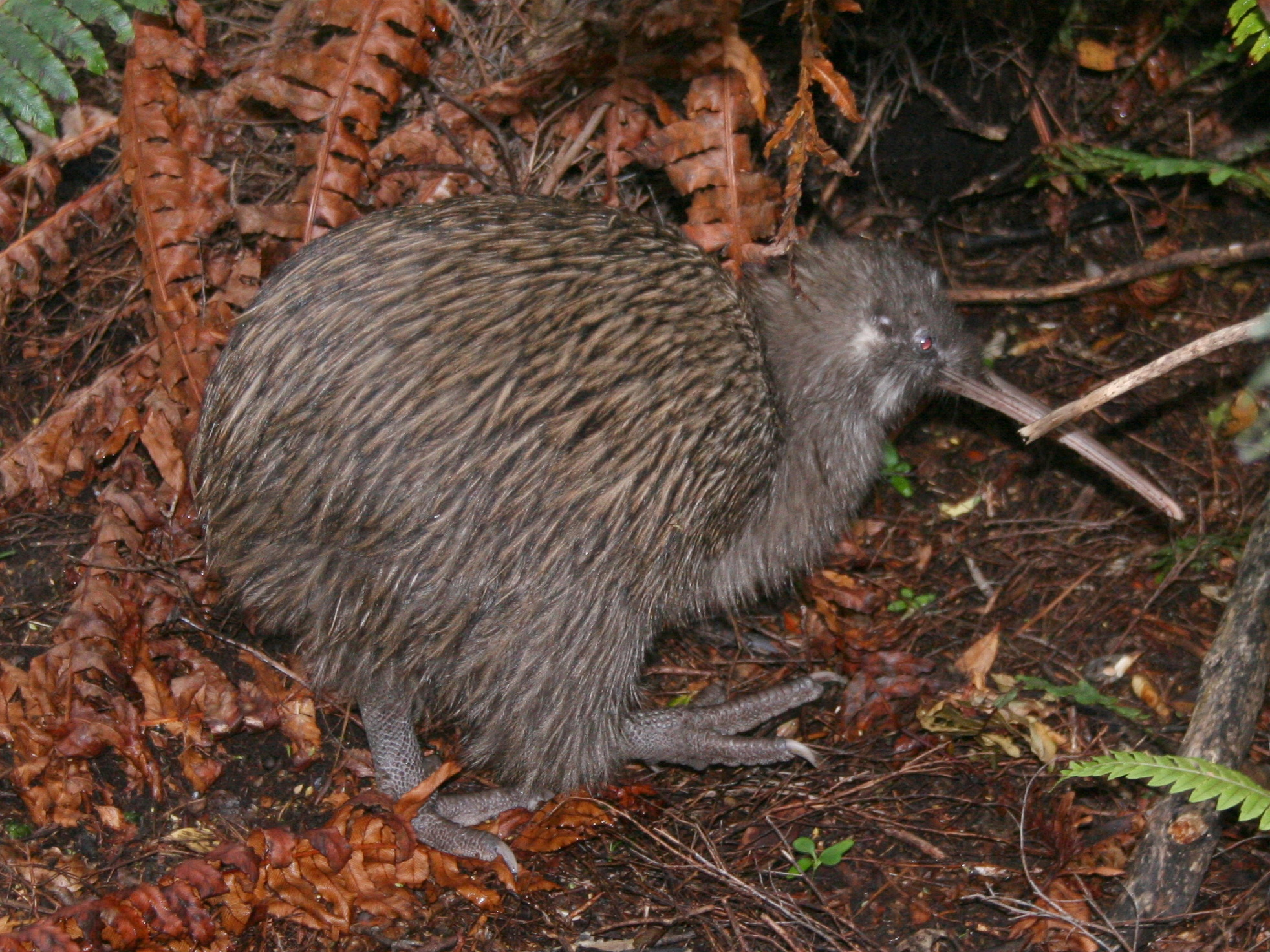
- Stewart Island tokoeka (A. a. lawryi)

Conservation status
- Vulnerable (IUCN 3.1)

Scientific classification
- Kingdom: Animalia
- Phylum: Chordata
- Class: Aves
- Infraclass: Palaeognathae
- Order: Apterygiformes
- Family: Apterygidae
- Genus: Apteryx
- Species: A. australis

Binomial name
- Apteryx australis Shaw, 1813

Subspecies
- A. a. lawryi Rothschild, 1893 (Stewart Island tokoeka); A. a. australis Shaw, 1813 (Haast tokoeka)
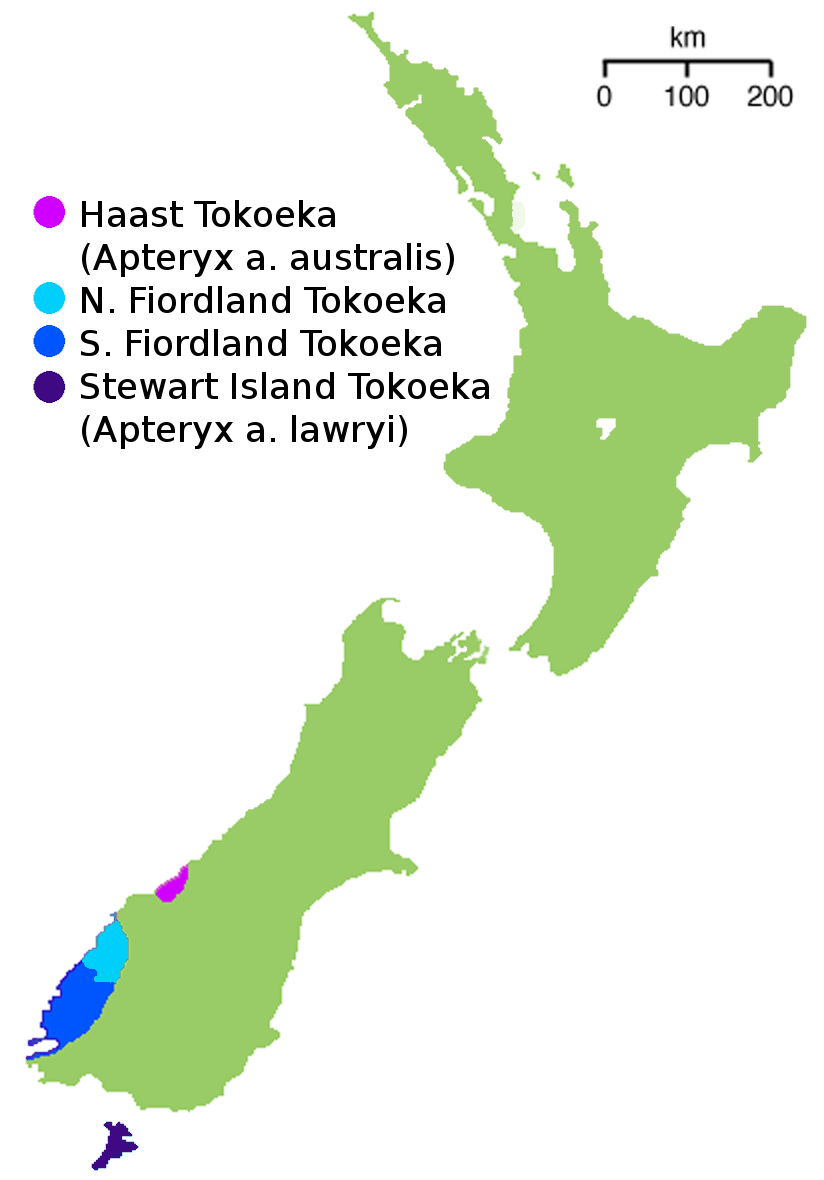
- The distribution of southern brown kiwi

Synonyms
- Apteryx lawryi Rothschild, 1893

= Southern brown kiwi =

Southern brown kiwi Temporal range: Pleistocene-recent

Species of flightless bird

The Southern brown kiwi, Tokoeka, or Common kiwi (Apteryx australis) is a species of kiwi from South Island of New Zealand. Until 2000 it was considered conspecific with the North Island brown kiwi, and still is by some authorities.

== Taxonomy ==
Apteryx australis is based on Greek and Latin. Apteryx means "A-" without "pterux" wings, and "australis" from "auster" the south wind, and "-alis" relating to. The southern brown kiwi belongs to the kiwi family and it is a ratite, and a member of the order Apterygiformes. Like all ratites, its sternum has no keel, it is flightless, and it has a distinctive palate.

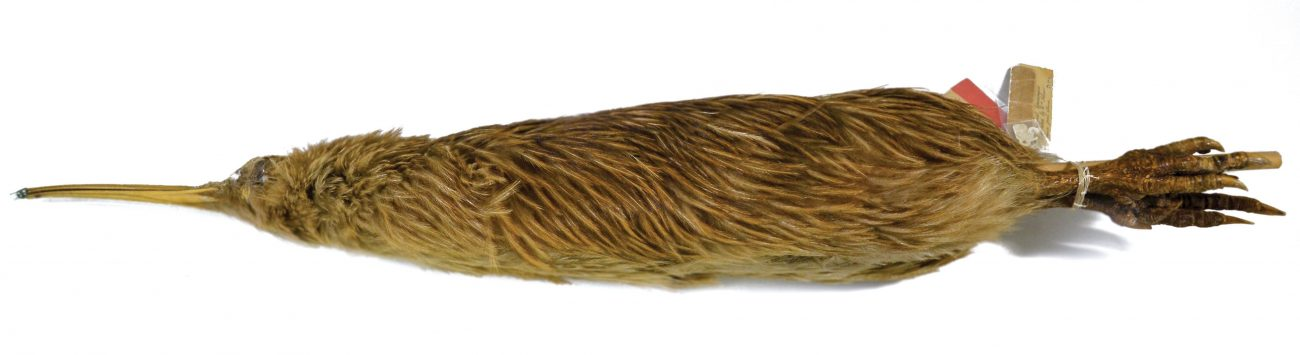
A. australis holotype from World Museum

The holotype specimen of Apteryx australis Shaw is held in the collections of National Museums Liverpool at World Museum, with accession number NML-VZ D180. The specimen was collected by Captain Barclay at Dusky Sound, South Island, New Zealand and came to the Liverpool national collection via the 13th Earl of Derby's collection which was bequeathed to the people of Liverpool.

The southern brown kiwi is divided into two subspecies, with some conservationists arguing for a third:

- A. a. australis, the Fiordland tokoeka, with a population of approximately 15,000 birds is found on and near the Fiordland on the South Island of New Zealand. A disjunct population, near Haast, called the Haast tokoeka or Haast brown kiwi (not to be confused with Apteryx haastii), is rare (with only about 350 specimens left) and is characterised by its rufous plumage.
- A. a. lawryi, the Stewart Island tokoeka, is relatively common (20,000 birds) throughout its range, with about 17 birds per square kilometre. Its feathers are streaked lengthwise with reddish brown.

A specimen described as Apteryx occidentalis in 1893 is often considered a junior synonym of Apteryx owenii, but a study in 2002 indicated this may be a hybrid between Apteryx australis and Apteryx owenii.

A 2016 study conducted phylogenetic and population genetic analyses of the genus Apteryx. A Bayesian phylogeny using 1,710 base pairs of mtDNA for 203 individuals (including Holocene-aged fossil kiwi) showed that all five recognized species of kiwi are reciprocally monophyletic. The phylogeny also showed extensive differentiation between extant populations within A. australis and A. mantelli as well as fossil populations in A. australis, A. owenii and A. rowi. The researchers generated the following species tree of the five recognized species of kiwi in two clades (spotted and brown) with all divergence events having occurred within the last 8 million years.

- Apteryx (3.85 mya)
  - (0.55 mya)
    - Apteryx owenii
    - Apteryx maxima
  - (1.56 mya)
    - - (1.12 mya)
        - Apteryx mantelli
        - Apteryx rowi
    - Apteryx australis

== Description ==
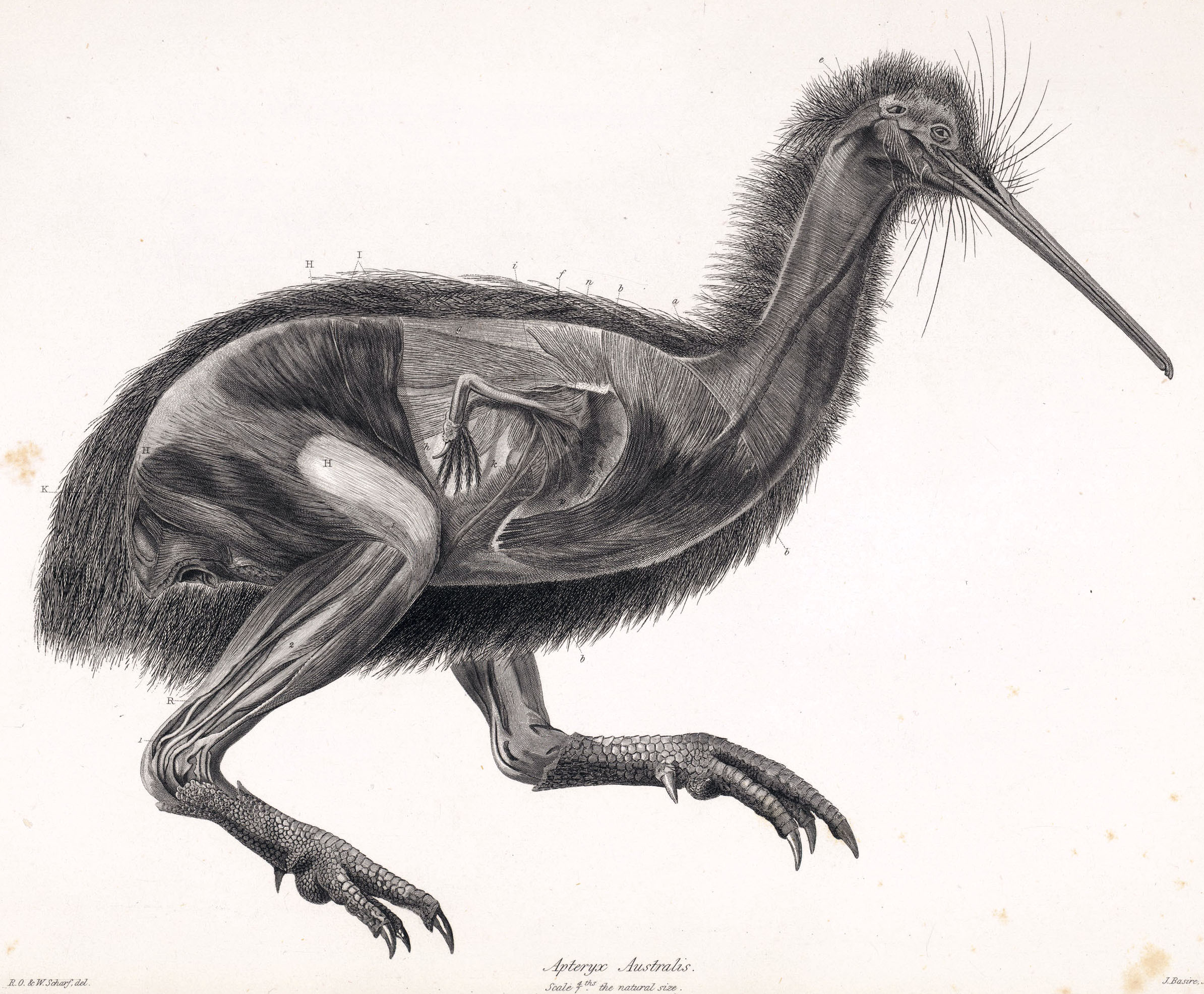
Drawing of dissected specimen, with exposed muscles and wing-claw

It has no preen gland, and its feathers have no aftershafts and no barbules. There are large vibrissae around its gape, and it has no tail, only a pygostyle. This species has a length of 45 to 55 cm (18–22 in) and the female weighs 2.1 to 3.9 kg (4.6–8.6 lb) and the male weighs 1.6 to 2.8 kg (3.5–6.2 lb). Its bill is long and slender with a slight down-curve. Like other kiwis it is nocturnal. The colour of its plumage is rufous with some streaking.

== Behaviour ==
=== Vocalisation ===
Southern brown kiwi communicate vocally to aid in defending their territory. They will also sing duets with each other, with the male shrill "kee-wee" or "kee-kee" and the females hoarse "kurr kurr". Males are more vocal and they both call in an upright position with their legs stretched out and their bill pointing up.

=== Diet ===
Foraging on Stewart Island

The southern brown kiwi has a long slender bill with lateral nostrils at the tip, which helps give them their keen sense of smell. They utilise this, more than sight and sound, to forage in dirt for invertebrates, including earthworms, beetle larvae, snails, crayfish, spiders, centipedes, and orthoptera, as well as eels and amphibians. Its gizzard is weak, and underutilised due to the lack of plant matter. Its caeca are long and narrow and aid in digestion.

=== Reproduction ===
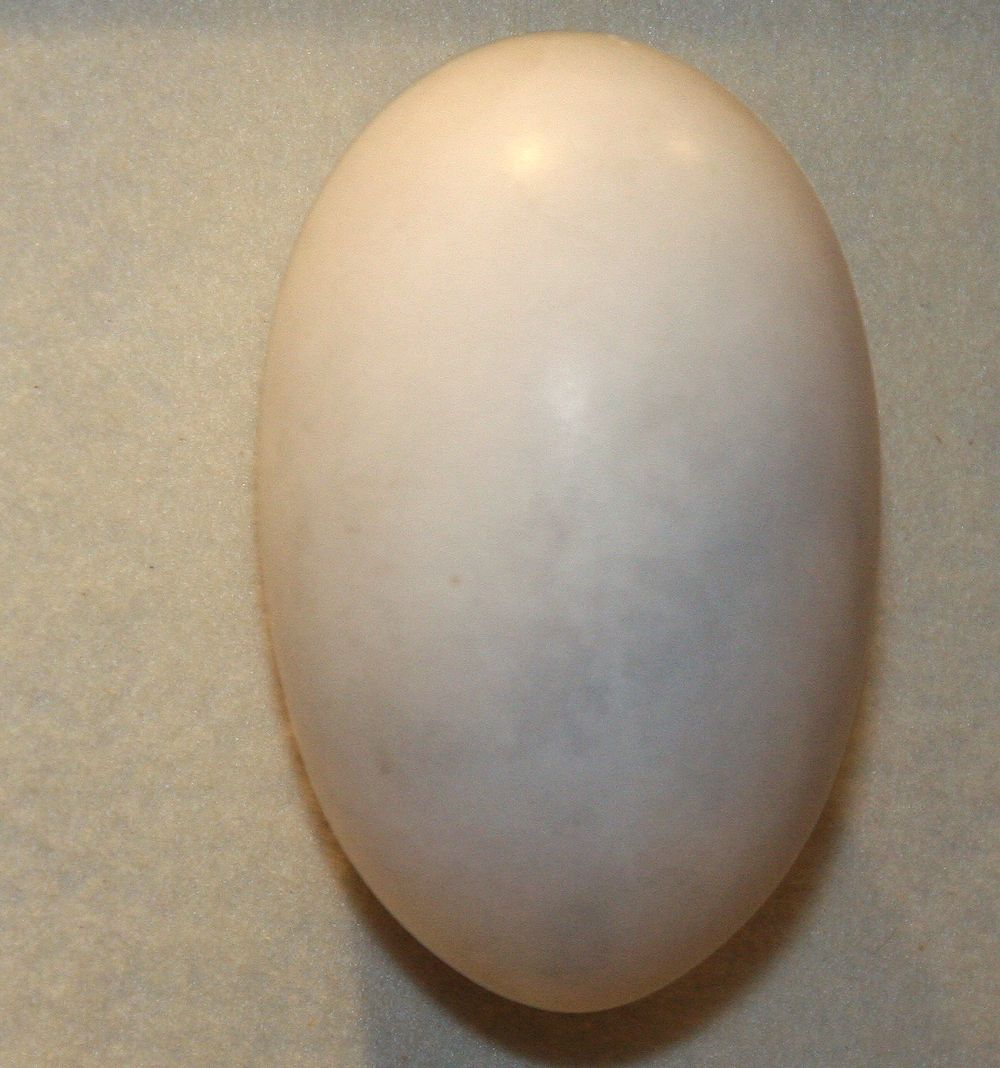
Egg

The southern brown kiwi, like all kiwi, has two functioning ovaries, however only the left oviduct functions, allowing eggs from both ovaries to pass through. It is a monogamous species and once paired up, they will defend their territories with warning calls. The size of their territory is between 4.9 and 43 hectares (12 and 106 acres). Nests are made in burrows, or sheltered beneath thick vegetation. The female lays 1–3 eggs, typically just one, which is incubated for 75–90 days. These eggs are large, representing 14–20% of the female's body mass, weighing 430 g (0.95 lb) and measuring 11.5–13.7 cm (4.5–5.4 in) in length and 7–8.3 cm (2.8–3.3 in) in width. After a few days the chick will exit the nest and feed on its own, although it may stay around parents for a year. When not incubating eggs, they roost alone in sheltered places at ground level.

== Range and habitat ==
Southern brown kiwi live in the South Island and Stewart Island. On the mainland (South Island) they live in Fiordland and Westland. Their range is temperate and sub-tropical forests, grassland, and shrubland, the denser the better. They are widespread throughout Stewart Island where they also live on the sand dunes.

Breeding Population and Trends
Location	Population	Date	Trend
Stewart Island	20,000	1996	Stable
Fiordland	7,000	1996	Decreasing
Haast	300	2008	Increasing
Total (New Zealand)	27,300	—	—

== Conservation ==
In 2000, after being recognised by IUCN, they were placed in the Vulnerable status group. They have an occurrence range of 9,800 km^{2} (3,800 sq mi) and population of 27,000 was estimated in 1996. Brush-tailed possums, Trichosurus vulpecula, and stoats, Mustela erminea, will eat the eggs, while stoats and cats will eat chicks and juveniles. Adults are also under threat as dogs, ferrets, and brush-tailed possums, attack them and the juveniles. The Stewart Island population is stable due to the lack of these predators, however stoats may have colonised the island in 2000.

In 2018 a drought caused a poor breeding season for Haast tokoeka and killed three chicks; six were airlifted to Orokonui Ecosanctuary near Dunedin, and then on to a "creche" on Rona Island in Lake Manapouri, Fiordland.
