= NACC1 =

Protein-coding gene in humans

Identifiers
- Aliases: NACC1, BEND8, BTBD14B, BTBD30, NAC-1, NAC1, nucleus accumbens associated 1, NECFM
- External IDs: OMIM: 610672; MGI: 1914080; GeneCards: NACC1
Available structures
PDB	Ortholog search: PDBe RCSB
PDB	List of PDB id codes 3GA1, 4U2N

Gene location (Human)
Chr.	Chromosome 19 (human)
Band	19p13.13	Start	13,116,862 bp
Band	19p13.13	End	13,141,147 bp

Gene location (Mouse)
Chr.	Chromosome 8 (mouse)
Band	8 C3|8 41.02 cM	Start	85,397,108 bp
Band	8 C3|8 41.02 cM	End	85,414,531 bp
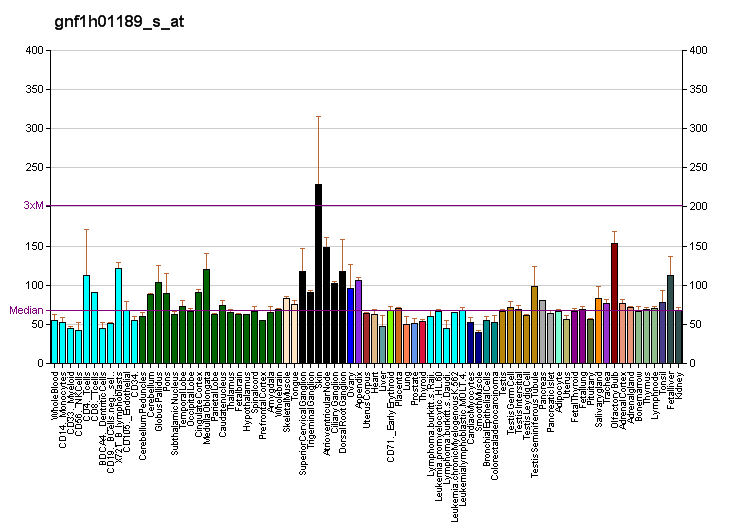

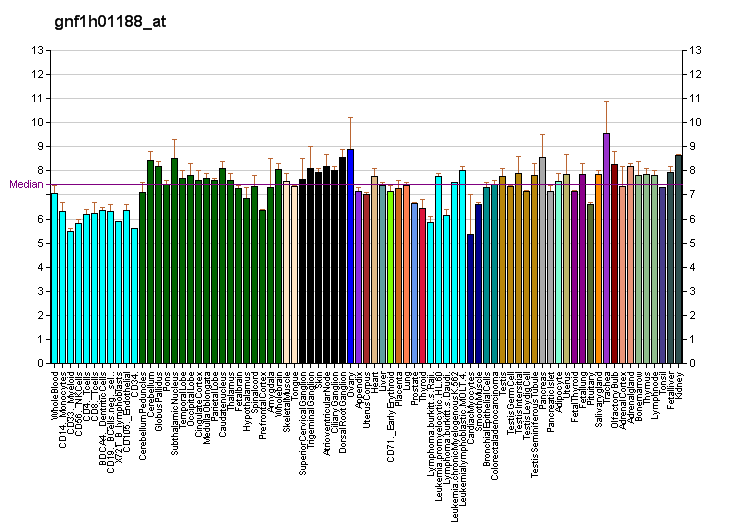
RNA expression pattern
Bgee	Human / Mouse (ortholog); Top expressed in: pancreatic ductal cell; nasal epithelium; skin of arm; stromal cell of endometrium; myocardium of left ventricle; prefrontal cortex; amygdala; anterior cingulate cortex; buccal mucosa cell; decidua / Top expressed in: tail of embryo; genital tubercle; epiblast; zygote; ventricular zone; pyloric antrum; yolk sac; dentate gyrus of hippocampal formation granule cell; crypt of lieberkuhn of small intestine; superior frontal gyrus; More reference expression data
BioGPS	More reference expression data
Orthologs
Databases	NCBI: entry; OMA: entry
Species	Human	Mouse
Entrez	112939	66830
Ensembl	ENSG00000160877	ENSMUSG00000001910
UniProt	Q96RE7	Q7TSZ8
RefSeq (mRNA)	NM_052876	NM_025788
RefSeq (protein)	NP_443108	NP_080064
Location (UCSC)	Chr 19: 13.12 – 13.14 Mb	Chr 8: 85.4 – 85.41 Mb
PubMed search
- Wikidata
View/Edit Human	View/Edit Mouse

Nucleus accumbens-associated protein 1 is a protein that in humans is encoded by the NACC1 gene.
