= Filadelfo Simi =

Italian painter and sculptor (1849–1923)

Filadelfo Simi (February 11, 1849 – January 5, 1923) was an Italian painter and sculptor.

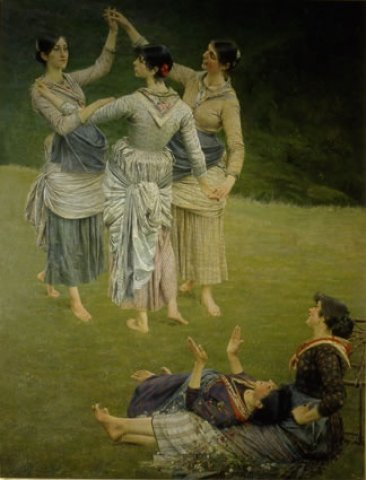
Un riflesso

He was born in Versilia in Tuscany, and resident in Florence. He first attended the School of Fine Arts at Seravezza, but then from 1869 to 1873 attended the Academy of Fine Arts of Florence. One patron during these years was the engineer Angiolo Vegni.

At the 1873 Promotrice, he exhibited a La giovinezza dell’Alfieri. From 1874 to 1878, he lived mainly in Paris, where he frequented the studio of Jean-Léon Gérôme. During 1876, he traveled through Spain with the painter Alden Weir. In 1878, at the Exposition Artistique of the Paris Salon, he exhibited a Forest of Fontainebleau. He also paints the realistic Portrait of Old Lady, now found in the Galleria d’Arte Moderna in the Palazzo Pitti.

He returns to Italy and participated in exhibitions in Florence. In 1881, he displays a canvas titled The Phtisic Woman (La Tisica; depicting a woman afflicted with tuberculosis). In 1883, he was nominated a Knight of the Order of the Crown of Italy; he became Honorary Academic In Florence (1884), Bologna (1888) and the Brera Academy in Milan (1895). In 1886, he opened a school for artists. In 1888 he became professor of the Scuola del Nudo at the Florentine Academy.

He was not prolific, and dedicated himself to a few paintings per year. At the 1885 Promotrice of Florence, he exhibited a Studio dal vero, and at 1887 at the Venetian Exposizione Nazionale Artistica, he had a painting titled: l'l riflesso, and a Portrait of his parents. The former painting would later be awarded a gold medal at an 1888 Munich Exhibition and in 1893 at Florentine Annual Exposition of Fine Arts, a grand prize worth 5000 Lire. In Bologna in 1888, among the four canvases exhibited were: Riposo, San Girolamo, and Neruccia and Jettatura.

At the 1889 Universal Exhibition in Paris, his diptych was awarded a bronze medal. He also was a sculptor, sending in 1908 a large marble statue commissioned for a chapel in Halifax, Canada by the rector of the Accademia Monte San Vincenzo. That same year, he sent a Monument of Garibaldi to the Italian Community of Porto Alegre.

Simi's daughter Nerina Simi (1890–1987) was a prominent art teacher in Florence.

Simi designed and built a house for himself and his daughter in Scala di Stazzema in the Province of Lucca, the Studio Simi, which after her death was opened as a museum of their work.

Sim died in Florence in 1923.
