= Montalto (Apuan Alps) =

Mountain in Italy

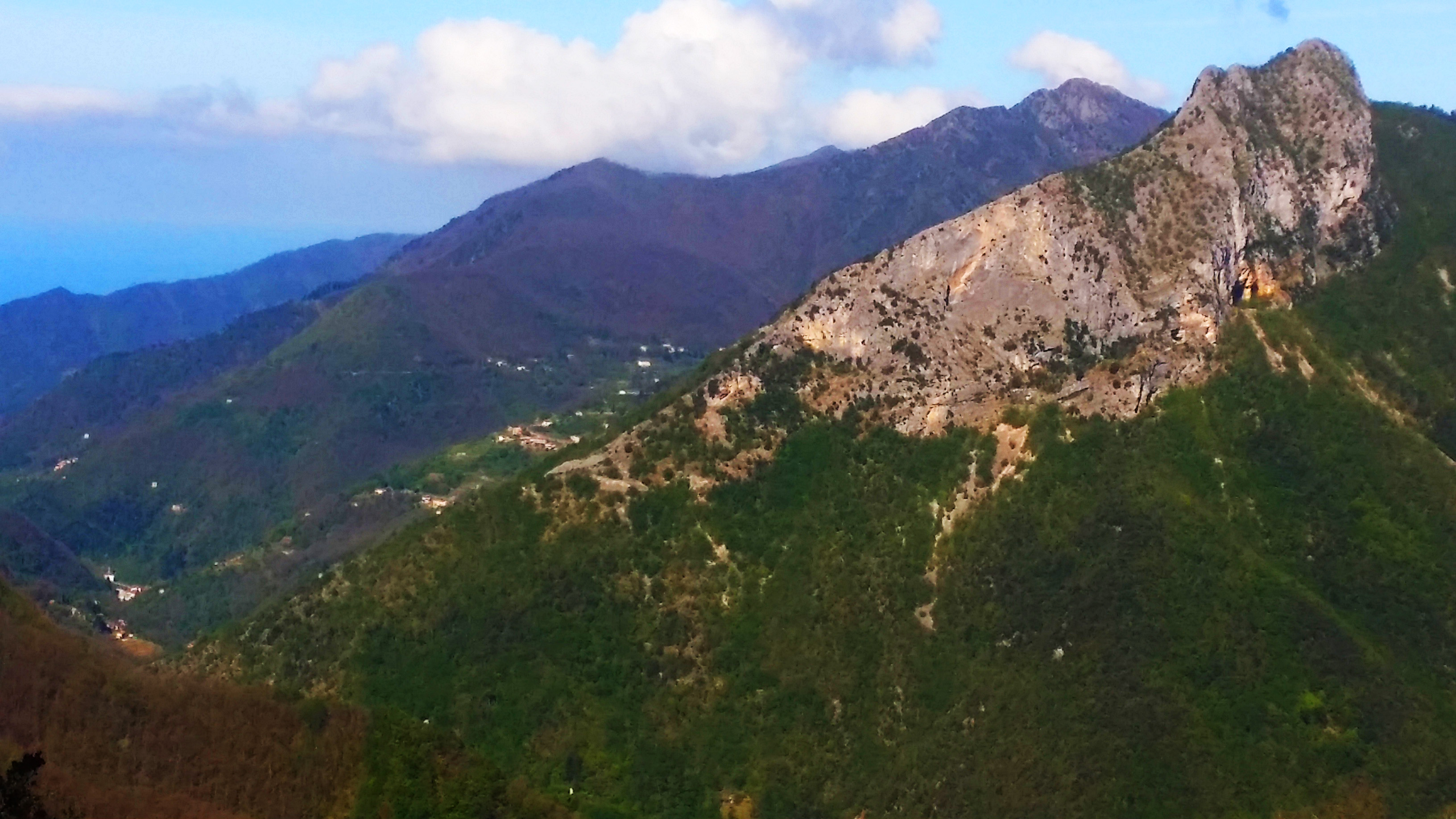
- The rocky Montalto seen from Stazzema

Highest point
- Elevation: 913 m (2,995 ft)
- Coordinates: 44°00′32″N 10°17′23″E

Naming
- English translation: High Mountain

Geography
- Parent range: Apuan Alps

Montalto (correctly spelled as Monte Alto or Mont'Alto, in English High Mountain) is a mountain located in Tuscany, Italy and part of the Apuan Alps range. Its highest peak is at roughly 913 meters above the sea level and it is also home of two villages, Retignano and Volegno, in the municipality of Stazzema, Province of Lucca.

Montalto was exploited in the past for its well-known marble quarries, opened during the nineteenth century. More recently it was selected for its strategic position to be part of the Gothic Line, during World War II.

== History ==
=== Roman Period ===
Through some findings it can be argued that the area of Montalto was already populated in prehistoric times, from the Paleolithic period up to the Bronze Age and Iron Age.

The most certain origins of the neighboring villages can date back to the twenty years from 580 to 560 BC, in Roman times, when the inhabitants of the Apuan Alps were known as Liguri Apuani.

The Ligurian Apuani, or more simply Apuani, were a population divided into various tribes, called Nomen ("name") by Roman historians; one of these tribes settled among the mountain massifs of the Montalto complex, very extensive, bordered by natural borders and full of resources, including streams, medicinal plants and fauna. Here the Apuans led a life sowing and exploiting the area of Retignano as a residential area from the spring months until the first winter. In the more sheltered areas and clearings of "Gordici" and "Valimoni", located in the woods, about 700 meters above sea level, called the Apuani luki ("prairies") there were the remains of small settlements. In the event of war, recourse to a fortified peak was envisaged, a peak from which the horizon could be seen and promptly signaled the arrival of the war. For Retignano, summit tale coincides with the summit of Mount "Castello", whose etymology probably has something to do with this fact. From there you can see the entire Versilia valley, the coast and, on clear days, even a glimpse of the Tuscan archipelago.

Over the centuries, a cause of great interest in the problems of Versilia, the Apuan Ligurians were attacked several times by Roman militias. After the defeat of Hannibal, as told by Tito Livio, in 193 a.C. The Ligurians took the initiative, counterattacking the Romans and thus starting a long period of war. Retignano (Montalto) is one of the strongholds of the Ligurian Apuans, so much opposed by Rome.

In 186 BC, the Ligurians inflicted a heavy defeat to the troops of the consul Quintus Marcius Philip, attracting hundreds of Roman legionaries in a series of narrow gorges and steep slopes of Montalto. The place of the disaster, according to Tito Livio, then took the name of Saltus Marcius, or "the jump of Marcio". The Roman historian says that the Romans had to strip their weapons only to beat retreat more quickly.

=== Marble era ===
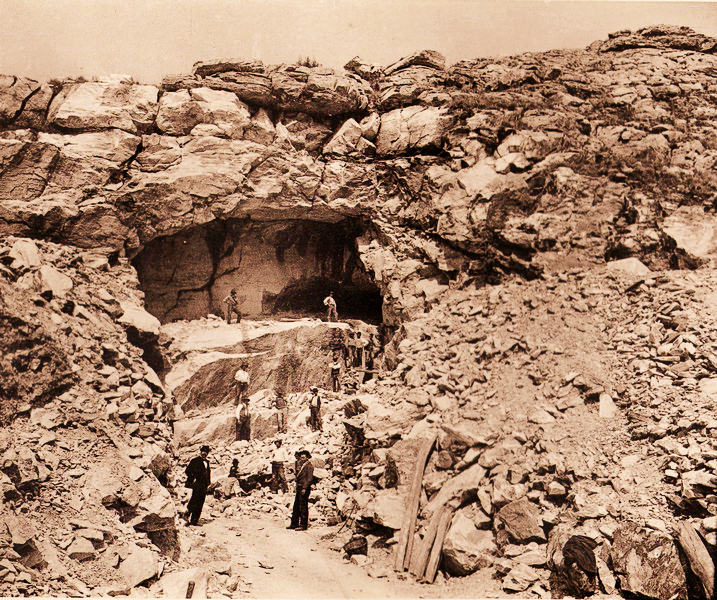
Marble quarry called "Messette", in 1915-1916.

Around 1820, a group of French and British entrepreneurs visited Versilia. While the Frenchman Boumond and his family settled in Riomagno, Seravezza, the Englishman James Beresford (in the archives marked as Belessforde) and his partner Gybrin preferred Retignano. With the help of the inhabitants, in the summer of 1820 they found in the Canaletta quarry a precious marble available only in the mountains of Retignano, an unusual mix of mixed, turquoise and floral bardiglio. They decided to start an extractive session and immediately sent by sea several marble blocks in Britain, presumably in London, where some monuments are in Versilia marble, such as Marble Arch. The samples sent by sea to Great Britain were made of marble, turquoise and bardiglio flourished. These marbles immediately pleased the English that, recognizing the potential of the marble sites, set up a real company and a commercial activity in Retignano.

As Fabrizio Federigi recalls, the retignanesi, a very industrious people, immediately committed themselves to reestablishing the activity of marble extraction in the Alta Versilia, reactivating also sites near Levigliani.

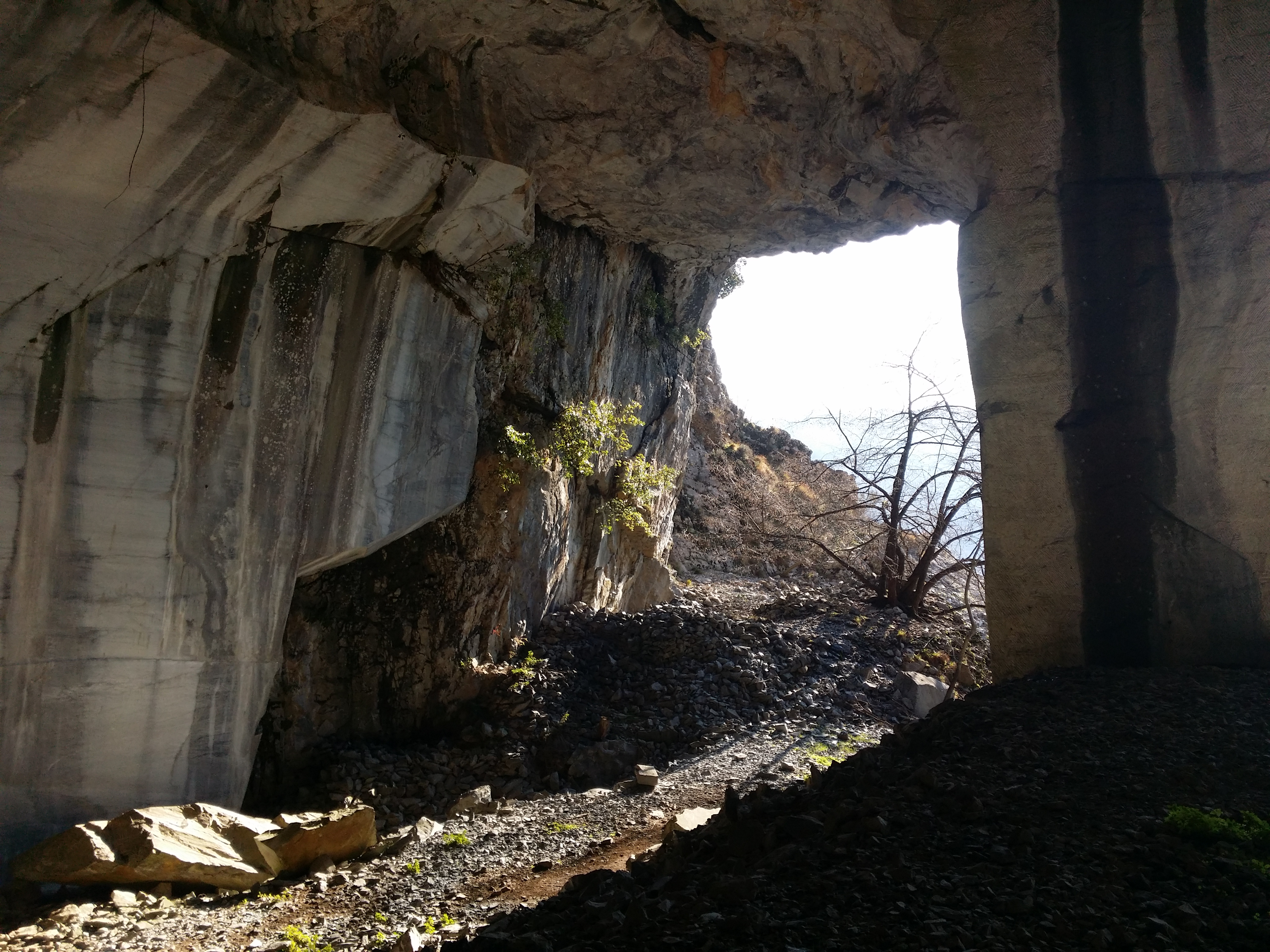
The interior of a marble quarry

In 1821 the two entrepreneurs, Beresford and Grybrin, with local support, founded a company and rented by Francesco Guglielmi, for nine years and with the canon of 6000 scudi, a quarry (Messette) from which they shipped marble to England. The inhabitants of Retignano were particularly active in contributing to the recovery of the marble industry in Versilia, engaging in the quarries of Gabbro, Ajola, Gordici and Messette, which are part of the complex of the Mont'Alto di Retignano quarries. In 1845 the retignanesi opposed the English entrepreneur William Walton, as his marble trade damaged their land for grazing and harvesting chestnuts and wood. At the time of the Unification of Italy, in 1861, the inhabitants of the village were engaged in a large part in the excavations and the economy became mainly linked to marble, with a progressive less than half of the cultivation of chestnut trees and a reduction of land destined to crops.

In 1861, at the time of the Unification of Italy, most of the inhabitants of the village were engaged in excavations and this led to the abandonment of many crops in the chestnut groves. In the two-year period 1861-1862, according to some estimates of the leviglianese Emilio Simi, more than half of the Versilian workforce was employed in marble activities. In Retignano the extractions were not sufficiently profitable and having abandoned fields and livestock forced many people to emigrate to the plains. Marino Bazzichi claims that in the late nineteenth century 3680 stazzemesi (of which about a hundred of Retignano) went around the world in search of fortune.

Some documents show that the marble of Retignano was also used in the reconstruction of the Montecassino monastery.

Alpinists who visited Montalto were Francis Fox Tuckett, Douglas William Freshfield and Giovanni Targioni Tozzetti.

== Sports ==
The main slope of the mountain has tree routes for free climbing and it is regulated by the Tuscany Region.

== See also ==
- Retignano
- Apuan Alps
- Volegno
