= Nerina Simi =

Italian painter

Nerina "Nera" Simi (April 13, 1890 in Florence – February 4, 1987 in Florence), also known as "La Signorina", was an Italian artist and a teacher of painting and drawing. She was the daughter of the Italian painter Filadelfo (Philadelphus) Simi (1849–1923), himself a student of the French academician Jean-Léon Gérôme (1824–1904).

== Education ==
She spent eight years under her father's tutelage at his Florentine atelier The International Studio on Via Tripoli where, even as a child, she had assisted him preparing pencils, mixing colours and helping students. In 1909 she enrolled at the Accademia di Belle Arti in Florence and in 1914 graduated with a qualification to teach drawing.

== Working life ==
She taught drawing in Florence at the Istituto delle Montalve, called La Quiete (a villa once belonging to a branch of the Medici family), while continuing to assist her father in his studio. During 1917 and 1918 she exhibited and sold her work at exhibitions in Forte dei Marmi and Florence alongside that of her father and her brother, Renzo Simi (1889–1943). Upon Filadelfo’s death, in 1923, she inherited his studio on Via Tripoli and took over his teaching. As well, for 40 years, she continued to teach at La Quiete. The Florentine painter Pietro Annigoni (1910–1988) considered Simi “the greatest drawing teacher of the 20th century.”

== Stazzema ==
She spent summers in Stazzema, a small town in the foothills of the Apuane Alps, where she often had a following of students. In 2014 the municipality of Stazzema renamed a public piazza for her and celebrated the event with a temporary exhibition of work by her former students. The Studio Simi, the house that belonged to her and her father, has been opened as a museum of their work.

== Death ==
Simi died on February 4, 1987, in Florence. She is buried, with her parents, at the cemetery of San Miniato.

== Bibliography ==
- Joke Frima, La Signorina -- La Maestra Nera Simi e suoi allievi. Holland: Art Revisited, Tolbert, 2017 ISBN 978-94-92629-01-2
