= Pania della Croce =

Mountain in Italy

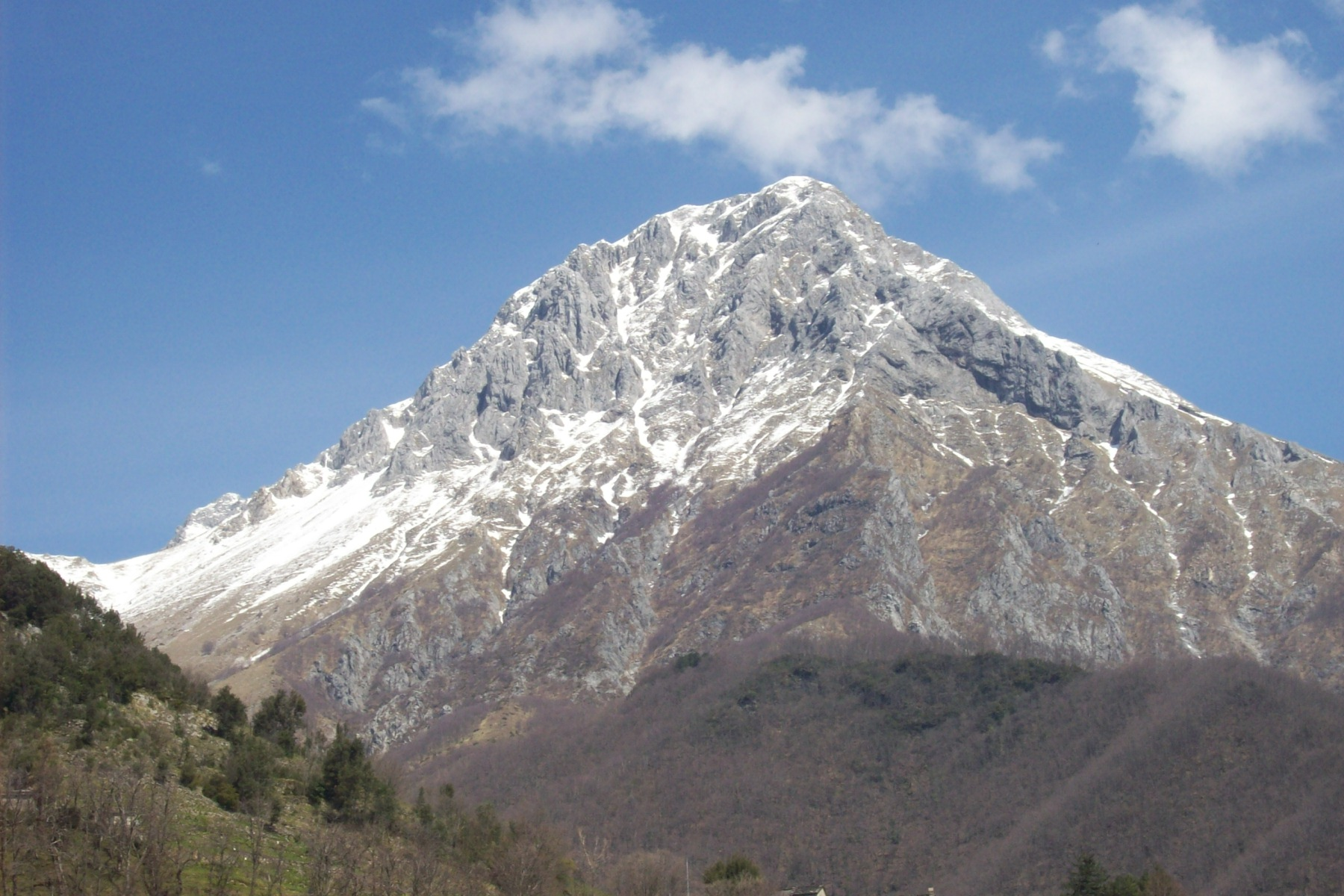
- Pania della Croce seen from Volegno, in the upper Versilia.

Highest point
- Elevation: 1,858 m (6,096 ft)
- Coordinates: 44°02′12″N 10°19′25″E

Geography
- Location: Tuscany, Italy
- Parent range: Alpi Apuane

Pania della Croce is a mountain (1,858 m) in the Alpi Apuane, in Tuscany, central Italy. It is the highest peak in the Panie Group (Gruppo delle Panie), located not far from the Tyrrhenian Sea coast.

On very clear days Monviso, (in Piedmont), Monte Amiata and Corsica can all be seen from its summit, together with the Tyrrhenian coastline.

== Climbing ==
Pania della Croce has long been a destination for mountaineers, with guidebooks recommending the mountain for climbing since the 1800s. Despite its popularity as a climbing destination, accidents have been known to happen while scaling the peak.

=== Recent incidents ===
In December 2017, a climber was killed after slipping 200 meters.

In December 2023, a climber slipped 200m from the mountain and suffered facial trauma.

In January 2024, a woman had to be rescued from Pania della Croce after falling from the trail after being blown off in 50-knot winds.

In August 2024, a climber was found dead below the Cenge dei Partigiani, a ridge trail connecting Pania della Croce after slipping 110 meters.

== See also ==
- Monte Procinto
