= Oratory of Maria Santissima Assunta in Cielo, Retignano =

Chapel of Our Lady's Assumption into Heaven
- Oratorio di Maria Santissima Assunta in Cielo
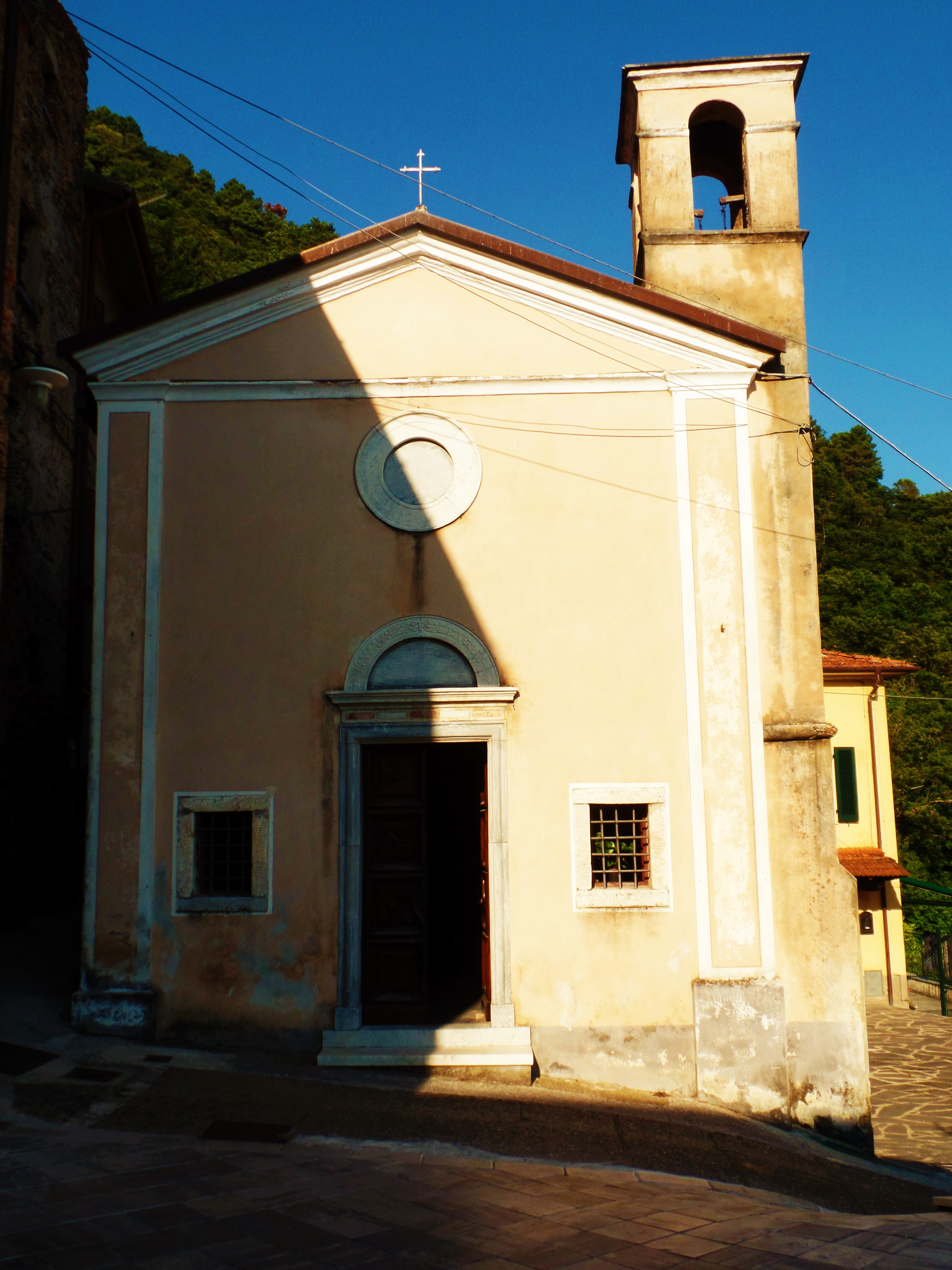

Religion
- Affiliation: Roman Catholic
- Year consecrated: 1785

Location
- Location: Retignano, Tuscany
- Country: Italy
- Interactive map of Chapel of Our Lady's Assumption into Heaven
- Coordinates: 44°00′16.94″N 10°16′25.9″E

Architecture
- Type: Church
- Groundbreaking: 1780
- Completed: 1785

The Chapel of Our Lady's Assumption into Heaven (Italian Oratorio di Maria Santissima Assunta in Cielo), sometimes spelled as Chapel of Our Lady and also known as Little Church (Italian: Chiesina), is a church located in Retignano, a village in the municipality of Stazzema, Italy.

== History ==
This little church construction started in 1780 ca., as reported in some records found by the priest Martino Bertagna in the 1960s. Dedicated to Holy Mary, the building was first committed by a group of local Discalced Carmelite friars and was considered the second main place of worship in the village. Due to its small size compared to the main church, it was renamed "little church".

It is believed that the building was built to compensate for the loss of other parish grounds, such as Ruosina and Gallena, following the motu proprio of 1776 by the Grand Duke of Tuscany, Pietro Leopoldo I. This provision led to the abolition of the comunelli ("little counties") and, consequently, the redefinition of the boundaries of Retignano, which thus found itself without jurisdiction over the church of Ruosina, whose inhabited center partly gravitated already under Seravezza's dependencies. The musical instrument inside was purchased by a group of Franciscan fathers of Retignano in 1810, from the church of Santa Croce alle Piagge, near Pisa. The major works inside are attributed to artist Lorenzo Stagi and were transferred there after the original church was deconsecrated. Altars and other decorations date back to the fifteenth century, while the paintings and images of the Stations of the Cross are from the period between the eighteenth and nineteenth centuries.

== Celebrations ==
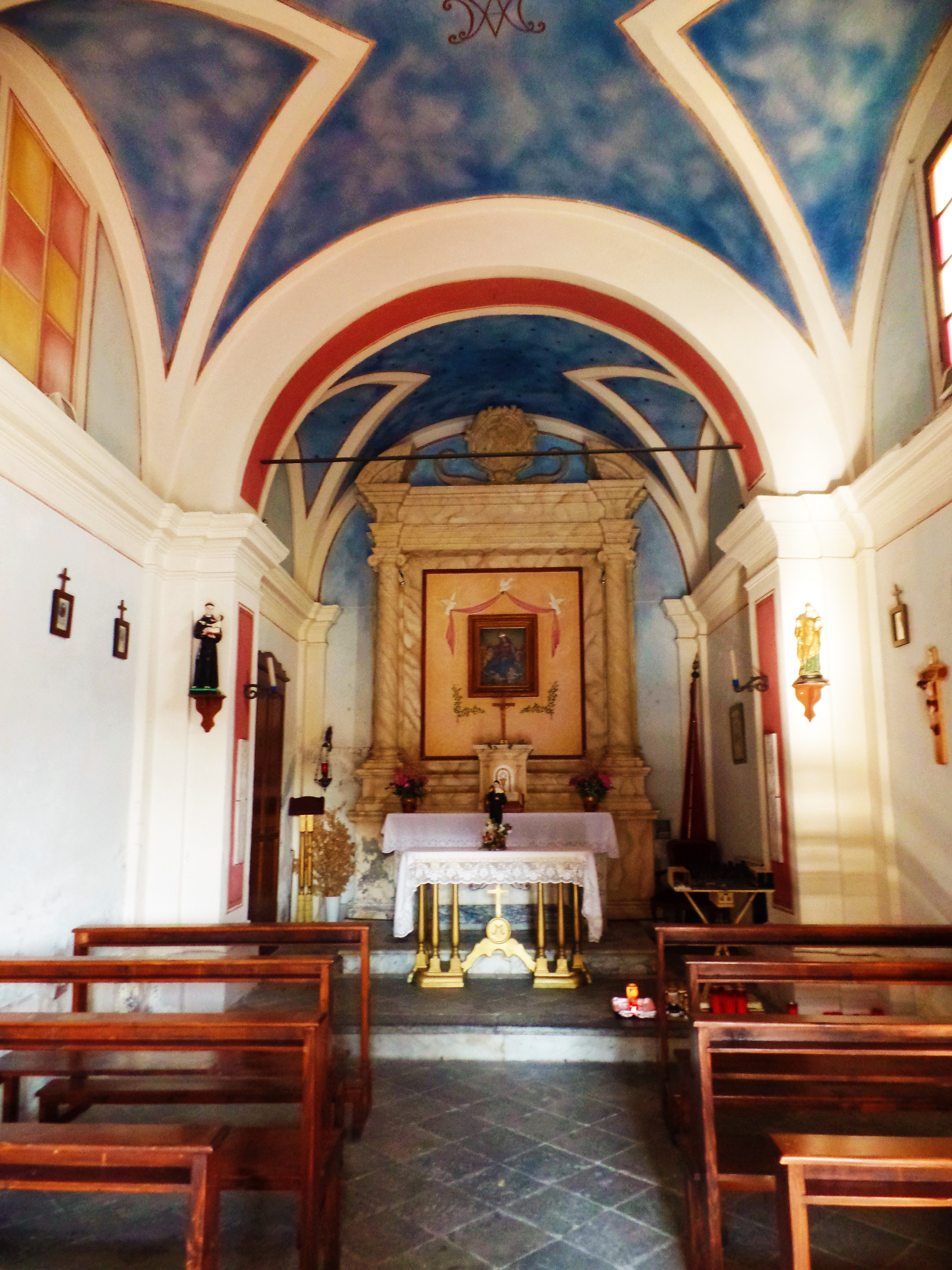
Interior design

Main worship celebrations take place in the local main church. However, in May and on August 15 (a day dedicated to Holy Mary), the mass is celebrated in this little church.

In 1910, when the local volunteer association was created, the priest and other members of this association decided to ring the bells of the church in case of danger. For example, in 1944 those bells were frequently rang due to Nazi raids or bombings, as the village was occupied by German troops.

== See also ==
- Retignano
