= Monte Procinto =

Mountain in the Alpi Apuane, Tuscany, Italy

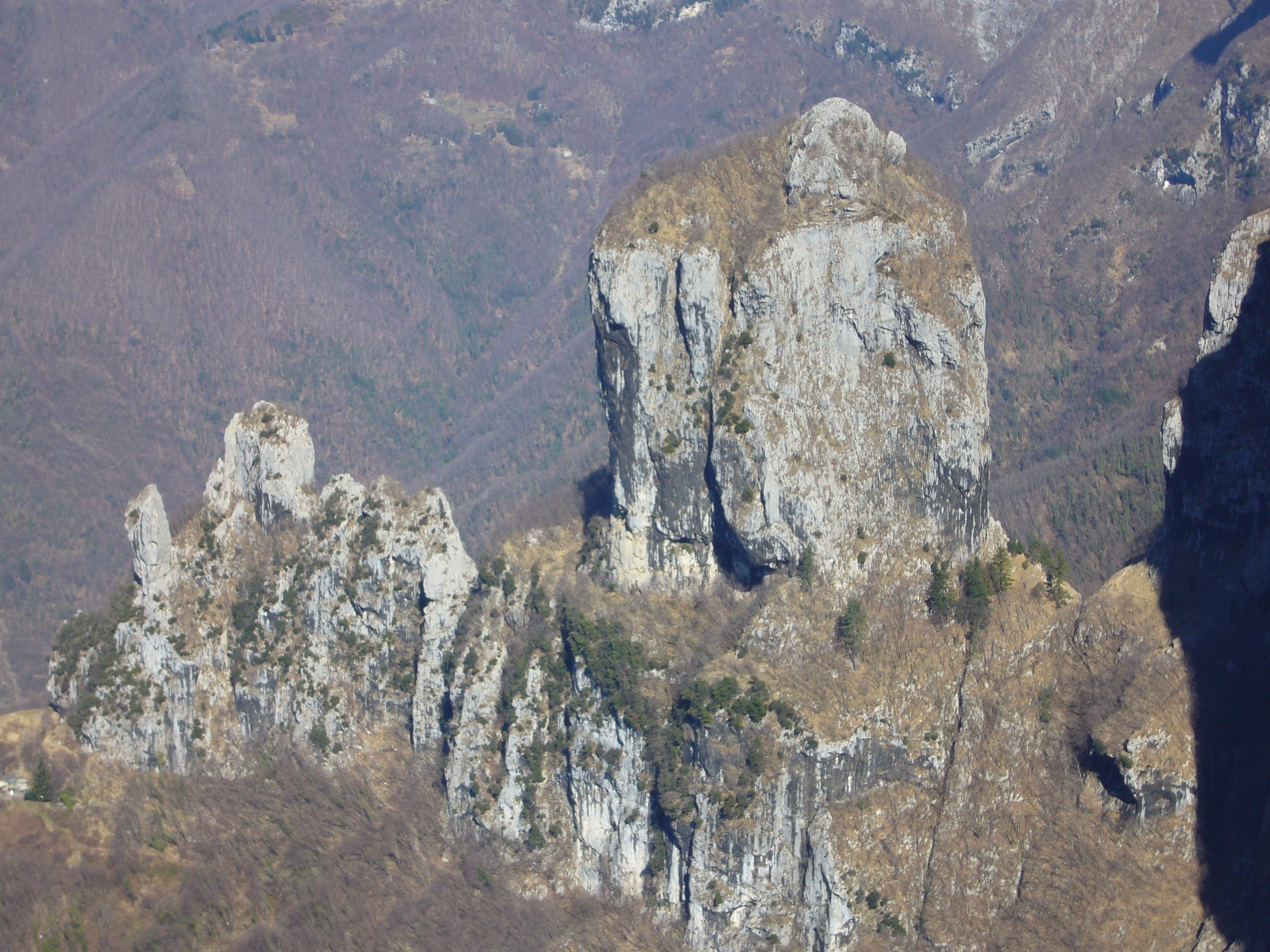
- Monte Procinto, seen from Monte Matanna

Highest point
- Elevation: 1,177 m (3,862 ft)
- Coordinates: 43.997532°N 10.334854°E

Geography
- Country: Italy
- Region: Tuscany
- Parent range: Alpi Apuane (in the Tuscan Subapennines)

The Monte Procinto is an Italian mountain ridge belonging to the Alpi Apuane chain, standing 1,177 meters above sea level. Located in upper Tuscany, in the Province of Lucca, it is part of the Parco naturale regionale delle Alpi Apuane; it is recognized as a Site of Community Importance with the identifier IT5120014 Monte Corchia - Le Panie and a locality of significant environmental interest within the EEC.

At the base of this mountain, there are several quarries of Carrara marble, heavily criticized by the No Cav movement.

== Characteristics ==
The mountain is situated in the southern part of the Alpi Apuane chain and lies at the center of the main ridge’s axis; it is very close to Monte Nona and is located between Monte Matanna and Pania della Croce.

The mountain is composed of calcareous dolomite and is small but highly distinctive due to its singular "panettone" shape, with perfectly vertical walls and a slightly convex summit; it stands over 150 meters from its base, around which runs a horizontal ledge called the “Cintura del Procinto.” All access routes to the summit are reserved for experienced mountaineers, except for a via ferrata to the south that can be traversed with maximum caution and safety, requiring minimal mountaineering knowledge.

Near the Procinto, but separated by the Foce dei Bimbi, there are three small vertical spires, popular among climbers, called the Bimbo Fasciato, the Piccolo Procinto, and the Bimba.

To the south, separated from Monte Procinto by the Foce del Procinto, is Monte Nona, standing 1,300 meters above sea level; its northern wall, facing the Procinto, is also of calcareous dolomite and is overhanging: indeed, in some points, the summit forms a roof that projects outward, beyond the vertical line of the lower wall, by 17 meters.

Monte Procinto can be accessed from the meadows on the southern slope of Monte Nona, near the Albergo Alto Matanna, reachable by car from Lucca, via a trail that first ascends to the Callare del Matanna pass, then descends to the base of the vertical wall of Monte Nona, traverses along the base of said wall, and finally reaches the Cintura del Procinto; from there, a small bridge leads to the via ferrata.

Alternatively, the Procinto can be reached by ascending from the village of Stazzema, passing near the Club Alpino Italiano’s “Forte dei Marmi” refuge, and joining the trail that traverses the base of the overhanging wall of the Nona.

From the summit of the Procinto, the view spans 360 degrees, toward Pania della Croce, Pania Secca, Monte Forato, the northern Versilia coast and the sea, Monte Nona, and Monte Matanna.

== Historical Curiosities ==
The Procinto, with its bold "panettone" shape, vertical walls, and rounded base, has been a challenge for mountaineers since the 19th century.

It was first climbed by woodcutters in the distant year of 1848.

In subsequent years, along the route followed by the first climbers, the managers of the Alpe della Grotta Refuge fixed a ladder, presumably made of chestnut wood, to the vertical wall of Monte Procinto.

From 1884, the Milanese engineer Aristide Bruni, a member of the Club Alpino Italiano in his city but also active at the Lucca Alpine Station, promoted and directed works that, using brackets and metal cables, led, in 1893, to the construction of the first via ferrata in Italy. This emulated the Austrians, who had already created two via ferratas: in 1843 on the Hoher Dachstein; in 1869 on the Grossglockner. The works at Procinto were largely funded by members of the Florence Section and the Lucca Alpine Station of the CAI.

The entire ferrata was restored and made safe in 2018 by the CAI Florence.

The poet Ludovico Ariosto, who in 1522 came to serve as Governor of the Garfagnana for the Estensi, dedicated a poem to it contained in the unpublished Cinque Canti of the Orlando Furioso.

At the summit, there is a tiny cavity that usually contains some water: much has been said about its cause. It may be due to the fact that the Procinto is very close to the coast; it faces Forte dei Marmi: thus, humid currents from the sea could condense on the cold rock, and meteoric water could collect in the cavity.

Very close to the Procinto along the northern ridge that connects it to the Gruppo delle Panie, there is the Monte Forato, formed by a large arch connecting two peaks. It can be crossed with caution. To the east of Monte Forato lies the Valle di Fornovolasco, a characteristic Apuan village near Lake Trombacco, once home to artisans who worked iron for the Duke of Modena, extracting it from small mines—still visible—at the base of Pania Secca (a bold calcareous peak that looms imposingly, with a drop of over 1,200 meters, over the small settlement).

From various panoramic points in the villages on the slopes of the Turrite di Gallicano valley and from Barga—on specific days of the year—the sun sets twice, first against the arch, then through the hole of Monte Forato; similarly, looking from the Versilia, the same phenomenon is visible at sunrise.

== See also ==
- Alpi Apuane

== Bibliography ==
- Giovannetti, Bruno (1998). Le Alpi Apuane un piccolo grande mondo [The Apuane Alps, a Small Great World] (in Italian). Florence: Le Lettere.
- Bradley, Frederick; Medda, Enrico (2004). Alpi Apuane (in Italian). Rome: Promorama.
- Ravera, F. (1990). Alpi Apuane (in Italian). Florence: Multigraphic.
- Bradley, Frederick; Medda, Enrico (1992). Alpi Apuane, Guida al Territorio del Parco [Alpi Apuane, Guide to the Park Territory] (in Italian). Pisa: Pacini Editore.
- Montagna, E.; Nerli, A.; Sabbatini, A. (1979). Alpi Apuane. Guida dei Monti d'Italia (in Italian). Milan: CAI-TCI.
- Barbieri, Guido (2008). "Ferrata del Procinto, Il piolo fisso" [Ferrata del Procinto, The Fixed Piton]. Rivista trimestrale Collana Meridiani Montagne (in Italian). VII (31). Rozzano (MI): Editoriale Domus S.p.a.
