= Villa Agnelli and Villa Pesenti =

Forte dei Marmi
- Comune
- Comune di Forte dei Marmi
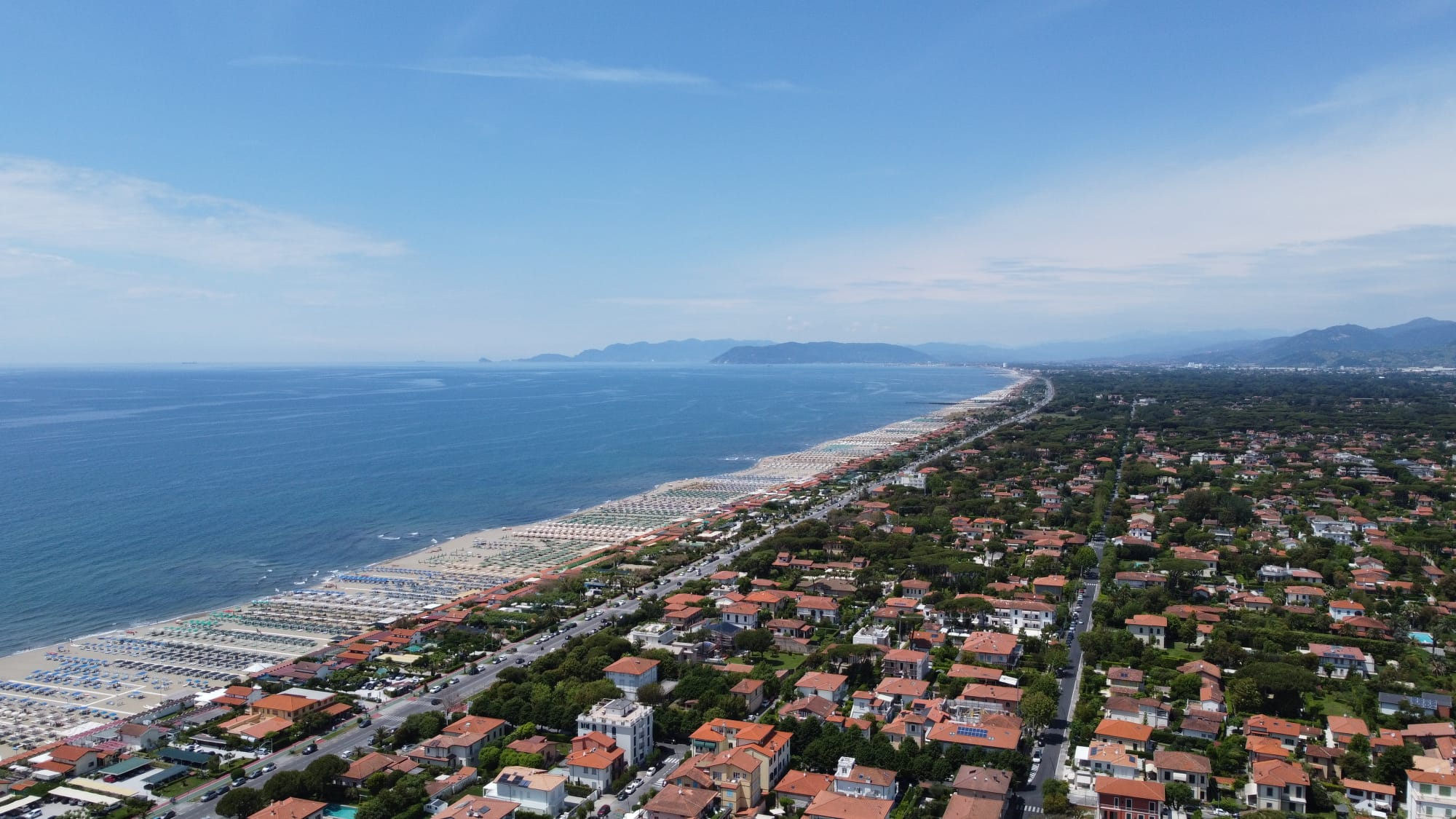

- Location within Italy Location within Tuscany
- Coordinates: 43°57′N 10°11′E
- Country: Italy
- Region: Tuscany
- Province: Lucca (LU)
- Time zone: UTC+1 (CET)
  - Summer (DST): UTC+2 (CEST)

Villa Agnelli and Villa Pesenti are two historical buildings in the seaside town of Forte dei Marmi in Tuscany, Italy. Forte dei Marmi is part of the area of Versilia in the north-western province of Lucca. It is situated on the shores of the Ligurian Sea. Today the villas form part of the 5-star Augustus Hotel & Resort.

== History ==
In the 1920s, wealthy families began building summer villas near the beach in Versilia. The Pesenti family villa was designed in 1939 by renowned architect Osvaldo Borsani. It is a good example of Rationalist architecture, embellished with typical Mediterranean finishes. In 1953 the family added an extra floor to the Villa Pesenti, transforming it into the only Luxury Hotel in Versilia for more than twenty years. Around the main structure, seven villas were built in the following years, by different artists and architects. Augusta Pesenti eventually developed these into an albergo diffuso (hotel in multiple buildings), which took her name (Augustus Hotel).

The nearby Villa Costanza, built for Admiral Enrico Costantino Morin in the early 1900s, was purchased in 1926 by Edoardo Agnelli (1892-1935), son of Senator Giovanni Agnelli, founder of the FIAT motor car company. This property became known as Villa Agnelli, the summer home for over thirty years for the Agnelli family from Turin. The family commissioned a private underground passage giving direct access to the beach, without having to cross the crowded boulevard. This feature is still available today for guests of the hotel. Details of this period are recounted in the autobiography of one of Edoardo’s children, Susanna Agnelli “Vestivamo alla marinara” (“We always wore Sailor Suits”).

Edoardo Agnelli died in a plane crash in 1935, aged 43. His eldest son, Gianni, served as the head of FIAT from 1966 to 2003. Susanna was the first woman to serve as Italian Minister of Foreign Affairs. When Villa Agnelli was sold to the Maschietto family in 1969, it became known as the Augustus Lido, part of the Augustus Hotel & Resort, along with the other villas set in parkland beside the beach.

== Today ==
Today the Augustus Hotel & Resort consists of 12 separate villas. In 2024 two new five-star villas were included: Villa Ala Bianca and Villa Ala Anita, named respectively after Maschietto’s daughter and one of his cousins. The most recent to be included, Villa Radici, is scheduled to open in the summer of 2025. It was the former home of Barbara Radici, sister of Augusta Pesenti.

== Famous people ==
According to the hotel's website, many important artists, actors, sportsmen and prominent cultural figures have spent their vacation in the villas of the Augustus Hotel & Resort: Jimi Hendrix, Charlton Heston, Oriana Fallaci, Eugenio Montale, Francesco Messina, Mario Monicelli, Paul Anka, Vittorio Gassman and many others.
