= Ardinghi =

Ardinghi is an Italian surname. Notable people with the surname include:

- Angelo Ardinghi (1850–1897), Italian wood engraver
- Massimo Ardinghi (born 1971), Italian tennis player
