= Studio Simi =

Historic house museum in Lucca, Italy

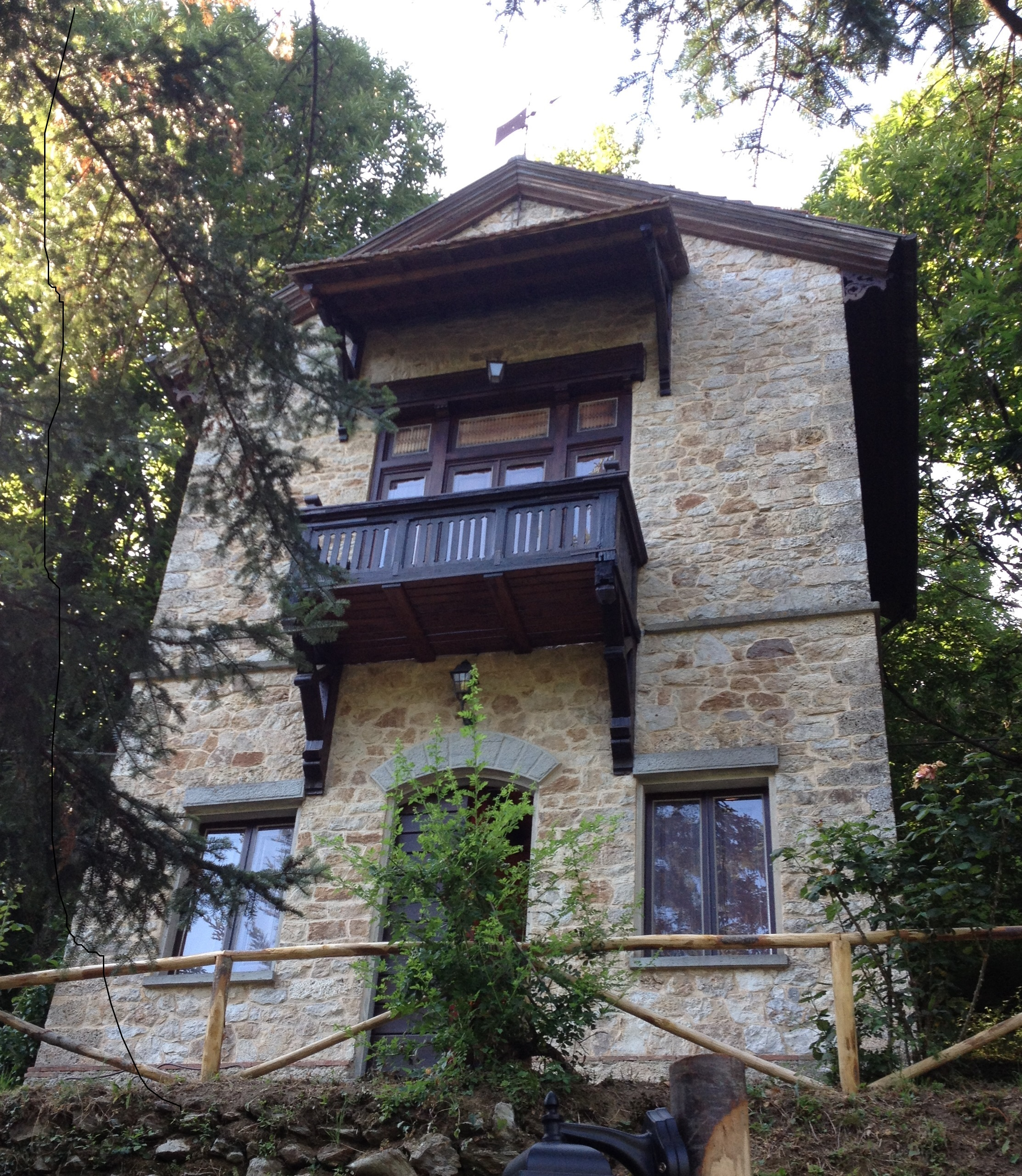
Lo Studio Simi.

Studio Simi, home of Italian painters Filadelfo and Nera Simi, is an historic house museum dedicated to them. The building is located in the town of Scala di Stazzema, in the province of Lucca, Italy.

The painter Filadelfo Simi, around the years 1885 - 1890, designed and built the house in Victorian style, a place where to work on large canvases that characterize its production of that period. The house has come down to us well preserved, full of furnishings and works.
