= Retignano =

Retignano Retinius
- Frazione
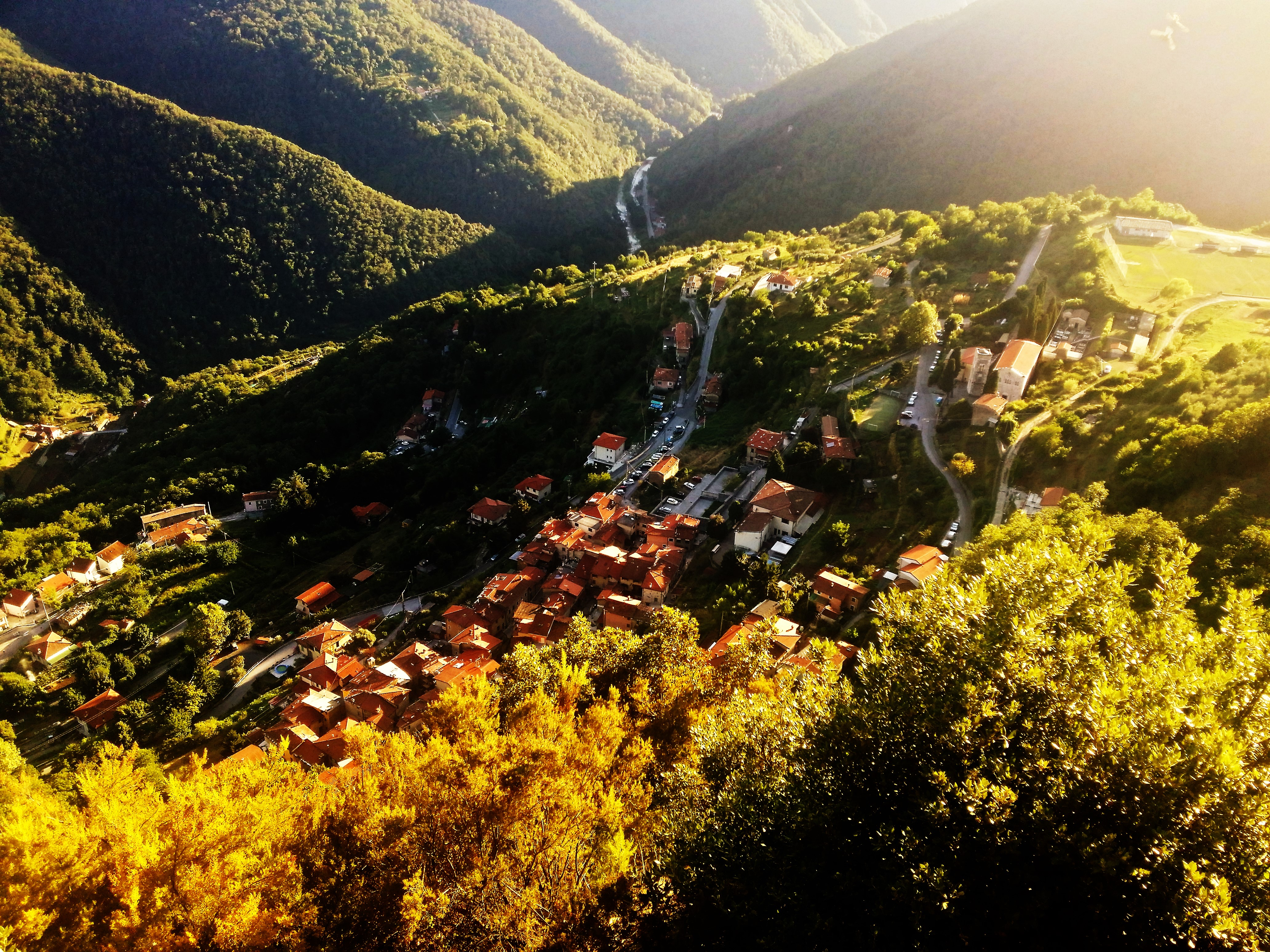
- The village in summer 2015

- Location of Retignano in Italy
- Coordinates: 44°0′18″N 10°16′23″E
- Country: Italy
- Region: Tuscany
- Province: Lucca (LU)
- Comune: Stazzema
- Elevation: 430 m (1,410 ft)

Population (2014)
  - Total: 381
- Demonym: Retignanesi
- Time zone: UTC+1 (CET)
  - Summer (DST): UTC+2 (CEST)
- Postal code: 55040
- Dialing code: 0584
- Patron saint: St. Peter
- Saint day: June 29
- Website: Official website

Retignano is a village of about 400 inhabitants, located on a hill in the historical Versilia region of Tuscany, Italy. The inhabitants are known as the Retignanesi.

It was originally a small settlement that belonged to the Liguri Apuani, a small community from northern Europe. It joined the Roman Empire in 177 BCE and became one of the most flourishing and developed Roman settlements in the Apuan Alps. It was mainly used as a hideout in the event of an imminent attack from the sea, since it was a known stronghold of sighting of the enemies coming from the sea and strategic point of supply of timber, various extractive materials and marble. After a period of independence in the guise of a “little municipality”, which lasted several centuries. In 1776 the Grand Duke Pietro Leopoldo removed this title from the village, subjecting it to the dominion of Lucca, whose province Retignano is now part of. Retignano returned to prosperity in the second half of the nineteenth century thanks to the opening of the marble quarries, mining sites of the bardiglio fiorito, appreciated especially by the English who financed the project. Between the two world wars, the village experienced rapid depopulation caused by emigration to large cities or to foreign countries, particularly North America or Argentina. After being besieged by the Germans and exploited for its enviable position, it was reclaimed by the American soldiers who placed one of their main bases during the advancement phase at the Gothic Line.

== History ==
=== First settlements: the Roman conquest ===
The origins of the village date back to the twenty years between 560 and 580 CE, in which the militias of Rome fought against the Ligurian Apuans, a population of the Apuan Alps. It is believed that even then there was a small group of huts surrounded by many fields, some of which were shared with the nearby settlements of Terrinca and Levigliani, where they have found traces of this population. Retignano shared a small necropolis with Levigliani.

For many centuries the Ligurian Apuans fought against the Romans to keep their possessions in Versilia. Most of the time they suffered heavy defeats because they were not have advanced weaponry. However, historians believe that not all of them were deported in southern Italy during the period from 177 to 155 BCE, probably because Rome was more interested in restraining these nomads away from the coast and the valley of Magra river, since they were considered property of the Romans, and the Apuans were only deemed as a threat to safety of the port of Luni and its trading importance.

The Ligurian Apuans, or simply Apuans, were a population divided into various tribes, called Nomens (names) by Roman historians; one of them settled between the mountains of Mont'Alto, where they lived a semi-nomadic life and used the area of Retignano as a settlement from spring until early winter. In more sheltered areas and clearings like Gordici and Valimoni, about 700 meters above the sea level, there were the remains of smaller settlements called by the Apuans luki (which became loci in Latin). In case of war, they always had access to a fortified summit from which they could see the horizon, and could warn their compatriots of the enemy's arrival. For Retignano, this summit coincides with the top of the mountain Castello (lit. 'castle'), whose etymology probably is to relate with this habit. It is believed that they were the Vasates, inhabitants of Basati, a place in front of Retignano.

After their defeat in 6th century CE, the Ligurian Apuans were deported or expelled from Versilia. Their domains in Retignano, Levigliani and Seravezza were divided into colonies first, with Luni as the main center for Seravezza and Querceta, and Lucca for the mountain areas of Stazzema and Pietrasanta. The colonies were then divided into villages, which were built on hills. Each of them became a Roman camp and took its name from its founder or governor. The current name of Retignano comes from the time of Roman rule.

Some research on a document dated (31 August 855 CE) trace the name to Retinio, who was given the Roman district of the country which became Ratiniana, Ratignano, San Pietro di Retignano and finally Retignano (sometimes misspelled Ritignano). The reference to the patron dates back to 700 CE, when Christianity became more widespread throughout the peninsula and Retignano too. The village, which was under the control of Rome, took its same patron (St. Peter). On July 1, 932 CE, the village, called Ratignano as evidenced by certain records of the Archbishop of Lucca, was donated by the Lombard king Lothair to Lucca.

=== 1700 ===
The 18th century began with lots of new opportunities and a new-found economic prosperity that allowed the comunello to keep ruling for a while. In 1712 the popular council's representatives comprised 50 people and it can be considered the first real democratic administration. At the time, there were four masons, six weavers, two insiders mills, a polishing and those who worked in carpentry and sawmills water.

Retignano and Levigliani's prosperity lasted until June 17, 1776, when the Grand Duke of Tuscany Pietro Leopoldo eliminated the comunelli and the government seat shifted from Retignano to Ruosina.

=== 1800 ===
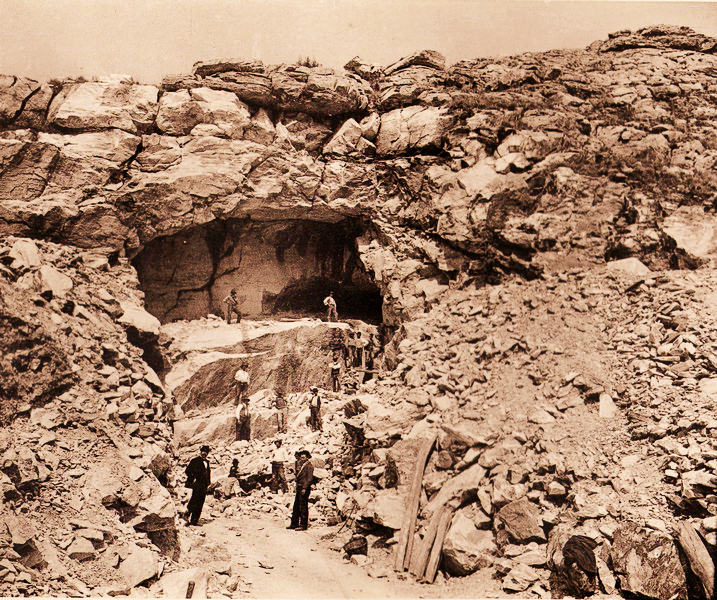
Marble quarries in 1916

In 1820 a group of French and British entrepreneurs visited the Versilia in Tuscany. While the French Boumond family settled in Riomagno, Seravezza, the Englishman James Beresford (in the archives often referred to as Belessforte) and his partner Gybrin preferred Retignano. With the help of the inhabitants, in the summer of 1820 they found in the Canaletta ("little channel") cave a fine marble available only in the mountains of Retignano, an unusual mix of different types of local marble ("variegated", bice and flourished bardiglio). They started a mining campaign and immediately sent several blocks of marble to Britain by sea, presumably to London, where some monuments are made of Versilian marble, such as Marble Arch. The sample sent to the salesmen in England was immediately appreciated by the British, who decided to start a business with Retignano. In 1821 Beresford and Grybrin, with local support, founded a company and they rented a quarry, Messette, from Francesco Guglielmi for nine years after paying 6,000 crowns. The inhabitants of Retignano were particularly active in contributing to the recovery of the marble industry in Versilia, and reopened quarries also in the localities of Mount Gabro, Ajola, Gordici and Messette, all of which were part of the quarry complex in Montalto, Retignano. In 1845 the Retignanesi argued that the British entrepreneur William Walton harmed the lands used for grazing and the collection of firewood and chestnuts. They opposed him in order to keep the monopoly to Beresford and his companions. When Italy was unified in 1861, the villagers participated in the excavations and the economy became mostly linked to marble, with a gradual reduction of half of the cultivation of chestnuts and a reduction in land used to grow olive trees, potatoes and tomatoes.

=== Twentieth century ===
==== 1944 ====
In the summer of 1944, at the height of World War II, Nazism extended to inland Versilia, including the village of Retignano and its surroundings, which were exploited for their strategic position from which the whole valley and the Tyrrhenian Sea horizon can be observed. The whole area was part of the Gothic Line that was used by the Nazi soldiers to rule over central Italy. In late July 1944, Nazis spread an order to expel the Retignanesi in order to oust the residents from their homes and flush the partisans who took refuge in the woods, as well as facilitate the passage of the Gothic Line, and then proceed with the bombardment of the mountain.

Saturday, July, 29th 1944
Yesterday, at almost 6 pm, the Germans spread sheets reporting displacement order for the inhabitants. Time: until the first of August 1944. [...] All the people I know run away carrying with them only few things; the Germans start shooting with their gun machines [...], they already blasted two houses [...] How many people riversed in the streets, somebody's crying, somebody's screaming, calling, asking for a help. The German Command headquarter, where they issued the displacement sheet, was plenty of people and their stuff. Many cannot manage to avoid the queue and demand for their safety pass.

— Bettina Federigi, an extract from her journal published in Versilia Linea Gotica, an historical research written by Fabrizio Federigi.

== Demographic figures ==
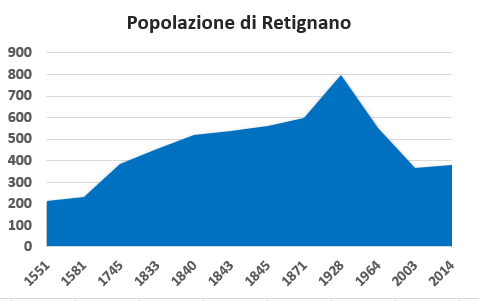
Retignano inhabitants, research by Lorenzo Vannoni

Year	Inhabitants
1551	213
1745	386
1835	455
1840	519
1843	536
1845	559
1928	800
1964	550
2000	less than 400
2014	about 350

== Holy celebration of "Dead Christ" ==
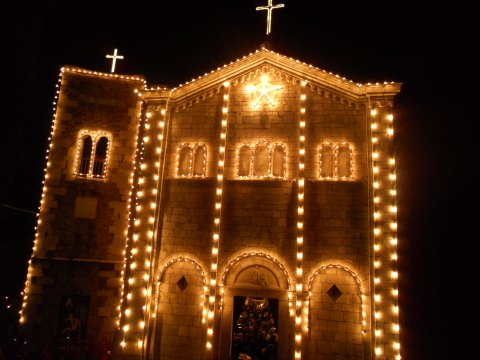
The Church during the celebration in 2014.

The procession of Dead Christ was welcomed by the community of villages like Retignano and Terrinca. Documents about the origins of the celebration are damaged and no longer readable; sometimes the sources are inaccessible or not available without a special permission. To solve the problem, Lorenzo Vannoni, one of the inhabitants of Retignano, asked the elders to talk about the celebrations and share their knowledge.

People walk slowly up and down the hill of Retignano, following the illuminated path. Someone carries the statue of Jesus, while readers quote some Biblic extracts or make the attendants reflect on some topics. The Gospel and the musicians serve as accompaniment while everyone is asked to hold a candle in their hands.

== See also ==
- Volegno
- Sant'Anna di Stazzema
- Chapel of Our Lady's Assumption into Heaven
