= Fabbiano, Tuscany =

Place in italy

Coordinates: 44°00′32″N 10°13′35″E

Fabbiano
- Frazione
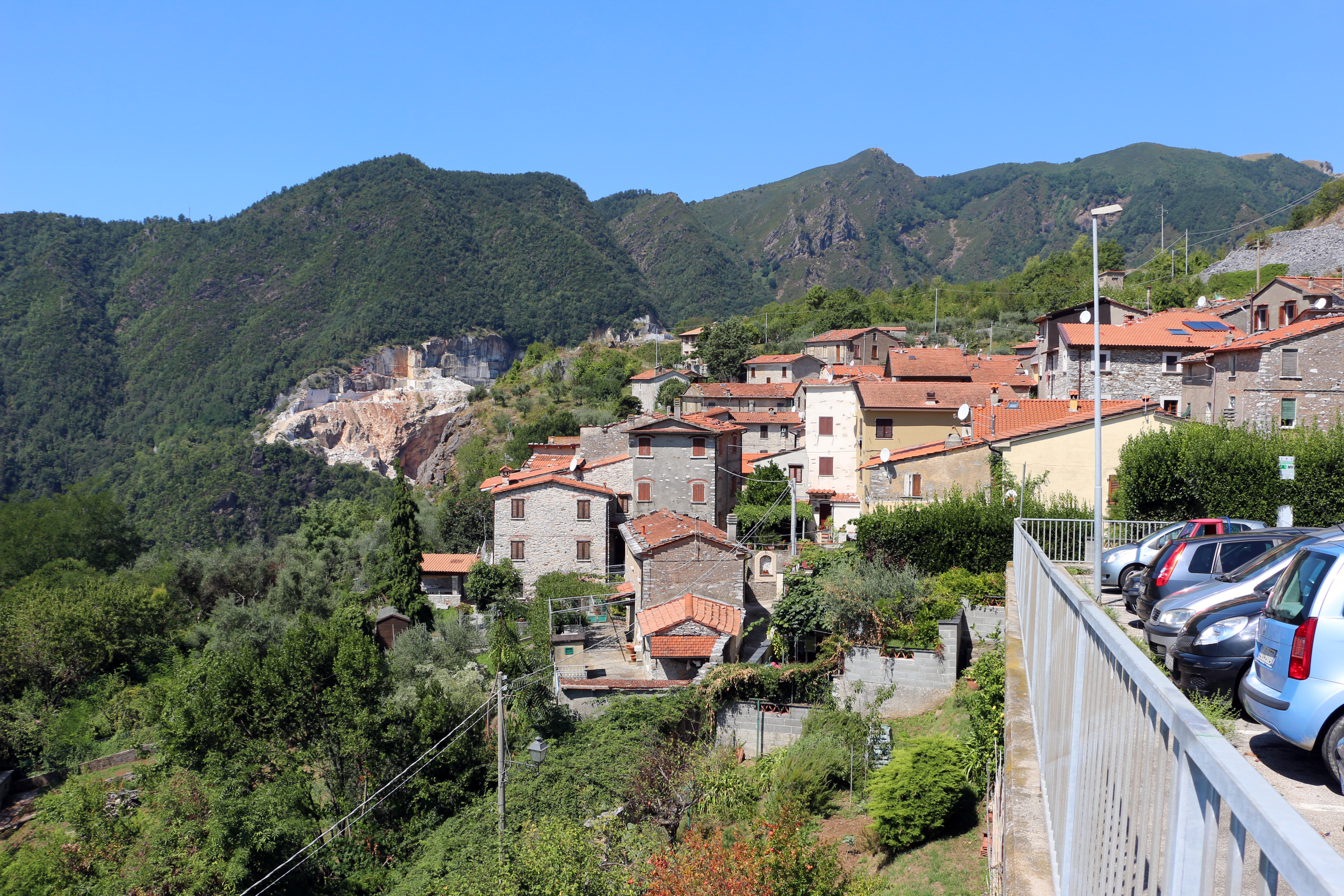

- Location of Fabbiano in Italy
- Country: Italy
- Region: Tuscany
- Province: Province of Lucca
- Comune: Seravezza

Area
  - Total: 4 km^{2} (1.5 sq mi)

Population
  - Total: 96
  - Density: 24/km^{2} (62/sq mi)
- Time zone: UTC+1 (CET)
  - Summer (DST): UTC+2 (CEST)
- Postal code: 55042
- Patron saint: St. Hermes Martyr
- Saint day: 28 August

Fabbiano is a frazione of Seravezza, in the province of Lucca, Italy. It is a small hamlet located in the Versilia mountains in Tuscany and has a population of just 96.

The population is particularly young given that 91 of the 96 inhabitants are of school age, 40 of whom are at least 15 years old.

Quarries around the town were an important source of white marble in the 17th century, and the production of tiles in Fabbiano led to its inhabitants being called piastrellai (tile makers in English).

== History ==
Fabbiano was founded in 1500, when Michelangelo discovered the Bardiglio quarry, from which marble was used in the construction of Florence Cathedral.

In 2016 a landslide hit the area leaving the villages of Fabbiano and Azzano isolated.

== Monuments ==
- Church of San Martino alla Cappella, built during the 11th century and enlarged during the first half of the 1500s is linked to the name of Michelangelo, especially the name of the rose window nicknamed Occhio di Michelangelo ("Michelangelo's eye") This last place is very important from a historical point of view, around 1500 with the marbles of the Bardaglino quarry Michelangelo Buonarroti built the chapel of Fabbiano, the particular part is the rose window of the chapel nicknamed the eye of Michelangelo.
