= Borsani (surname) =

Borsani is a surname. Notable people with the surname include:

- Osvaldo Borsani (1911–1985), Italian architect and furniture designer
- Pierina Borsani (1909–1960), Italian basketball player
- Luis Gustavo Borsani, Argentinian politician
