= Monte Forato =

Mountain in Italy

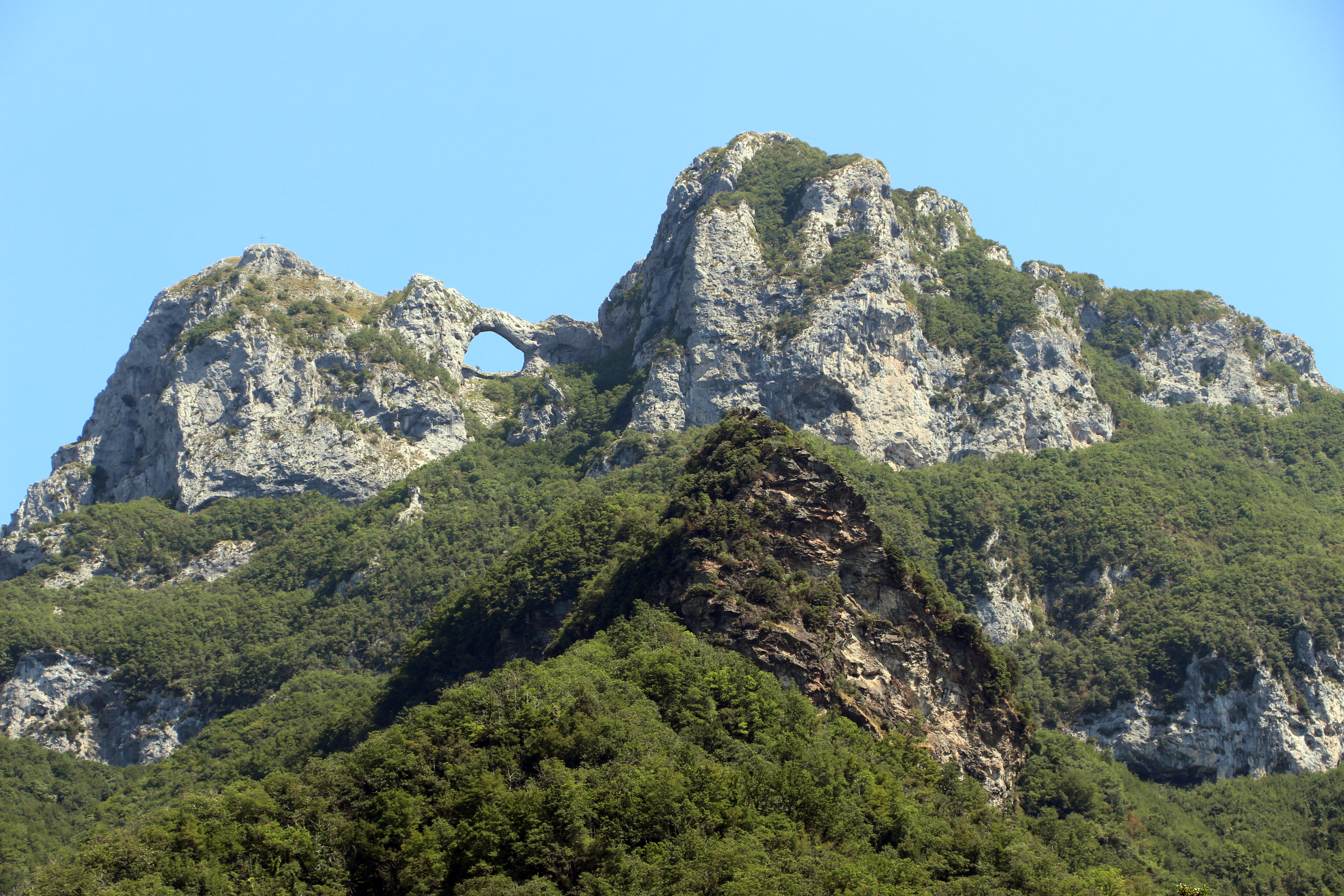

Highest point
- Elevation: 1,230 m (4,040 ft)
- Coordinates: 44°00′51″N 10°20′06″E

Geography
- Location: Tuscany, Italy
- Parent range: Alpi Apuane

Monte Forato is a mountain (1,230 m) in the Alpi Apuane, in Tuscany, central Italy.

It is formed by two peaks of similar altitude, connected by a natural arch which has given the group its name (meaning "Holed Mountain" in Italian). The hole, nearly circular in shape, has a height of c. 26 m, while the arch itself is some 8 m thick. The arch can be seen from both Versilia and Garfagnana valleys at the two sides of the Monte Forato.

Looking from some spots, the arch creates an effect of double sunset (or dawn, like on 22 June from Volegno), when the sun falls between the arch, soon reappearing for a short while in the hole below.
