= Marco Balderi =

Italian orchestra conductor

Marco Balderi is an Italian orchestra conductor who began his career after winning the International Competitions of Salzburg and Alexandria. He toured Austria, China, Korea, France, Germany, Japan, Poland, Romania, Russia, Spain and Switzerland. He is known for acclaimed productions of Madama Butterfly at the Deutsche Oper in Berlin, and at the Opéra Bastille in Paris in January 2006, as well as Georges Bizet's The Pearl Fishers in New Delhi. Balderi has studied numerous symphonic works, including all the symphonies of Beethoven, Brahms, Tchaikovsky, Mozart and Schumann, and over 200 operas, forty of which he has conducted. He has also studied 650 sacred and profane vocal works.

== History ==
Born in Seravezza, Marco Balderi completed his studies in piano at the L. Boccherini Musical Institute of Lucca, before entering the L. Cherubini Conservatory of Florence, where he obtained the diplomas of choir conductor, harpsichord and organ. He then entered the S.Cecilia Conservatory of Rome, where he completed studies of orchestra conductor, and obtained the degree with honors.

== Collaborations ==
Between 1984 and 1989, Balderi worked as assistant to many prominent conductors, such as C. Abbado, R. Chailly, C.M. Giulini, J. Levine, Z. Mehta, R. Muti, G. Patanè, W. Sawallisch, in important theatres such as the Teatro alla Scala and the Salzburg Festival. From 1992 to 1996, Marco Balderi conducted the choir of the Florence Opera House, which gave him the opportunity to collaborate with Z. Mehta and S. Bychkov in numerous productions. He also gained a deep knowledge of the opera vocality. He performed with such important singers as Pietro Ballo, Renato Bruson, José Cura, Mariella Devia, Ghena Dimitrova, Barbara Frittoli, Nicolai Gedda, Nicolai Ghiaurov, Giuseppe Giacomini, Nicola Martinucci, Mariana Nicolesco, Leo Nucci, Luciano Pavarotti, and Cesare Siepi.

== Orchestra conducting ==
Balderi has conducted the following orchestras : the Radio France Orchestra, the New Symphony Orchestra of Boston, the Rai Symphonic Orchestras of Milan, Rome and Turin, the Radio and Television Orchestra of Italian Switzerland, the Metropolitan Orchestra of Tokyo, the Orchestras of the Cagliari, Bologna, Rome and Verona Theatres, the Symphonic Radiotelevision Orchestra of Moscow, the European Orchestra of Vienna, the Radiotelevision Orchestra of Bucharest, the S.Cecilia Conservatory of Rome, the Padova Chamber Orchestra, the Deutsche Oper orchestra of Berlin, and the St. Gallen Symphonic Orchestra.

Marco Balderi has served as artistic director for 12 seasons at the Ongakoyoku Festival of Nijgata in Japan, and two years at the prestigious Puccini Festival of Torre del Lago. He is a guest faculty member at universities, where he lectures limited courses in opera and music theory, in the Italian language.

== Awards ==
- Salzburg Conducting Competition
- International Competition of Alessandria
