= Sant'Anna di Stazzema =

Sant'Anna
- Frazione
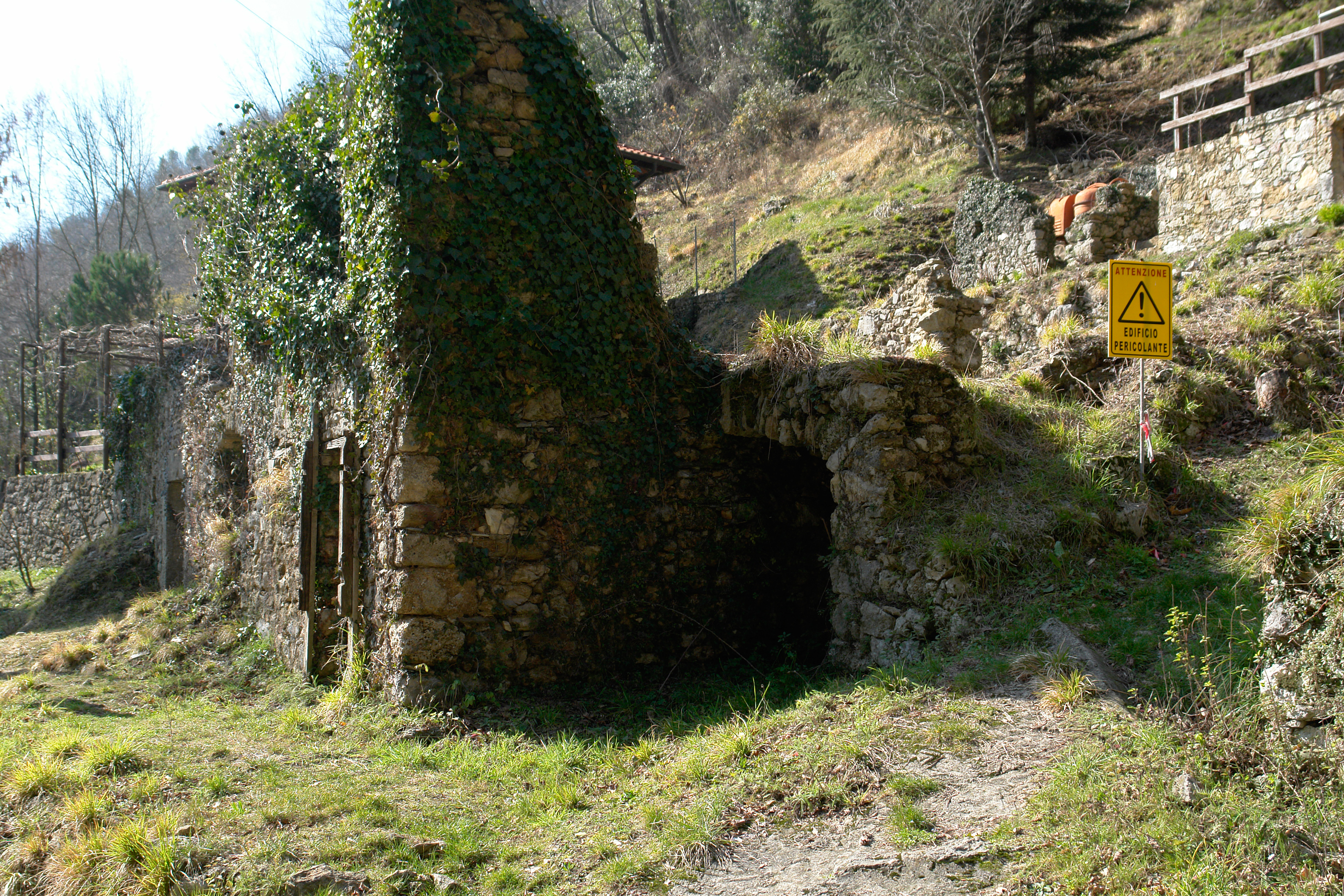
- Ruins of the village in 2008

- Location of Sant'Anna in Italy
- Coordinates: 43°58′27″N 10°16′25″E
- Country: Italy
- Region: Tuscany
- Province: Lucca (LU)
- Comune: Stazzema
- Elevation: 660 m (2,170 ft)

Population (2014)
  - Total: 27
- Time zone: UTC+1 (CET)
  - Summer (DST): UTC+2 (CEST)
- Postal code: 55040
- Dialing code: (+39) 0584
- Patron saint: St. Anne
- Website: Official website

Sant'Anna di Stazzema, officially Sant'Anna, is a village in Tuscany, Italy. Administratively, it is a frazione of the comune of Stazzema, in the province of Lucca.

== History ==
In 1944, it was the site of a notorious Nazi crime against humanity committed by a part of German 16th SS Panzergrenadier Division Reichsführer-SS during World War II. In the morning of 12 August, about 560 villagers and refugees (including 130 children) were murdered and their bodies burnt in a scorched earth policy action. After the war, the village was only partially rebuilt.

The massacre gained notoriety from 1994. During an investigation of the military attorney Antonino Intelisano, 695 files about war crimes in Italy during World War II were found in a wooden cabinet, known as the Armadio della vergogna (armoire of shame), located in a palace of Rome.

Since 2000, it has been the site of the Italian National Park of Peace (Parco Nazionale della Pace) with memorials and a museum dedicated to the massacre.

== Geography ==
Located in the Apuan Alps, Sant'Anna is a mountain village that is 12 km far from Pietrasanta and 16 from its Marina, on the Mediterranean Sea; 18 km from Viareggio, 24 from Massa and 37 from Carrara. The nearest train station is that of Pietrasanta on the Pisa-Genoa line and the nearest motorway exit is "Viareggio-Camaiore" on the A12.

== Gallery ==
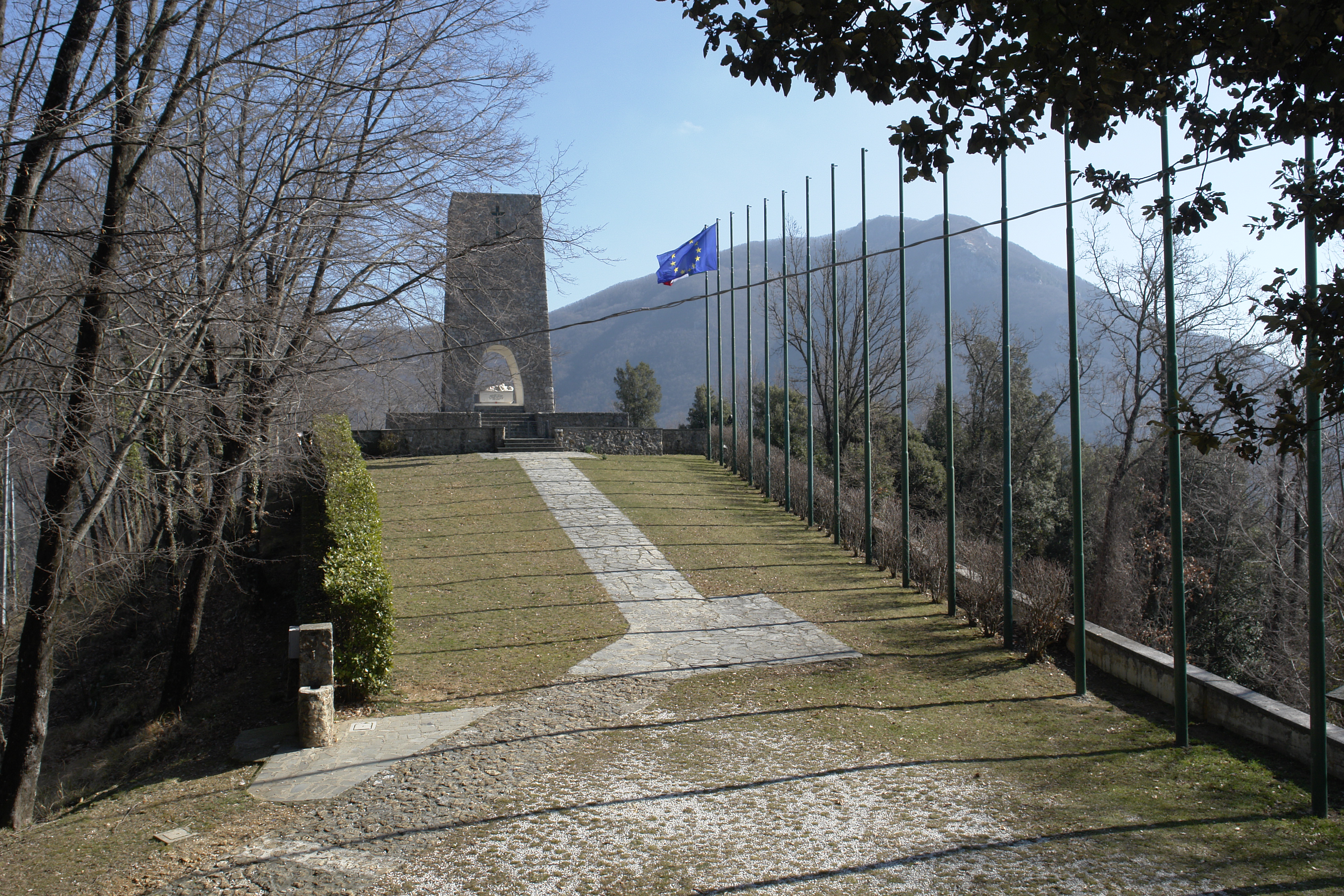
Ossuary and monument to the victims of the massacre

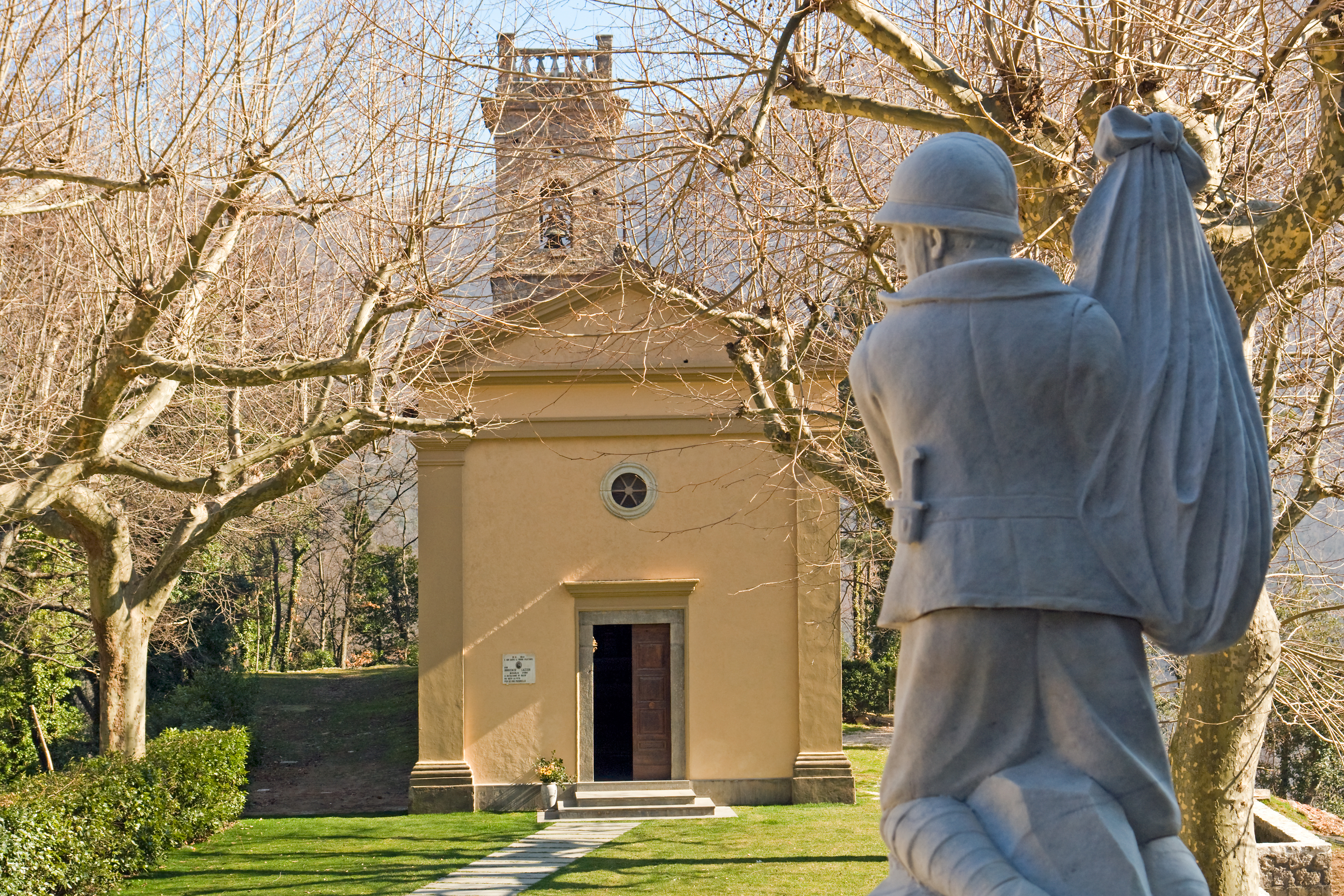
Village church

== Popular culture ==
The massacre inspired the novel Miracle at St. Anna by James McBride, and Spike Lee's film (2008) of the same title that was based on it.

== See also ==
- Retignano
- Volegno
