= Anne Paolucci =

American dramatist

- Born: Anne Attura; July 31, 1926; Rome, Italy
- Died: July 15, 2012 (aged 85); New York City, U.S.
- Education: Barnard College (BA); Columbia University (MA, PhD)
- Writing career
- Notable works: Translation of Machiavelli's Mandragola (1957); From Tension to Tonic: The Plays of Edward Albee (1972)

Anne Paolucci (July 31, 1926 – July 15, 2012) was an Italian-American writer, scholar, and educator. She was a research professor and chair of the English Department at St. John's University in New York City, and a prolific writer who published plays, short stories, novels, poetry, literary criticism, and translations.

== Biography ==
=== Early life and education ===
She was born on July 31, 1926, in Rome, Italy. At the age of eight, she moved to New York City with her widowed mother and two siblings. She attended Barnard College, graduating with a B.A. in English in 1947. She studied Italian literature under Giuseppe Prezzolini and Dino Bigongiari at Columbia University, receiving her M.A. in 1950. She spent a year as a Fulbright Scholar at the University of Naples Federico II. Her doctoral dissertation on The Women in Dante's Divine Comedy and Spenser's Faerie Queene earned her a Woodbridge Honorary Fellowship, and she received a Ph.D. in comparative literature from Columbia in 1963.

=== Career ===
Paolucci taught at the City University of New York before joining the faculty of St. John's University in 1969, as the university's first research professor. She chaired the English department for ten years, and in 1982, became director of the doctor of arts degree program in English. For two years, she was a Fulbright lecturer on American Drama at the University of Naples. At the invitation of various universities and governments, she traveled the world lecturing on literary topics.

In addition to her teaching and scholarly work, Paolucci wrote plays, mystery novels, and award-winning poetry. Her plays have been produced in the United States and internationally. Her first full-length play, The Short Season (1966), was translated into German in 2003 for production in Austria.

In 1985, President Ronald Reagan appointed her to the Fellowship Board of the National Graduate Fellows Program. She received an honorary degree from Lehman College, and was recognized by the Italian government for translating and editing a selection of poems by Giacomo Leopardi. The Order of the Sons of Italy in America honored her with the Elana Cornaro Award in 1993, and the Golden Lion Award in 1997. In 1997 she was chosen by Governor George Pataki to serve on the CUNY board of trustees. Her play about Christopher Columbus won recognition from the U.S. Christopher Columbus Quincentennial Jubilee Commission, and her 1995 poetry collection, Queensboro Bridge and Other Poems, was nominated for a Pulitzer Prize.

Paolucci served as president of the Pirandello Society of America for seventeen years. She founded the Council on National Literatures, an educational foundation for multicomparative literary studies, and edited the Review of National Literatures from 1970 to 2001. She also had a television panel show, Magazines in Focus.

=== Personal life ===
She was married to Dr. Henry Paolucci (1921–1999), a professor at St. John's University, and a fellow Italian immigrant. She lived with him in Beechhurst, Queens, New York. She died in New York City on July 15, 2012.

== Works ==
=== Author ===
- The Short Season (1966)
- From Tension to Tonic: The Plays of Edward Albee (1972)
- Pirandello's Theater: The Recovery of the Modern Stage for Dramatic Art (1974)
- Riding the Mast Where it Swings: Poems (1980)
- Cipango! A Brief Historical Account of the Dramatic Reversals in the Life of Christopher Columbus (1987)
- Do Me a Favor and Other Short Stories (2001)
- Hegelian Literary Perspectives (2002)
- In Wolf's Clothing: A Mystery Novel (2003)
- Slow Dance to Samarra: A Mystery Novel (2005)
- The Plays and Fiction of Luigi Pirandello: Selected Essays (2005)
- The Women in Dante's Divine Comedy and Spenser's Faerie Queene (2005)
- Dante Revisited: Essays (2008)

=== Translator ===
- Mandragola by Niccolò Machiavelli (1957)
- Selected Poems by Giacomo Leopardi (2003)

=== Editor or contributor ===
- Hegel on Tragedy by Georg Hegel (2001)
- Dante's Gallery of Rogues: Paintings of Dante's Inferno by Vincenzo R. Latella (2001)
- Dante: Beyond the Commedia (2004)
- Backgrounds of the Divine Comedy: A Series of Lectures by Dino Bigongiari (2005)
- Review of National Literatures: Selected Essays (1970-2001) (2006)
- Readings in the Divine Comedy: A Series of Lectures by Dino Bigongiari (2006)
- Italian-American Perspectives with Ann Merlino (2007)
