= Dino Bigongiari =

Dino Bigongiari (March 22, 1879 – September 5, 1965) was an Italian-American medievalist and Dante expert. He was the Da Ponte Professor of Italian at Columbia University.

== Biography ==
Bigongiari was born in Seravezza, Italy. He came to the United States at a young age and attended public schools in Brooklyn. He then earned his B.A. from Columbia University in 1902 and began teaching at Columbia since 1904 as an assistant in Latin without salary. He took a leave of absence from Columbia and served in the Italian Army during World War I as a mounted artillery officer.

He became the Da Ponte Professor of Italian in 1929. As a professor at Columbia, Bigongiari was a founder of Casa Italiana. He was also the chair of the Italian department at Columbia during the 1930s and was criticized for his ties to Italian fascism.

The New York Times noted that he "eschewed every convenient means of academic advancement" such earning advanced degrees and publishing academic papers. Nevertheless, he gained prominence in academic circles and was respected for his work on Dante, Plutarch, Augustine of Hippo, and Thomas Aquinas, which were published in a 1964 essay collection. He received an honorary Doctor of Letters in 1955 from Columbia.

His students at Columbia included Italian-American writer and dramatist Anne Paolucci.

Bigongiari retired from teaching in 1950.

== Personal life and family ==
He died on September 5, 1965, in Seravezza. He married Glays Van Brunt in 1930. His cousin, Gino Bigongiari, was also a professor at Columbia University and a scholar on Dante.
