= Volegno =

- Frazione
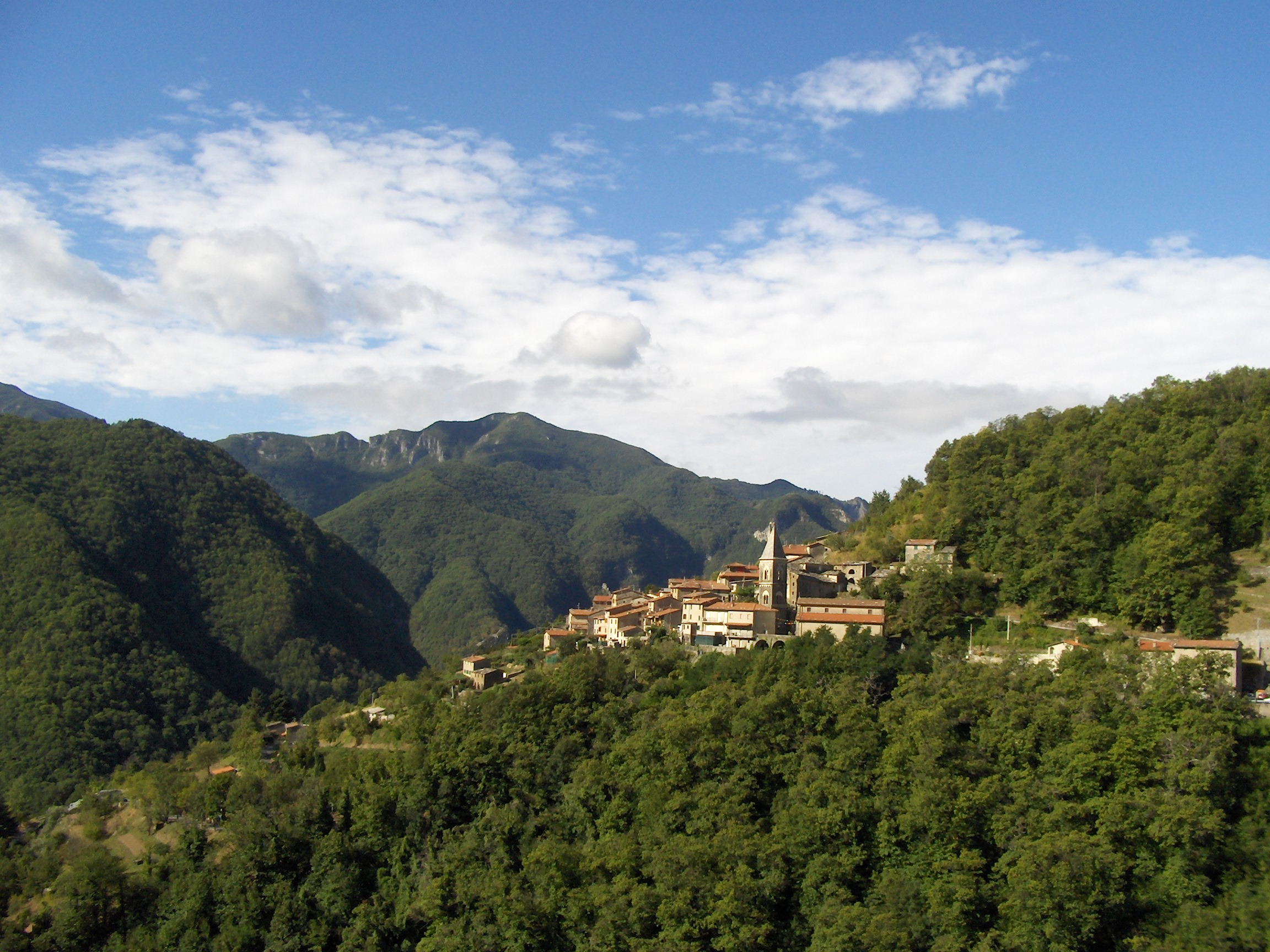

- Location of Volegno in Italy
- Coordinates: 44°0′22″N 10°18′25″E
- Country: Italy
- Region: Tuscany
- Province: Lucca (LU)
- Comune: Stazzema
- Elevation: 430 m (1,410 ft)

Population (2014)
  - Total: 65
- Demonym: Volegnesi
- Time zone: UTC+1 (CET)
  - Summer (DST): UTC+2 (CEST)
- Postal code: 55040
- Dialing code: (+39) 0584

Volegno is a village in Tuscany in central Italy. Administratively, it is a frazione of the comune of Stazzema, in the province of Lucca. Located at 430 m over the sea level in the Alpi Apuane Regional Park, it has 65 inhabitants.

== Overview ==
Volegno is home to a church of Santa Maria delle Grazie, which has some 16th-century paintings. The hamlet's economy has always been essentially based on the extraction of the so-called Pietra di Volegno or Cipollino stone, which ceased in the 20th century. Current activities include production of chestnut and tourism.

Volegno is also renowned for an astronomical events occurring each June 22, during which the rising sun can be seen into a natural hole-shaped formation in the nearby Monte Forato (which means "Holed Mountain" in Italian).

== Gallery ==
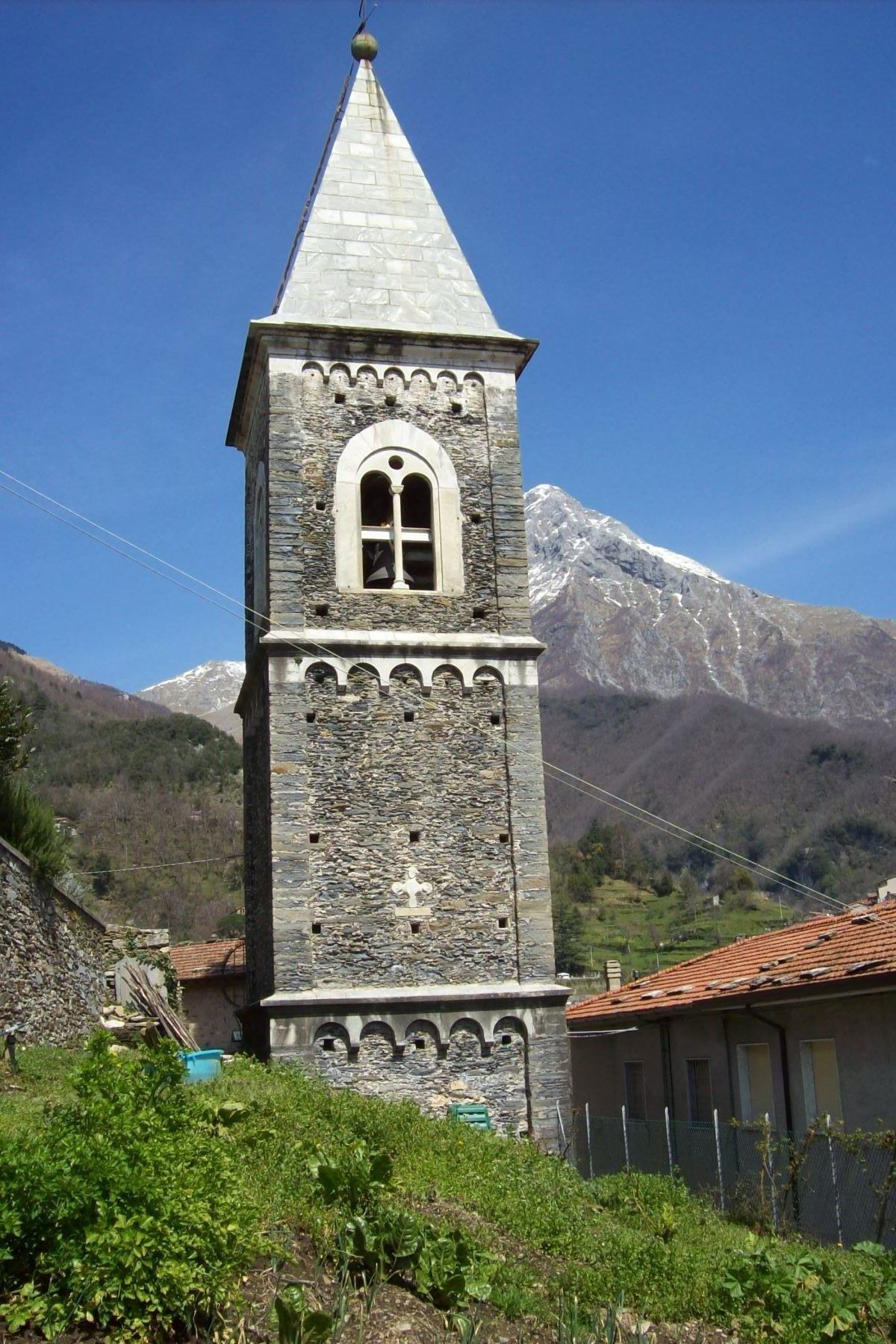
Bell tower of the Volegno church

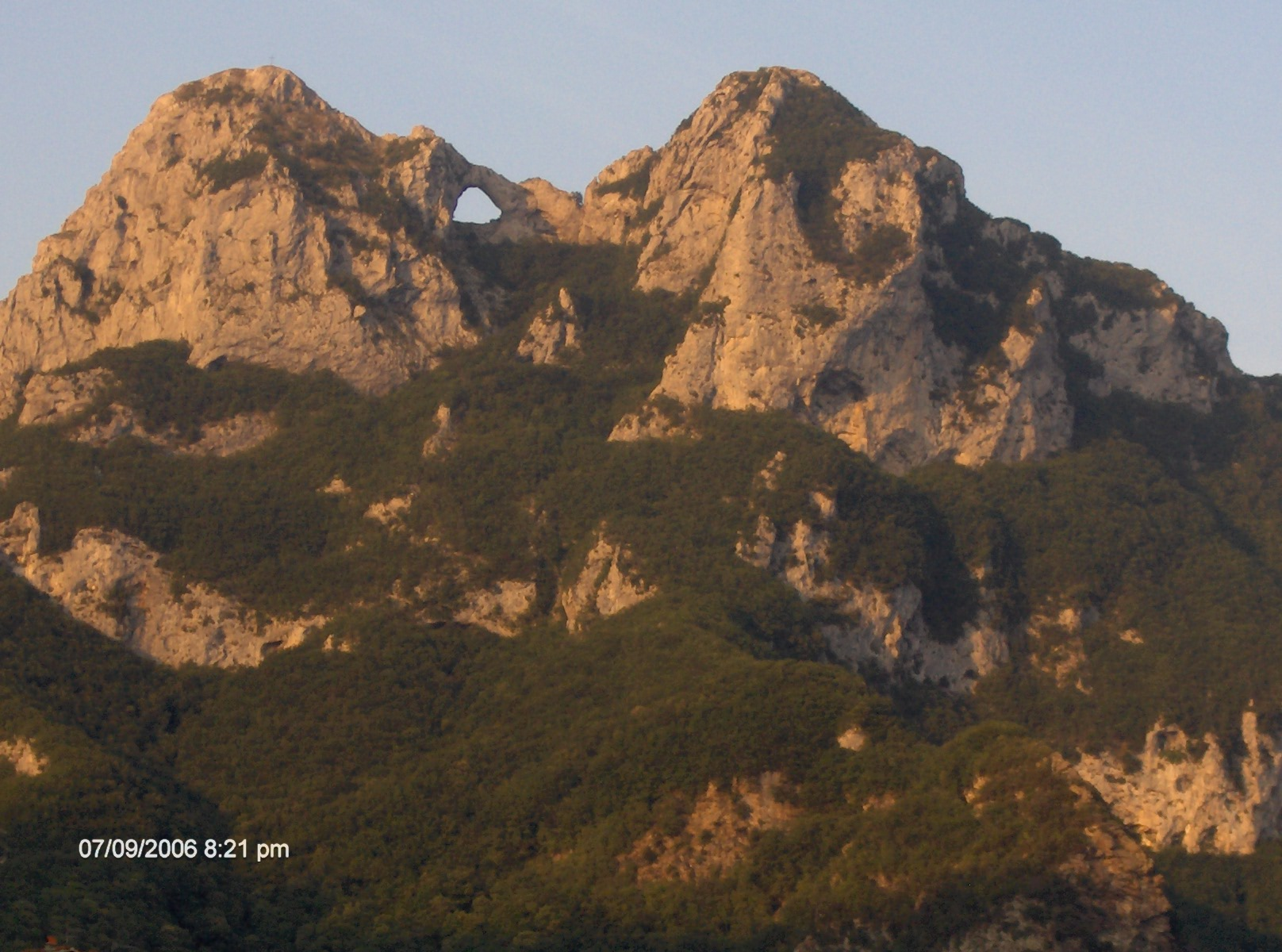
View of Monte Forato

== See also ==
- Retignano
- Sant'Anna di Stazzema
- Montalto (Apuan Alps)
