= Angelo Ardinghi =

Italian engraver

Angelo Ardinghi (1850–1897) was an Italian wood engraver.

He was born in Forte de' Marmi near Pietrasanta in the province of Lucca. He first trained in Siena with Giulio Tadini, then in 1863, moved to the Istituto di Belle Arti, working under the engraver P. Giusti. At Siena, he won a number of competitions there. He obtained a stipend from the province of Lucca, and moved to Bologna to work under professor Francesco Ratti, and from there to Milan, where he opened a studio for wood engraving. He became a professor of xylography (wood-cut engraving) at the Scuola professionale of Florence. He won awards in 1877 at the Provincial Exposition of Lucca. Among his works are:

- Portrait of Michelangelo for the l'Illustrazione Italiana
- Monument of the Commune and province of Lucca
- Portraits in the Dizionario Biografico degli scrittori viventi by Angelo De Gubernatis (1880)
- Illustrations to a Guida dell' Italia Centrale (1882).
