= Osvaldo Borsani =

Italian architect and furniture designer

- Born: 17 August 1911; Varedo
- Died: 1985 (aged 73–74); Milan
- Alma mater: Polytechnic University of Milan
- Occupation: Architect, furniture designer
- Website: www.osvaldoborsani.com

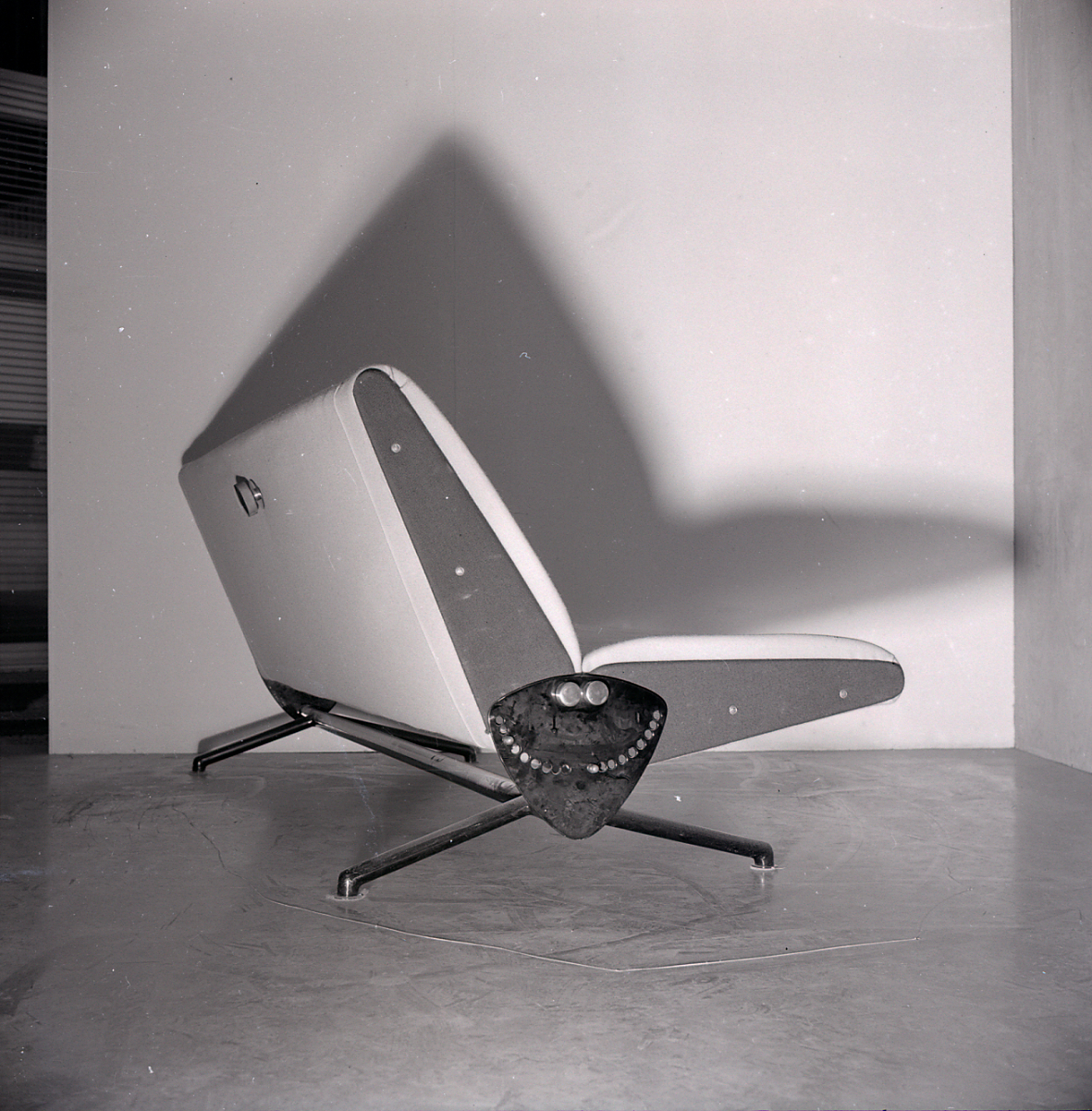
Escluse divano by Borsani (Paolo Monti photograph, 1954)

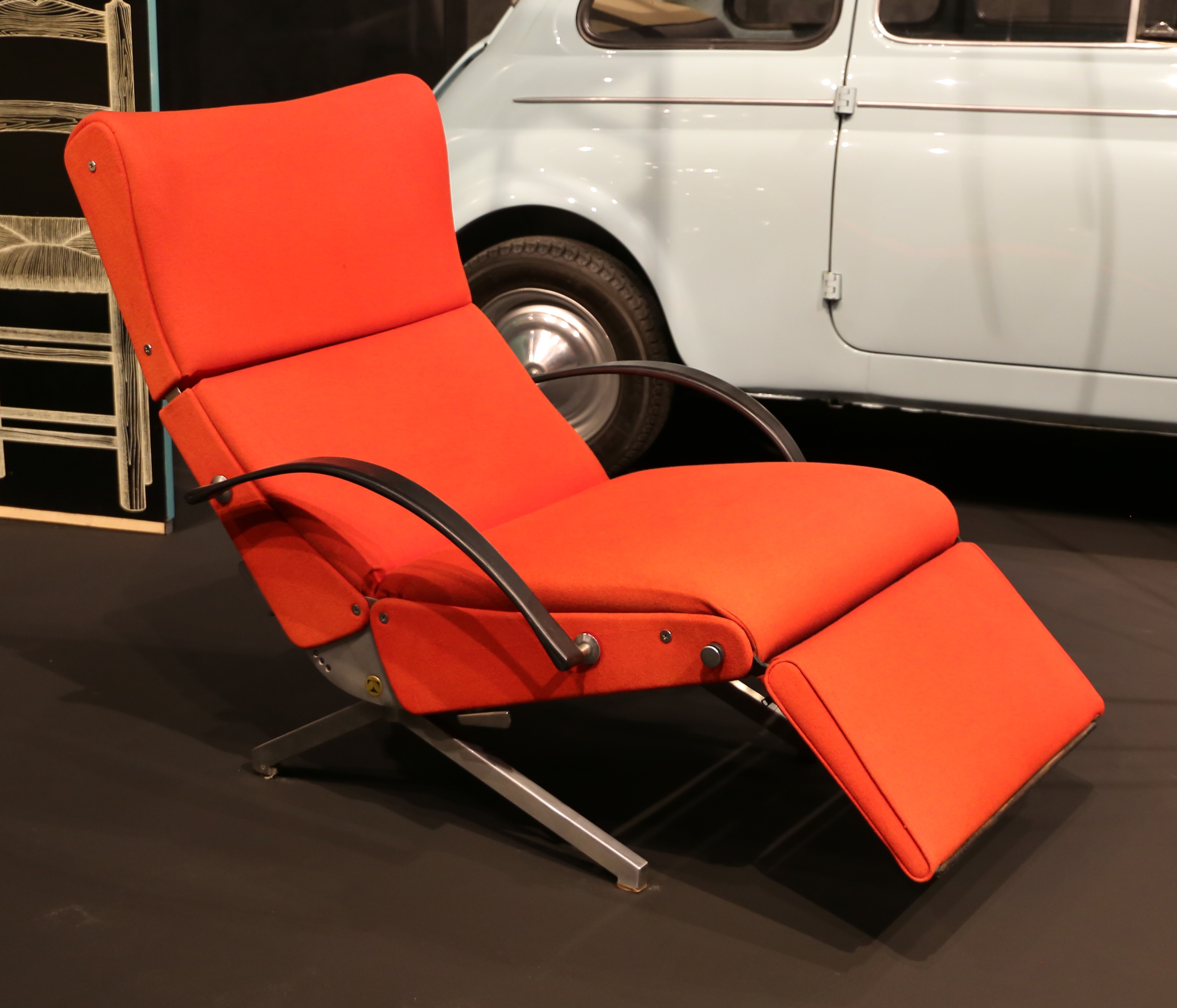
Tecno P40 chaise longue by Borsani (1955), Triennale Design Museum

Osvaldo Borsani (1911–1985) was an Italian architect and furniture designer.

Borsani and his twin brother Fulgenzio founded the Italian designer furniture company Tecno S.p.A. in 1953.

Works by Borsani are held by the Museum of Modern Art and the Brooklyn Museum in New York, San Francisco Museum of Modern Art, Victoria and Albert Museum in London, Centre Pompidou in Paris, Die Neue Sammlung in Munich, Museum Boijmans Van Beuningen in Rotterdam, Musée des arts décoratifs de Montréal, and the Triennale di Milano museum.
