= Forte dei Marmi =

- Comune
- Comune di Forte dei Marmi
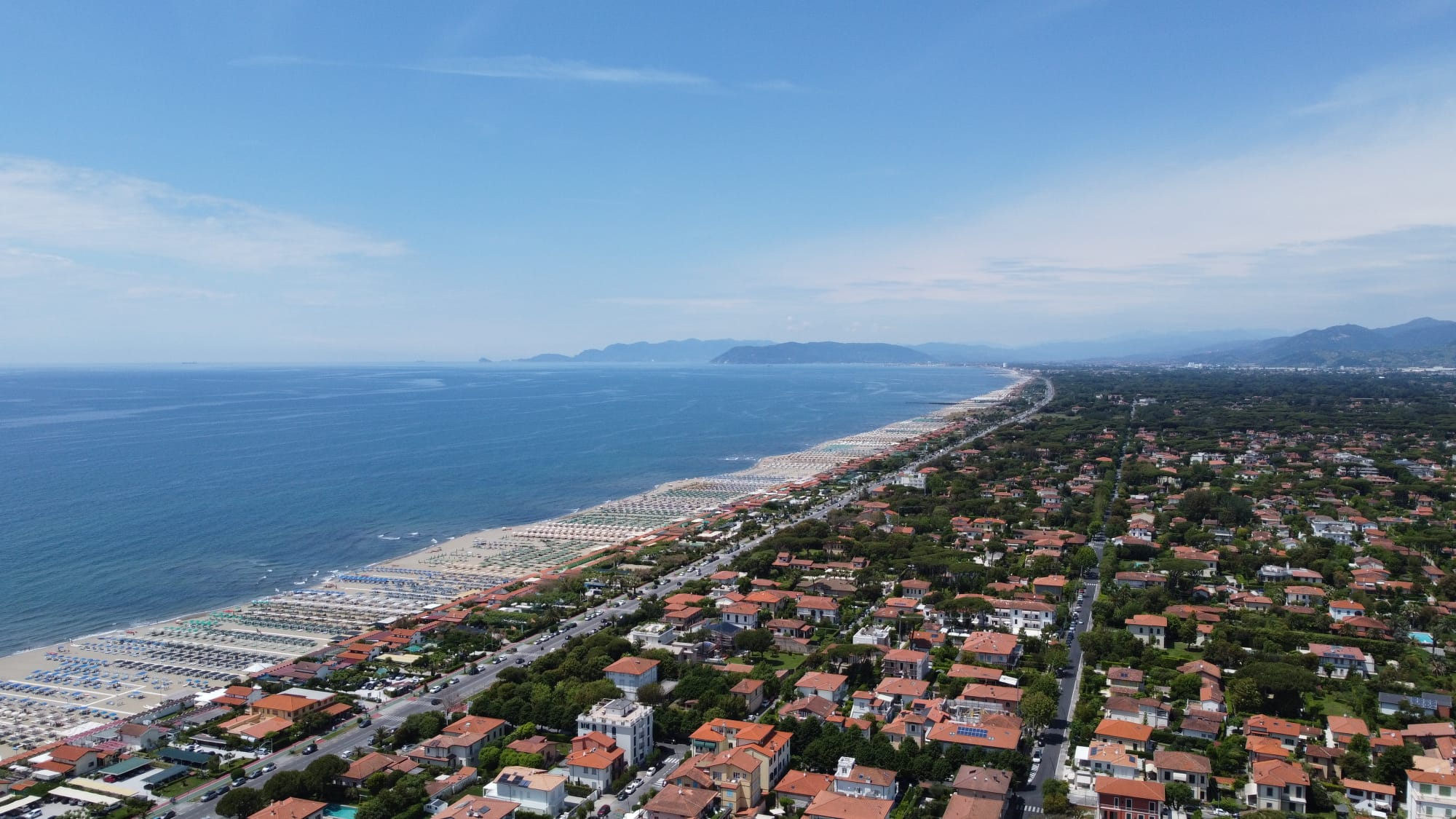

- Coat of arms

- Location within Italy Location within Tuscany
- Coordinates: 43°57′N 10°11′E
- Country: Italy
- Region: Tuscany
- Province: Lucca (LU)
- Frazioni: Caranna, Roma Imperiale, Vaiana, Vittoria Apuana

Government
  - Mayor: Bruno Murzi

Area
  - Total: 8.88 km^{2} (3.43 sq mi)
- Elevation: 2 m (6.6 ft)

Population (July 2025)
  - Total: 6,613
  - Density: 745/km^{2} (1,930/sq mi)
- Demonym: Fortemarmini
- Time zone: UTC+1 (CET)
  - Summer (DST): UTC+2 (CEST)
- Postal code: 55042
- Dialing code: 0584
- Patron saint: St. Hermes Martyr
- Saint day: August 28
- Website: Official website

Forte dei Marmi (Italian: [ˈfɔrte dei ˈmarmi]) is an Italian sea town and comune located in the province of Lucca, in northern Tuscany, overlooking the Ligurian Sea (formerly Tyrrhenian Sea).

Tourism is the principal activity of Forte dei Marmi's citizens. The population of the town, amounting to 6,613 nearly triples during the summer, because of the hundreds of tourists who mainly come from Florence, Milan, Germany, and Russia. Forte dei Marmi is one of the major destinations which continue to attract the Italian upper class.

The city contains a gate built in a former bog, a historical artifact that relates to strategic planning by the ancient Roman army.

== Toponymy ==
In Italian, Forte dei Marmi means "Fort of the marbles". The town takes its name from the fortress that rises in the middle of the main square, built under Grand Duke Peter Leopold, who was to become Leopold II, Holy Roman Emperor, in 1788. The fortress was built to defend the coast from outer attacks, but in the 19th and the beginning of the 20th century it became the place where the marble quarried from the Alpi Apuane (they are the same mountains of the famous marble of Carrara) was stocked before being sent to the pier for shipping.

== History ==
During their expansion within the Italian territory, the Romans settled in Versilia. The army managed to overcome the people of Liguria in the 2nd century BC, under the skillful command of the proconsuls Publius Cornelius Cethegus and Marcus Baebius Tamphilus. The whole territory was centuriated to create new settlements for the colonies coming from Luni and Lucca. The silver, lead, and iron mines were exploited and the area became a strong economic resource. Between Querceta (Seravezza) and the Vaiana area, where Forte dei Marmi is currently located, there was a road that represented one of the axes of the Roman land centuriation (This road was later called "Via delle mordure", and to this day it bears this name).

Vaiana is mentioned in a document from 794 AD that registers the sale of a piece of land then called "Vaiano", where it was later discovered that there were springs that contributed to the waterlogging of the nearby countrysides.

In 1515 the marble quarries of the Versilian municipalities were donated to the Medici family; consequently new quarries were opened and a new road was laid out to bring the marble blocks down to the sea, where a pier was built. In the mid-17th century, the Medici government decided to divert the flow of the river Versilia, to avoid the flooding of the town of Pietrasanta. A new course was laid so that the waters of the Versilia would overflow naturally in the swamps of Lake Porta. This meant that the territories of Querceta and Vaiana had to be cut out of the river's trajectory. At about 1,500 meters, the river Versilia's new path crossed a road proposed and planned by Michelangelo, so a wooden bridge was built (this bridge was called "Ponte delle Tavole": "bridge made out of wooden planks"). Throughout the years, other canals were built and the area was reclaimed. The road became more and more important for the marble transportation.

The first stable settlement on the coast was called Caranna; it was not far from the watersprings of Vaiana. Later on, other settlements were built in what now is the current Forte dei Marmi city centre. Initially, the area was called "Magazzino del Ferro" (The Iron deposit) or "Magazzino della Magona" or "Magazzino dei Marmi" (The Marble deposit) because of the only building on the seashore. The whole district was also known as "Marina"; the county road that went from Querceta to the sea is to this day known as "Provinciale di Marina" (Marina county road).

In 1788 the Grand Duke of Tuscany, Peter Leopold II, commissioned the construction of a fort, the Forte Lorense, to defend the marble shipments and promote the territory. It was similar to the forts of Marina di Castagneto and Marina di Bibbona on the Maremman seaside.

The fort was completed on 6 February 1788. It was a defense point against pirate raids and it was also used as a deposit for the marble that came from the Apuane mountains to be shipped out to sea. Thus, the area began to be known as Forte dei Marmi (The Fortress of Marble). In 1833 the Grand Ducal Government asked engineer Giovanni Franchi to reconstruct the Ponte delle Tavole (The bridge was destroyed in 1944, during the Nazi invasion of Italy. It was later rebuilt in bricks).

In the meantime, the town of Forte dei Marmi was considered part of the municipality of Pietrasanta at the Unification of Italy in 1861. The touristic development at the beginning of the 20th century led to the birth of a city committee that asked for the detachment from Pietrasanta and planned on joining the town of Serravezza or on affirming its own independence. With the political support of Giovanni Montauti from Lucca, sponsored by the counts Siemens-Schuckert who owned most of the territory, Forte dei Marmi declared its autonomy as a separate comune on 26 April 1914.

== Tourism ==
Tourism in Forte dei Marmi started at the end of the 18th century when the rich families of the inland went to the coast to breathe healthy air and to sandbathe. At the beginning of the 19th century, many wealthy families from Tuscany and the north of Italy started to choose this town for their summer holidays. Later on, also European families started to do so. Many notable people started to arrive in the area and the first villas were built in the pinewood near the sea. The first ones were Agnelli, Siemens, Giovanni Gentile, Thomas Mann, Renato Fucini, Italo Balbo, Curzio Malaparte, Enrico Pea, Aldous Huxley, Guglielmo Marconi, the writer Riccardo Bacchelli, the sculptor Henry Moore, Luchino Visconti, and many Italian noble families. Artists meeting every day talking about arts and culture created a group called Quarto Platano. The Grand Hotel Imperiale in Forte became an important place for the European high society and the hotel was chosen also by the Belgian royal family. Tourism increased after the Second World War, especially in the nineteen sixties when more and more families loved spending their summer in this lovely paradisical locale. Many houses and hotels were built near the sea. In 1991 hotels were 101, most of them open only during the summer and some of them family-run businesses.

Today the area is still a destination for businessmen, managers, politicians, show-men, movie stars, and sport figures. It is still a town immersed in the pinewood with a sandy beach. The number of hotels decreased from 101 in 1991 to 58 hotels today. However, the number of people that have bought vacation houses here has increased. Many of the area's hotels have been renovated and are now apartments, private villas or three and four star hotels. Today, the 58 hotels have a total of 1.965 rooms. In 2010 in Forte dei Marmi 109.379 tourists spend an average of 3.9 nights for a total of 428.352 visits. The total visits were 423.250 in 2009 and 450.800 in 2008. In 2010, 49% were foreign tourists, in 2009 45% and in 2008 46%. The majority of Italian tourists come from Tuscany, then Lombardia, Piemonte, Emilia Romagna, and Lazio. The foreign tourists came from Germany, Russia, Great Britain, the Netherlands, France, Switzerland, and the USA (ISTAT data).

== Main sights ==
The Fortino (Fortress), also known as the Lorenese Fort, was built at the end of the 16th century by Leopold I, Grand Duke of Tuscany, to protect the city area due to increased trade and the growing marble industry. The construction was overseen by Giulio Barbolani from 1785 onwards. The building is now used as an exhibition and event space.

== Sports ==
Forte dei Marmi's field hockey team is in the Italian A-league.

== Notable people ==
- Rock singer Zucchero spent most of his childhood here.
- Italian tenor Andrea Bocelli and his wife Veronica Berti live here, as do Bocelli's children, who were all born here, and his ex-wife, Enrica Cenzatti.
- Tennis players Adriano Panatta and Paolo Bertolucci.
- The Agnelli family spent their summers in Forte dei Marmi at the luxurious Villa Agnelli (Hotel Augustus Lido). Virginia, mother of Gianni Agnelli and widow of Edoardo Agnelli, died in a car crash while driving to Forte dei Marmi from Rome.
- British writer Aldous Huxley lived in Forte dei Marmi for part of the 1920s.
- British sculptor and draftsman Henry Moore had a studio in Forte dei Marmi and took up residence at the Hotel 1908 Forte dei Marmi (formerly known as Hotel Ritz Forte Dei Marmi).
- German writer Thomas Mann holidayed in Forte dei Marmi where his daughter, Elisabeth Mann Borgese, owned a villa.
- Queen Paola of Belgium was born in Forte dei Marmi in 1937.
- The Italian fashion designer Giorgio Armani had a villa in Forte dei Marmi.
- Italian wood engraver Angelo Ardinghi, born 1850 in Forte dei Marmi.
- Italian writer Carlo Mazzoni grew up in Forte dei Marmi.
- Italian dance music producer Roberto Zanetti lives in Forte dei Marmi.
- Italian football referee Pierluigi Collina lives in Forte dei Marmi.

== Sister cities ==
- Etterbeek, Belgium

== See also ==
- Tourism in Italy
