= Seravezza =

- Comune
- Comune di Seravezza
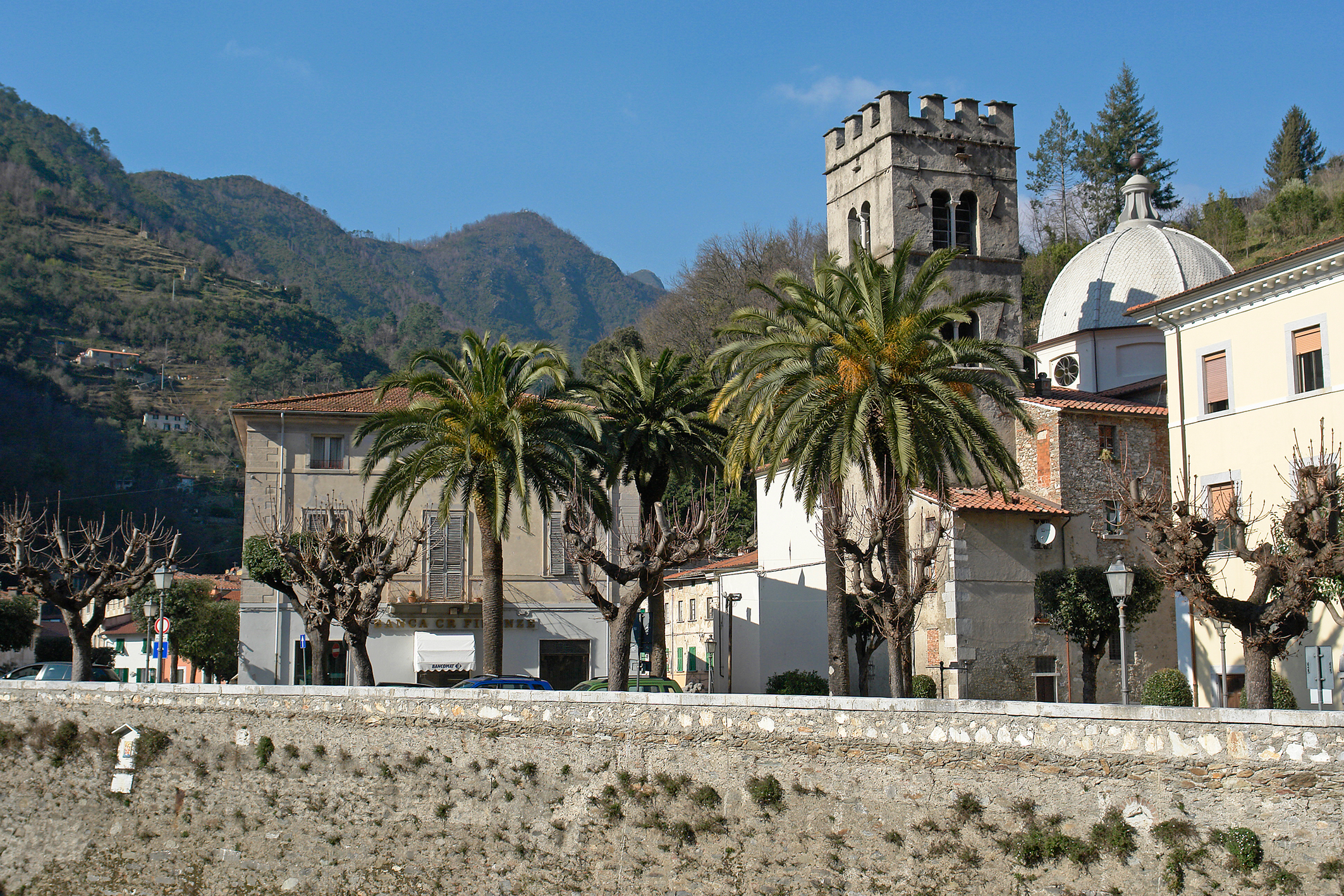

- Coat of arms

- Location within Italy Location within Tuscany
- Coordinates: 44°00′N 10°14′E
- Country: Italy
- Region: Tuscany
- Province: Lucca (LU)
- Frazioni: Azzano, Basati, Cerreta San Nicola, Cerreta Sant'Antonio, Corvaia, Fabbiano, Giustagnana, Federigi, Malbacco, Marzocchino, Minazzana, Pozzi, Querceta, Riomagno, Ripa, Ruosina

Government
  - Mayor: Riccardo Tarabella

Area
  - Total: 39.55 km^{2} (15.27 sq mi)
- Elevation: 50 m (160 ft)

Population (31 March 2017)
  - Total: 13,007
  - Density: 328.9/km^{2} (851.8/sq mi)
- Demonym: Seravezzini
- Time zone: UTC+1 (CET)
  - Summer (DST): UTC+2 (CEST)
- Postal code: 55046, 55047
- Dialing code: 0584
- Patron saint: see list
- Saint day: see list
- Website: Official website

Seravezza is a town and comune in the Province of Lucca, in northern Tuscany, Italy. It is located in Versilia, close to the Apuan Alps.

== Neighboring municipalities ==
- Forte dei Marmi
- Massa
- Montignoso
- Pietrasanta
- Stazzema

== Patron saints ==
Seravezza's patron saint is Saint Lawrence. His feast occurs annually on 10 August.

According to historian Lorenzo Marcuccetti the battle remembered by historian Titus Livius of 186 BC was fought between apuan Ligures and Romans in Ponte Stazzemese. The battle was fought on a hill named Colle Marcio (Marcio Hill) from the name of the defeated consul: Quintus Marcius.

The frazione of Querceta has Saint Joseph, celebrated on 19 March. The patron saint of the frazione of Pozzi is Saint Roch.

== Sister cities ==
Seravezza is twinned with:

- Calatorao, Spain

== Notable people ==
- Marco Balderi, conductor
- Renato Salvatori, actor
- Dino Bigongiari, professor of Columbia University
