= Stazzema =

- Comune
- Comune di Stazzema
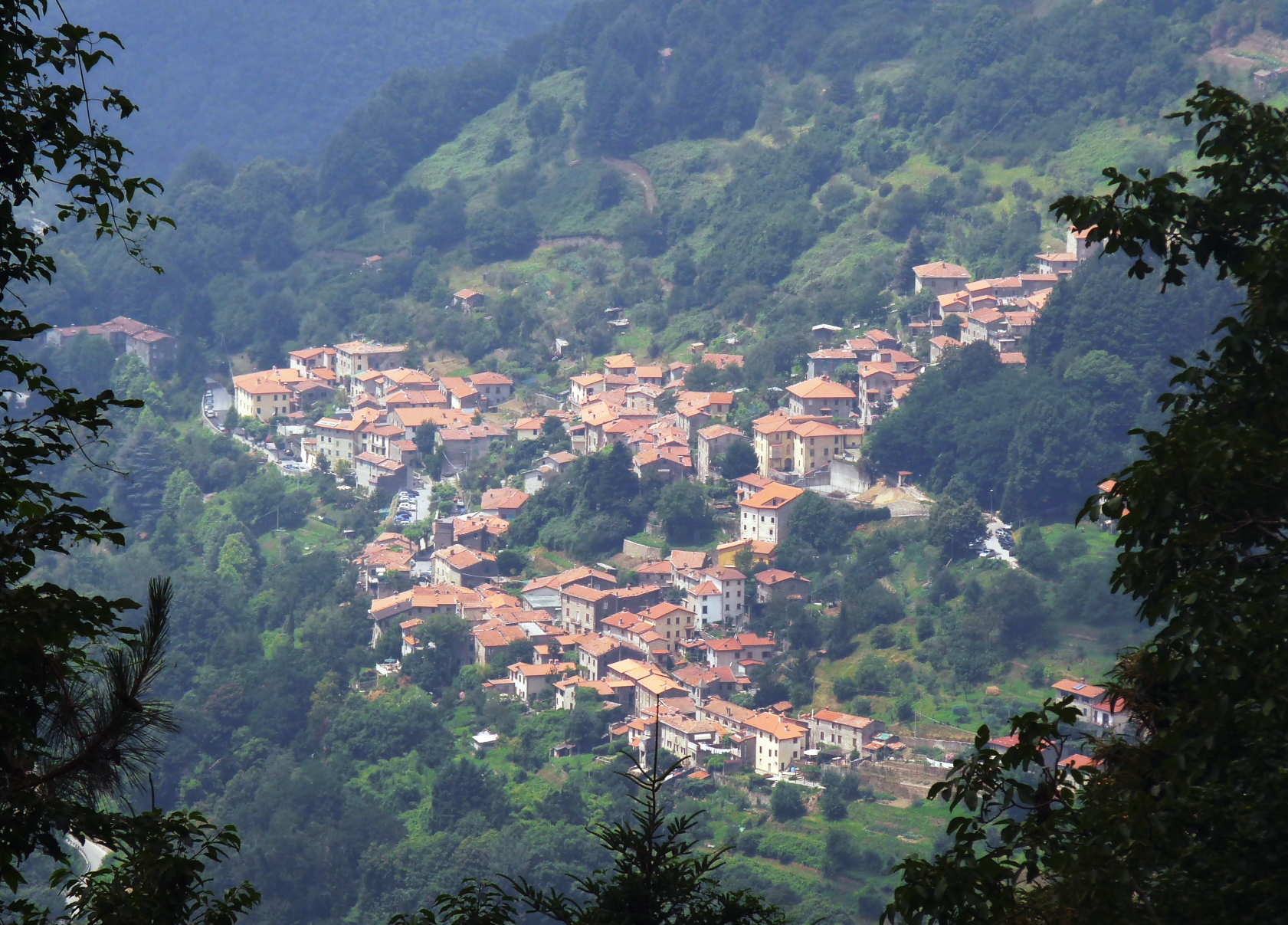
- Panorama of Stazzema

- Coat of arms

- Stazzema within the Province of Lucca

- Location within Italy Location within Tuscany
- Coordinates: 44°0′N 10°19′E
- Country: Italy
- Region: Tuscany
- Province: Lucca (LU)
- Frazioni: Arni, Cardoso, Farnocchia, Gallena, La Culla, Levigliani, Mulina, Palagnana, Pomezzana, Pontestazzemese, Pruno, Retignano, Ruosina, Sant'Anna, Stazzema, Terrinca, Volegno

Government
  - Mayor: Maurizio Verona

Area
  - Total: 82.08 km^{2} (31.69 sq mi)
- Elevation: 453 m (1,486 ft)

Population (1-1-2018)
  - Total: 3,083
  - Density: 37.56/km^{2} (97.28/sq mi)
- Demonym: Stazzemese(i)
- Time zone: UTC+1 (CET)
  - Summer (DST): UTC+2 (CEST)
- Postal code: 55040
- Dialing code: 0584
- Patron saint: St. Antony of Padua
- Saint day: 13 June
- Website: Official website

Stazzema is a comune (municipality) in the Province of Lucca in the Italian region Tuscany, located about 80 kilometres (50 miles) northwest of Florence and about 25 km (16 mi) northwest of Lucca.

== History ==
During World War II, the village of Sant'Anna di Stazzema was the site of a massacre of civil population by German SS soldiers and the Italian Black Brigades (12 August 1944). A total of 560 people were killed, among them 100 children, one of them only 20 days old. The city received the Gold Medal for Military Valour after the war.

== Geography ==
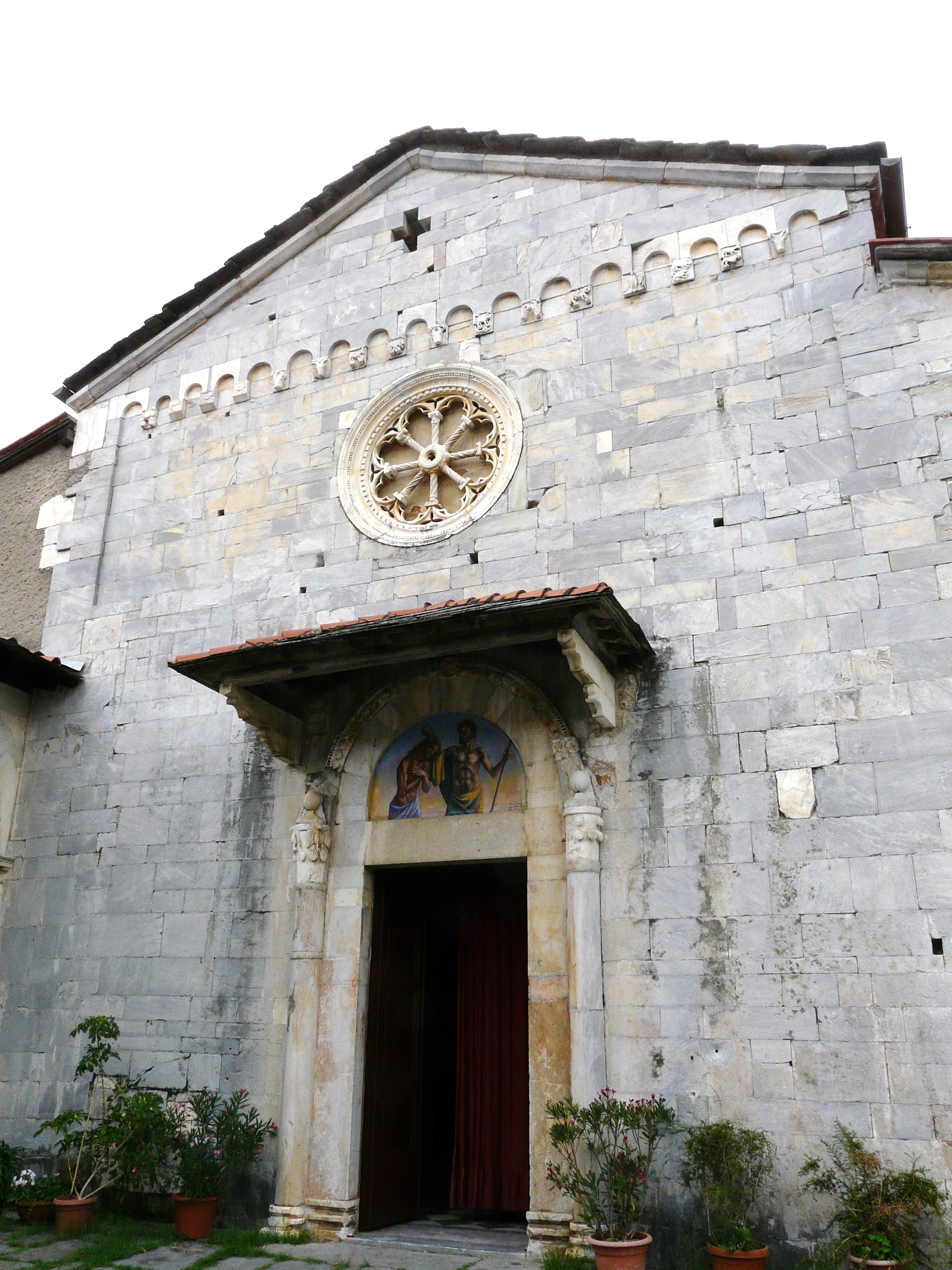
The church of the Assumption (Santa Maria Assunta)

Stazzema borders the following municipalities: Camaiore, Careggine, Massa, Molazzana, Pescaglia, Pietrasanta, Seravezza, Vagli Sotto, Vergemoli.

There are two churches of the Assumption and churches of St Anne, St Nicholas, St Peter, St Sixtus, and the Holy Trinity in Stazzema.

=== Frazioni ===
Stazzema is composed of 17 hamlets (frazioni):

Arni, Cardoso, Farnocchia, Gallena, La Culla, Levigliani, Mulina, Palagnana, Pomezzana, Pontestazzemese, Pruno, Retignano, Ruosina, Sant'Anna, Stazzema, Terrinca, and Volegno. Despite municipal name, the town hall is not located in Stazzema, but in the nearby hamlet of Pontestazzemese.
