= Versilia =

Part of Tuscany, Italy

Versilia is a part of Tuscany in the north-western province of Lucca and is named after the Versilia river. Known for fashionable Riviera resorts, it consists of numerous clubs that are frequented by local celebrities. It is composed of the four territories of Forte dei Marmi, Pietrasanta, Seravezza and Stazzema.

== Geography ==
The most famous and populated part of this area is Pietrasanta, which extends along the coastline and is at the foot of the Apuan Alps, travelling from South to North, beginning at Stazzema and up to Marina di Massa.

The coastal shelf is sandy sloping gradually into the Ligurian Sea, which stretches from the Ligurian coast up to the Piombino promontory, and not from the Tyrrhenian Sea as mistakenly believed, whose name has replaced the historic nomination, The Tuscan Sea.

== History ==
In Roman times the Versilia river was known as Fosse Papiriane and was a large swamp between Pisa and Massa, and between the sea and the Apuan Alps. It was touched by the Via Emilia Scauri and crossed by the Via Aurelia.

During the medieval era through the inside, along the South-East North-West, by Via Francigena.

A major literary figure who attended the Versilia at the beginning of the 20th century was Gabriele D'Annunzio, who had built a huge villa in the pine forest around Pietrasanta. The poet spent there the last years of his life, composing the most famous verses of Alcyone and Francesca da Rimini.

== Climate ==
The climate of the Versilia coast is mild, but all things considered, given the position close to the Apuan Alps, is greatly influenced by the humid Atlantic currents that contrast with the nearby mountain, bringing abundant rainfall, mostly concentrated in the half-seasons. During the summer, the humidity is very high, with values between 60 and 80%. This encourages the proliferation of mosquitoes, contrasted by the reclamation of marshes, which are finished by the beginning of the season.

== Sources ==
- Scalabrella, Diamondo (1964). Vita eroica di Guiscardo da Pietrasanta. Tip. Cooperativa Pietrasanta, p. 72.
- Lopes Pegna, Mario (1958). Versilia ignota. Florence: Editoriale Toscana.
