= Favali =

Favali is a surname. Notable people with the surname include:

- Federico Favali (born 1981), Italian composer
- Laura Favali (born 1970), French actress
- Tullio Favali (1946–1985), Italian priest

== See also ==
- Favalli
