= Martin of Tours =

Christian cleric and saint (316/336–397)

Saint Martin of Tours
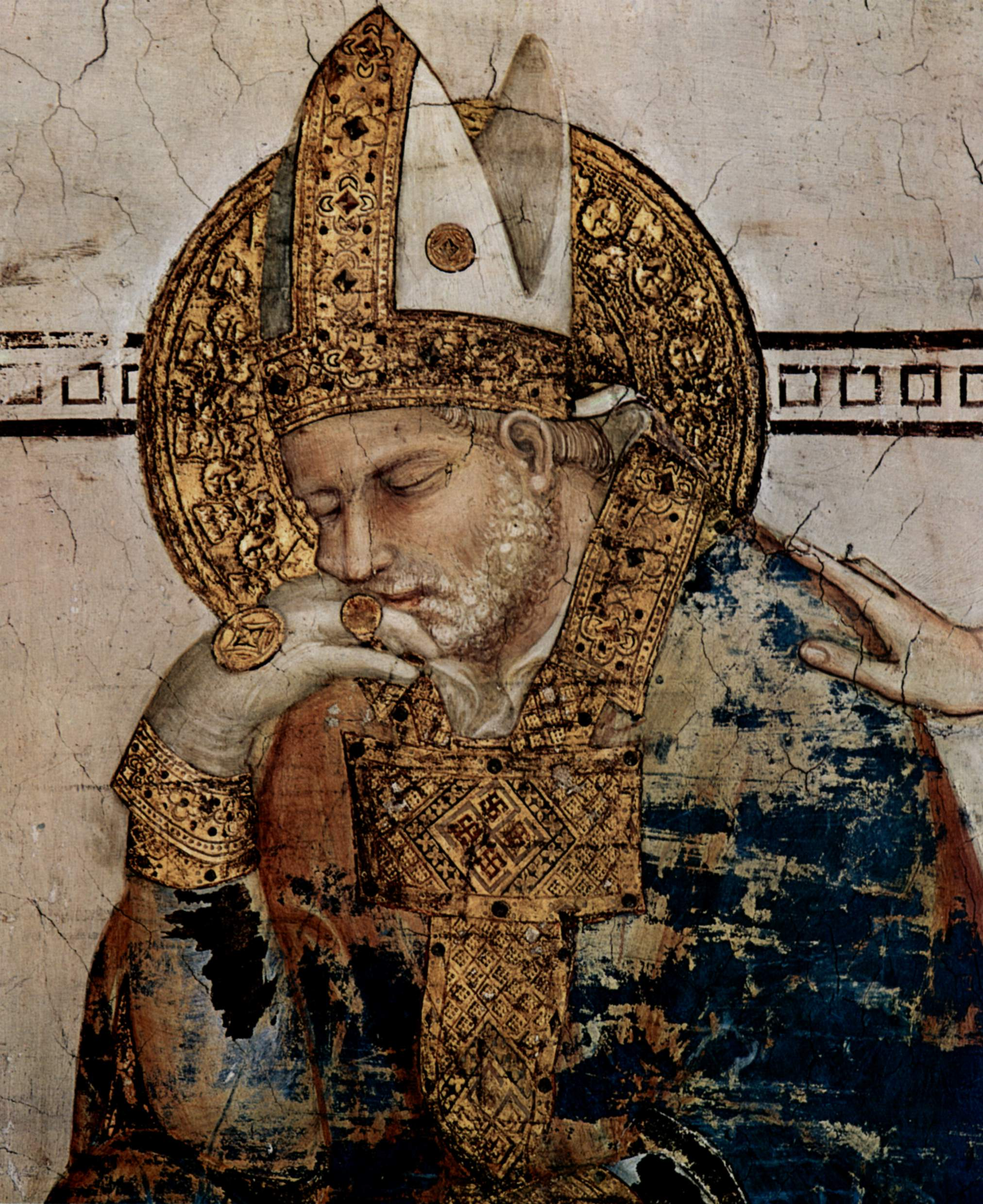

Bishop and Confessor
- Born: 316 or 336; Savaria, Diocese of Pannonia
- Died: 8 November 397; Candes, Gaul
- Venerated in: Catholic Church; Eastern Orthodox Church; Oriental Orthodoxy; Anglican Communion; Lutheranism
- Canonized: Pre-Congregation
- Feast: 11 November (Catholic Church, Lutheran Church, and Anglican Communion); 12 November (Eastern Orthodox Church)
- Attributes: Man on horseback sharing his cloak with a beggar; man cutting cloak in half; globe of fire; goose
- Patronage: Against poverty; against alcoholism; Baħrija, Malta; beggars; Beli Manastir; Archdiocese of Bratislava; Buenos Aires; Burgenland; cavalry; Church Lads' and Church Girls' Brigade; Dieburg; Edingen equestrians; Erfurt; Foiano della Chiana; France; geese; horses; hotel-keepers; innkeepers; Kortrijk; diocese of Mainz; Montemagno; Olpe; Ourense; Pietrasanta; Pontifical Swiss Guards; quartermasters; reformed alcoholics; riders; Taal, Batangas; Touraine; Bocaue, Bulacan; Diocese of Rottenburg-Stuttgart; soldiers; tailors; Utrecht; vintners; Virje; wine growers; wine makers; Wissmannsdorf and Villadoz; Torre di Mosto Sinogbuhan, San Joaquin, Iloilo

Martin of Tours (Latin: Martinus Turonensis; 316/336 – 8 November 397) was the third bishop of Tours. He is the patron saint of many communities and organizations across Europe, including of the former French Third Republic. A native of Savaria, Pannonia, he converted to Christianity at a young age. He served in the Roman cavalry in Gaul, but left military service prior to 361, when he became a disciple of Hilary of Poitiers, establishing the monastery at Ligugé. He was consecrated as Bishop of Caesarodunum (Tours) in 371. As bishop, he was active in the expansion of the Nicene Creed, yet he was against the violent persecution that fellow nicenes launched against the Priscillianists.

The contemporary hagiographer Sulpicius Severus wrote a Life of St. Martin. He is best known for the account of his using his sword to cut his cloak in two, to give half to a beggar clad only in rags in winter. His shrine in Tours became an often-frequented stop for pilgrims on the road to Santiago de Compostela in Spain.

== Hagiography ==
Sulpicius Severus, a contemporary Christian writer who knew Martin personally, wrote a hagiography of the early life of the saint. It contains descriptions of supernatural events, such as interactions with the devil and various miracles: Martin casts out demons, heals a paralytic, and raises the dead. Other miracles are: turning back the flames from a house while Martin was burning down the Roman temple it adjoined; deflecting the path of a felled sacred pine; the healing power of a letter written by Martin.

== Life ==
=== Soldier ===
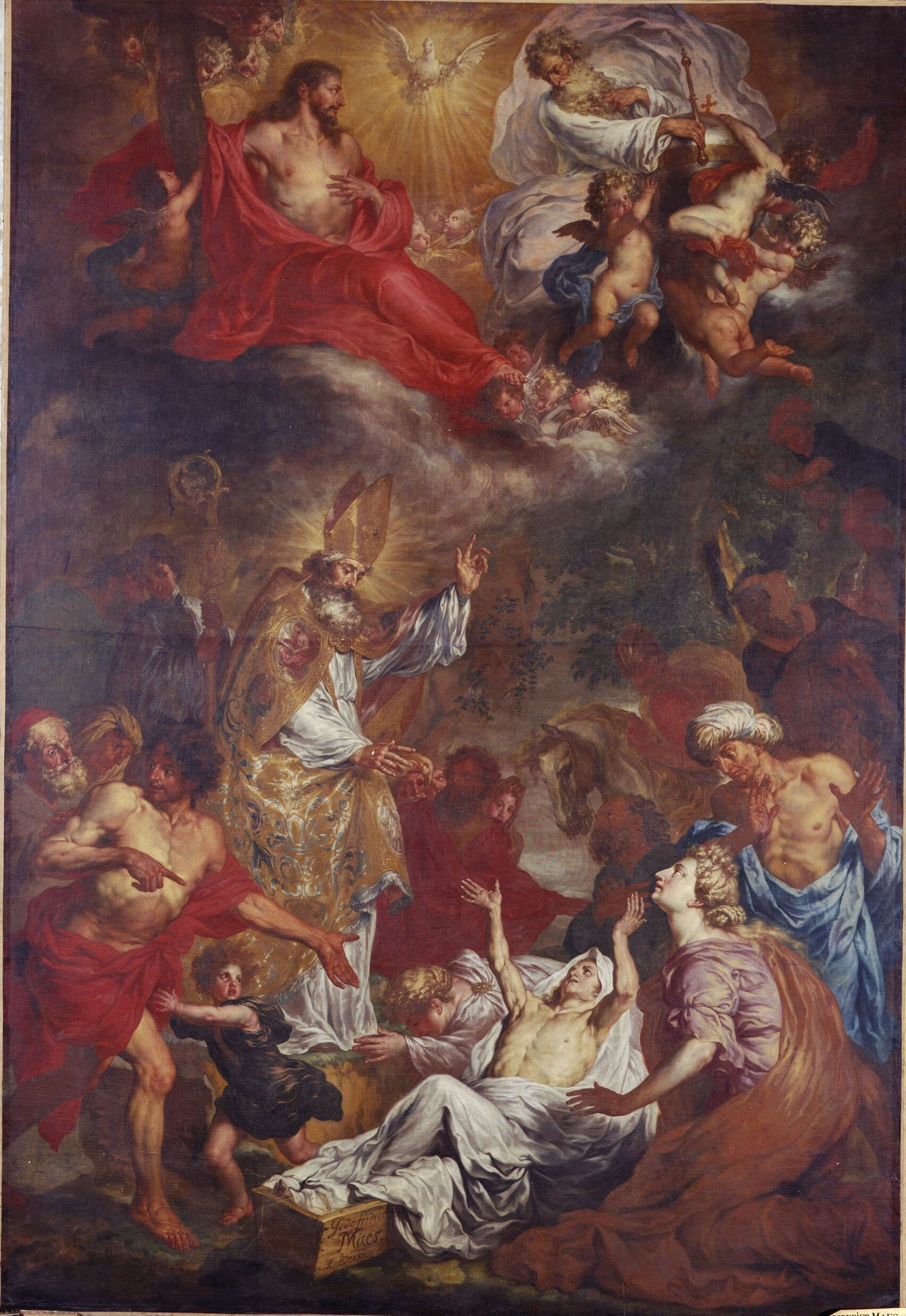
Saint Martin of Tours raises a man from the dead by Godfried Maes, 1687

Martin was born in AD 316 or 336 (Note: Both dates are recorded in hagiographical tradition. The birth date in 336 is preferred as the more likely by Stancliffe 1983, pp. 119–133) in Savaria, in the Diocese of Pannonia (now Szombathely, Hungary). His father was a senior officer (tribune) in the Roman military. His father was then allowed veteran status and was given land on which to retire at Ticinum (now Pavia), in northern Italy, where Martin grew up.

At the age of 10, he attended the Christian church against the wishes of his parents and became a catechumen. Two years later he decided he wishes to enter the life of a hermit and he would have followed up that desire with the necessary vows, had not his as yet too youthful age prevented. Christianity had been made a legal religion in the Roman Empire in 313. It had many more adherents in the Eastern Empire, whence it had sprung, and was concentrated in cities (the term "pagan" literally means "country-dweller"), brought along the trade routes by converted Jews and Greeks. Christianity was far from accepted among the higher echelons of society; among members of the army the worship of Mithras would have been stronger. Although the conversion of the Emperor Constantine and the subsequent programme of church-building gave a greater impetus to the spread of the religion, it was still a minority faith.

Because of a new edict issued by the ruling powers which required sons of veterans to be enrolled for military service, Martin at 15 was required to join a cavalry ala. His military service did not seem to alter his kind nature. While one servant was assigned to him, their roles were with his consent very much switched, and the real master (Martin) was generally acting the part of servant instead. At the age of 18 (around 334 or 354), he was stationed at Ambianensium civitas or Samarobriva in Gaul (now Amiens, France). It is likely that he joined the Equites catafractarii Ambianenses, a heavy cavalry unit listed in the Notitia Dignitatum. As the unit was stationed at Milan and is also recorded at Trier, it is likely to have been part of the elite cavalry bodyguard of the Emperor, which accompanied him on his travels around the Empire.

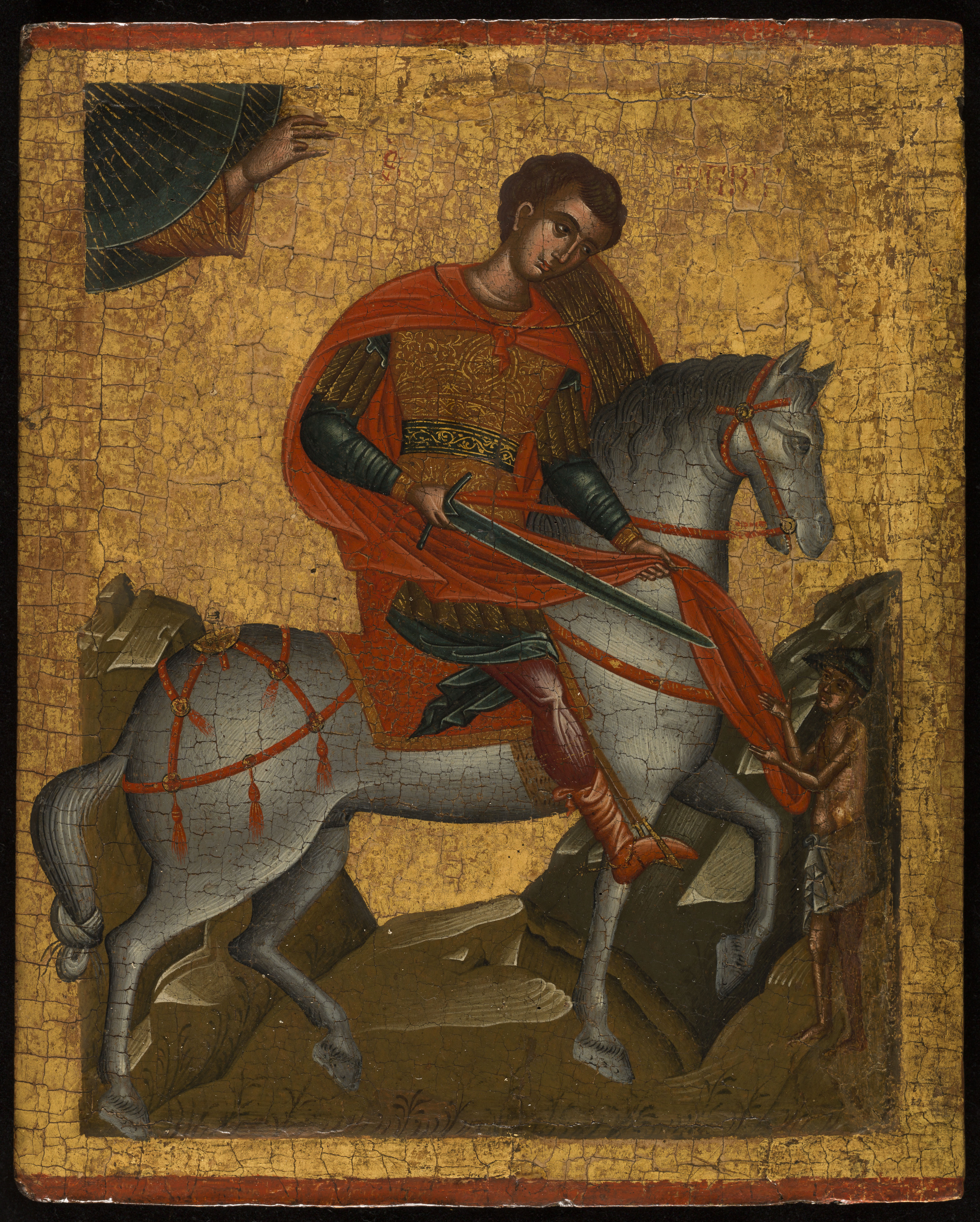
Cretan icon of Saint Martin

Martin's biographer, Sulpicius Severus, provided no dates in his chronology, so although he indicated that Martin served in the military "for nearly two years after his baptism", it is difficult for historians to pin down the exact date of Martin's exit from military service. Still, historian Andre Mertens has concluded that "he [Martin] served under the Roman emperor Constantine II (ruled 337–340) and afterwards under Julian (ruled 361–363)".

Regardless of the difficulties in chronology, Sulpicius reports that just before a battle in the Gallic provinces at Borbetomagus (now Worms, Germany), Martin came to conclusion that war was incompatible with the Christian life, so he resigned from the army and declined to receive the pension, telling, "I am the soldier of Christ: it is not lawful for me to fight." He was charged with cowardice and jailed, but in response to the charge, he volunteered to go unarmed to the front of the troops. His superiors planned to take him up on the offer, but before they could, the invaders sued for peace, the battle never occurred, and Martin was released from military service.

=== Monk and hermit ===
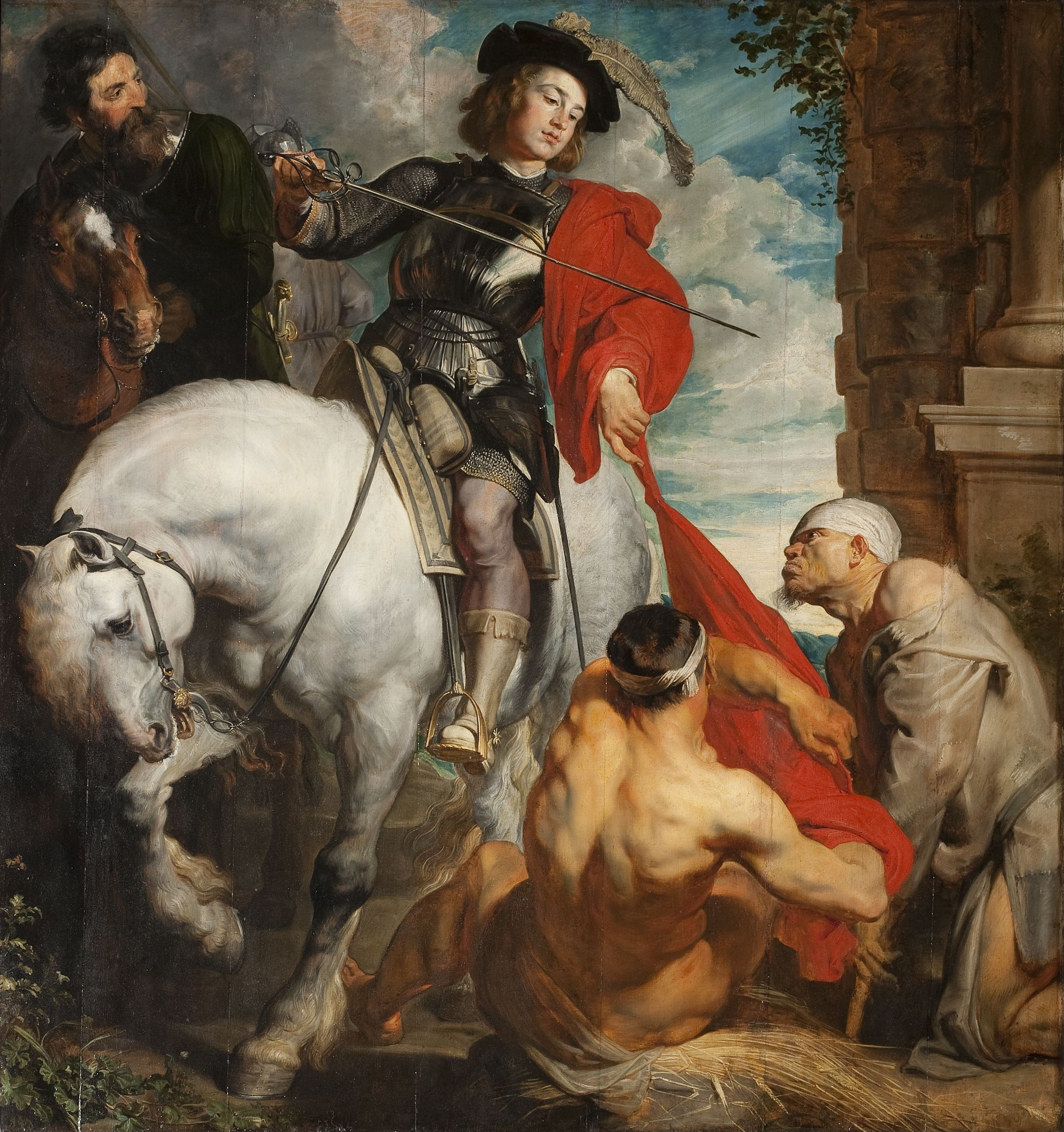
Saint Martin Dividing his Cloak by Anthony van Dyck, c. 1618

Martin declared his vocation, and made his way to the city of Caesarodunum (now Tours), where he became a disciple of Hilary of Poitiers' Christian orthodoxy. He opposed the Arianism of the Imperial Court. When Hilary was forced into exile from Pictavium (now Poitiers), Martin returned to Italy. According to Sulpicius, he converted an Alpine brigand on the way, and confronted the Devil himself. Having heard in a dream a summons to revisit his home, Martin crossed the Alps, and from Milan went over to Pannonia. There he converted his mother and some other persons; his father he could not win over. While in Illyricum he took sides against the Arians with so much zeal that he was publicly whipped and forced to leave. Returning from Illyria, he was confronted by Auxentius of Milan, the Arian Archbishop of Milan, who expelled him from the city. According to the early sources, Martin decided to seek shelter on the island then called Gallinaria, now Isola d'Albenga, in the Ligurian Sea, where he lived the solitary life of a hermit. Not entirely alone, since the chronicles indicate that he would have been in the company of a priest, a man of great virtues, and for a period with Hilary of Poitiers, on this island, where the wild hens lived. Martin lived on a diet of herbs and wild roots.

With the return of Hilary to his see in 361, Martin joined him and established a hermitage at what is now the town of Ligugé south of Poitiers, and soon attracted converts and followers. The crypt under the parish church (not the current Abbey Chapel) reveals traces of a Roman villa, probably part of the bath complex, which had been abandoned before Martin established himself there. The monastery became a centre for the evangelisation of the country districts around Poitiers, and later developed into Ligugé Abbey, belonging to the Order of St. Benedict and claiming to be the oldest monastery known in western Europe.

=== Bishop ===
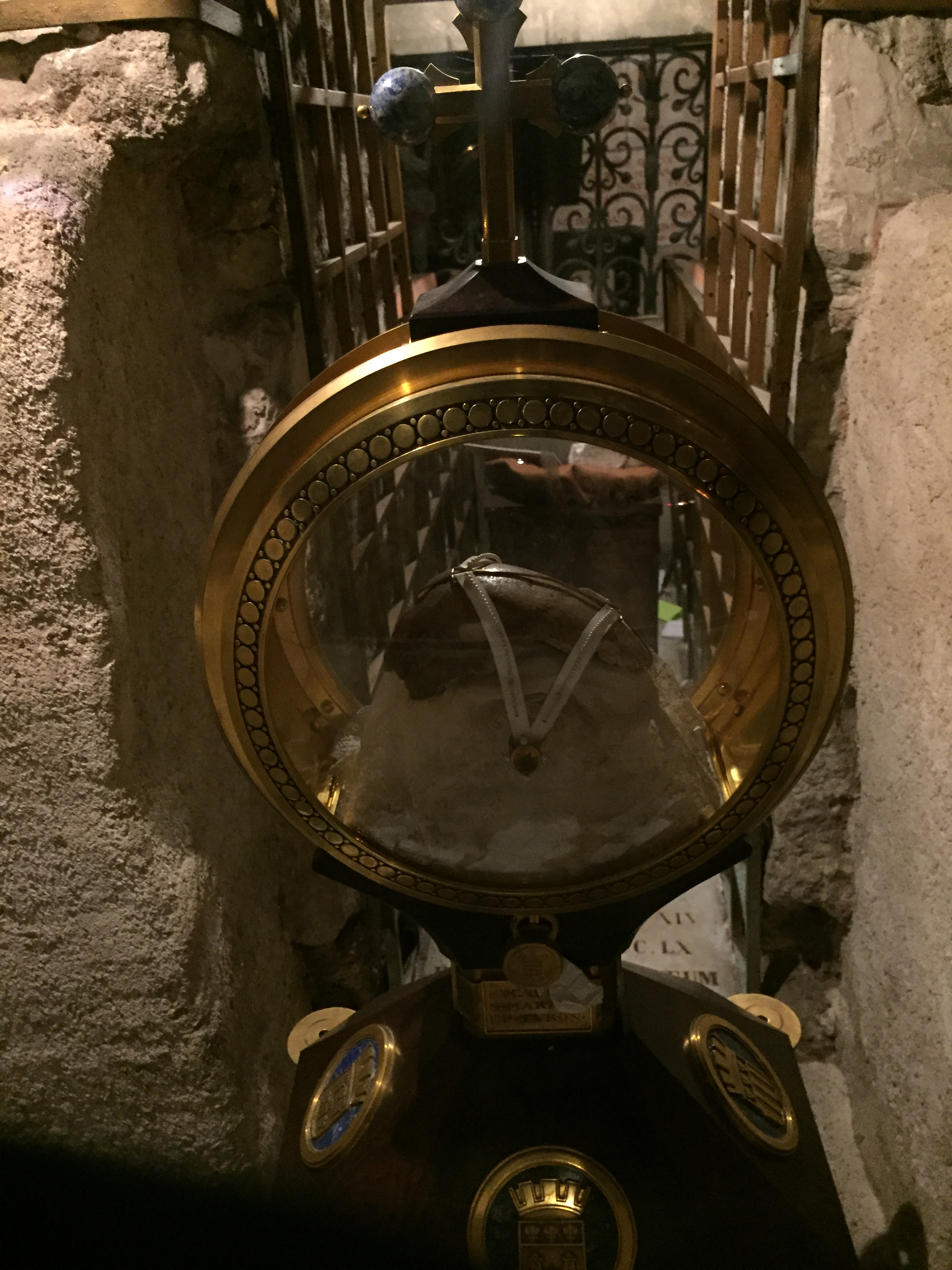
A part of St Martin's skull in the Basilica of Saint Martin, Tours

In 371, Martin succeeded Litorius as the third bishop of Tours. He impressed the city with his demeanour. He was enticed to Tours from Ligugé by a ruse – he was urged to come to minister to someone sick – and was brought to the church, where he reluctantly allowed himself to be consecrated bishop. According to one version, he was so unwilling to be made bishop that he hid in a barn full of geese, but their cackling at his intrusion gave him away to the crowd; that may account for complaints by a few that his appearance was too disheveled to be commensurate with a bishopric, but the critics were hugely outnumbered.

As bishop, Martin set to enthusiastically ordering the destruction of pagan temples, altars and sculptures:

[W]hen in a certain village he had demolished a very ancient temple, and had set about cutting down a pine-tree, which stood close to the temple, the chief priest of that place, and a crowd of other heathens began to oppose him; and these people, though, under the influence of the Lord, they had been quiet while the temple was being overthrown, could not patiently allow the tree to be cut down.

— Severus 1894, ch. xiii

Sulpicius writes that Martin withdrew from the city to live in Marmoutier (Majus Monasterium), a rural monastery which he founded a short distance upstream from Tours on the opposite shore of the river Loire. Martin introduced a rudimentary parish system in his diocese. Once a year, the bishop visited each of his parishes, traveling on foot, or by donkey or boat. He continued to set up monastic communities, and extended the influence of his episcopate from Touraine to such distant points as Chartres, Paris, Autun, and Vienne.

In one instance, the pagans agreed to fell their sacred pine tree, if Martin would stand directly in its path. He did so, and it miraculously missed him. Sulpicius, a classically educated aristocrat, related this anecdote with dramatic details, as a set piece. Sulpicius could not have failed to know the incident the Roman poet Horace recalls in several Odes of his own narrow escape from a falling tree.

=== On behalf of the Priscillianists ===
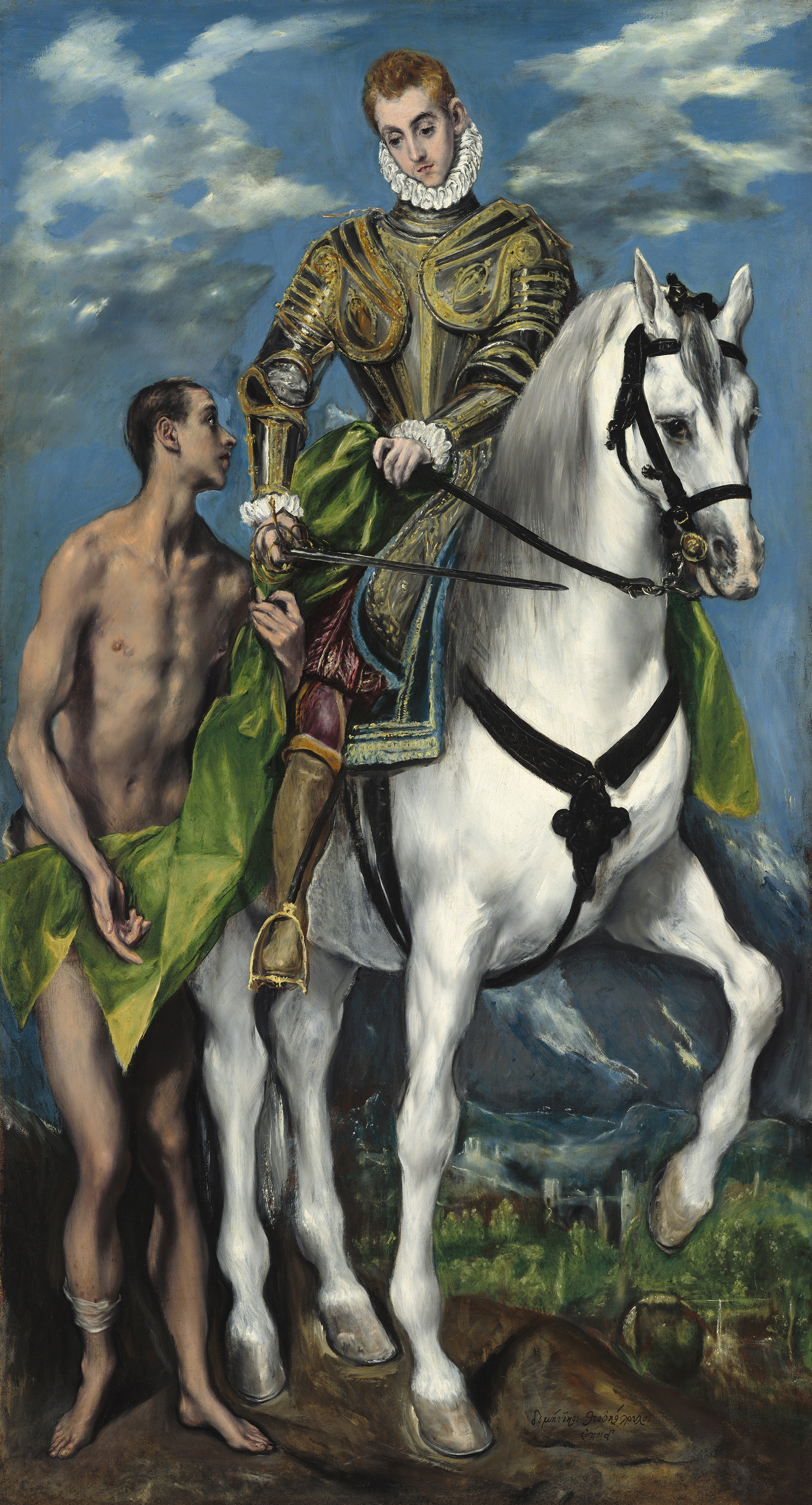
Saint Martin and the Beggar by El Greco, c. 1597-1599

The churches of other parts of Gaul and in Spain were being disturbed by the Priscillianists, an ascetic sect, named after its leader, Priscillian. The First Council of Saragossa had forbidden several of Priscillian's practices (albeit without mentioning Priscillian by name), but Priscillian was elected bishop of Ávila shortly thereafter. Ithacius of Ossonoba appealed to the emperor Gratian, who issued a rescript against Priscillian and his followers. After failing to obtain the support of Ambrose of Milan and Pope Damasus I, Priscillian appealed to Magnus Maximus, who had usurped the throne from Gratian.

Although greatly opposed to the Priscillianists, Martin traveled to the Imperial court of Trier to remove them from the secular jurisdiction of the emperor. With Ambrose, Martin rejected Bishop Ithacius's principle of putting heretics to death – as well as the intrusion of the emperor into such matters. He prevailed upon the emperor to spare the life of the heretic Priscillian. At first, Maximus acceded to his entreaty, but, when Martin had departed, yielded to Ithacius and ordered Priscillian and his followers to be beheaded (in 385). Martin then pleaded for a cessation of the persecution of Priscillian's followers in Spain. Deeply grieved, Martin refused to communicate with Ithacius until pressured by the Emperor.

=== Death ===
Martin died in Candes-Saint-Martin, Gaul (central France) in 397. After he died, local citizens of the Poitou region and residents of Tours quarreled over where Martin would be buried. One evening after dark, several residents of Tours carried Martin's body to a waiting boat on the river Loire, where teams of rowers ferried his body on the river to Tours, where a huge throng of people waited on the river banks to meet and pay their last respects to Martin's body. One chronicle states that "2,000 monks, and nearly as many white-robed virgins, walked in the procession" accompanying the body from the river to a small grove just west of the city, where Martin was buried and where his shrine was established.

=== Shrine basilica ===
The shrine chapel at Tours developed into one of the most prominent and influential establishments in medieval France. Charlemagne awarded the position of Abbot to his friend and adviser Alcuin. At this time the abbot could travel between Tours and the court at Trier in Germany and always stay overnight at one of his own properties. It was at Tours that Alcuin's scriptorium (a room in monasteries devoted to the copying of manuscripts by monastic scribes) developed Carolingian minuscule, the clear round hand that made manuscripts far more legible.

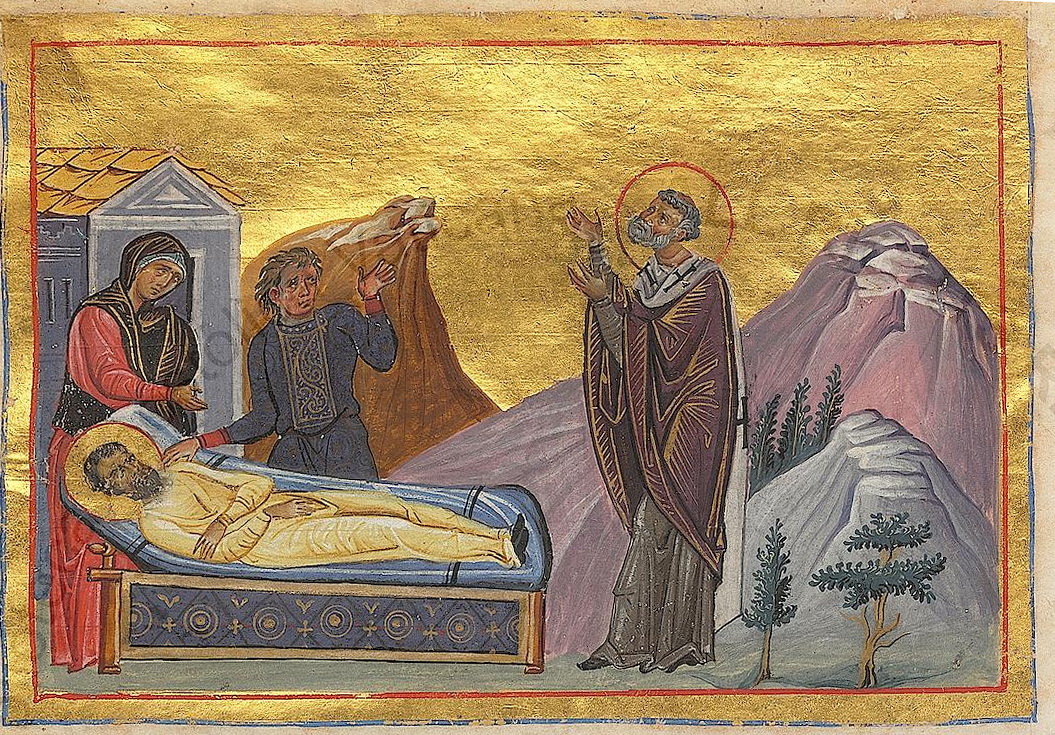
Miniature of Saint Martin from the Menologion of Basil II

In later times the abbey was destroyed by fire on several occasions and ransacked by Norman Vikings in 853 and in 903. It burned again in 994, and was rebuilt by Hervé de Buzançais, treasurer of Saint Martin, an effort that took 20 years to complete. Expanded to accommodate the crowds of pilgrims and to attract them, the shrine of St. Martin of Tours became an often-frequented stop on pilgrimages. In 1453 the remains of Saint Martin were transferred to a magnificent new reliquary donated by Charles VII of France and Agnès Sorel.

During the French Wars of Religion, the basilica was sacked by the Protestant Huguenots in 1562. It was disestablished during the French Revolution. It was deconsecrated, used as a stable, then utterly demolished. Its dressed stones were sold in 1802 after two streets were built across the site, to ensure the abbey would not be reconstructed.

== Legend of Saint Martin dividing his cloak ==
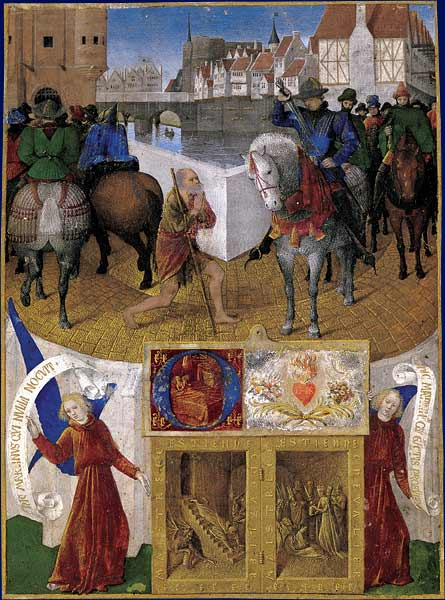
Saint Martin Dividing his Cloak by Jean Fouquet

While Martin was a soldier in the Roman army and stationed in Gaul (modern-day France), he experienced a vision, which became the most-repeated story about his life. One day as he was approaching the gates of the city of Amiens, he met a scantily clad beggar. He impulsively cut his military cloak in half to share with the man. That night, Martin dreamed of Jesus wearing the half of the cloak he had given away. He heard Jesus say to some of the angels, "Martin, who is still but a catechumen, clothed me with this robe." (Sulpicius, ch 2). In another version, when Martin woke, he found his cloak restored to wholeness. The dream confirmed Martin in his piety, and he was baptised at the age of 18.

The part kept by himself became the famous relic preserved in the oratory of the Merovingian kings of the Franks at the Marmoutier Abbey near Tours. During the Middle Ages, the supposed relic of St. Martin's miraculous cloak (cappa Sancti Martini) was carried by the king even into battle, and used as a holy relic upon which oaths were sworn. The cloak is first attested to in the royal treasury in 679 when it was conserved at the palatium of Luzarches, a royal villa that was later ceded to the monks of Saint-Denis by Charlemagne, in 798/99.

The priest who cared for the cloak in its reliquary was called a cappellanu, and ultimately all priests who served the military were called cappellani. The French translation is chapelains, from which the English word chaplain is derived.

A similar linguistic development took place for the term referring to the small temporary churches built for the relic. People called them a "capella", the word for a little cloak. Eventually, such small churches lost their association with the cloak, and all small churches began to be referred to as "chapels".

== Veneration ==
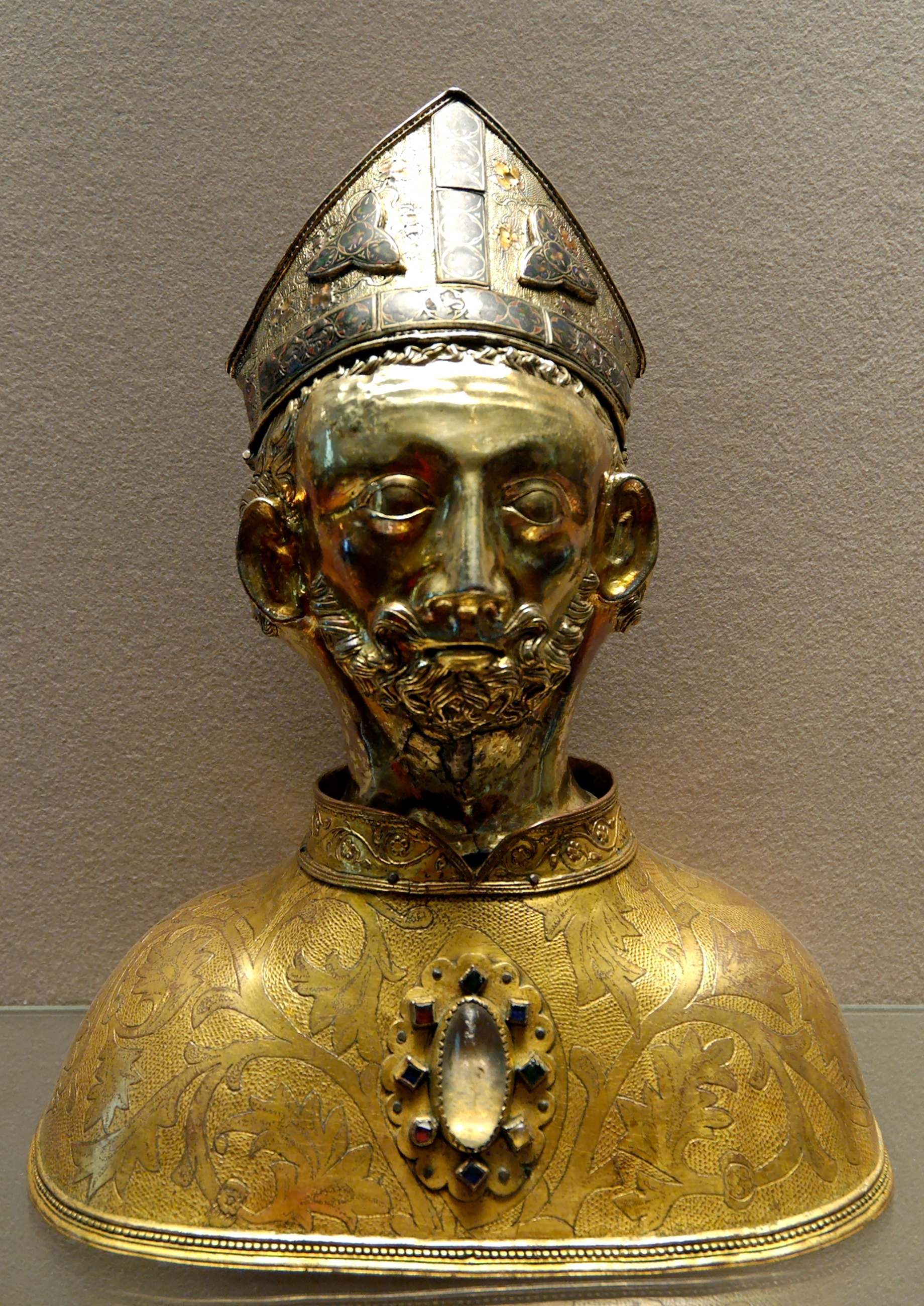
Reliquary for the head of St. Martin, silver and copper, part gilt, from the church at Soudeilles in central France, late 14th century, Louvre

The veneration of Martin was widely popular in the Middle Ages, above all in the region between the Loire and the Marne, where Le Roy Ladurie and Zysberg noted the densest accretion of place names commemorating Martin. Venantius Fortunatus had earlier declared, "Wherever Christ is known, Martin is honored."

When Bishop Perpetuus took office at Tours in 461, the little chapel over Martin's grave, built in the previous century by Martin's immediate successor, Bricius, (Note: "Hic aedificavit basilicam parvulam super corpus beati Martini, in qua et ipse sepultus est" (Gregory of Tours, Book X, Ch 31), quoted in Jacobsen 1997, p. 1108) was no longer sufficient for the crowd of pilgrims it was already drawing. Perpetuus built a larger basilica, 38 m (125 ft) long and 18 m (59 ft) wide, with 120 columns. Martin's body was taken from the simple chapel at his hermitage at Candes-St-Martin to Tours and his sarcophagus was reburied behind the high altar of the new basilica. A large block of marble above the tomb, the gift of bishop Euphronius of Autun (472–475), rendered it visible to the faithful gathered behind the high altar. Werner Jacobsen suggests it may also have been visible to pilgrims encamped in the atrium of the basilica. Contrary to the usual arrangement, the atrium was situated behind the church, close to the tomb in the apse, which may have been visible through a fenestrella in the apse wall.

St. Martin's popularity can be partially attributed to his adoption by successive royal houses of France. Clovis, King of the Salian Franks, one of many warring tribes in sixth-century France, promised his Christian wife Clotilda that he would be baptised if he was victorious over the Alemanni. He credited the intervention of St Martin with his success, and with several following triumphs, including the defeat of Alaric II. Devotion to St Martin continued to be closely identified with the Merovingian monarchy: in the early seventh century Dagobert I commissioned the goldsmith Saint Eligius to make a work in gold and gems for the tomb-shrine. (Note: Vita Eligii: "miro opificio exaure et gemmis contextuit sepulchrum"; quoted in Jacobsen 1997, p. 1109, note 11) The bishop Gregory of Tours wrote and distributed an influential Life of St. Martin. His popularity continued under the Merovingians' successors, the Carolingian dynasty.

Martin is honored in the Church of England and in the Episcopal Church on 11 November.

=== Revival of the popular devotion to St. Martin in the Third Republic ===
==== Excavations and rediscovery of the tomb ====
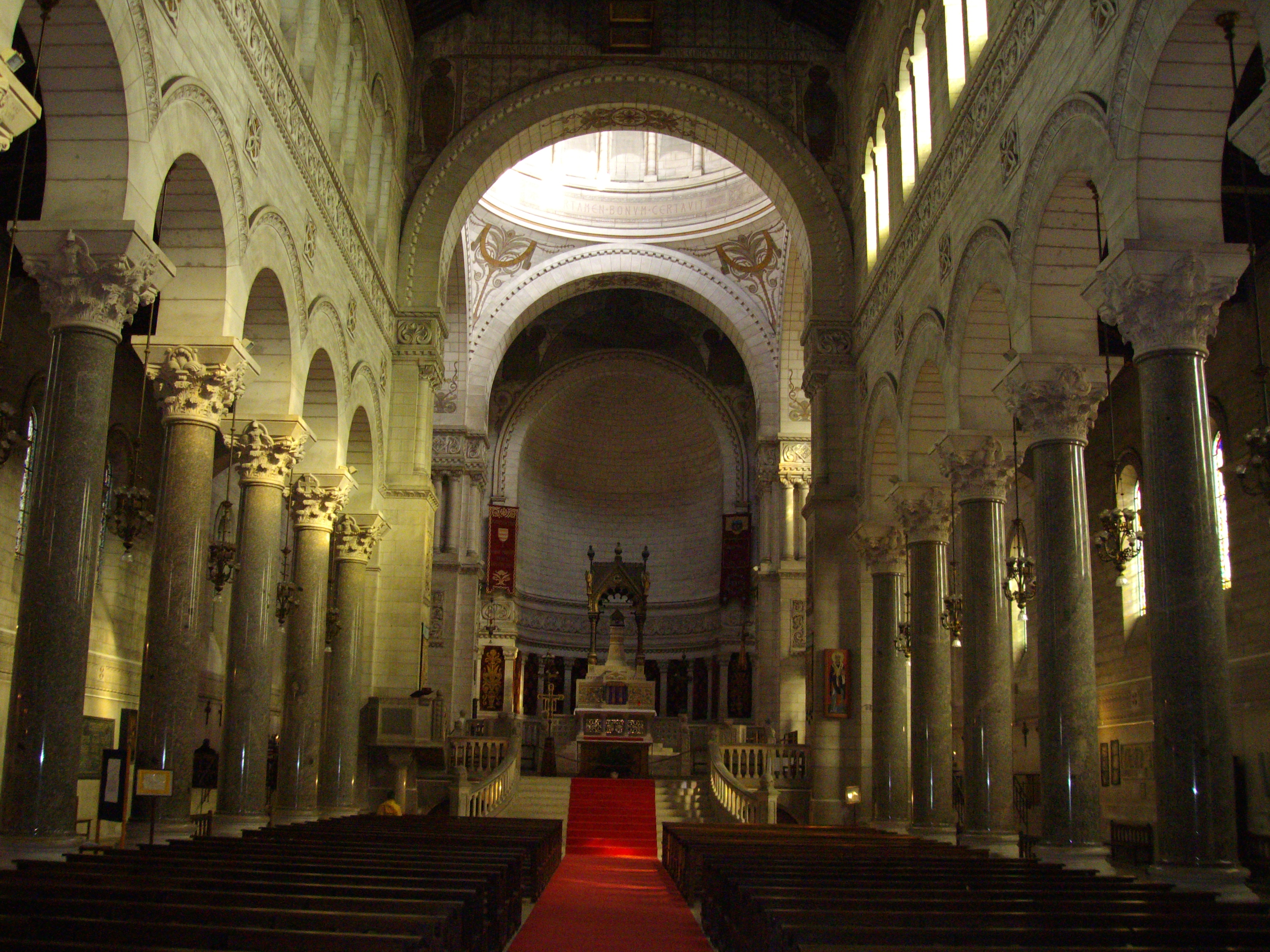
Basilica of St. Martin, Tours

In 1860 excavations by Leo Dupont (1797–1876) established the dimensions of the former abbey and recovered some fragments of architecture. The tomb of St. Martin was rediscovered on 14 December 1860, which aided in the nineteenth-century revival of the popular devotion to St. Martin.

After the radical Paris Commune of 1871, there was a resurgence of conservative Catholic piety. The architect Victor Laloux designed the Basilique Saint-Martin, erected on a portion of its former site. Started in 1886, the church was consecrated 4 July 1925.

==== Franco-Prussian War ====
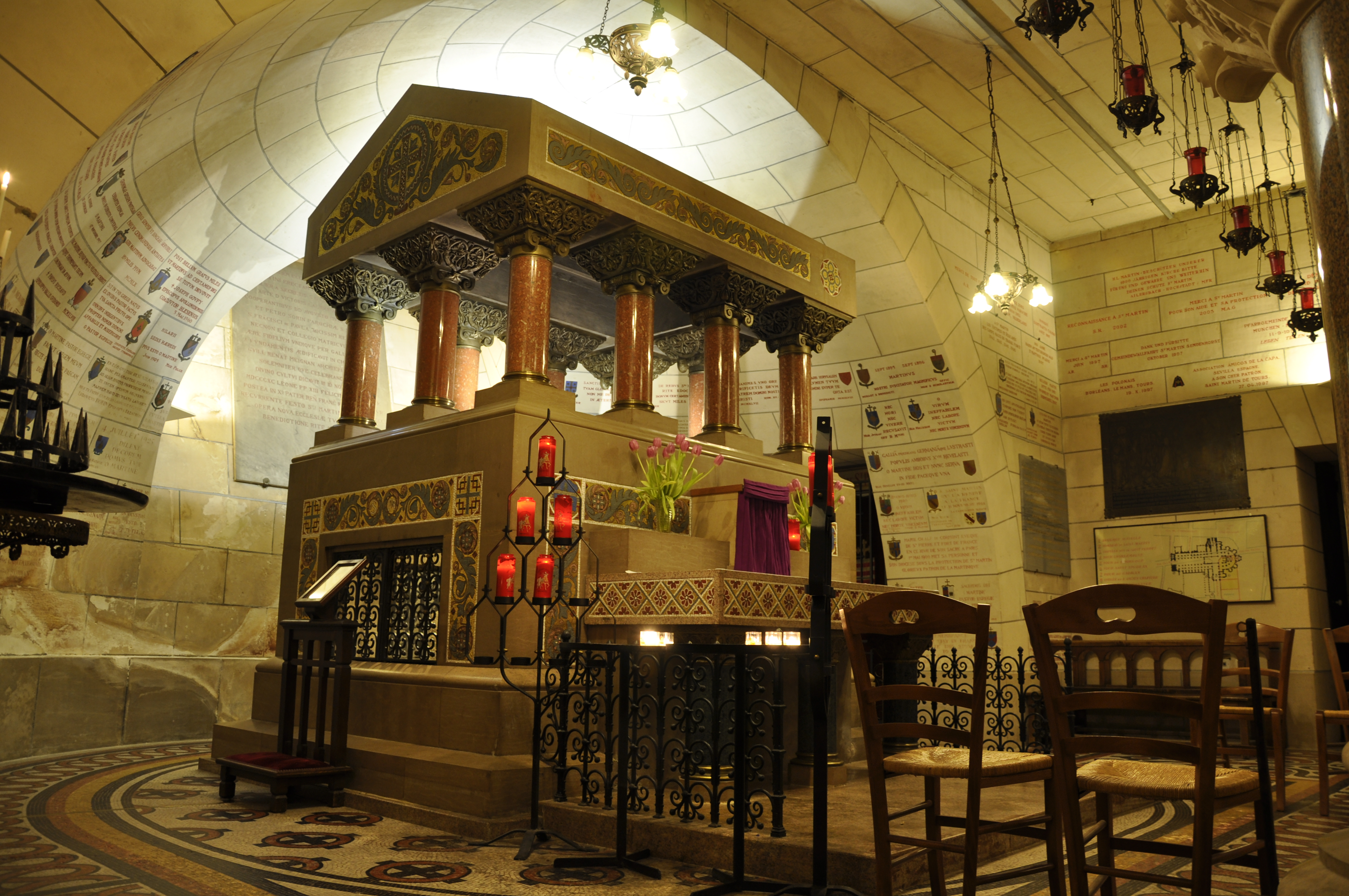
Tomb of Saint Martin

Martin's renewed popularity in France was related to his promotion as a military saint during the Franco-Prussian War of 1870–1871. In this era, Tours became the effective capital of France. During the French Third Republic, he was seen as a patron saint of France.

St Martin was promoted by the clerical right as the protector of the nation against the German threat. The ruined towers of the old royal basilica of St. Martin at Tours came to symbolize the decline of traditional Catholic France.

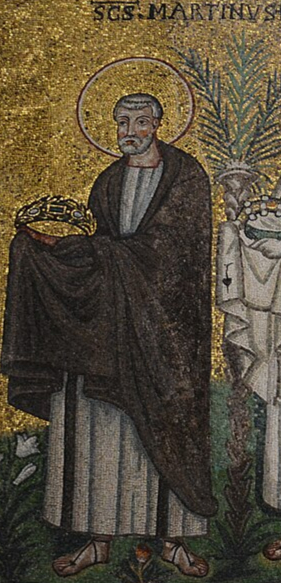
Mosaic from the Basilica of Sant'Apollinare Nuovo

With the government's relocation to Tours during the Franco-Prussian War, 1870, numerous pilgrims traveled to St. Martin's tomb. The banner read "Heart of Jesus Save France" and on the reverse side Carmelite nuns of Tours embroidered "Saint Martin Protect France". As the French army was victorious in Patay, some attributed it to Martin's intercession. Popular hymns of the 1870s developed the theme of national protection under the cover of Martin's cloak, the "first flag of France."

The Catholic right presented Martin as a masculine model of principled behavior, a brave fighter, a charitable man, and respectful of respected secular authority.

=== St. Martin as a French Republican patron ===
Archbishop René François Renou (Archbishop of Tours, 1896–1913) described the cloak of St. Martin as the "first flag of France," not the French tricolor. St. Martin's popularity was renewed during the First World War. Anticlericalism declined, and priests served in the French forces as chaplains; of the "more than twenty-three thousand parish priests and more than nine thousand members of religious orders" who took part in the war, "3,101 were killed." In 1916, Assumptionists organized a national pilgrimage to Tours that attracted people from all over France. The devotion to St. Martin was amplified in the dioceses of France, where special prayers were offered to the patron saint. When the armistice was signed on Saint Martin's Day, 11 November 1918, many French people saw it as a sign of his intercession in the affairs of France.

== Patronage ==
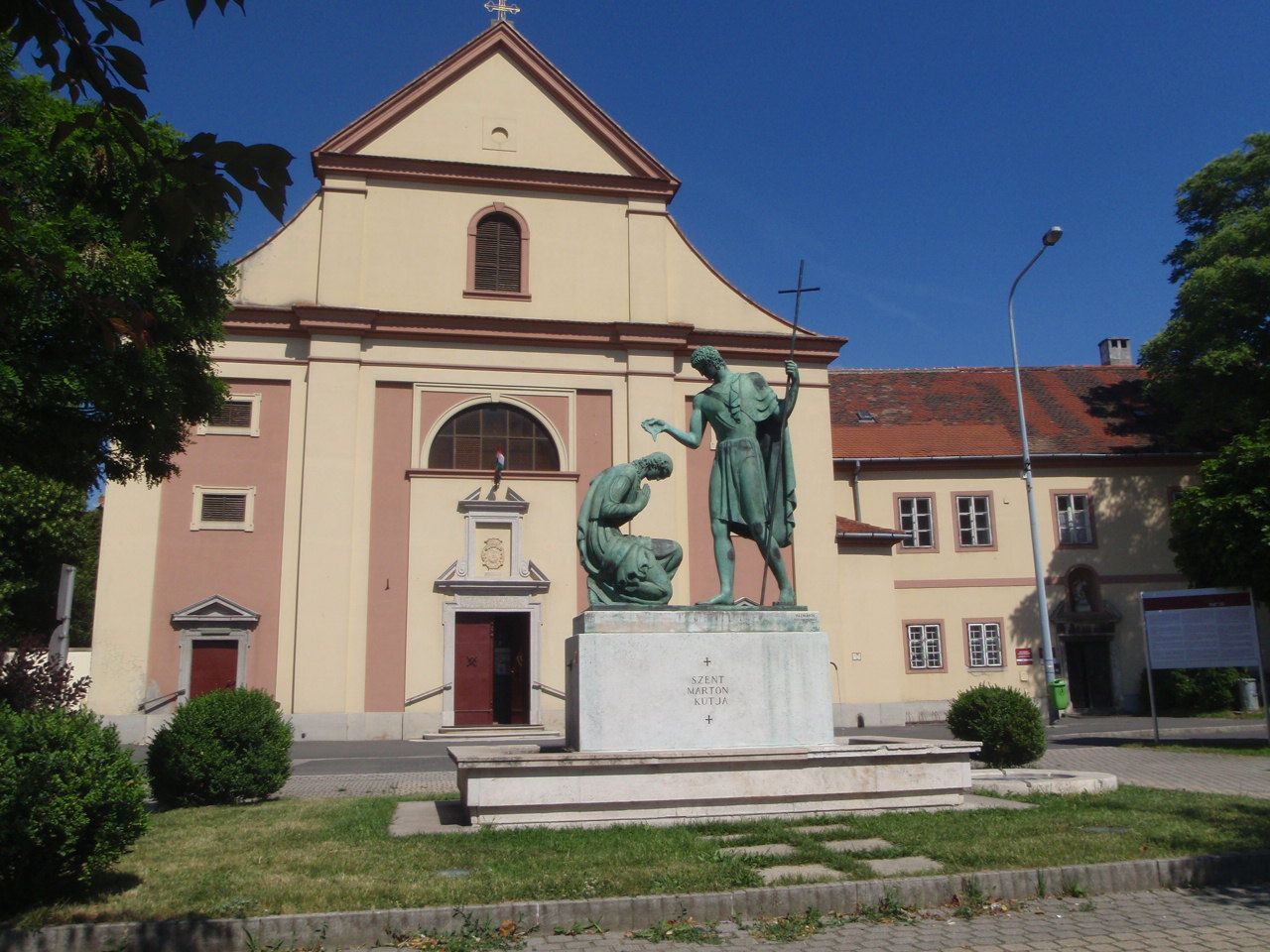
Martin of Tours' Fountain, behind the Visitors' Centre in Szombathely in Hungary, the birthplace of St Martin of Tours

Saint Martin is the patron saint of beggars, wool-weavers, tailors, the United States Army Quartermaster Corps, geese, vintners, and innkeepers, and France.

Beyond his patronage of the French Third Republic, Saint Martin more recently has also been described in terms of "a spiritual bridge across Europe", due to his "international" background, being a native of Pannonia who spent his adult life in Gaul.

In Poland, Saint Martin is the patron saint of the towns of Bydgoszcz and Opatów. His feast day is celebrated with a procession and festivities in the city of Poznań, where the main street (Święty Marcin) is named for him, along with a 13th-century church which is dedicated to him. As November 11 is also Polish Independence Day, it is a public holiday.

Saint Martin is the patron saint of the city of Szombathely, Hungary, which contains a church dedicated to him. He is the patron saint of Buenos Aires, Argentina. In the Netherlands, he is the patron of the cathedral and city of Utrecht. He is also the patron of the city of Groningen; its Martini tower and Martinikerk (Martin's Church) were named for him.

Saint Martin is also the patron of the church and town of Bocaue, in the Philippines.

Saint Martin is the patron saint of the United States Army Quartermaster Corps, which also awards a medal in his name, the Order of St. Martin.

Saint Martin is also patron saint of the Church Lads' and Church Girls' Brigade, an Anglican youth organisation; the youngest section of the brigade, comprising those aged 4 to 7, was renamed the "Martins" in his honour in 1998.

== Iconography ==
Saint Martin is most generally portrayed on horseback dividing his cloak with the beggar. His emblem in English art is often that of a goose, whose annual migration is about late autumn.

== Influence ==
Saint Martin as a heraldic symbol (the coat of arms of Senica, Slovakia)

By the early 9th century, respect for Saint Martin was well-established in Ireland. His monastery at Marmoûtiers became the training ground for many Celtic missions and missionaries. Some believe that St. Patrick was his nephew and that Patrick was one of many Celtic notables who lived for a time at Marmoûtiers. St. Ninian definitely studied at Marmoûtiers and was profoundly influenced by Martin, to whom he dedicated a new church. The Book of Armagh contains, among other texts, almost the complete body of writings on Saint Martin by Sulpicius Severus.

In Jonas of Bobbio's Vita Columbani, Jonas relates that Saint Columbanus, while travelling, requested to be allowed to pray at the tomb of St Martin. The Irish palimpsest sacramentary from the mid-7th century contains the text of a mass for St Martin. In the Life of Columba, Adamnan mentions in passing that St Martin was commemorated during Mass at Iona.

In his Ireland and Her Neighbours in the Seventh Century, Michael Richter attributes this to the mission of Palladius seen within the wider context of the mission of Germanus of Auxerre to Britain around 429. Thus, this could be the context in which the Life of St Martin was brought from Gaul to Ireland at an early date, and could explain how Columbanus was familiar with it before he ever left Ireland.

== Legacy ==
=== Ligugé Abbey ===
Founded by Martin of Tours in 360, Ligugé Abbey is one of the earliest monastic foundations in France. The reputation of the founder attracted a large number of disciples to the new monastery; the disciples initially living in locaciacum. or small huts, this name later evolved to Ligugé. Its reputation was soon eclipsed by Martin's later foundation at Marmoutier. As of 2013, the Benedictine community at Ligugé numbered 25.

=== European folk traditions ===
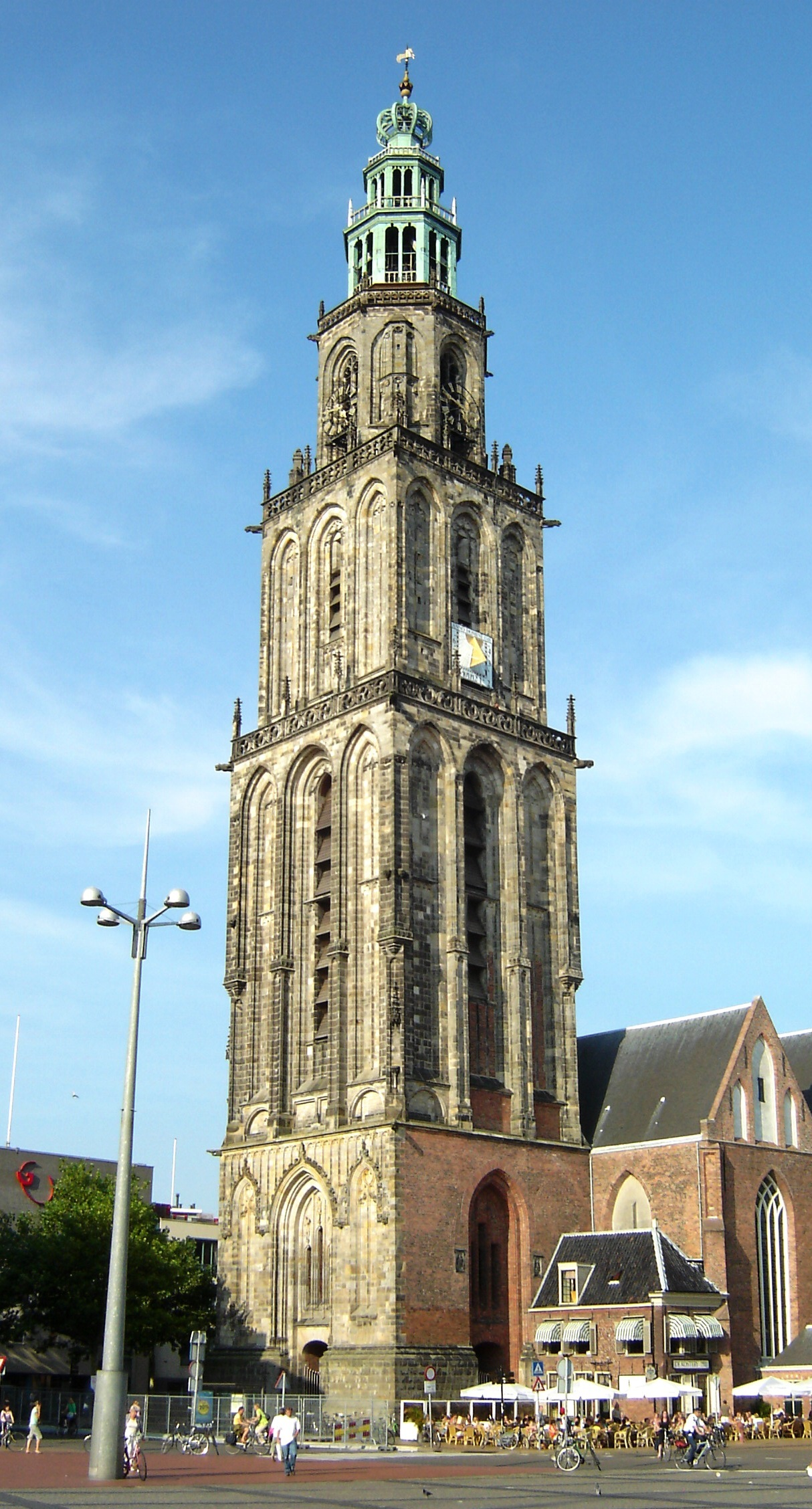
Martinitoren, the 97-metre-high (318 ft) Martini Tower in Groningen, The Netherlands

From the late 4th century to the late Middle Ages, much of Western Europe, including Great Britain, engaged in a period of fasting beginning on the day after St. Martin's Day (also referred to as "Martinmas"), November 11. This fast period lasted 40 days (not including Saturdays and Sundays), and was, therefore, called Quadragesima Sancti Martini, meaning "the forty days of St. Martin" in Latin. On St. Martin's eve and on the feast day, people ate, drank and celebrated before they began to fast. This fasting time was later called "Advent" by the Church, and was considered a time for spiritual preparation for Christmas.

On St. Martin's Day, children in Flanders, the southern and northern parts of the Netherlands, and the Catholic areas of Germany and Austria participate in paper lantern processions. Often, a man dressed as St. Martin rides on a horse in front of the procession. The children sing songs about St. Martin and about their lanterns. The food traditionally eaten on the day is goose, a rich bird. According to legend, Martin was reluctant to become a bishop, and tried to hide in a stable filled with geese; however, the noise made by the geese betrayed his location to the people who were looking for him.

In the eastern part of the Belgian province of East Flanders (Aalst) and the western part of West Flanders (Ypres), traditionally children receive presents from St. Martin on November 11, instead of from Saint Nicholas on December 6 or Santa Claus on December 25. They also have lantern processions, for which children make lanterns out of beets. In recent years, the lantern processions have become widespread as a popular ritual, even in Protestant areas of Germany and the Netherlands, although most Protestant churches no longer officially recognize Saints.

In Portugal, where the saint's day is celebrated across the country, it is common for families and friends to gather around the fire in reunions called magustos, where they typically eat roasted chestnuts and drink wine, jeropiga (a drink made of grape must and aguardente) and aguapé (a sort of weak and watered-down wine). According to the most widespread variation of the cloak story, Saint Martin cut off half of his cloak in order to offer it to a beggar, and along the way, gave the remaining part to a second beggar. As he faced a long ride in a freezing weather, the dark clouds cleared away and the sun shone so intensely that the frost melted away. Such weather was rare for early November, so was credited to God's intervention. The phenomenon of a sunny break to the chilly weather on Saint Martin's Day (11 November) is called Verão de São Martinho (Saint Martin's Summer, veranillo de san Martín in Spanish) in honor of the cloak legend.

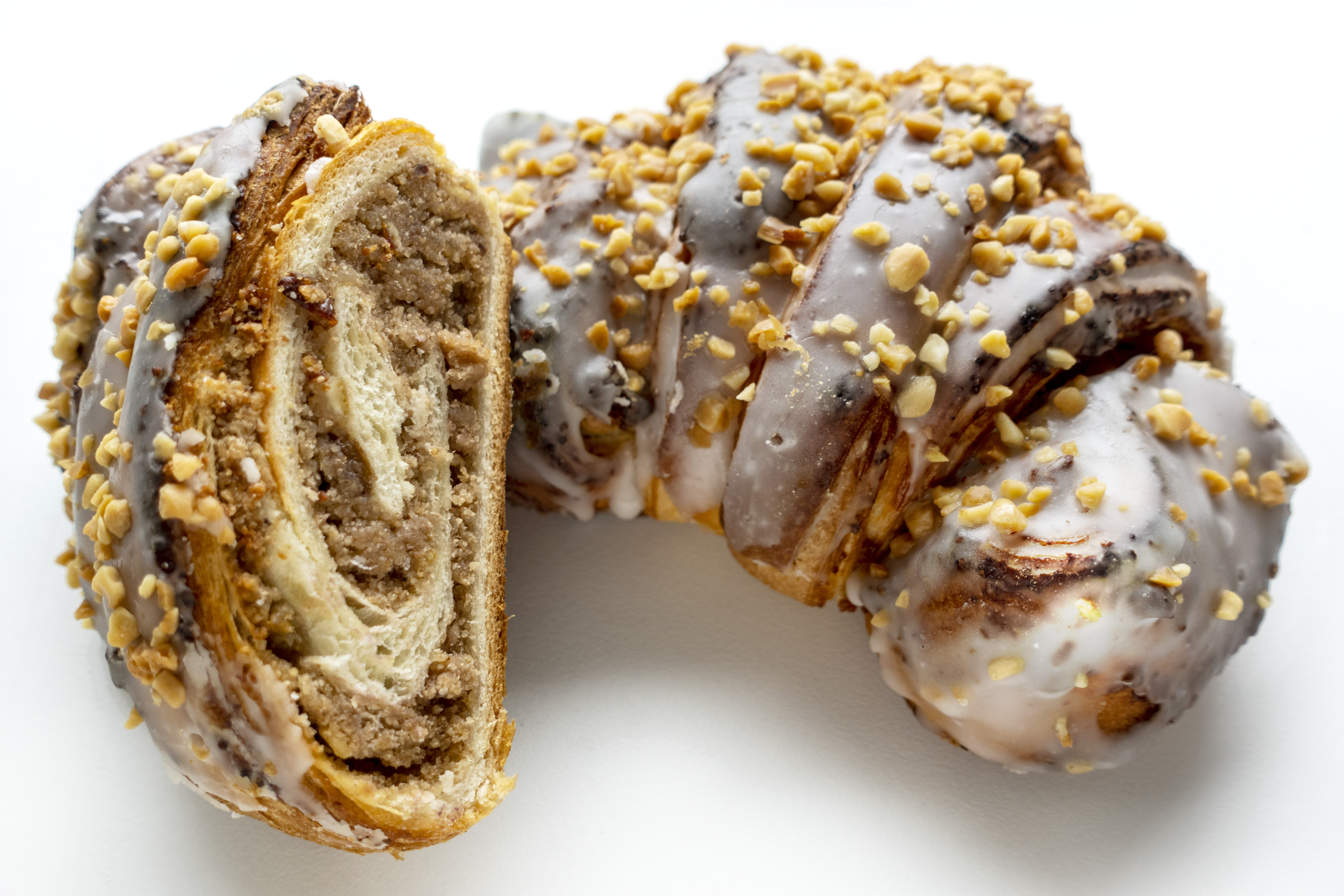
Rogal świętomarciński, baked for St. Martin's Day in Poznań

In many regions of Italy, November 11 is symbolically associated with the maturation of the new wine (hence the proverb, "On Saint Martin's Day, every must becomes wine") and is an occasion for gatherings and celebrations in which people make a toast by uncorking the newly matured wine, often accompanied by chestnuts or roasted chestnuts.

In Malta, on the night of the eve of Saint Martin's day children leave an empty bag next to the bed. When they wake the next day the bag is supposed to be filled with fruit.

Many churches are named after Saint Martin of Tours. St Martin-in-the-Fields, at Trafalgar Square in the centre of London, has a history appropriately associated with Martin's renunciation of war. Dick Sheppard, founder of the Peace Pledge Union, was the vicar from 1914 to 1926, and the site contains a memorial chapel dedicated to him. There is also a plaque commemorating noted Anglican pacifist Vera Brittain. The steps of St Martin-in-the-Fields are often used for peace vigils.

St Martin's Cathedral in Ypres is also dedicated to him.

St Martin's Church in Kaiserslautern, Germany, is a major city landmark. It is located in the heart of the city's downtown in St Martin's Square, and is surrounded by a number of restaurants and shops. The church was originally built as a Franciscan monastery in the 14th century and has a number of unique architectural features.

The Monastery of Saint Martin of Castañeda has been a national historic monument since 1931. It is located in Galende, Sanabria, province of Zamora, Spain. It now functions as an interpretation center.

In Latin America, St. Martin has a strong popular following and is frequently referred to as San Martín Caballero, in reference to his common depiction on horseback. Mexican folklore believes him to be a particularly helpful saint toward business owners.

The largest Anglican church in North America is St Martin's Episcopal in Houston, Texas. It was the home church for many years of President and Mrs. George H. W. Bush and still is for former Secretary of State and Treasury James Baker and his wife Susan.

San Martín de Loba is the name of a municipality in the Bolívar Department of Colombia. Saint Martin, as San Martín de Loba, is the patron saint of Vasquez, a small village in Colombia.

Martin of Tours in the coat of arms of Marttila, Finland

Martin of Tours in the coat of arms of Raisio, Finland

In Finland, the town and municipality Marttila (S:t Mårtens in Swedish) is named after St. Martin and depicts him on its coat of arms.

Though no mention of St. Martin's connection with viticulture is made by Gregory of Tours or other early hagiographers, he is now credited with a prominent role in spreading wine-making throughout the Touraine region and the planting of many vines. The Greek myth that Aristaeus first discovered the concept of pruning the vines, after watching a goat eat some of the foliage, has been adopted for Martin. He is also credited with introducing the Chenin blanc grape varietal, from which most of the white wine of western Touraine and Anjou is made.

Martin Luther was named after St. Martin, as he was baptised on 11 November 1483 (St. Martin's Day), and many older Lutheran congregations are named after St. Martin.

=== In art and modern film ===
The Dutch film Flesh and Blood (1985) prominently features a statue of Saint Martin. A mercenary in Renaissance Italy, named Martin, finds a statue of Saint Martin cutting his cloak and takes it as a sign to desert and rogue around under the saint's protection.

Saint Martin in art

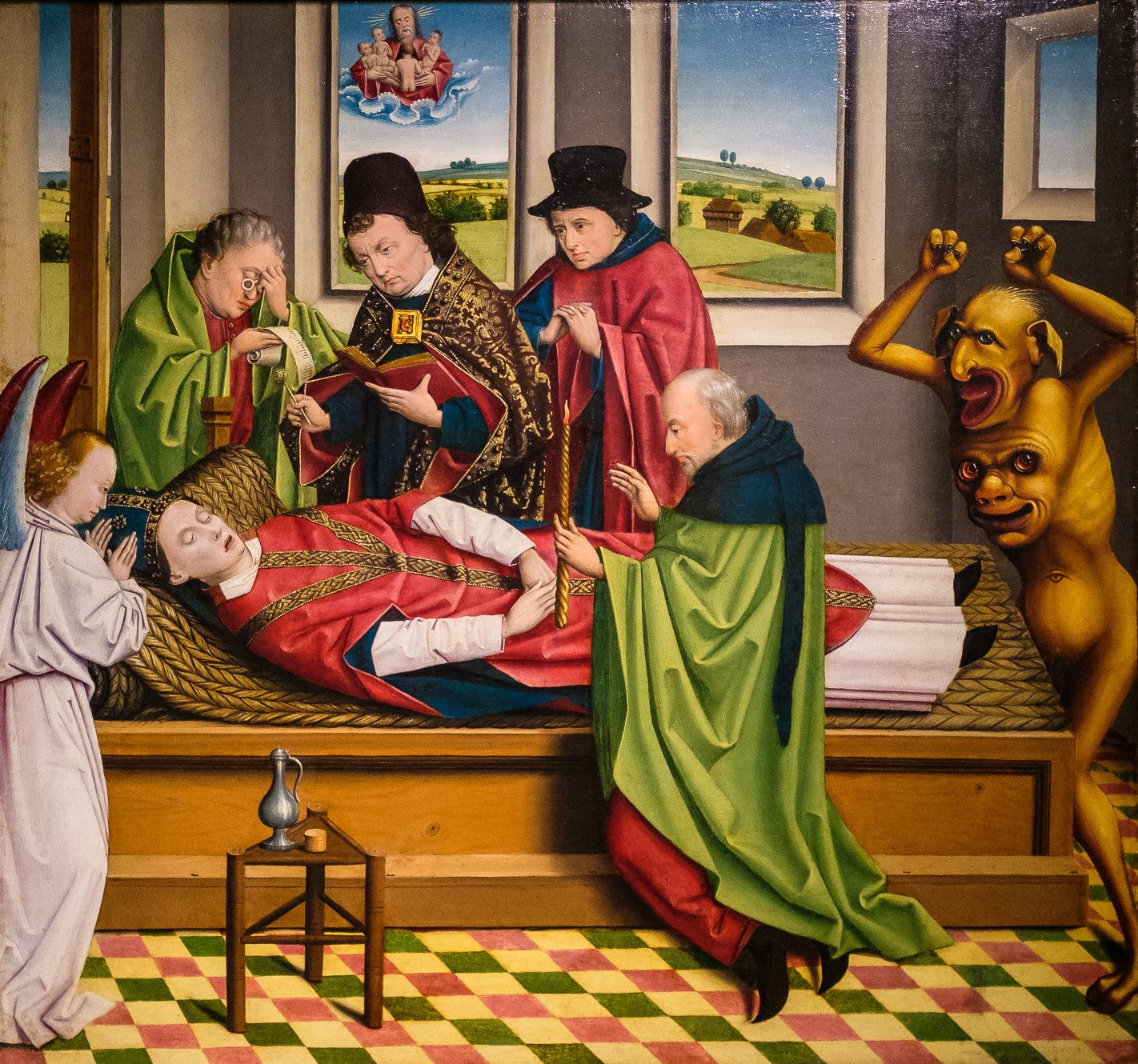
Death of Saint Martin of Tours, by workshop of Derick Baegert, 1490 (LWL-Museum für Kunst und Kultur)

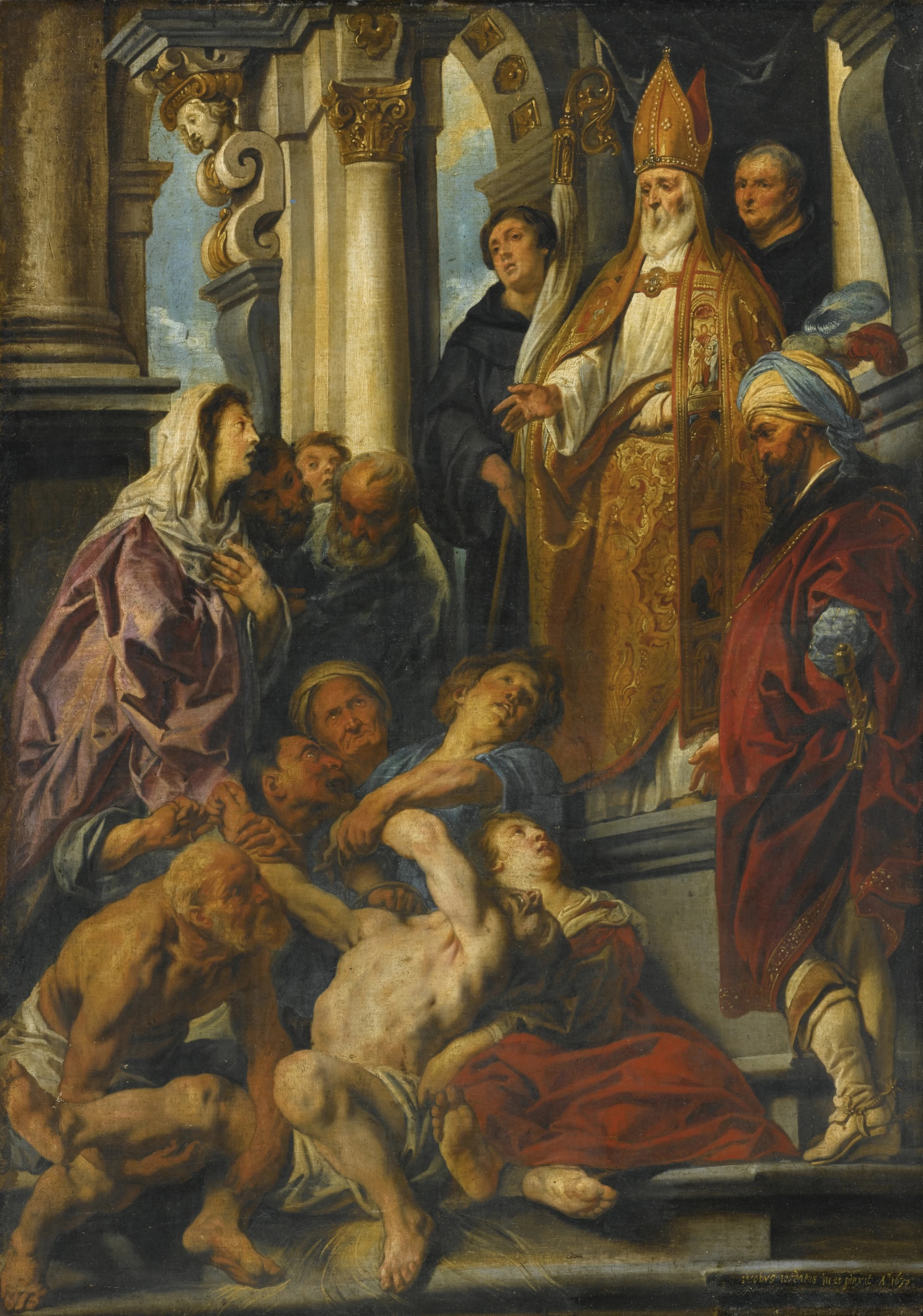
Saint Martin Healing the Possessed Man by Jacob Jordaens, 1630

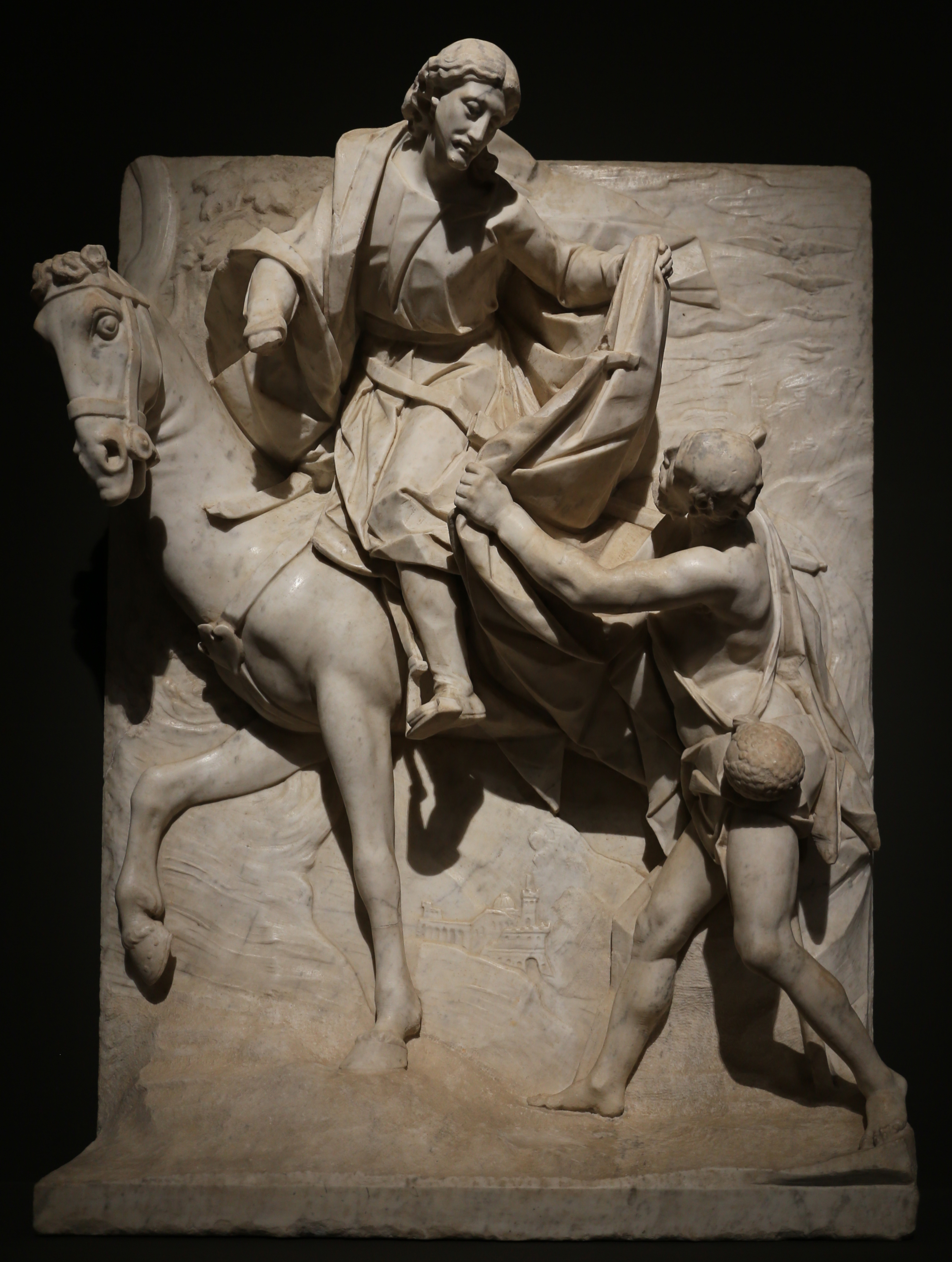
Saint Martin Dividing his Cloak by Pietro Bernini

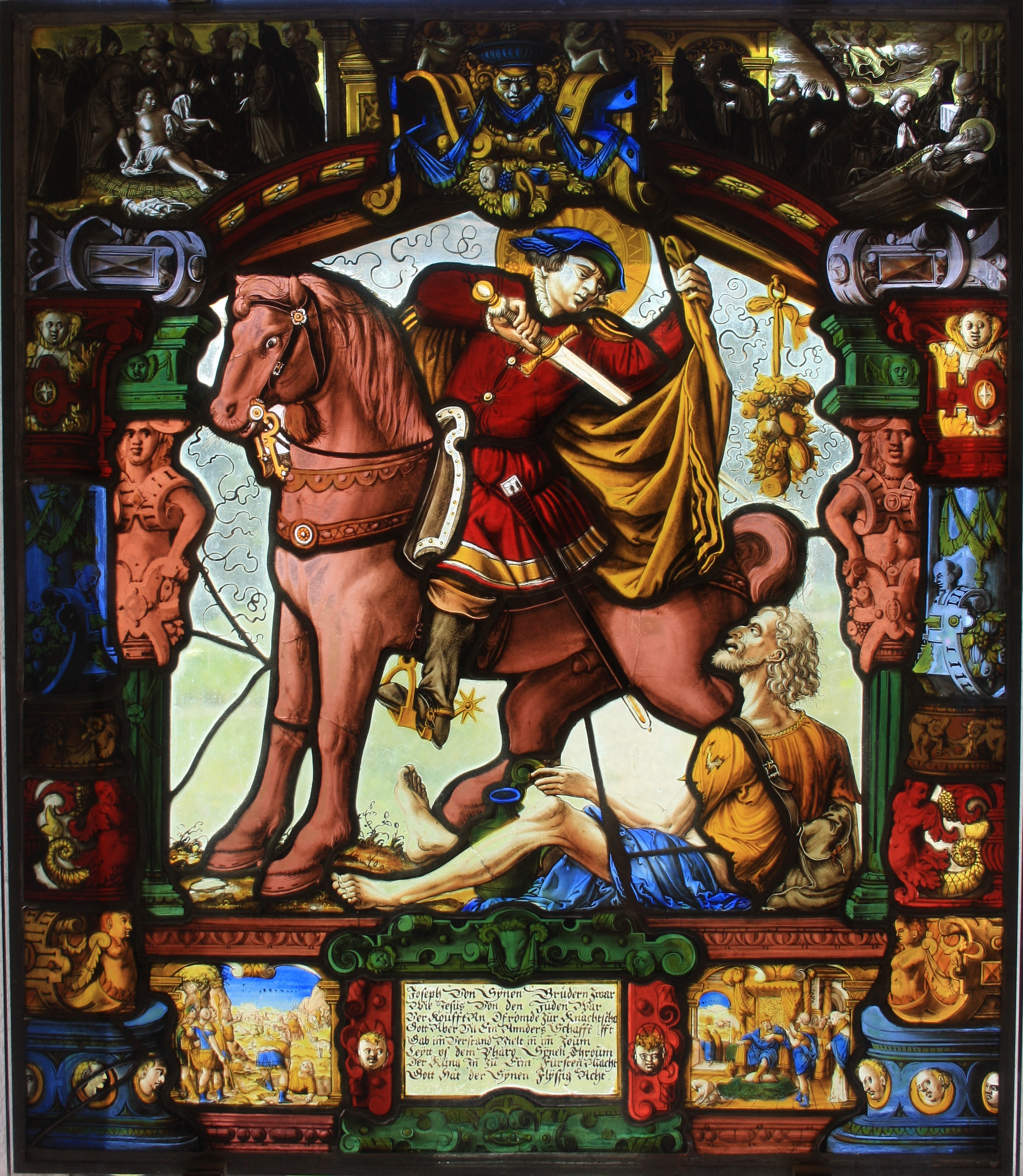
Kloster Wettingen Ost

Bay 20 in Chartres Cathedral portrays the life of St. Martin in a 40-panel stained glass window.

== See also ==
- St. Martin's Day
- The Community of Saint Martin, an association of Roman Catholic priests
- Church of St Martin of Tours (disambiguation)
- Martin (name)
- Saint Martin of Tours, patron saint archive

=== General and cited sources ===
- Brennan, Brian (1997). "The Revival of the Cult of Martin of Tours in the Third Republic". Church History. 66 (3): 489–501. doi:10.2307/3169453. JSTOR 3169453. S2CID 162678372.
- Brunterch, J.-P. (1988). Jean Cuisenier; Rémy Guadagnin (eds.). Un Village au temps de Charlemagne – Moines et paysans de l'abbaye de Saint-Denis, du VIIe siècle à l'an mil (in French). Paris: Musée national des arts et traditions. OCLC 708304882. SUDOC 001398784.
- Chadwick, Henry (1976). Priscillian of Avila – The Occult and the Charismatic in the Early Church. Oxford: Clarendon.
- Chisholm, Hugh, ed. (1911). "Chapel" . Encyclopædia Britannica. Vol. 5 (11th ed.). Cambridge University Press.
- Clugnet, Léon (1910). "St. Martin of Tours" . In Herbermann, Charles (ed.). Catholic Encyclopedia. Vol. 9. New York: Robert Appleton Company.
- Farmer, Sharon (1991). Communities of St. Martin - Legend and Ritual in Medieval Tours. Cornell University Press. ISBN 978-0-801-42391-8.
- Fletcher, R.; Fletcher, R.A. (1999). The Barbarian Conversion – From Paganism to Christianity. University of California Press. ISBN 978-0-520-21859-8.
- Gregory of Tours. Libri Historiarum.
- Hones, William (1835). The Every-Day Book and Table Book. Vol. 1. London: T. Tegg.
- Jacobsen, Werner (1997). "Saints' Tombs in Frankish Church Architecture". Speculum. 72 (4). Mediaeval Academy of America: 1107–1143. doi:10.2307/2865960. JSTOR 2865960. S2CID 162427588.
- Kenny, Louise Mary Stacpoole (1914). "The Story of St. Martin of Tours – Patron Saint of France".
- Kurlansky, Mark (2006). Nonviolence – twenty-five lessons from the history of a dangerous idea. Modern Library Chronicles. New York: Random House. ISBN 0-679-64335-4.
- Lanzi, Fernando (2004). Saints and Their Symbols – Recognizing Saints in Art and in Popular Images. Liturgical Press. ISBN 0-8146-2970-9.
- Ladurie, Emmanuel le Roy; Zysberg, André (1983). "Géographie des hagiotoponymes en France". Annales: Histoire, Sciences Sociales. 38 (6). Cambridge University Press: 1304–1335. doi:10.3406/ahess.1983.411022. ISSN 0395-2649. S2CID 162232272.
- MacCulloch, Daimaid (2009). A History of Christianity – The First Three Thousand Years. Penguin. ISBN 978-1-101-18945-0.
- Pernoud, Régine (2006). Martin of Tours – Soldier, Bishop, and Saint. Translated by Michael J. Miller. San Francisco: Ignatius Press. ISBN 1586170317.
- Réau, Louis (1955). Iconographie de l'art chrétien (in French). Paris: Presses Universitaires de France. OCLC 423468.
- Richter, M. (1999). Ireland and Her Neighbours in the Seventh Century. Four Courts Press. ISBN 978-1-85182-369-7.
- Rodis-Lewis, Geneviève (1999). Descartes – His Life and Thought. Cornell University Press. ISBN 080-1-48627-0.
- Severus, Sulpicius (1894). On the Life of St. Martin. A Select Library of Nicene and Post-Nicene Fathers of the Christian Church. Translated by Alexander Roberts. New York – via Christian Classics Ethereal Library.
- Stancliffe, Clare (1983). St Martin and his hagiographer – History and miracle in Sulpicius Severus. Oxford: Clarendon.
- Touati, François-Olivier (1998). Maladie et société au Moyen âge. Paris/Brussels.

Preceded by Lidorius	Bishop of Tours; 371–397	Succeeded by Bricius
