= Tonfano =

- Frazione
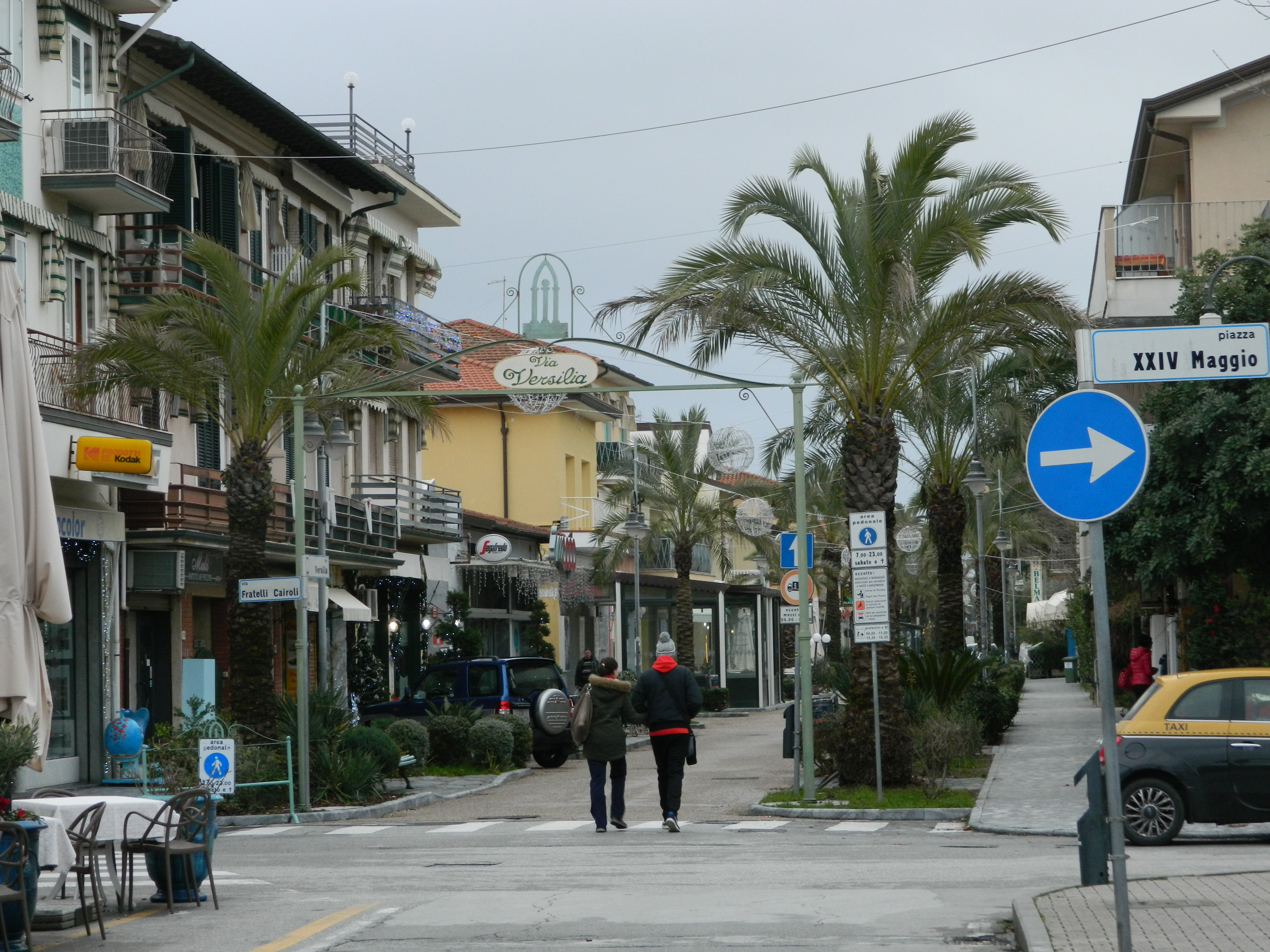
- Via Versilia in Tonfano
- Country: Italy
- Region: Tuscany
- Province: Province of Lucca (LU)
- Comune: Pietrasanta
- Elevation: 0 m (0 ft)
- Time zone: UTC+1 (CET)
  - Summer (DST): UTC+2 (CEST)
- Postal code: 55045
- Dialing code: 0584

Tonfano, originally called ‘Tonfalo’, is one of the four localities in which the frazione of Marina di Pietrasanta is divided, along with Fiumetto, Le Focette and Motrone. The name is derived from that of the river which flowed through the area before it silted up. Tonfano is bordered by Fiumetto to the north and by Motrone to the south.

== History ==
In the 19th century, Tonfano was the most populous settlement of the four localities of Marina di Pietrasanta. The first inhabitants were fishermen, who settled near the mouth of the river. Later on, also those who had already owned land in the area since the 18th century built villas and holiday homes, where they went during the summer months to enjoy the benefits of sea bathing: the fashion of the period.

After the First World War, Tonfano became a tourist seaside resort.

During the Second World War, American soldiers settled in Villa Rebua and Villa Battelli, where they could monitor the landings of small aircraft that served as scouts on the Gothic Line. This landing strip was created by silting up the stretch of the river Tonfano that passed through that area.

After the river disappeared, the bridge that connected Viale Carducci to Via Versilia was also destroyed together with the tramway that passed over it.

== Territory and land reclamation ==
The territory of Tonfano was originally a swamp, just like the neighbouring areas. The first land reclamation projects were carried out in the 16th century by Cosimo I, but the area remained mostly marshy at least until the 19th century.

The River Tonfano was fed by the springs of the village of Vaiana, the so-called polle di Vaiana. That stretch of river flowed almost in parallel with Fiumetto, only to continue further south, following the path of the current Via Tonfano – from which the name derived – and then it flowed into the sea where today the pier stands. During the Second World War its landfill began, leading to the total disappearance of the lake. Only the stretch of river parallel to Fiumetto was spared, although it was redirected and channelled soon enough into the latter.

Along the coastal zone, Tonfano has low-lying, sandy coasts.

== Climate ==
The climate of Tonfano fits into the table of the average climatic conditions of Marina di Pietrasanta; winters are mild and temperate and summers are hot. The average temperature is 14.6 °C (58.3 °F) and the measure of the average annual precipitation is 939 mm (36.969 in).

The hottest month is August with an average temperature of 23.1 °C (73.6 °F), while January is the coldest month with an average temperature of 6.9 °C (44.4 °F). So, the variation of the average temperature during the year is 16.2 °C (61.2 °F).

The driest month is July with an average rainfall of 26 mm (1.0 in), while the rainiest month is October with an average rainfall of 121 mm (4.7 in).

== Economy and tourism ==
The economy is based on the seaside tourism, which started in the 1920s and resumed after the Second World War. At first, seaside establishments were simple huts placed on the beach, before becoming modern tourist resorts with cabins, tents and beach umbrellas.

== Festivals and customs ==
In the first days of June, the patron St Anthony of Padua is celebrated with the blessing of the sea, a recurring religious event begun in 1933 when the church was consecrated to the Saint. The feast day is celebrated in the parish church of St Antony in Tonfano: the parvis of the church is decorated with flowers, and is believed that the blessing of the sea and crafts will bring protection to maritime areas, its inhabitants and boats. Instead, the fair of Marina in fiore occurs in May in order to welcome spring. The majority of stands set up along Via Versilia and Viale Carducci sell flowers and plants, but there are also cooking stands, stands of used books and ones selling various types of handcraft products.

== Historical sites of interest ==
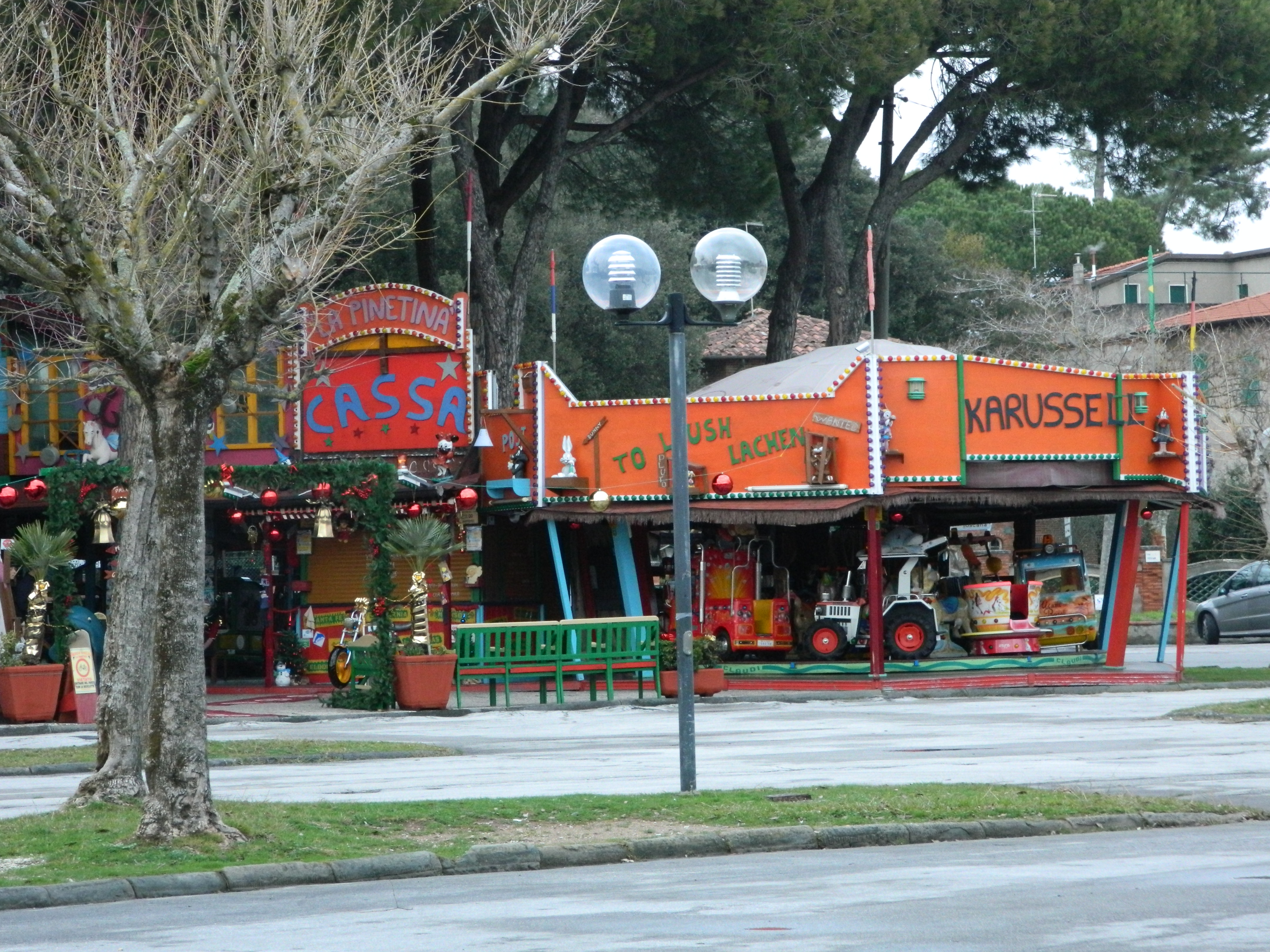
La Pinetina

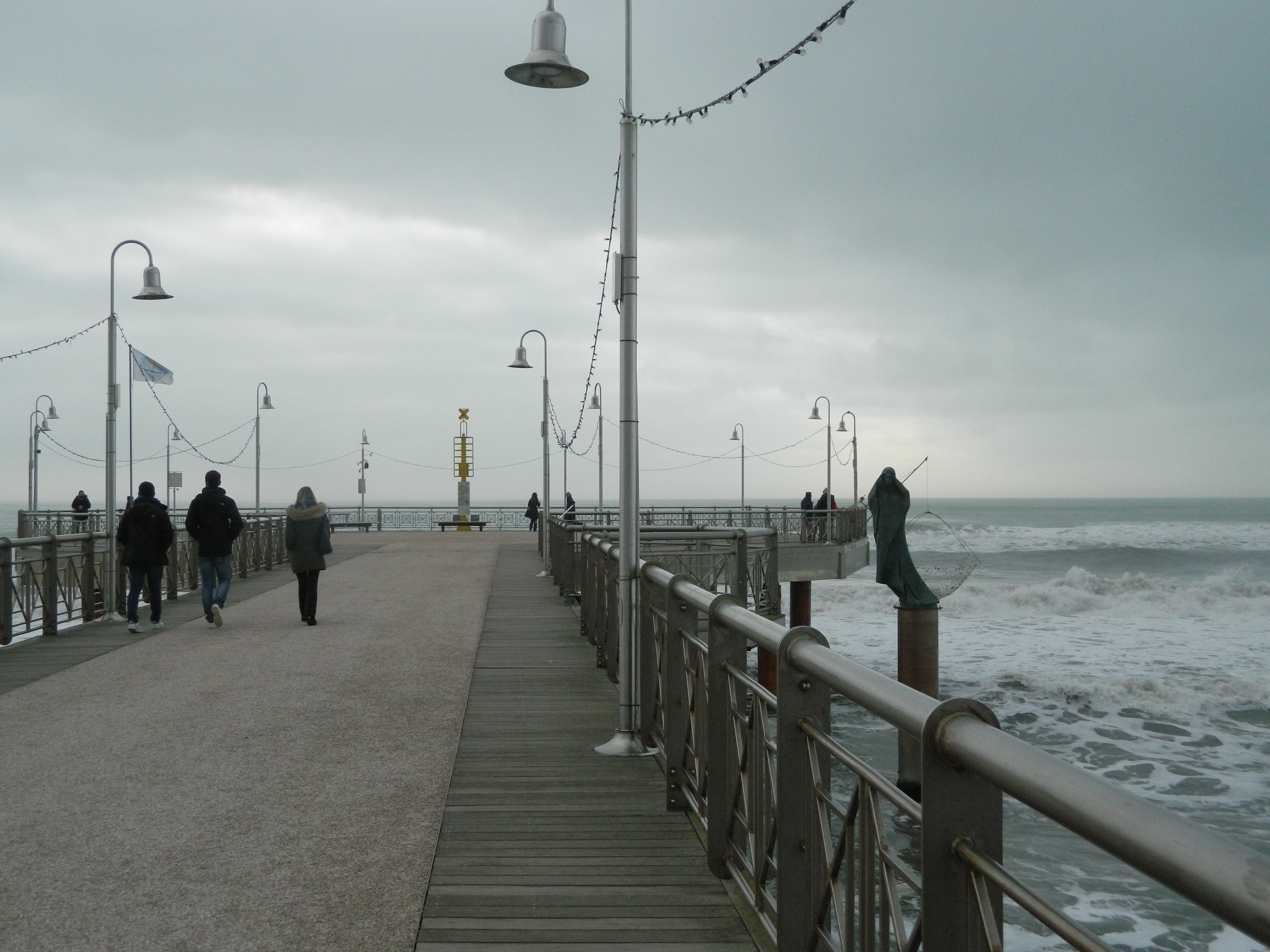
Tonfano Pier on a winter day

Caffè Margherita, located at the beginning of Via Versilia, is a historic bar of the 20th century. It later became a trattoria and then a hotel, and finally a restaurant. Near Via Catalani is la Pinetina, a historical amusement park of Tonfano.

The main attraction of Tonfano is the pier. Built for touristic and recreational purposes, the pier is 380 metres long, 214 of which above the sea, and is 5.64 wide. Works began in December 2003 and continued until autumn 2005. The pier was inaugurated on 14 June 2008. On the pier there are various sculptures, and the pier ends with a decagonal square with a fountain in the middle.

Before the construction of its pier, Tonfano already featured a small one which, however, was blown up by the Germans during World War II, who feared that it might be used as a loading dock.

== Infrastructure and transport ==
The tramway was constructed in the early years of the 20th century, and travels from Via Versilia to Viale Carlucci, passing over the Tonfano bridge and reaching Fiumetto and Forte dei Marmi to the north, Montrone and Le Focette to the south. Today, the CCT Nord company is in charge of the local public transport.

== Bibliography ==
- "Tonfano, duecento metri di passeggiata sul mare: inaugura il nuovo pontile". www.loschermo.it (in Italian). 12 June 2008. Archived from the original on 1 July 2016.
- "Nel bar la storia di Tonfano – Il Tirreno". Archivio – Il Tirreno (in Italian).
- "Auguri Tranvia! Cento anni fa il tram che collegava Pietrasanta e Marina – Arte, Comune Pietrasanta, Cultura Versiliatoday.it". Versiliatoday.it (in Italian). 14 July 2014.
- "The Lands of Giacomo Puccini – Lucca Tuscany". www.puccinilands.it.
