= Mallegni =

Mallegni is a surname. Notable people with the surname include:

- Francesco Mallegni (1940–2025), Italian paleoanthropologist
- Massimo Mallegni (born 1968), Italian politician
