= Ottavio Barsanti =

Italian missionary and author (1825–1884)

Ottavio Barsanti (c.1826–23 May 1884) was an Italian Franciscan priest, writer, and missionary in New Zealand. He was born in Pietrasanta, Italy c.1826.

Barsanti was a professor in Italy for several years, before he travelled to New Zealand in 1860 in response to with Jean-Baptiste Pompallier’s call for missionary workers; he served at Rotorua, Lake Taupo and Parnell.

He published two books, New Zealand and its Inhabitants, and The Savages of New Zealand.
