= Silvia Gemignani =

Italian triathlete (born 1972)

Silvia Gemignani (born September 2, 1972 in Pietrasanta) is an athlete from Italy, who competes in triathlon.

Gemignani competed at the first Olympic triathlon at the 2000 Summer Olympics. She took twentieth place with a total time of 2:05:21.26. At the 2004 Summer Olympics, Gemignani competed again. Her time of 2:08:56.94 earned her a twenty-first-place finish.

Since 1997 till 2007 Gemignani took part in Elite Women ITU races, wherein she came to podium four times. With time 01:54:55, her best in this series, she won 2001 Forte dei Marmi ITU Triathlon European Cup. At 2001 Praia da Vitoria ITU Triathlon European Cup Gemignani finished second.
