= Hanneke Beaumont =

Dutch-born sculptor

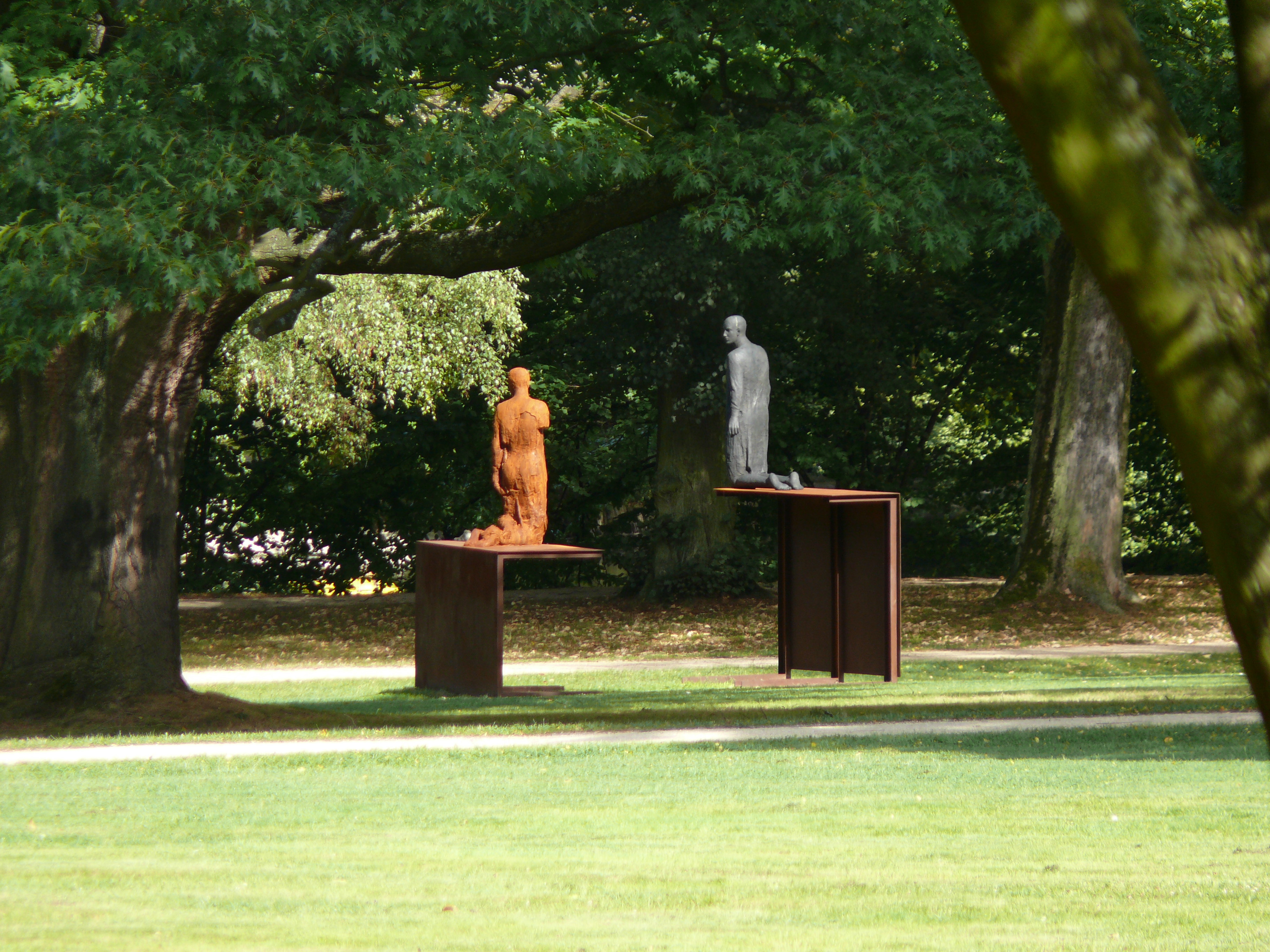
- "Melancholia I" Bad Homburg, 2009
- Born: 1947 (age 78–79); Maastricht the Netherlands
- Education: La Cambre, 1983-1985; De Hogere Rijksschool voor Beeldende Kunsten, 1985-1988
- Known for: Sculpture
- Style: large-scale, figurative artwork
- Website: hanneke-beaumont.com

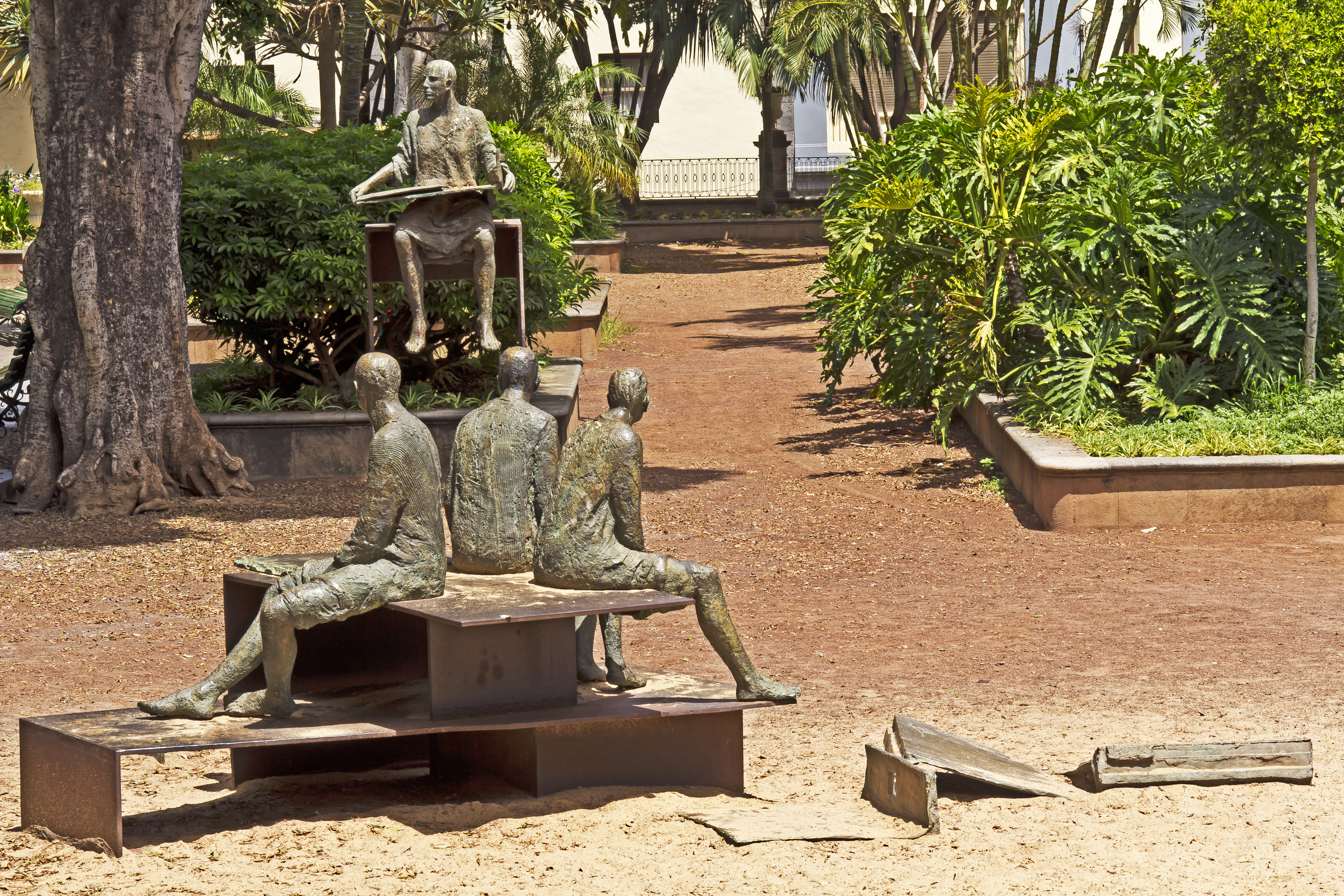
Courage, 1995, by Hanneke Beaumont. Canary Islands, Spain

Hanneke Beaumont (born 1947 Maastricht, the Netherlands) is a Dutch sculptor known for her large scale figurative works in terracotta, bronze and cast iron.

== Early life and education ==
Beaumont was born in 1947 to a large Catholic family in Maastricht. She studied dentistry in the United States in at Forsyth Dental Center and Northeastern University in Boston, Massachusetts but returned to Europe, to start a family in Belgium. Beaumont began her artistic studies in 1977 at the Braine-l'Alleud School of the Arts (Académie de Braine l'Alleud). She received her first solo exhibition in 1983.

Beaumont continued her education at La Cambre, Brussels from 1983 - 1985, followed by studies at Hogere Rijksschool van beeldende Kunsten, Anderlecht from 1985 - 1988.

== Career ==
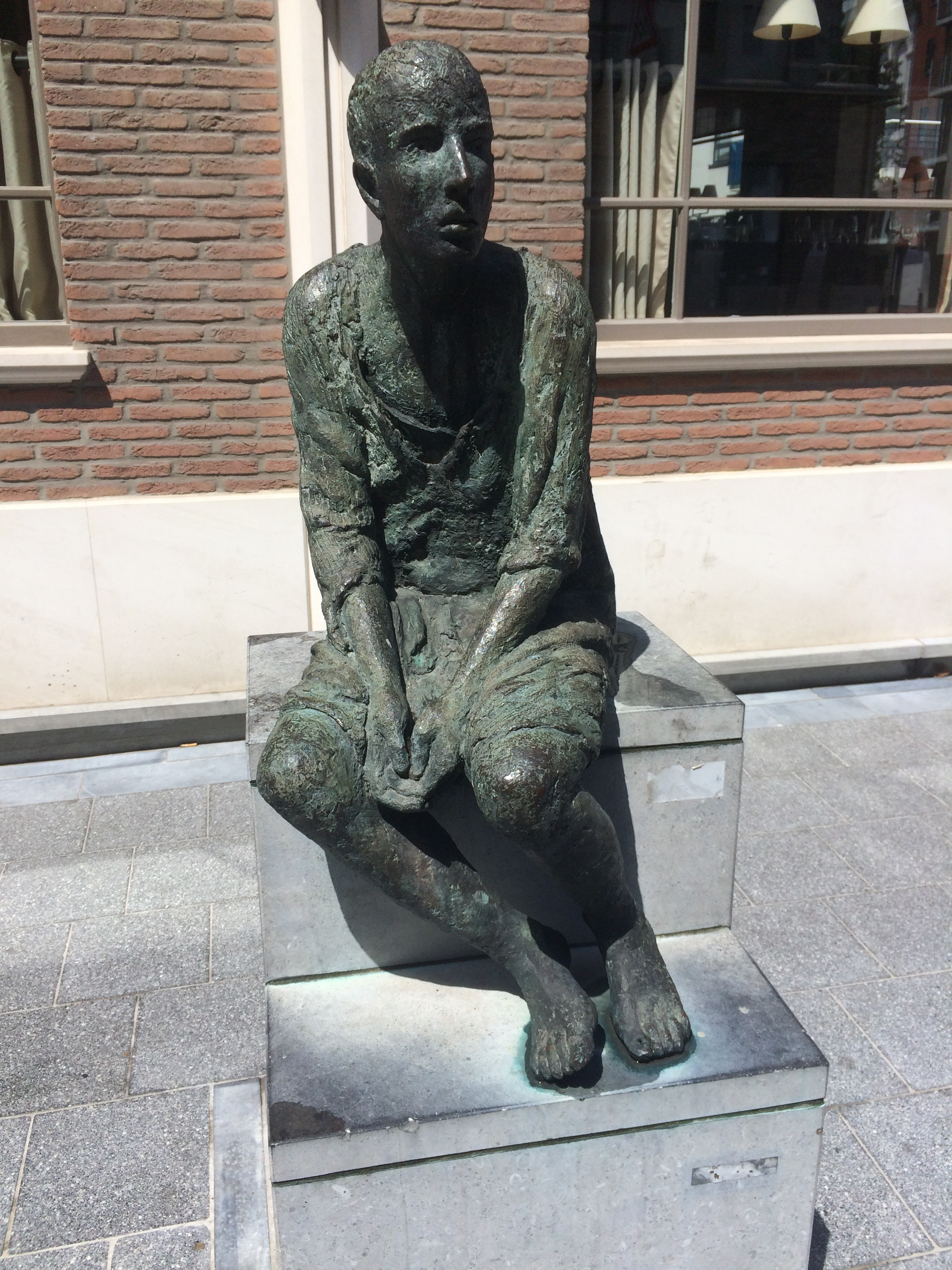
sculpture by Hanneke Beaumont

Beaumont began working in clay and gradually moved into finalizing the work in bronze and cast iron. In 1994, she was honored with a major award from the Centre International d'Art Contemporain, Château Beychevelle, St. Julien, France for her terracotta sculpture group Le Courage. Shortly after, she participated in the second Exposiciòn Internacional de Esculturas en la Calle, organized by the Colegio de Arquitectos de Canarias, in Santa Cruz de Tenerife, Spain, where her work was permanently installed.

Since 2005, various museums have held retrospectives of Beaumont’s art, among which the Beelden aan Zee museum in the Hague, the Frederik Meijer Gardens & Sculpture Park in Grand Rapids, Michigan, Vero Beach Museum of Art and the Baker Museum in Florida, and the Copelouzos Family Art Museum in Athens, Greece.

In Brussels, she is widely recognized for her monumental installations, namely Stepping Forward (2008) installed in front of the European Union Council, Le Courage at the entrance of the Erasmus hospital, the public work Le Départ (1996) at Brussels Airport, and Interaction & Self-Protection in Ganshoren. Present in numerous public and private collections, Hanneke Beaumont has an international reputation and her art is exhibited worldwide. Many other public and private collectors have manifested great interest in her work. She now enjoys an international reputation with exhibitions in the US, UK, Canada, Belgium, France, Germany, Spain, The Netherlands, and Switzerland.

In the United States, she has held several solo shows at the Contessa Gallery in Cleveland, Ohio. In the United Kingdom, her work has been exhibited in a series of solo shows at Robert Bowman Modern in London.

Beaumont has said that she identifies as a "clay person”, and many of her finished works retain the marks made in that material, with surfaces left somewhat rough and unrefined. She began working from live models early in her career but later abandoned this. Her forms have been described as androgynous. Beaumont’s sculptures represent ‘Man’ in the broader sense, she addresses grand issues of the human condition. Many of Beaumont’s figures appear neither male nor female, neither young nor old. They do not appear as portraits of particular individuals, nor are they modeled after idealized human forms. Physically, they are approximations of human beings, and as such, they provide a way to consider, from a distance, general ideas about the nature of the human race.

In 2014, Beaumont moved her home and studio from Brussels to the Netherlands. She spends her studio time working in Pietrasanta, Italy and Middelburg, the Netherlands, where in early 2015 she acquired an 18th century warehouse as a studio.
