= Sant'Agostino, Pietrasanta =

Church building in Pietrasanta, Italy

Coordinates: 43°57′27.18″N 10°13′57.89″E

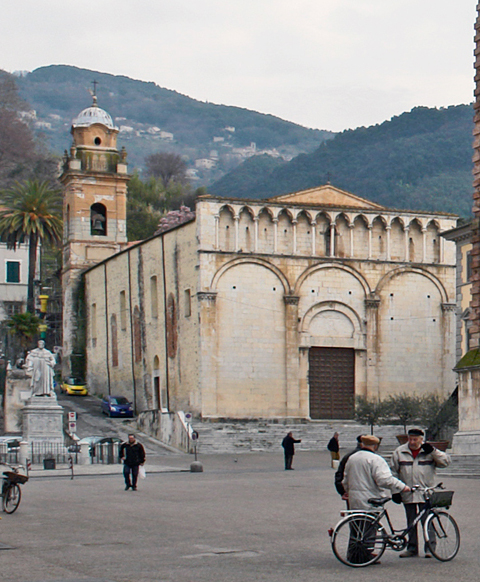
A view of the church

Sant'Agostino is a Romanesque-style, Roman Catholic former-church, located in the town of Pietrasanta in the province of Lucca, Tuscany, Italy.

== History ==
The construction of this church was commissioned by the Augustinian order in the 14th century. The church has a single nave with an awkward entrance with three rounded arches delimited by pilasters upholding a linear top register with twelve acute angle walled up arches. There is a single entrance portal with a smaller round arch in the center. The bell-tower was not added until 1780.
The adjacent convent was suppressed by Napoleonic forces in the 19th century.

The church is presently deconsecrated and used for cultural events.

In an 1896 survey, the first chapel on the right had an altarpiece (1518) by Taddeo Zacchia.
