= Julia Vance =

Norwegian sculptor (born 1968)

Julia Gina Plahte Vance (born 13 July 1968) is a Norwegian sculptor. Having started working in stone in 1992, she now shares her time between working in Oslo and Johansen Monumenthuggeri in Norway and the internationally famous marble-carving studio Studio Sem in the sculpture town of Pietrasanta in Tuscany, Italy.

Julia Vance's carved stone sculptures seem to be bending stone into tightly stretched surfaces with precisely defined curves and edges. Sculptures based on words and letter shapes, as classical form with conceptual expression.

Her first solo-show with sculpture in Norway took place in Bærum Kunstforening in the spring of 2014. Showing over 30 sculptures in Italian marble, and also work in granite, alabaster, glass and bronze, she received a lot of publicity, amongst others on NRK (Norwegian National TV) and by Aftenposten's art-critic Kjetil Røed.

Julia Vance has several times exhibited her sculptures in front of the Norwegian Parliament in Oslo. And the sculpture-group 'WE-ME, expression #5' in front of the main train station of Oslo during 2013, leading to the Council of Oslo buying them and placing them in the new Rommensletta Sculpturepark.

Her sculptures have been acquired by the Councils of Oslo, and of Bærum, Larvik and Os. Her work is also in the collections of larger institutions like The Central Bank of Norway, on the Norwegian coast-liner 'Trollfjord', the Het Depot Gallery (Holland) and with private collectors like John B. Hightower and Alyce Faye.

Curator at the National Museum of Norway put Julia Vance's sculptures in the inheritance of Åse Texmon Rygh, Henry Moore and Barbara Hepworth, but also put her work in context with contemporary artists like Jenny Holtzer. Former director of MoMa in New York, John B. Hightower, said “Julia Vance’s sculpture adds another distinctive flair by transforming traditional calligraphy into blocks and forms more familiar to Isamu Noguchi and Jean Arp.”

Vance's sculptures have been exhibited in Norway, England, Russia, Belgium, Sweden, Italy, Holland and in the United Arab Emirates (by invitation). She has taught and lectured in Norway, England and Belgium and is a member of the Norwegian Sculpture Organisation (NBF, and board-member 2005–2007), a Fellow of the Royal Society of Sculptors, and a member of the Coin Design Advisory Committee of Norway's Central Bank.
