= Massimo Mallegni =

Italian politician (born 1968)

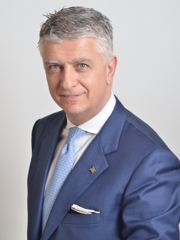

Senator of the Legislature XVIII of Italy
- Incumbent
- Assumed office March 2018
- Constituency: Tuscany

Personal details
- Born: 28 November 1968 (age 57) Pietrasanta, Italy

Massimo Mallegni (born 28 November 1968 in Pietrasanta) is an Italian politician. He is a senator of the Republic of Italy and is a member of the Legislature XVIII of Italy.

== Biography ==
Mallegni was born in Pietrasanta, in the province of Lucca. He is an entrepreneur in the tourism sector. In 1994, he joined Forza Italia. In 1994, he became councillor of the Province of Lucca, until 1997. In 1997, he became mayor in his native town, Pietrasanta, and was reelected three times: in 2000, in 2005 and in 2015. in 2016, Mallegni invited the artist Helidon Xhixha to hold an exhibition of his sculptures, working with local artisans to complete works in bronze and marble.

=== Election as Senator ===
In 2017, he resigned as mayor in view of the following year's general elections, in which he was elected senator in 2018. In December 2019, he was among the 64 signatories (41 of which were from Forza Italia) for the confirmatory referendum on the decrease in the size of the parliament: a few months earlier, the Berlusconian senators had deserted the senate on the occasion of the vote on the constitutional reform. At the beginning of January 2020, he withdrew his signature together with three other Forza Italia senators close to Mara Carfagna.

In August, with the regional elections in Tuscany, he was chosen as regional commissioner of Forza Italia after the resignation of the coordinator Stefano Mugnai.
