= Favalli =

Favalli is an Italian surname. Notable people with the surname include:

- Alessandro Favalli (born 1992), Italian footballer
- Erminio Favalli (1944–2008), Italian footballer
- Giuseppe Favalli (born 1972), Italian footballer
- Lucas Favalli (born 1985), Argentine footballer
- Pierino Favalli (1914–1986), Italian cyclist

== Fictional characters ==
- Favalli, from The Eternaut
