= Federico Favali =

Italian composer of classical music

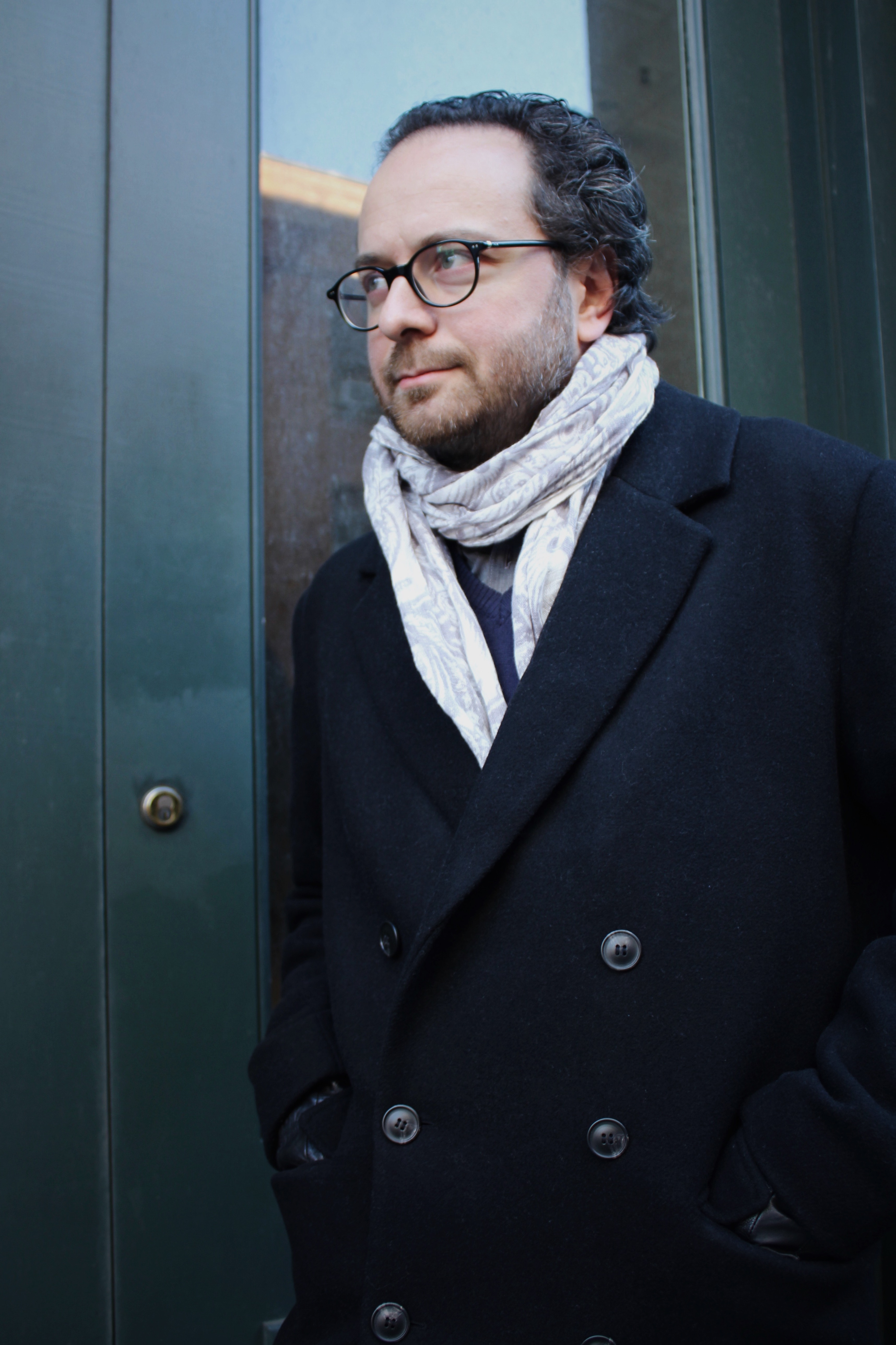
Federico Favali in 2017

Federico Favali (born 17 June 1981) is an Italian composer of classical music.

== Biography ==
Born in Pietrasanta, and raised in Lucca, he began composing as a self-taught student. In 2004, he graduated in piano from Istituto superiore di studi musicali “L. Boccherini” of Lucca, and also graduated in DAMS (fine arts) from the University of Bologna with a thesis on the analysis of the first movement of the quartet op.3 by Alban Berg.

He studied composition at King’s College London, University of Birmingham (PhD), at the Conservatorio “G. Puccini” of La Spezia, at New York University-Steinhardt School.

His music has been performed all over the world (Germany, England, Argentina, Indonesia, Ireland, Australia, South Korea, United States and Japan). Among his various collaborations, the one with the double bass player Gabriele Ragghianti is worth mentioning.

In 2014, the Teatro del Giglio in Lucca commissioned the opera The fall of the house of Usher, inspired by the tale of Edgar Allan Poe. It was staged at the Teatro San Girolamo of Lucca on 4 May 2014.

In 2015, the Municipality of Lucca awarded him as "Lucca man of the year". In the same year, he was invited to Daegu International Contemporary Music Festival (South Korea) and in 2016 at the CrossCurrents Festival in Birmingham. In 2016 and in 2019, he also participated in the Lucca Classica Festival.

In 2016, he was composer in residence of the Associazione Musicale Lucchese for the winter chamber music season. In June, he organized in the Auditorium San Francesco in Lucca the concert "Harmony of the infinite. From San Francesco to the world. Music", dedicated to his music and to the music of the composers from Lucca.

As a musicologist, he mainly deals with the musical analysis of contemporary music. His fields of research are the music of György Ligeti, the music of Thomas Adès, the relationship between Jorge Luis Borges's poetics and contemporary music and the relationships between mathematics and music.

== Main recent compositions ==
=== Chamber music and ensemble ===
- Yemaya (2013)
- Hypothetical spaces (2014)
- Ombre di spazi e silenzi (2014)
- Quando passai di qui era di notte (2015)
- Time, old age, beauty (2015)

=== Solo instrument ===
- Raggio di sole di miele (2010)
- Empire of the light (2012)
- Intimate memories (2013)
- The world is on fire (2015)
- Zreg (2015)
- Metalogicalities (2016)

=== Vocal music ===
- Ocean of time (2012)
- Beltà poiché t’assenti (2013)
- Spontanea terra (2014)

=== Orchestra ===
- La meravigliosa storia delle onde del mare (2011)
- Sun salutation (2017)

=== Theatre ===
- Il crollo di casa Usher (2013–2014)
