= Church of St Martin of Tours =

Church of St Martin of Tours may refer to:

- Church of St Martin of Tours (San Martín del Rey Aurelio)
- St Martin of Tours' Church, Saundby
- St. Martin of Tours' Church (Bronx)
- Sanctuary of San Martino
