= Pietrasanta =

Pietrasanta Pietrasanta
- Comune
- Città di Pietrasanta
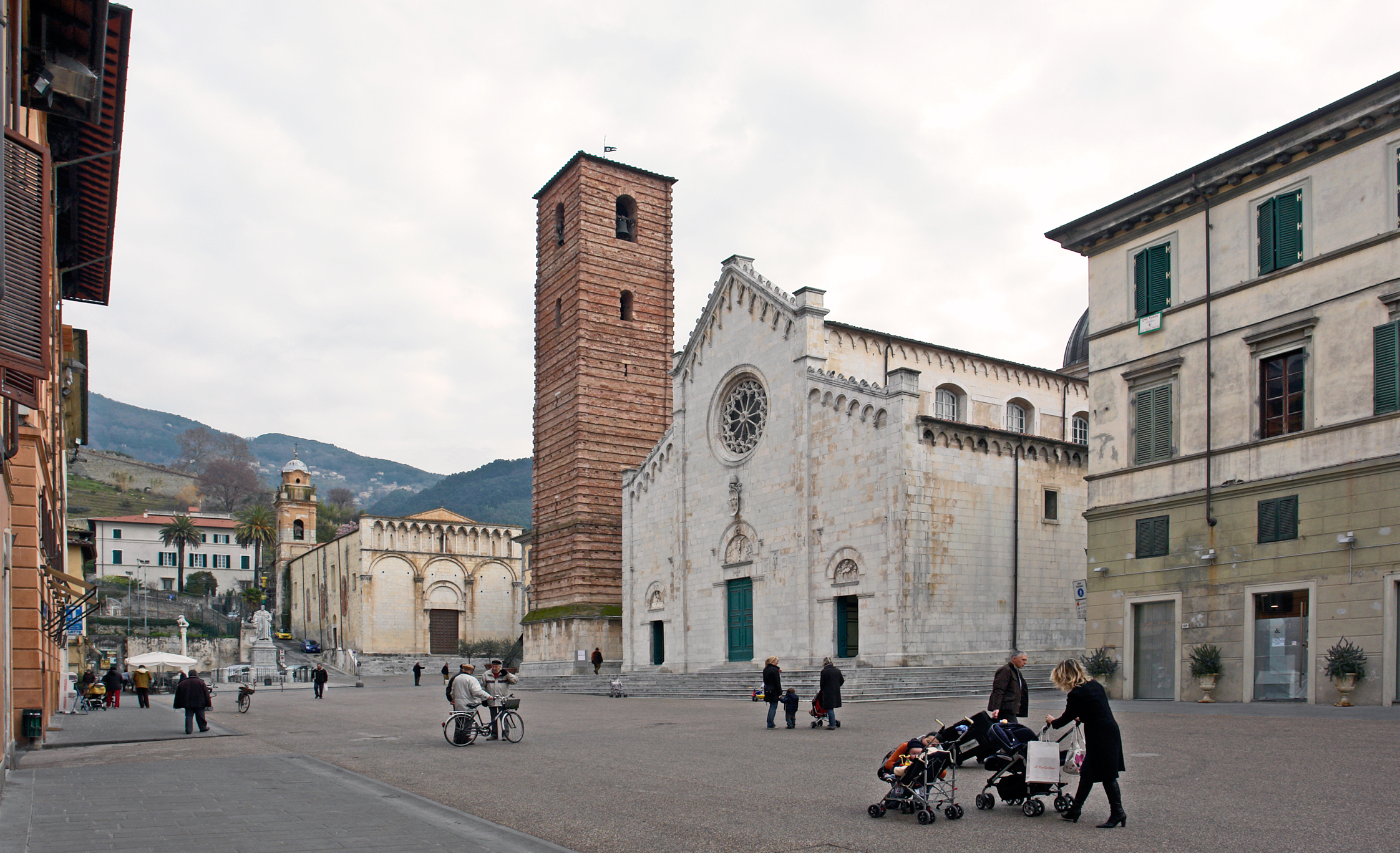
- Cathedral square with the church of Sant'Agostino in the background.

- Coat of arms

- Location within Italy Location within Tuscany
- Coordinates: 43°58′N 10°14′E
- Country: Italy
- Region: Tuscany
- Province: Lucca (LU)
- Frazioni: Capezzano Monte, Capriglia, Strettoia (Montiscendi), Traversagna (Pollino), Vecchiuccio, Vallecchia, Solaio, Vitoio, Castello, Valdicastello, Crociale (Ponte Rosso), Africa (Pisanica), Macelli, Osterietta, Marina di Pietrasanta (Fiumetto, Tonfano, Motrone, Focette), Città Giardino (Le Pere)

Government
  - Mayor: Alberto Stefano Giovannetti

Area
  - Total: 41 km^{2} (16 sq mi)
- Elevation: 14 m (46 ft)

Population (31 March 2018)
  - Total: 23,666
  - Density: 580/km^{2} (1,500/sq mi)
- Demonym: Pietrasantini or Pietrasantesi
- Time zone: UTC+1 (CET)
  - Summer (DST): UTC+2 (CEST)
- Postal code: 55044, 55045
- Dialing code: 0584
- Patron saint: Sts. Blaise and Martin
- Saint day: February 3
- Website: Official website

Pietrasanta is a town and comune on the coast of northern Tuscany in Italy, in the province of Lucca. Pietrasanta is part of Versilia, on the last foothills of the Apuan Alps, about 32 kilometres (20 mi) north of Pisa. The town is located 3 kilometres (1.9 mi) off the coast, where the frazione of Marina di Pietrasanta is located.

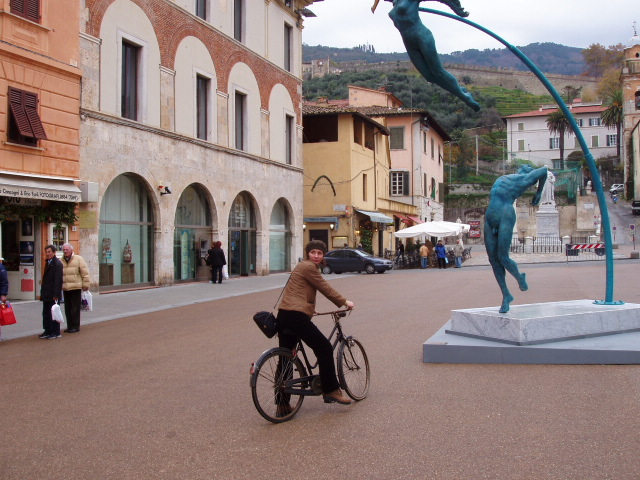
Main square of Pietrasanta.

It is situated on the main road and rail link from Pisa to Genova, just north of Viareggio.

== History ==
The town has Roman origins and part of the Roman wall still exists.

The medieval town was founded in 1255 upon the pre-existing "Rocca di Sala" fortress of the Lombards by Luca Guiscardo da Pietrasanta, from whom it got its name. Pietrasanta was at its height a part of the Republic of Genoa (1316–1328). The town is first mentioned in 1331 in records of Genoa, when it became a part of the Lucca along with the river port of Motrone, and was held until 1430. At that time it passed back to Genoa until 1484, when it was annexed to the Medici held seigniory of Florence.

In 1494, Charles VIII of France took control of the town. It remained a Luccan town again until Pope Leo X, a member of the Medici family, gave Pietrasanta back to his family. The town then became the capital of the Capitanato di Pietrasanta (Captaincy of Pietrasanta), which included all the main settlements of the historical heart of Versilia.

The town suffered a long period of decline during the 17th and 18th centuries, partially due to malaria. In 1841, Grand Duke Leopold II of Tuscany promoted several reconstruction projects (including the building of schools specially created to teach carving skills, and the reopening of the once famous quarries).

== Culture ==
The area, like most of Tuscany in general, has long enjoyed the patronage of artists. Pietrasanta grew to importance during the 15th century, mainly due to its connection with marble. Michelangelo was the first sculptor to recognize the beauty of the local stone. It has continued to attract many artists including Fernando Botero, Joan Miró, Henry Moore, and Damien Hirst. The town is still home to over 50 marble workshops and bronze foundries.

== Main sights ==
- Collegiata di San Martino (Duomo or Cathedral, 13th-14th centuries).
- Sant'Agostino (15th century), Romanesque-style deconsecrated church, now seat of art exhibitions. It includes remnants of 14th-15th centuries frescoes.
- The Gothic Civic Tower.
- Column and Fountain of the Marzocco (16th century).
- Palazzo Panichi Carli (16th century).
- Palazzo Moroni (16th century), home to the local Archaeological Museum.
- Museo dei Bozzetti, with over 700 sculptures by international artists
- Musa, the Virtual Museum of Sculpture and Architecture

== Notable people ==
- Eugenio Barsanti, together with Felice Matteucci invented the first version of the internal combustion engine in 1853
- Ottavio Barsanti, New Zealand missionary, priest and writer born in Pietrasanta
- Fernando Botero, Colombian painter and sculptor, lived in the commune
- Julia Vance, Norwegian Sculptor, lives in the commune
- Hanneke Beaumont, Dutch-born sculptor, lives in the commune
- Romano Cagnoni, Italian photographer, was born and lived in the commune
- Giosuè Carducci, poet and teacher; recipient of 1906 Nobel Prize in Literature
- Carlo Carli, politician
- Christian Dalle Mura, footballer
- Corinna Dentoni, tennis player
- Giulio Donati, footballer
- Federico Favali, composer of classical music
- Irene Fornaciari, opera singer
- Cesare Galeotti, composer, conductor and concert pianist was born in Pietrasanta on 5 June 1872. He was best known for his opera Anton and Dorisse
- Silvia Gemignani, Olympic triathlete
- Kathleen Jones, English biographer and poet, lives in the commune
- Robert Kubica, Polish F1 driver, lives in the commune
- Massimo Mallegni, Italian Senator and former Mayor of Pietrasanta
- Leonardo Massoni, footballer
- Igor Mitoraj, Polish sculptor, lived in the commune
- David Philippaerts, Grand Prix motocross world champion
- Diego Romanini, race car driver
- Santino Spinelli, musician and composer
- Luca Tesconi, Olympic sport shooter
- Nicola Vizzoni, Olympic hammer thrower
- Neil Estern, American Sculptor
- Morten Søndergaard, Danish poet
- Jørgen Haugen Sørensen, Danish sculptor
- Kirsten Ortwed, Danish sculptor
- Håkon Anton Fagerås, Norwegian sculptor

== Sister cities ==
Pietrasanta is twinned with

- Écaussinnes, Belgium
- Grenzach-Wyhlen, Germany
- Villeparisis, France
- Zduńska Wola, Poland
- (United States) Montgomery, USA
- Utsunomiya, Japan
