= Mount Contrario =

Mountain in Italy

Coordinates: 44°07′06″N 10°12′25″E

Mount Contrario is a mountain belonging to the Apuan Alps chain, that lies 1,789 m (5,869 ft) above sea level. It is located in upper Tuscany, Italy, between the provinces of Lucca and Massa-Carrara; it is part of the Apuan Alps Regional Park.

Some marble quarries are located on this mountain, and as in the larger Apuan Alps, have invited harsh criticism from the No Cav environmental movement, which calls for closure of the quarries due to their environmental impact.

== Features ==
The mountain is located in the Apuan Alps range. The peak rises on the ridge that separates the municipality of Massa from that of Minucciano, and is between Mount Cavallo to the east and Mount Grondilice to the west.

Mount Contrario is located right in the center of the main axis of the Apuan watershed, which runs from North-West to South-East and is parallel to the coast, so that the mountain is clearly visible from all over Versilia. In terms of its morphology, the southern slope is made up of a predominantly marble bastion, about 700 meters high, and wild valleys that fall towards the Frigido river and the Valle degli Alberghi, above Massa. The northern side, facing the Serenaia valley and the Serchio valley, is less steep and is covered by beech forests.

At the base of the overhanging southern rock face of Monte Contrario, there is the characteristic Casa degli Alberghi, now abandoned, where the quarrymen lived in past centuries, as well as an ancient marble quarry where they used excavation techniques prior to the introduction of the helical wire for cutting the blocks.

== Access to the summit ==
The least difficult access paths to the summit are found on the northern side, although the simplest routes still involve overcoming mountaineering difficulties. You can start from Castelnuovo di Garfagnana, continue towards Minucciano and the Donegani refuge, at 1,150 meters above sea level, in the locality of Orto di Donna and beyond. You then go up a path to the mouth of Monte Cavallo and along a rocky ridge to the summit, from which the view extends 360 degrees over the entire Apuan chain, Versilia, the sea, the Tuscan Archipelago and Corsica. A slightly less demanding alternative is to reach the summit along the ridges of the watershed.
