= Frigido =

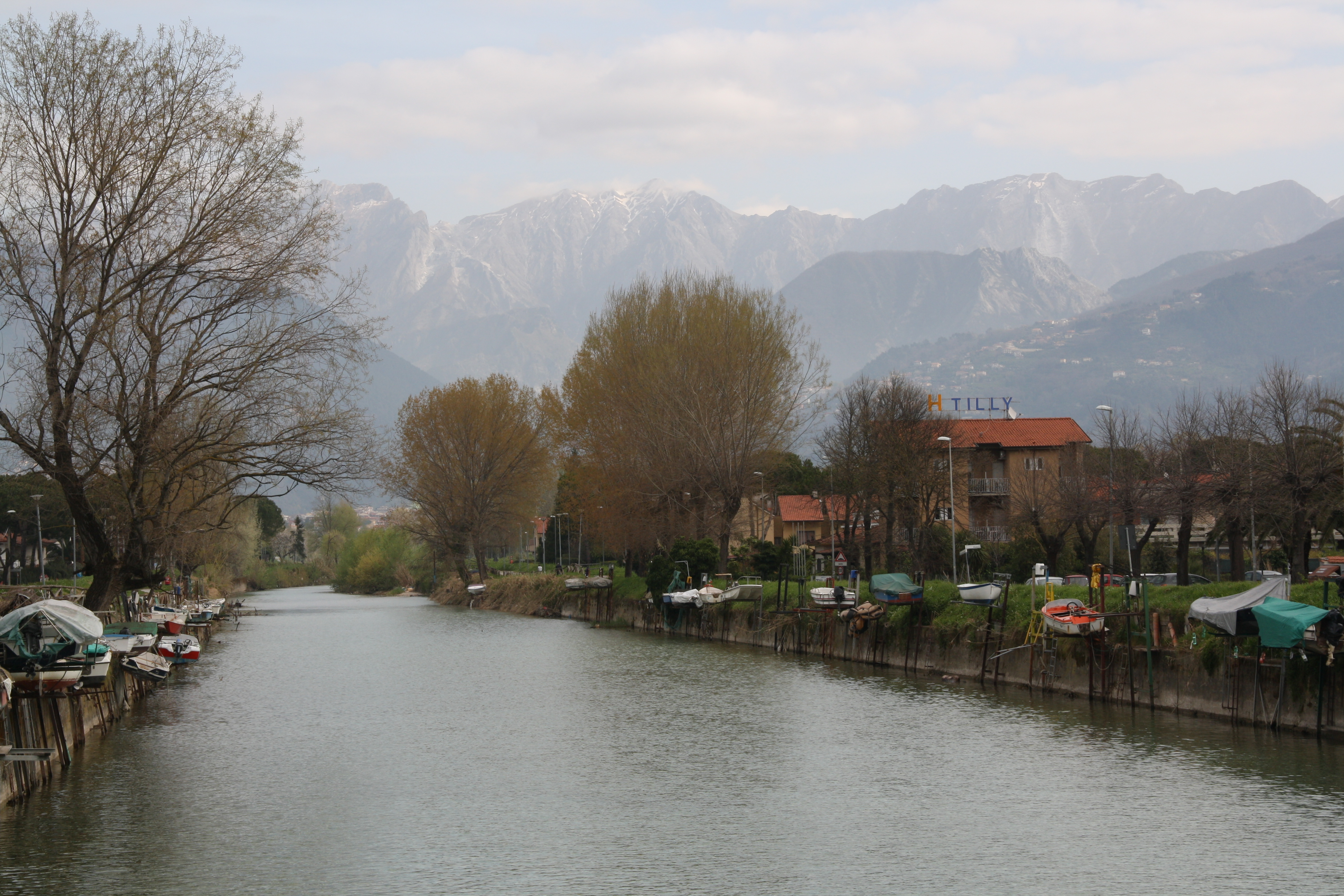

Location
- Country: Tuscany, Italy

Physical characteristics
- Source
  - location: Mounts Sagro and Rasore; eastern branch from Monte Cavallo
  - elevation: c. 1,750 m (5,740 ft)
- Mouth: Ligurian Sea
  - coordinates: 44.0036°N 10.1042°E
  - elevation: 0 m (0 ft)
- Length: 17 km (11 mi)
- Basin size: 61 km^{2} (24 sq mi)
- Discharge
  - average: 6.44 m^{3}/s (227 cu ft/s)

The Frigido is a short river in Tuscany, central Italy, whose course of 17 km is entirely included in the province of Massa-Carrara. It starts from two branches, one having its source in the Monte Sagro and Monte Rasore (Apuan Alps), the other near the village of Forno.

After running through a deep valley in the Apuan Alps, it receives the waters of the Renara and Fosso d'Antona, and then flows in Massa before reaching the Ligurian Sea near Marina di Massa.
