= No Cav =

Italian protest movement

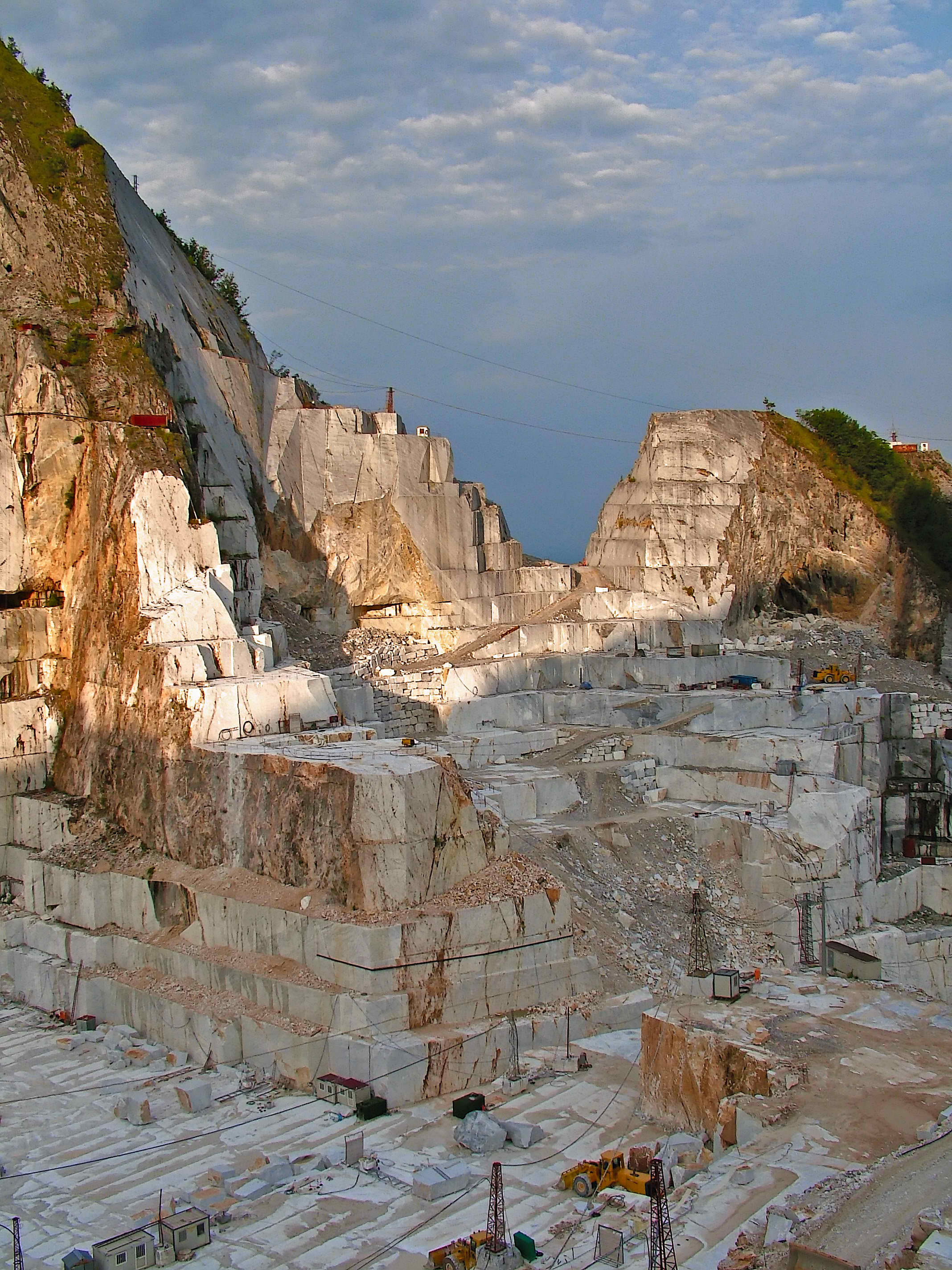
Cava di Gioia, (Gioia Quarries), Carrara, and the irreversible modification of the peak shape

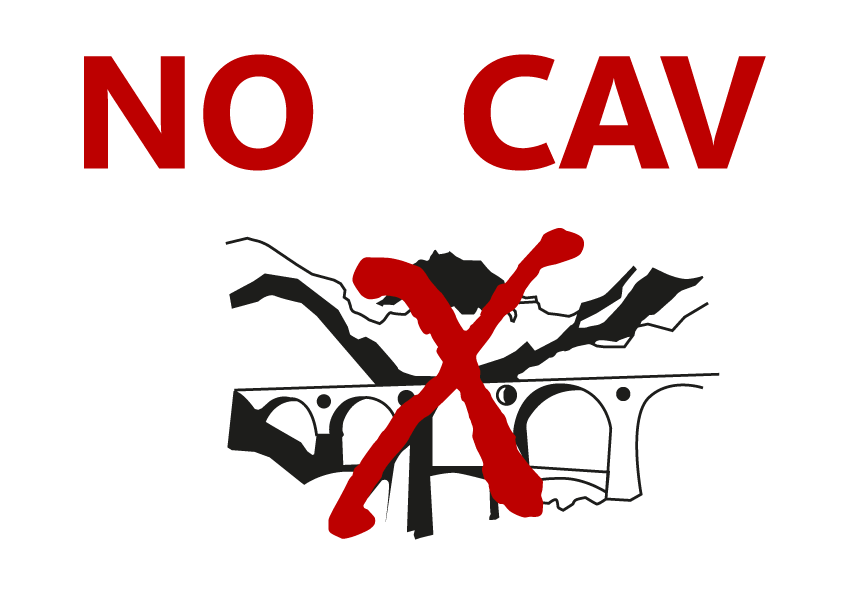
No Cav Flag

No Cav is an Italian protest movement that arose in the early 21st century, criticising the Carrara marble and carbonate quarries in the Apuan Alps.

== Name and flag ==
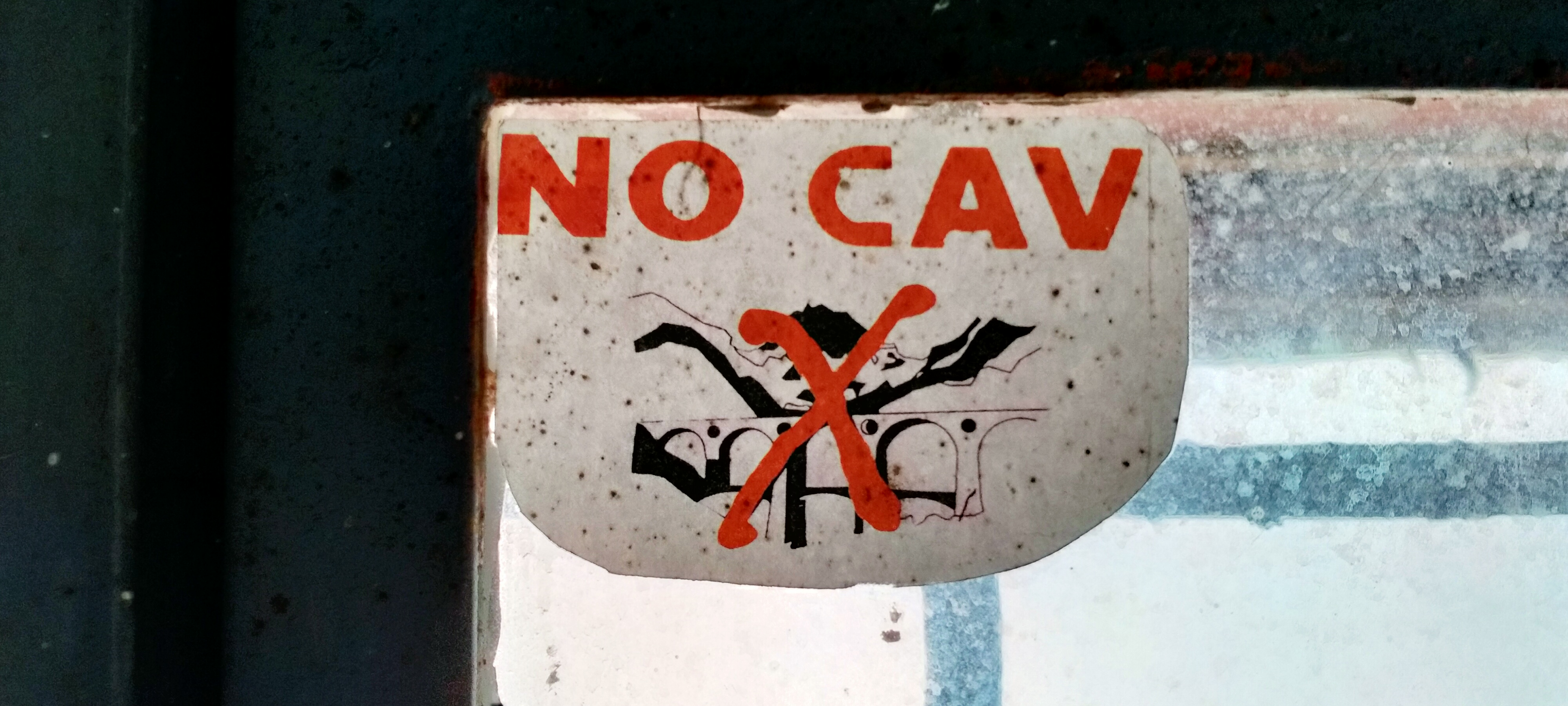
No Cav sticker at Bivacco Aronte (Passo della Focolaccia, Alpi Apuane)

The phrase No Cav, short for "No Cave" (No Quarries, in Italian), was used for the first time in an article from Il Tirreno in 2014 to define the activists who had taken part in a demonstration organized by Salviamo le Apuane (Save Apuan Alps).

The No Cav flag is a stylized black and white representation of the Vara viaduct of the Carrara Private Marble Railway crossed by a large red X, above which are the words "NO CAV", also in red, on a white background.

This symbol, whose graphic design recalls that of the Italian No TAV movement, first appeared in 2020, during an event organized by the environmentalist Gianluca Briccolani, who the following year, with Claudio Grandi and others, founded the Apuane Libere (Free Apuan Alps) association.

The flag and the word "No Cav" itself are neither used nor accepted by all groups of this movement and some of them prefer to use more specific definitions.

== Characteristics ==
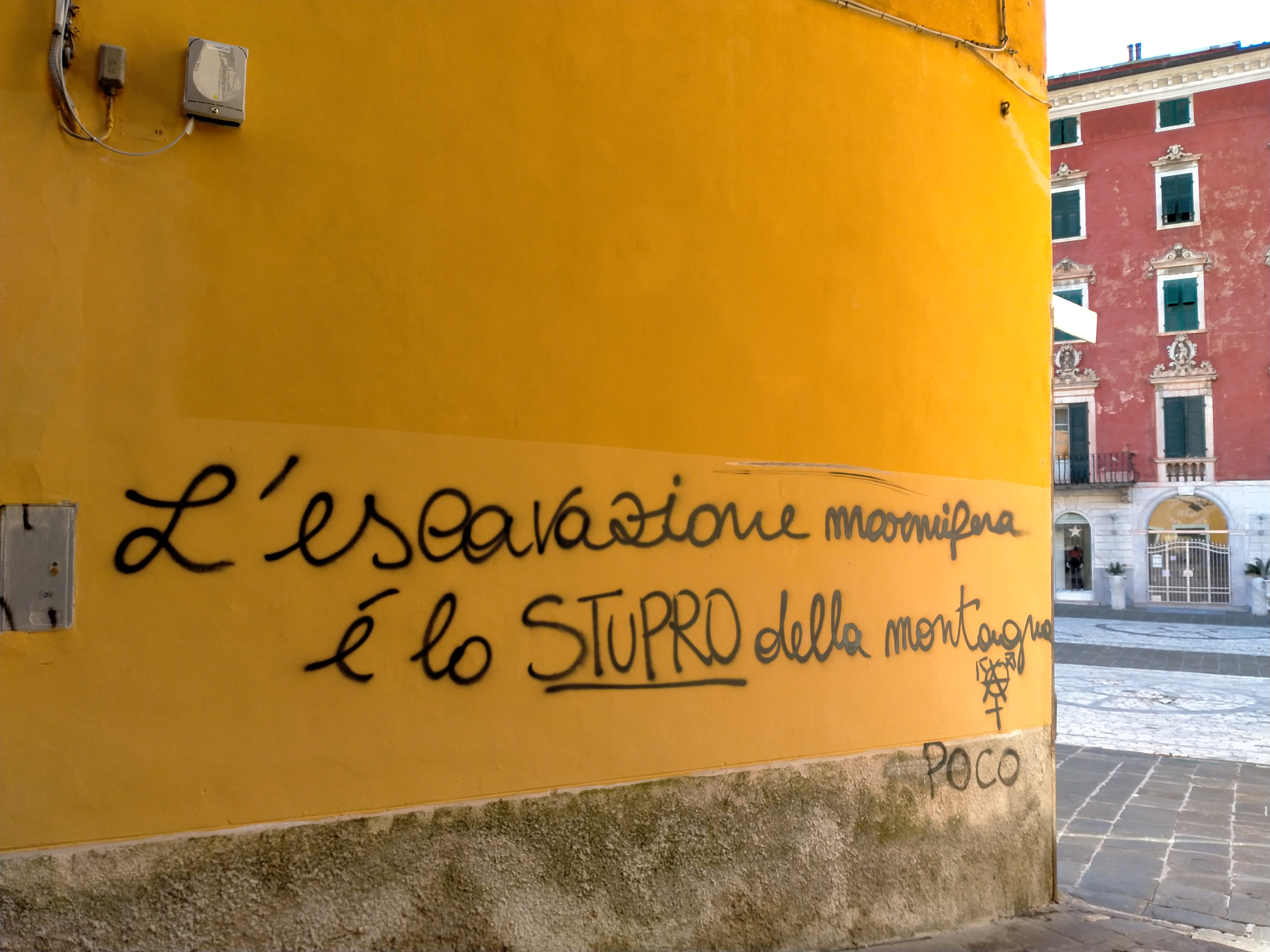
"No Cav" slogan in Carrara, 2021

The No Cav movement is classified by the Italian Atlas of Environmental Conflicts, part of the Environmental Justice Atlas, as a "proactive conflict in favor of sustainable alternatives".

Over the years, environmentalists have managed to develop in civil society a widespread movement of opinion sensitive to the theme of safeguarding the Apuan Alps.

The methods of opposition used by No Cav activists include demonstrations, marches, flash mobs, appeals, petitions, demonstrative actions (such as the one at the Giro d'Italia 2021 or on the summit of Mont Blanc), roadblocks, lawsuits, political initiatives (at local, regional, national, European and international level), public information, pressure on companies, preparation of independent documents, and media activism.

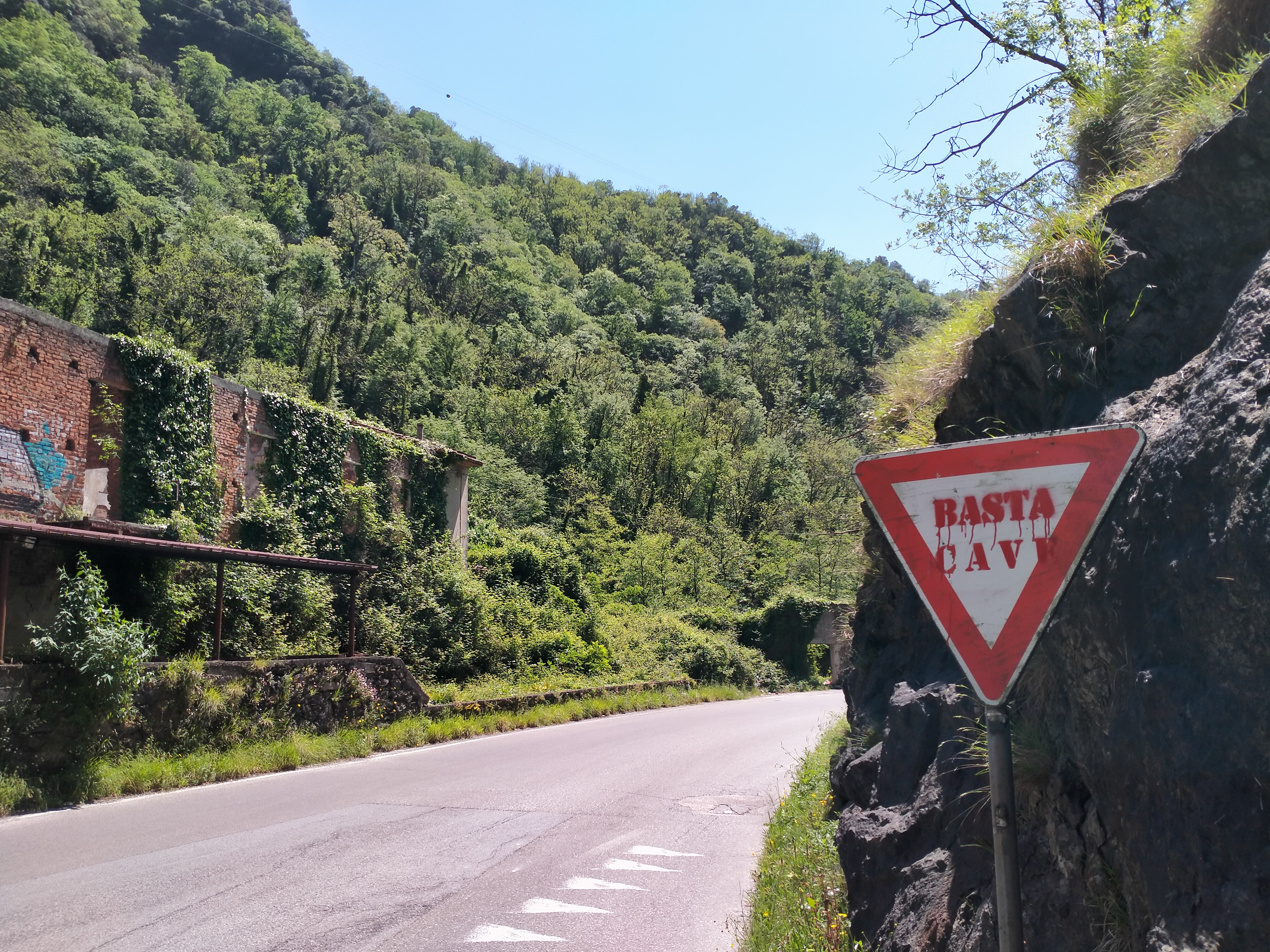
"No Cav" slogan on a road sign near the village of Canevara (Massa)

Among the campaign slogans that have arisen from demonstrations, besides No Cav, there is "Basta Cave" (lit. Enough Quarries: Stop the Quarries), "Giù le mani dalla montagna" (Hands off the Mountain), "Fermiamo la devastazione" (Let's stop the Devastation), "Help Apuan Alps", "Le cave uccidono il passato e il futuro" (The quarries are killing the past and the future), "Excavation devastation", and more.

In addition, the No Cav movement has at times supported other environmentalist initiatives and actions in defence of landforms not directly connected to the issue of the Apuan Alps.

== Affiliated entities ==
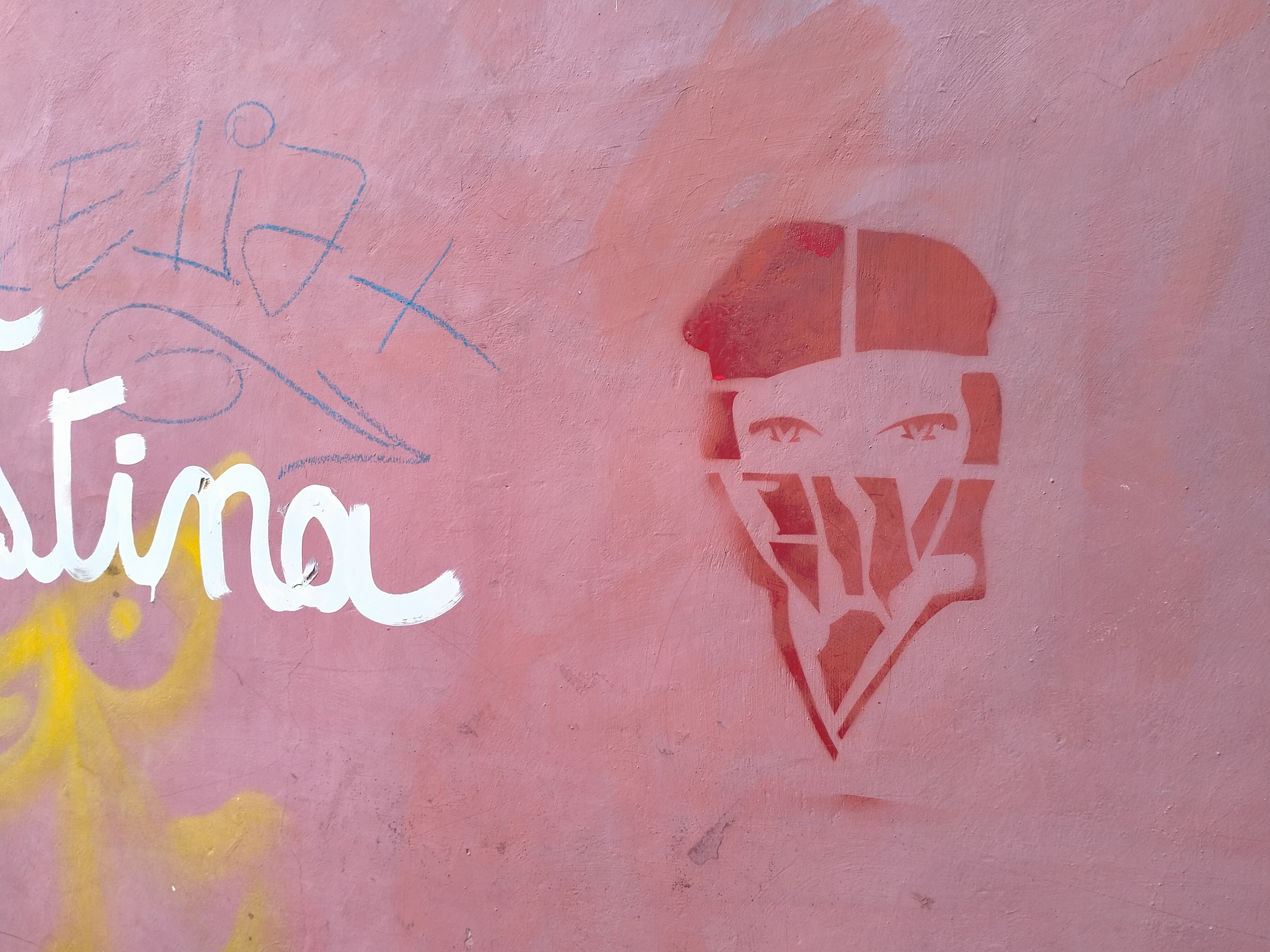
Athamanta (a No Cav group) logo on a wall in Carrara, 2021

Campaigns in opposition to quarrying activity in the Apuan Alps have been ongoing for years, pursued by many and varied groups:

- Environmentalist associations, for instance Legambiente, Gruppo d'Intervento Giuridico (these last engaging in legal interventions), WWF, Extinction Rebellion, Sea Shepherd, Friends of the Earth, Apuane Libere, and yet more.
- Caving and mountain climbing groups including Club Alpino Italiano (Italian Alpine Club), Mountain Wilderness, and Federazione Italiana Escursionismo (Italian Trekking Federation)
- Associations for land care, such as Italia Nostra (Our Italy) and Fondo Ambiente Italiano (Italian Enveronmental Foundation)
- Committees and movements like Salviamo le Apuane (Save the Apuan Alps), Rete dei Comitati per la Difesa del Territorio (Network of Committees in Defence of the Landscape), Assemblea Permanente Carrara (Carrara Permanent Assembly), and Fridays for Future
- Collectives and social hubs such as Athamanta (named in honour of the Athamanta Cortiana, a plant endemic to the Apuan range and at risk of extinction) and others
- Faith-inspired groups such as Accademia Apuana della Pace (Apuan Peace Academy)
- Socio-cultural associations such as ARCI (Italian Cultural and Recreational Association)
- Associations not directly connected to environmental or landscape issues, for example Slow Food and GIROS (Italian Group for Research on Wild Orchids).
- Private citizens not members of a particular group, but who support the cause by taking part in No Cav initiatives.

Various Italian intellectuals and personalities have stood up in defence of the Apuan Alps. Among them are: Andrea Camilleri, Moni Ovadia, Salvatore Settis, Adriano Prosperi, Paolo Maddalena, Tomaso Montanari, Roberta De Monticelli, Maurizio Maggiani, Mario Perrotta, Alberto Asor Rosa, Paolo Cognetti (who has declared himself to be "truly dismayed, beyond being angry, at the condition of the Apuans"), Enzo Fileno Carabba, Angelo Baracca, Vittorio Emiliani, Edoardo Salzano, Pancho Pardiv, Alessandro Gogna, Claudio Lombardi, Alberto Magnaghi, Andrea Lanfriv (a main speaker at the large No Cav protest of 2021), and Rossano Ercolini. The cartoonist Sergio Staino made a cartoon on the subject.

The No Cav campaign also finds supporters beyond Italian borders, especially in Germany. International personalities close to the No Cav positions include Vandana Shiva and Raúl Zibechi. On a political level, the inconvenient issue of closing down quarries has often been snubbed by parties, with some exceptions such as Partito della Rifondazione Comunista (Communist Refoundation Party), Potere al Popolo (Power to the People Party), and individual politicians, such as Pietro Ichino and Tommaso Fattori. Only in 2021 a party, Europa Verde (Green Europe), led by Eros Tetti, includes in its program the closure of the quarries falling within the Regional Natural Park of the Apuan Alps.

== History ==
=== Mining in the Apuan Alps ===
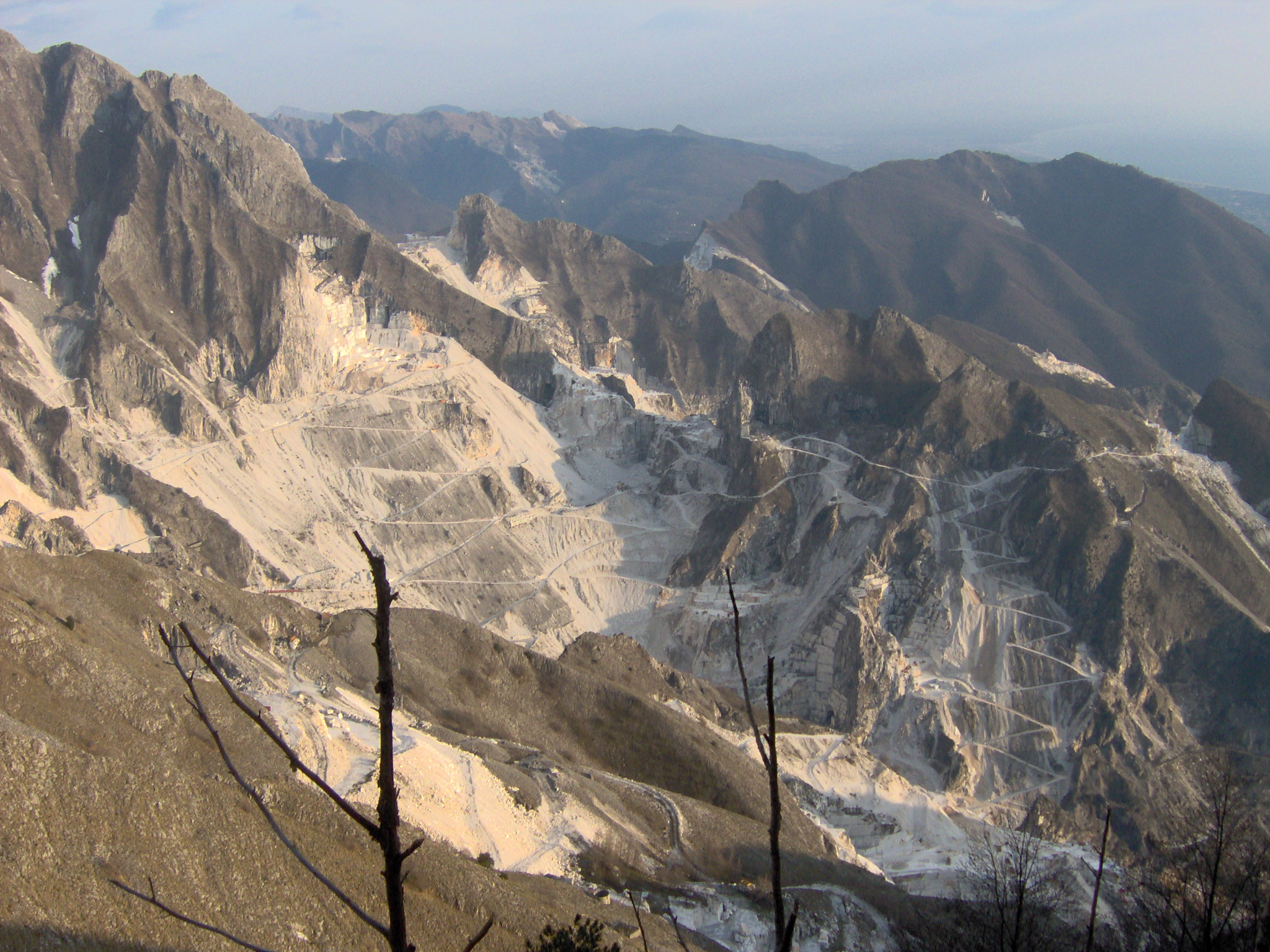
View of the marble quarries from Campocecina

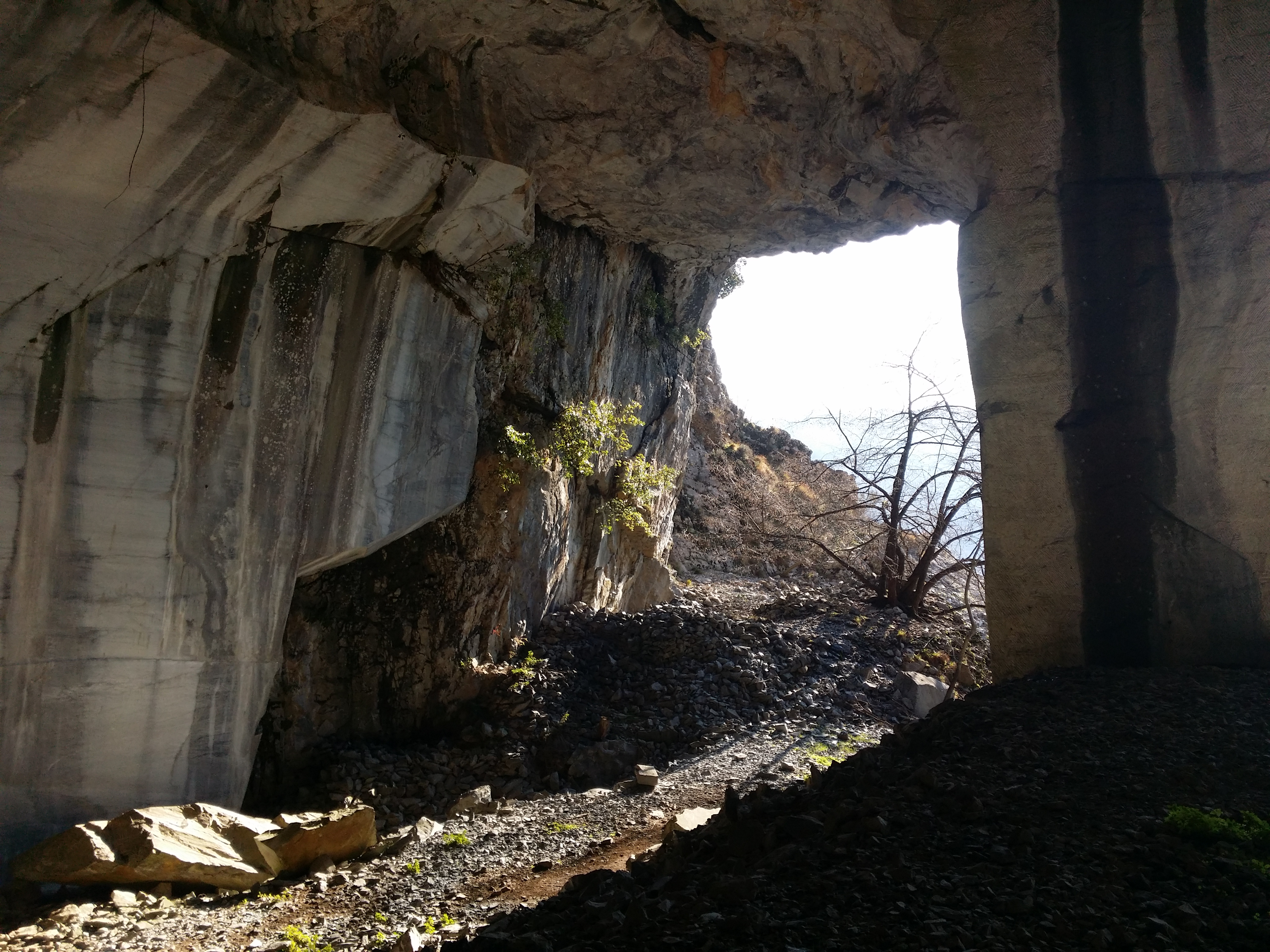
Marble quarry in Retignano, Stazzema

The Apuan Alps stone quarries were probably already used since the Iron Age by the Ligurians of Ameglia, but the actual mining activity developed from the Roman era, and experienced the greatest development under Julius Caesar (48–44 BC). Of the oldest quarries distributed in the Torano, Miseglia and Colonnata basins, not much remains, since the mining activity which continued over the centuries has caused their progressive destruction. In this way, ancient quarries such as that of Polvaccio and Mandria (Torano) and Canalgrande (Miseglia) have been lost. On the other hand, the quarries of La Tagliata (Miseglia) and Fossacava (Colonnata) are still intact, although poorly valued from a historical-archaeological and tourist point of view. Another quarry of certainly ancient origin is the so-called Cava Romana di Forno ("Forno Roman Quarry"), subject of a legal dispute for environmental violations and whose environmental licence was not renewed in 2017.

The peak of celebrity of Carrara marble occurred in the Renaissance as it was used by Michelangelo, who used to personally choose the blocks to work on.

Between the end of the eighteenth and nineteenth centuries there was a rapid increase in quarries, which began to be concentrated in the hands of a few large concessionaires, and the "industrialization" of mining, which attracted a large number of workers from the mountain communities, moving them from traditional agro-pastoral occupations to mining ones. The construction of the Carrara Private Marble Railway and the Port of Carrara dates back to this period. This process continued in the twentieth century, with the construction of infrastructures such as the Balzone cableway, in 1907 and the branch for Arni of the Versilia tramway, inaugurated in 1923.

In addition to those of marble, there were once also mines of manganese, mercury, iron, pyrite, magnesite, dolomite and yet more. In 2015 the case of severe thallium contamination of the aquifer, and consequently of the aqueduct, of Pietrasanta exploded due to the perite mines of Valdicastello, abandoned in the 1980s and never reclaimed.

In the post-war period, particularly in the late one, the mining activity has grown dramatically in terms of material removed, according to the magazine Focus "in the last 20 years, more than two thousand years of history have been excavated here". However, according to Corriere della Sera, the number of people directly employed in the quarries went from 16,000 in the 1950s to about 1,000 today.

=== Movements for the protection of the Apuan Alps ===
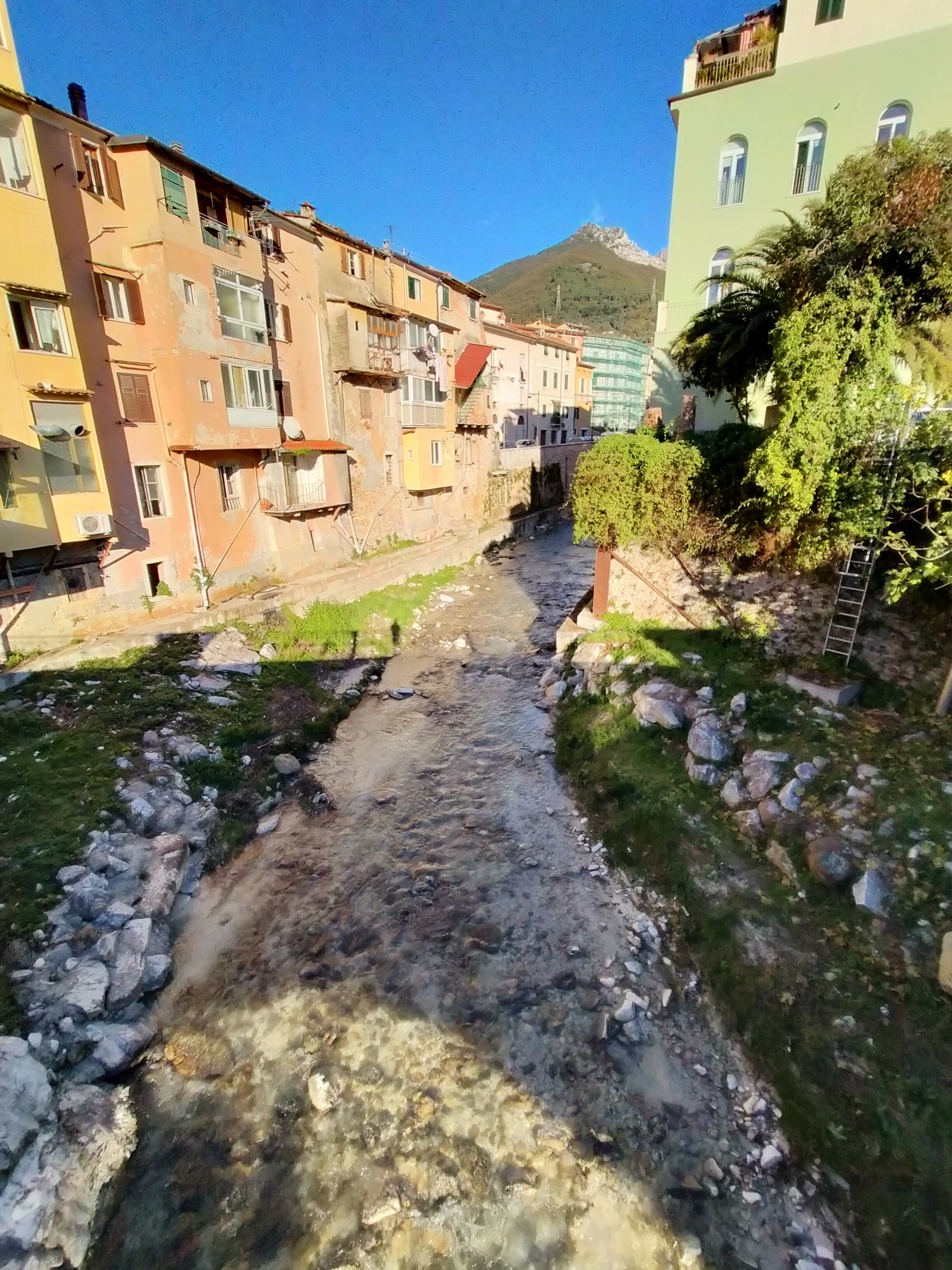
"Marmettola" (marble slurry) in the Carrione river, Carrara, 2021

In 1985, following a petition started many years before and the proposal of a popular initiative law in 1978, the Tuscan Region established the Regional Natural Park of the Apuan Alps. In 1997, with the Regional Law 65/1997, it was reduced the perimeter from about 54,000 hectares to the current 20,598 hectares, to protect the presence of marble quarries, reclassified as "area contigua" (contiguous area). Due to this reclassification, in 2021 the Council of State rejected the appeal of environmental associations against the reopening of quarries in these areas, unless they overlap with protection areas such as SCI, SRI or SPA.

Already in the 1980s, however, there were environmentalist struggles that led to the closure of the dolomite quarries in Forno (Massa) in the 1990s. At least since 2000 there have been appeals by environmentalist associations against the Apuan marble industry.

In 2000, through a national law still valid today, it was decreed the establishment of the Parco Archeominerario delle Alpi Apuane (Apuan Alps Archaeology and Mining Park) to protect the ancient mining activity historical evidences from the current one, but its actual establishment has been suspended since 2006, despite the favorable opinions of local authorities In order to overcome the delays, in 2003 the Regional Natural Park of the Apuan Alps established the "Sistema museale di archeologia mineraria delle Alpi Apuane" (Museum System of Mining Archaeology of the Apuan Alps).

From the experiences of struggle for the preservation of the Apuan Alps in the last decades of the 20th century, the current environmental conflict and the current No Cav movement would have developed. According to the Italian Atlas of Environmental Conflicts, part of the Environmental Justice Atlas, this "proactive conflict in favor of sustainable alternatives" would have originated in 2009, the year in which Salviamo le Apuane, founded by Eros Tetti, launched the first online mobilization, with a good response and a consequent growth and diffusion on the territory.

In 2010, this movement presented an articulated plan called "PIPSEAA" ("Piano Programma di Sviluppo Economico Alternativo per le Apuane", Plan-Program for Alternative Economic Development of the Apuan Alps) for a gradual economic transition of the territory that would allow it to get rid of marble without employment shocks.

In 2014, the Tuscan regional council approved a plan for the "gradual closure of quarries", promoted by regional councillor Anna Marson, and then withdrawn following pressure from Confindustria. For the first time, the newspaper Il Tirreno used the word "No Cav" to define the activists who fought against the Apuan quarries.

In the same year, following the umpteenth flood that hit the city of Carrara, the "Assemblea Permanente Carrara" (Carrara Permanent Assembly) was born. The activists occupied the town hall for two months. This group fights for the environmental protection of the Carrara territory and sometimes expressed very critical positions towards the quarries.

In 2015, Tommaso Fattori entered the Tuscan Regional Council with the list "Sì Toscana a Sinistra" (Yes Tuscany to the Left), contributing to keep up the pressure on marble quarries, also through the presentation of numerous amendments to regional laws.

In 2016, a group of associations called "Coordinamento Apuano" (Apuan Coordination) composed by: Legambiente, Salviamo le Apuane, WWF, Club Alpino Italiano, Fondo Ambiente Italiano, Italia Nostra, Rete dei comitati per la difesa del territorio, Società dei Territorialisti, Unione Italiana Sport Per tutti, Federparchi, Società Speleologica Toscana, Amici delle Alpi Apuane, signed a document entitled "Manifesto per le Alpi Apuane" (Apuan Alps Manifesto), in which they argued and detailed a green economic transition plan that would lead the Apuan territory to free itself from the marble supply chain, focusing on the defense of the environment and landscape, tourism and agroforestry productions. As a matter of fact, there are already valuable agricultural and gastronomic productions of the Apuan Alps, among which the wine production, in particular the Candia dei Colli Apuani, which could be promoted and strengthened.

The Europa Verde party led by Eros Tetti, which aims to close the quarries falling within the Regional Natural Park of the Apuan Alps, in 2020 proposed an abrogative referendum regarding the regional regulations more favorable to quarries.

In 2020, a petition was also started for the establishment of a national park including the Apuan Alps or to merge them with the already existing and contiguous National Park of the Tuscan-Emilian Apennines to ensure an increased protection of the mountain range. In the same year, the group Athamanta was born, which combines the experience of social centers to that of environmentalism. The first No Cav flags appeared.

In 2021 the Club Alpino Italiano proposed the establishment of a Cultural Park of the Apuan Alps.

Also in 2021, the association Apuane Libere was born. In July of the same year, the newborn association organized a big demonstration whose testimonial was Andrea Lanfri and in which 31 other associations participated. On that occasion there were scuffles at Passo Sella, where the demonstrators came into contact with a counter demonstration in support of the quarries organized by Confindustria.

In September 2021, the association Salviamo le Apuane presented to the United Nations Working Group on Business and Human Rights an extensive dossier on the Apuan situation, written with the help of the Wageningen University researcher Chiara Macchi.

At the beginning of 2022, the Council of State rejected the appeal of many marble companies against the new "Extraction Plan of the Region of Tuscany", stating that it is the right and duty of the region to protect the environment, especially of a "unicum" like the Apuan Alps, even by limiting the freedom of economic initiative.

== Arguments ==
=== Environmental pollution ===
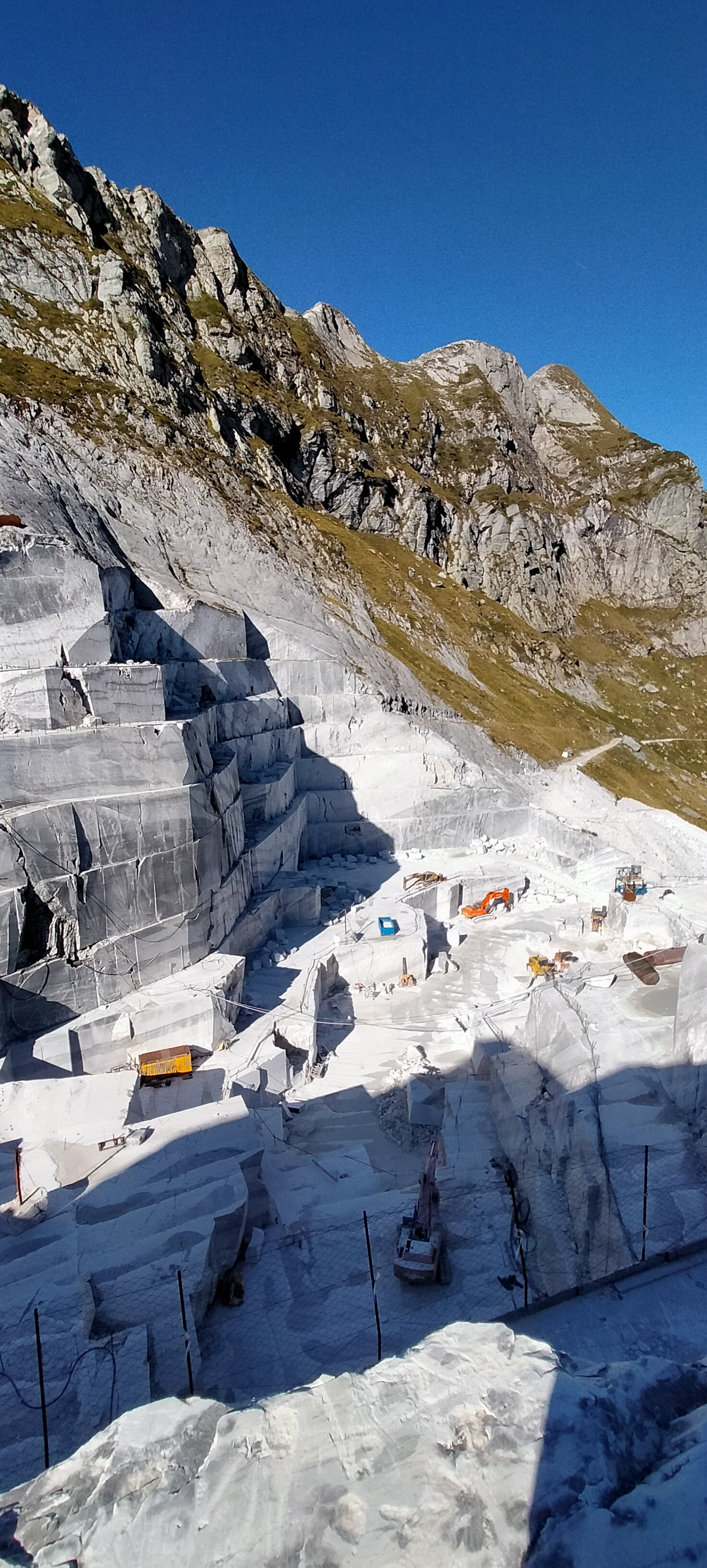
Marble quarry at Passo della Focolaccia (Apuan Alps), about 1600 m above the sea. The pass has been irreversibly modified

Extractive activity has a negative impact on aquifers due to pollution of soil and surface and groundwater, with both environmental and public health implications for the populations that are supplied with it.

Marmettola, marble dust mixed with oils and sludge from quarrying, should be disposed of as special waste, but is often not properly managed and ends up dispersed in large quantities, constituting a serious environmental pollution problem.

Due to the high mechanization and industrialization of the mining processes, other pollutants such as heavy metals and, especially, hydrocarbons are dispersed into the mountain environment and groundwater in considerable quantities.

Other relevant impacts are the dispersion of dust into the atmosphere, noise and the abandonment of waste at high altitudes.

Stone companies have also been accused by environmentalists of greenwashing.

=== Destruction of habitats and ecosystems ===
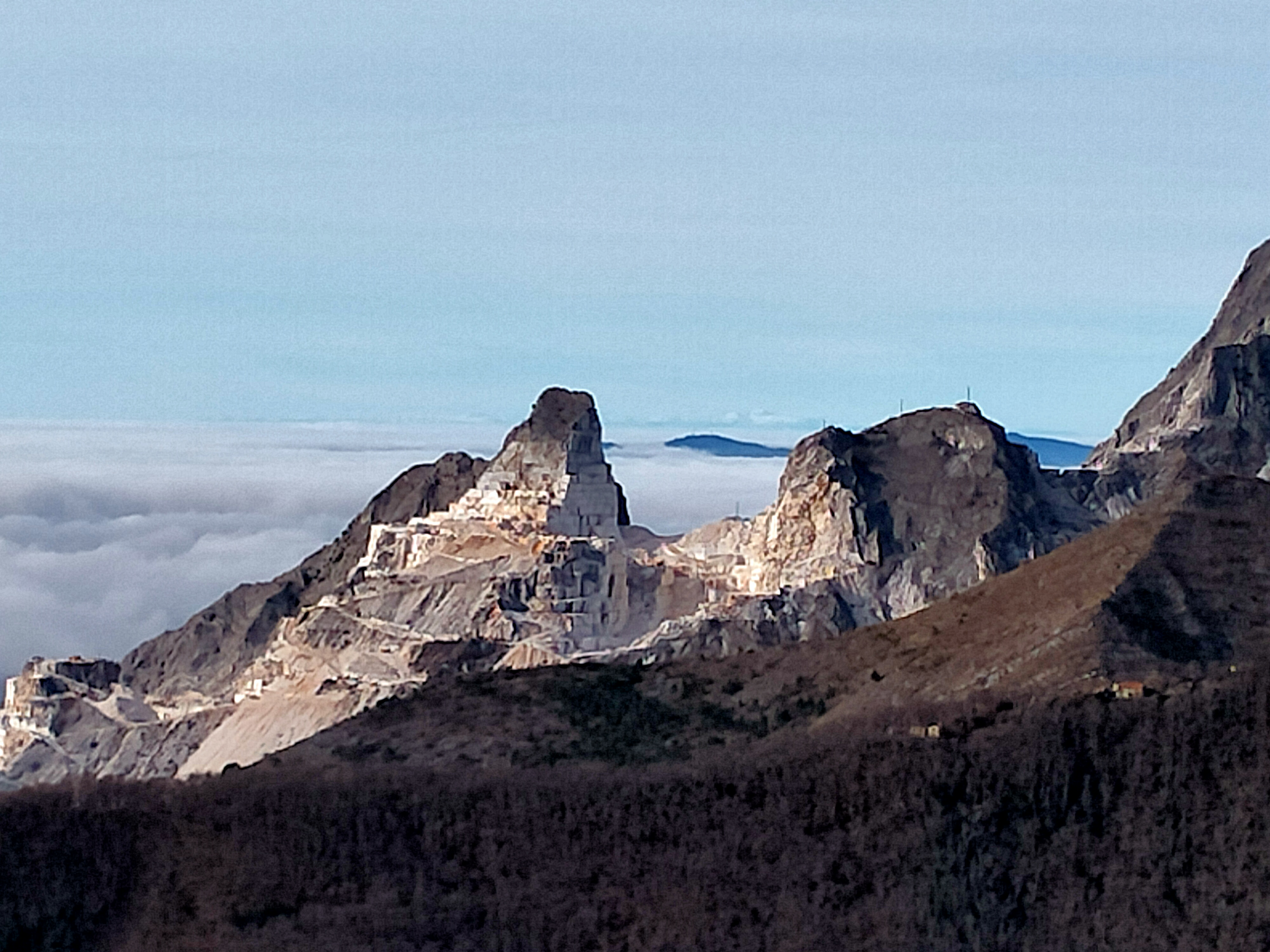
The devastating effect of Cava dei Campanili (Bell Towers Quarry), Colonnata, which nearly wiped out an entire mountain range

The Apuan quarries are a serious threat to the habitats and to the naturalistic heritage of the mountain range as they cause the destruction of the flora, the stripping of the soil and the profound modification of the environment and the original landscape.

These activities insist on an area of great natural value, high biodiversity and geodiversity, recognized as a regional natural park and UNESCO World Geopark. The Apuan Alps contain about 50% of Tuscan biodiversity, including some endemics. Rare and relict species are also present among the flora and fauna, including the rare alpine newt, threatened by the Valsora Quarry (area of herpetological relevance IT130TOS003 recognized by the Societas Herpetologica Italica) and the possible reopening of Crespina Quarry II, at the foot of Mt. Sagro, and endangered species like wolf and European wildcat.

The industrial activity of the quarries interferes directly or indirectly with a protected territory, which is part of the European network Natura 2000 and includes areas classified as Important Bird and Biodiversity Areas, Special Protection Areas, Special Areas of Conservation, Sites of Community Importance, WWF Oasis, LIPU Oasis and where there is an active project for the protection of the wolf in collaboration with the National Park of the Tuscan-Emilian Apennines.

The mining activities subtract water from the sources, while the marmettola (very fine marble dust), produced by them in large quantities, deposits on the bed of the watercourses, destroys microsystems and represents a serious risk for the existence of some animal species. Moreover, it penetrates into the karst network, modifying the quality of groundwater and favoring the presence of epigean species, which threaten the more fragile hypogean ones.

=== Hydrogeological instability and destruction of geosites ===
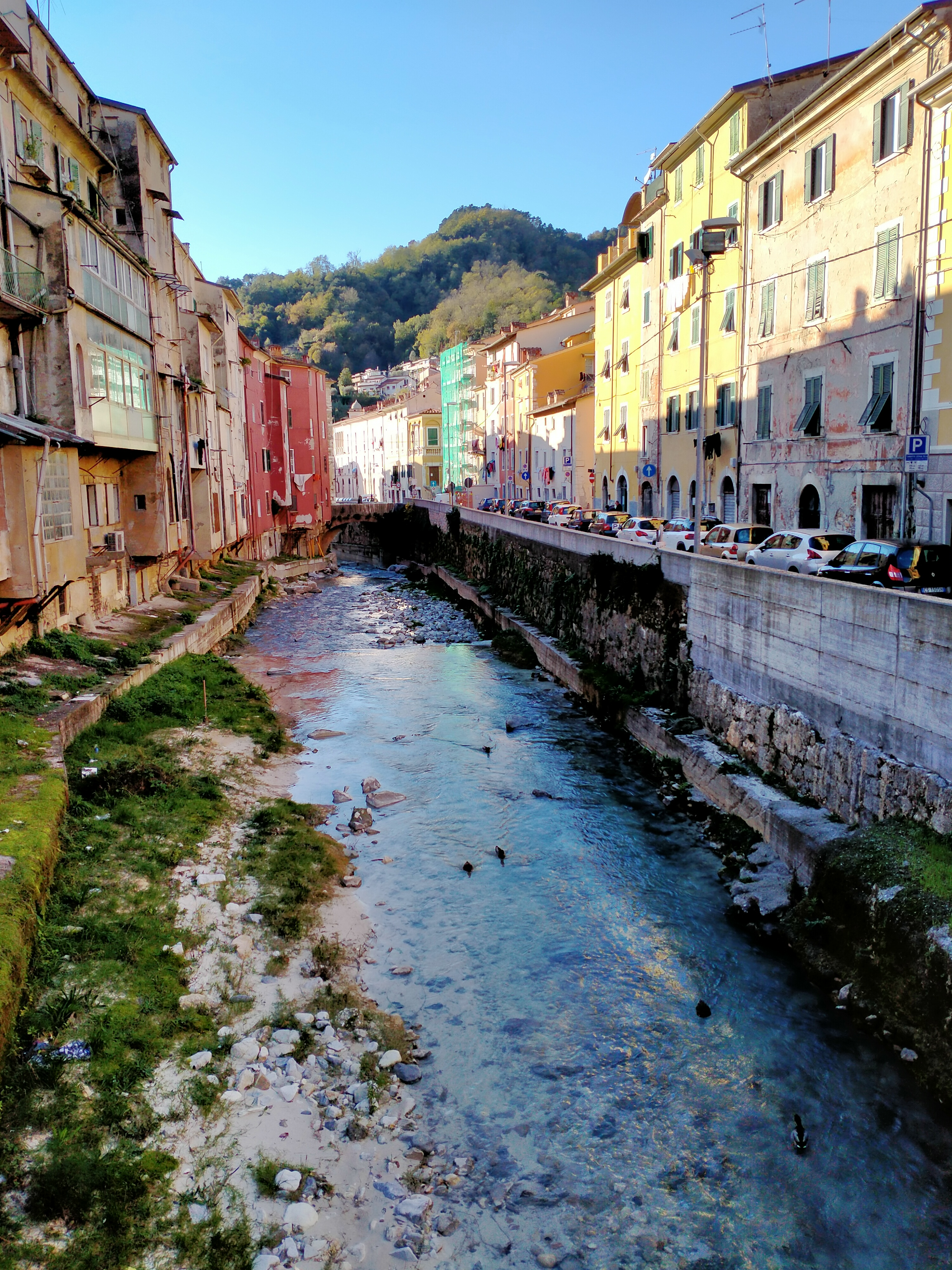
Carrione river in Carrara, polluted by "marmettola" (marble slurry), 2021

The Apuan Alps have been recognized as a UNESCO World Geopark. Therefore, quarries are also a serious threat to Apuan geodiversity and the karst activities present, which are particularly represented and significant in this mountain range. Numerous cavities fall within the quarry area, despite the fact that they are protected, and many times they have been intercepted and damaged by mining activities, or filled with debris. Even the Antro del Corchia, Italy's largest karstic cave and one of the most important caves in Europe, is said to have suffered damage from nearby quarries.

In the Apuan Alps there is also the largest water reserve in Tuscany, put at risk by the mining activity due to its direct use, to the discharge of debris, waste and marmettola, which occlude watercourses and springs and the modification of the karst network.

Moreover, the "marmettola" (marble slurry), besides being chemically contaminated by hydrocarbons and metals, is strongly polluting also by mechanical action: it fills the interstices and waterproofs the surfaces eliminating the habitats of many species, modifies the processes of groundwater supply, speeds up the surface flow of water, infiltrates the karst network modifying the paths of groundwater up to cause the drying up or the deterioration of the sources. The effect of quarries on local aquifer reserves results in significant economic and environmental damage to the Apuan territory, according to a study published in 2019 in the journal Water.

Finally, in terms of hydrogeological instability, "ravaneti" (mounds of debris), particularly recent ones, represent areas at high risk.

According to some commentators, the conspicuous removal of materials from mountains and the modification of their orography, would also play a role in the worsening of the local climate and the increase of extreme weather events.

=== Health risks to local people ===
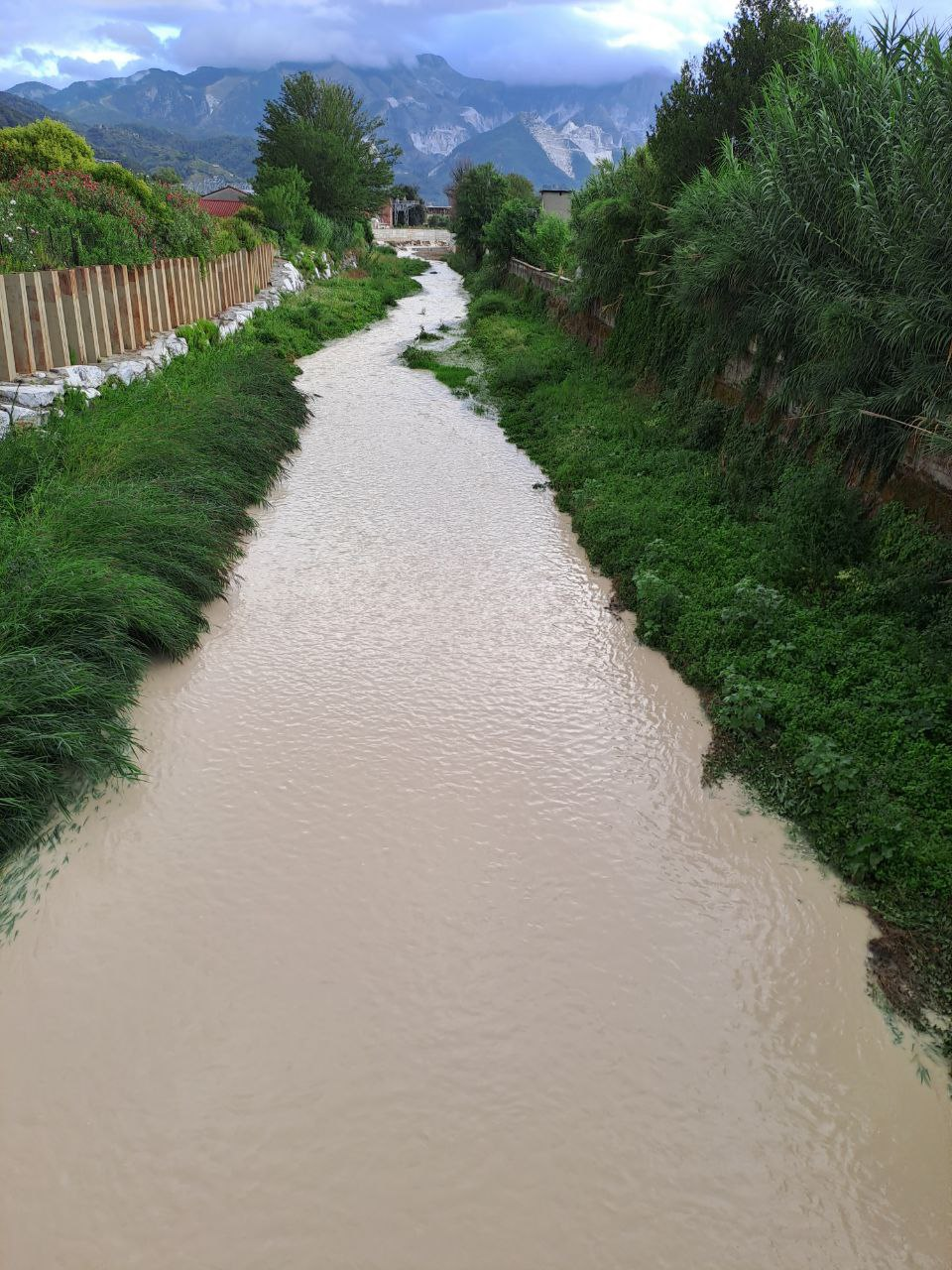
The Carrione stream invaded by marmettola, on 28 August 2023

The health of the people in the Apuan basin is threatened by the deterioration of the quality of drinking water due to pollution from marmettola, which is contaminated with dangerous chemical compounds such as hydrocarbons and heavy metals.

Another risk factor is the release of marble dust into the atmosphere, which, containing up to 5% silica, can cause pneumoconiosis, such as silicosis. Although trucks should be closed and/or loads kept wet to reduce dust dispersion, these requirements are often not met.

=== Landscape impact ===
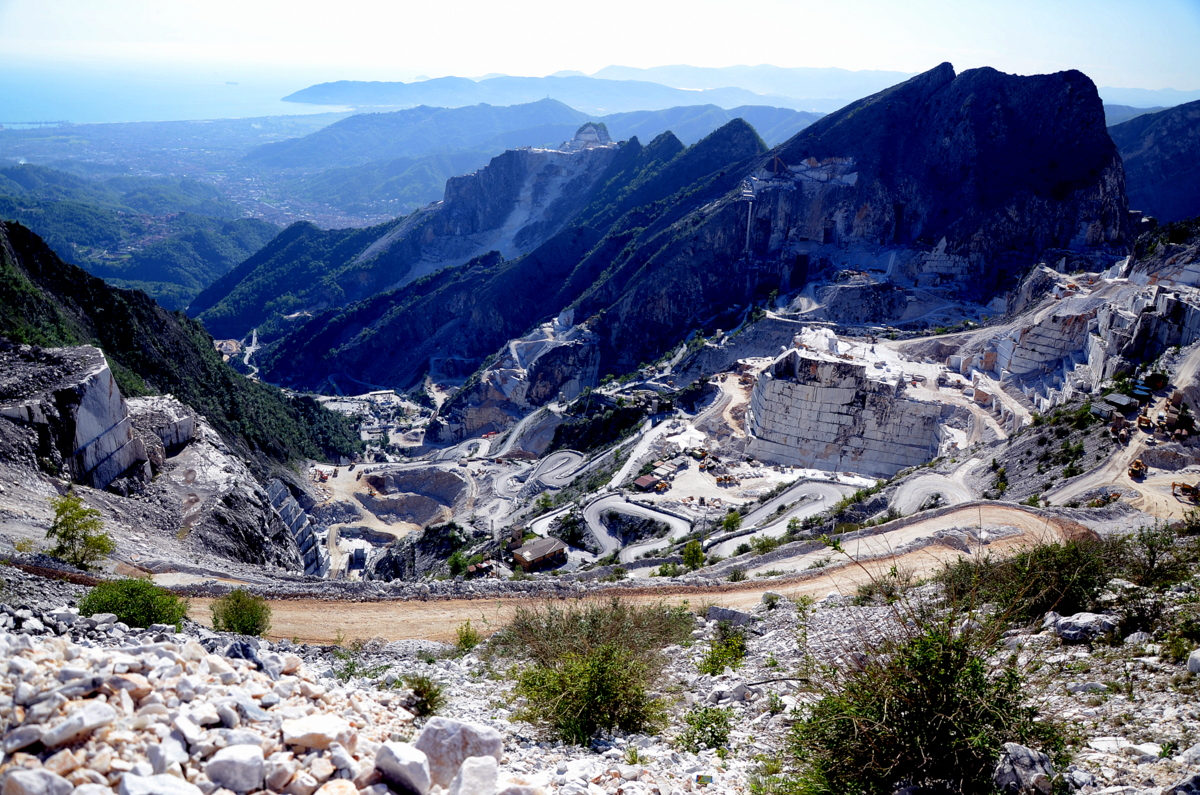
Panorama of the quarries near Carrara and the irreversible geomorphological changes they bring to the Apuan Alps

Quarries cause the irreversible modification with very high landscape impact on the geomorphology of the places, including some peaks and ridges, thanks to the exemption arranged by Tuscany Region. Such damages have also affected the profiles of some of the highest and most significant mountains in the range. The landscape impact is of such magnitude that it is visible in photographs taken by the European space mission Copernicus Sentinel-2 satellite.

Examples of these irreversible changes are the disappearance of the Falcovaia Peak, whose peak was entirely removed by the Cervaiole Quarry, the lowering of several tens of meters of the Focolaccia Pass by the Piastramarina Quarry, and the loss of the summit cusp of Carchio Mount.

The Tuscany Region, in derogation of the Italian Code of Cultural Heritage and Landscape that protects "the mountains for the part exceeding 1,600 meters above sea level for the Alpine chain and 1,200 meters above sea level for the Apennine chain and islands, glaciers and glacial cirques, parks and national or regional reserves, as well as the territories of external protection of parks" allows excavation even beyond 1,200 m above sea level and in the areas of the Regional Natural Park of the Apuan Alps. For this reason, in 2020 the Europa Verde party, which aims to close the quarries in the park and to repeal the regional exemptions, has raised the issue in the institutional office and has proposed a referendum to repeal these regional laws.

Because of environmental protection deemed insufficient, Il Fatto Quotidiano called the Parco naturale regionale delle Alpi Apuane a "joke regional park".

From a hiking, mountaineering and speleological point of view, the Apuan Alps have many trails, vie ferrate (the one on Mount Procinto, opened in 1893, is the oldest in Italy), climbing routes and karst cavities, whose existence is often threatened by quarrying activity, mountain huts and bivouac shelters. In addition, several stages of the Grand Italian Trail are located in the mountain range. There are also numerous ancient roads and paths including the Via Vandelli and the Via del Volto Santo.

Finally, in addition to the landscape damage due to the irreversible change of places, also the presence of machinery and industrial infrastructure of the quarries are a source of visual pollution of an area of high landscape value.

=== Destruction of historical and cultural heritage ===
The Apuan Alps are rich in historical, artistic, archaeological and cultural evidence, including some very ancient ones, being among the few regions in Italy where there are sure traces of Paleolithic civilization remaining. There are also historical evidences covering a time span from the early Iron Age, to the civilization of the Ligures Apuani, to Roman civilization, to the Middle Ages and to the modern and contemporary ages, some of them related to the marble mining activity itself. There are also testimonies of the Gothic Line, of the Italian resistance movement and of the Second World War, such as the Parco Nazionale della Pace di Sant'Anna di Stazzema (Peace National Park) in Sant'Anna di Stazzema, the Parco della Resistenza (Resistance Park) at Monte Brugiana and the Sentiero della Libertà (Freedom Trail) in Molazzana. In 2021 the Club Alpino Italiano also proposed the establishment of a Cultural Park of the Apuan Alps, including the house where Fosco Maraini spent his last years.

This cultural heritage is sometimes directly threatened by mining or poorly protected and enhanced because of it, as in the case of Cava di Fossacava, the largest quarry of Roman origin in Europe, whose management has attracted criticism from Italia Nostra and other associations. Another example is that of the historic Bivacco Aronte whose existence was threatened by the Piastramarina Quarry, and which was saved by the intervention of the Italian Ministry of Culture, which in 2021 declared it a "good of historical and artistic interest".

To protect the Apuan historical assets related to the ancient mining activity, in 2000 it was decreed the establishment of the "Parco Archeominerario delle Alpi Apuane" (Apuan Alps Archeo-mineral Park), whose actual establishment is however suspended since 2006, despite the favorable opinions of local authorities.

A stretch of the eighteenth-century Via Vandelli, despite being protected since 1976 (Ministerial Decree 128/76), has been destroyed by the mining activity of the Colubraia Formignacola quarry.

In 2017 it was requested the reopening of the quarries located near the Palazzo Mediceo di Serravezza (Serravezza Medici Palace), UNESCO World Heritage Site. Also thanks to the mobilization of citizens, the request was rejected.

=== Indirect negative impacts ===
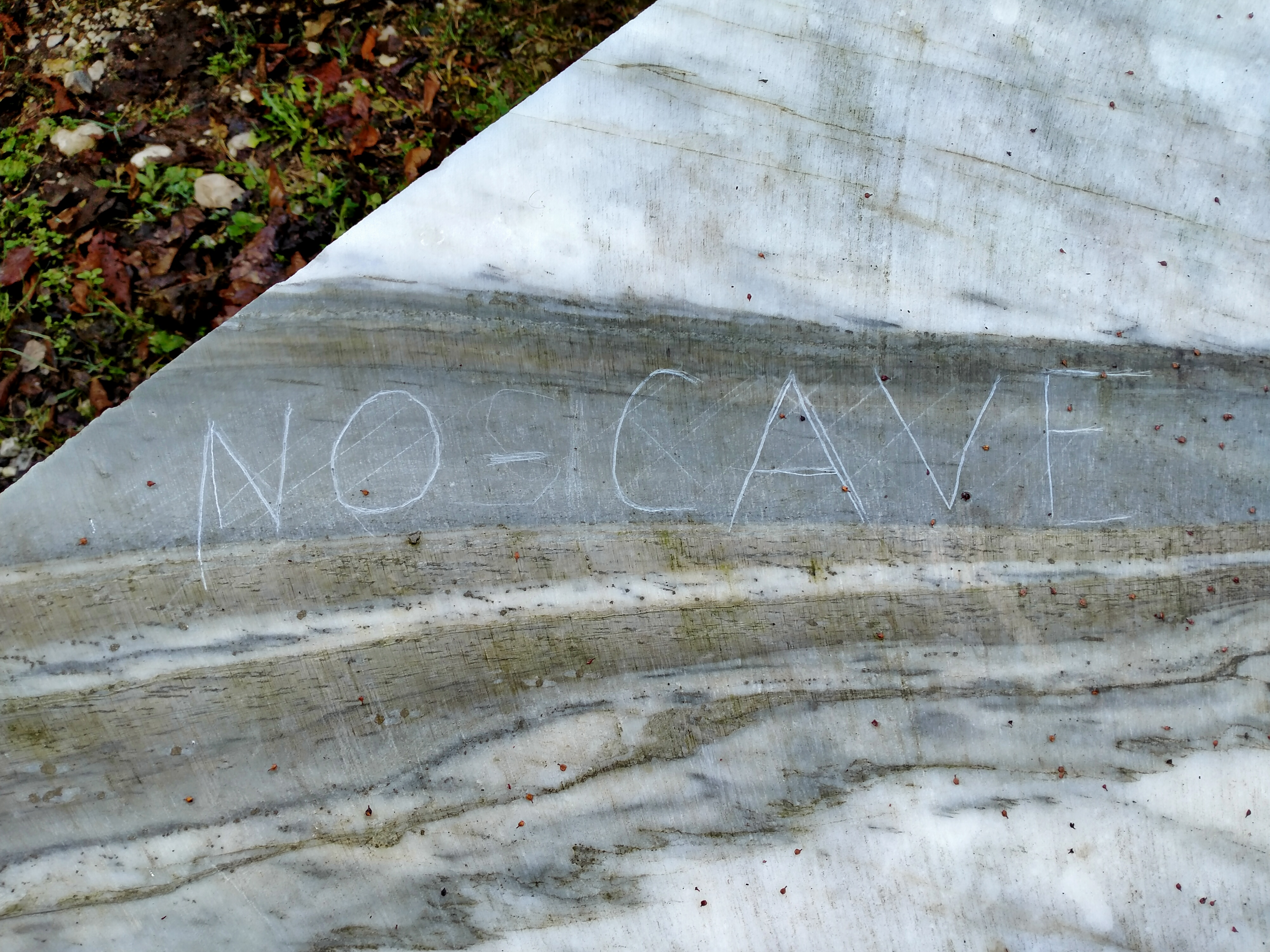
No Cav slogan on a marble block close to the Henraux quarry gate in Azzano (Seravezza)

High indirect negative impacts of the quarries that fall on the Apuan territory are those related to the intense road transport of the extracted material: road accidents (including the loss of truck loads), air pollution, noise, inconveniences related to traffic and the wear and tear of the roads themselves.

These indirect pollutants have an additional environmental impact and are the cause of the worsening quality of life in the Apuan area.

A particularly uncomfortable event was the several collapses in a street in Colonnata in 2018, due to a nearby quarry.

To facilitate the mining activity, the "Strada dei Marmi" (Marble Road) was built in 2012, reserved for truck traffic and closed to common traffic. The maintenance costs of the road, which is subject to high wear and tear, are borne by the community as the expected tolls have never been collected.

The No Cav movements also emphasize the "external costs" of the marble supply chain, i.e., all those costs that would fall indirectly on the community. According to a 2006 study, released by environmental associations, for every ton of marble extracted, the costs would amount to 56 euros for the company and 168 euros for the community. An example of such costs, are the substantial expenses incurred by the municipalities of Massa and Carrara for the maintenance of the aqueduct filters, damaged by the marmettola.

Also in 2012 a 5 km tunnel under Mount Tambura was planned, whose real usefulness has often been questioned, but that would allow to quarry a large amount of marble. The project, strongly opposed by several fronts, was not realized.

=== Low economic impact on the territory ===
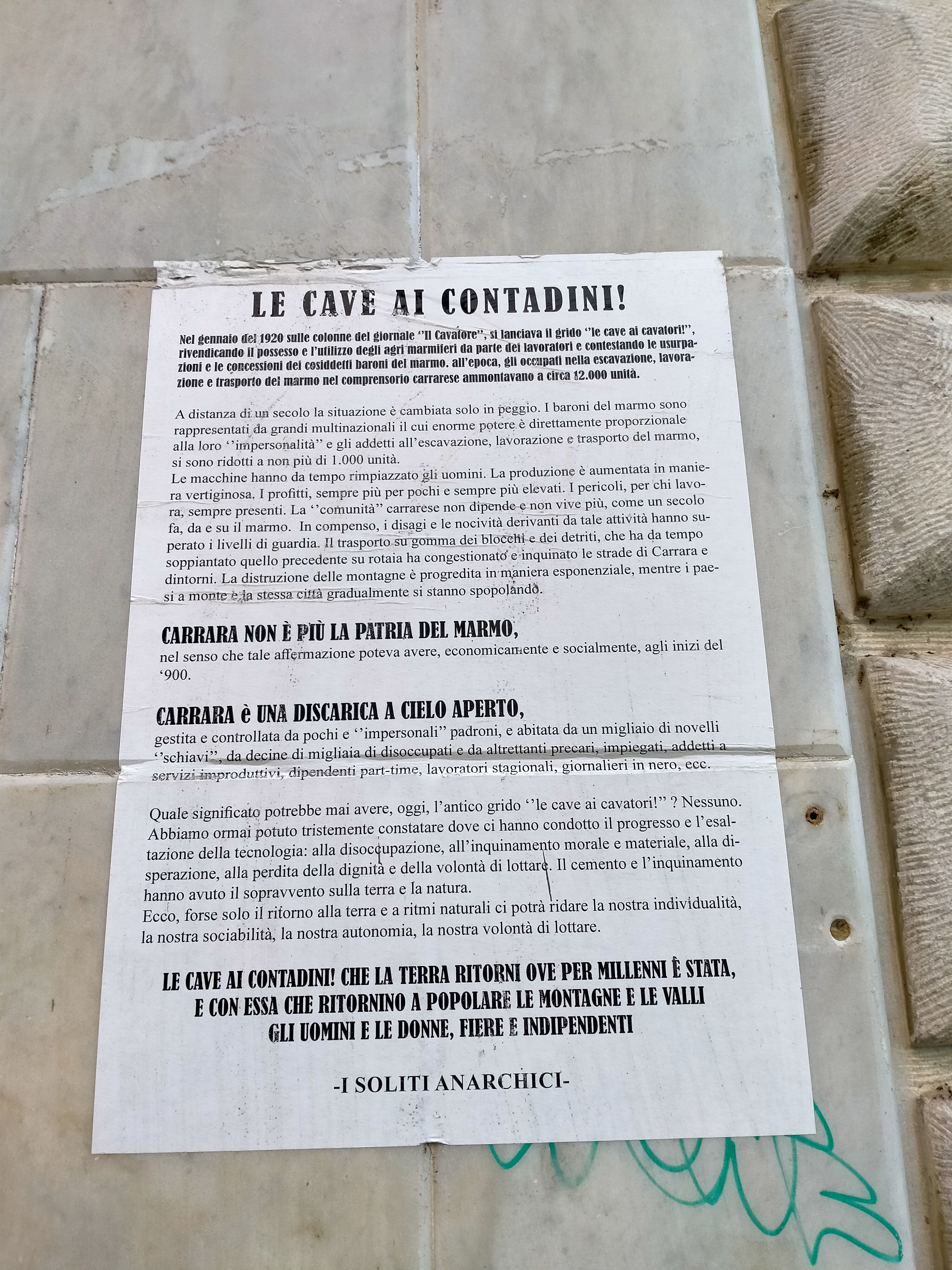
An anarchist "No Cav" declaration in Carrara, 2021

According to some observers, including Il Sole 24 Ore, the positive economic impact of the marble industry on the territory is it is getting smaller and smaller. Even on the employment front, the sector would be declining: according to Corriere della Sera, the number of direct employees in the quarries would have dropped from 16,000 in the 1950s to about 1,000 today.

Yet, while less than 100,000 tons of marble were mined annually in 1920, today it is up to 5 millions.

Moreover, most of the marble extracted in blocks is no longer worked in Carrara or in Italy, while the marble sector offers less and less work, poorly paid and moreover in safety conditions that have often been considered insufficient. Moreover, according to some national media, the public budget would have a minimal income from mining and sometimes not even the entire amount due would be paid.

In addition to these considerations, there are the "external costs" of marble processing, i.e., those indirect costs borne by the community, which would be approximately three times those incurred directly by mining companies.

Some observers have referred to the effects of the stone industry on the Apuan territory as an example of predatory capitalism, even going so far as to compare the local economic reality to that typical of colonies. Raúl Zibechi, for example, has spoken of the "harmony of the extractivist model with the colonial experience" stating that "in the economic sphere, extractivism has produced enclave economies similar to those induced in the colonies". The ownership of many quarries is in the hands of foreign multinationals, including the Bin Laden family.

The lack of attention for the territory and for the quarry workers themselves is a long-standing theme, if we think that even Charles Dickens, when he visited the quarries of Carrara in 1845, was struck by the backwardness of the production system, so much so that he accused the Duke of Modena, then lord of the city, of having abandoned it, as he reports in his book Pictures from Italy.

The presence of mining activity, by its nature non-renewable and considered unsustainable, is also considered a brake to any alternative and renewable economic development model, which enhances the tourism and agroforestry potential of the Apuan Alps.

The legal status of the ownership of many Apuan quarries is complex and originates from the concept of "beni estimati" and from an edict of Countess Maria Teresa Cybo Malaspina in 1751. Although in 1995 the Italian Constitutional Court had ordered that quarry concessions were always temporary, in October 2016 it partially upheld the appeal of some private companies, including Omya, against Regional Law 35/2015 that would have assimilated the quarries among the municipal unavailable assets, establishing that some (the "oldest" ones) were to be considered "private", others "public" and still others with variable shares of the two status, despite the appeal of numerous intellectuals against the alleged "privatization". The court also clarified that legislating on this subject is a state competence and not a regional one, so on 12 October 2021, the 5 Star Movement requested the scheduling of the parliamentary debate on the Tuscan Regional Law 35/2015, to incorporate the "beni estimati in the municipal properties.

The Cassation has also excluded in 2018 that the usucaption can be applied on the marble beds.

Some quarries located in the municipalities of Vagli Sotto and Stazzema (Arni) insist on civic use land, despite the fact that on them is prohibited the activity of excavation, according to the judgment no. 6132 of 21 September 2021 of the Court of Appeal of Rome.

=== Ephemeral use of the mineral: no longer art but industrial additives ===
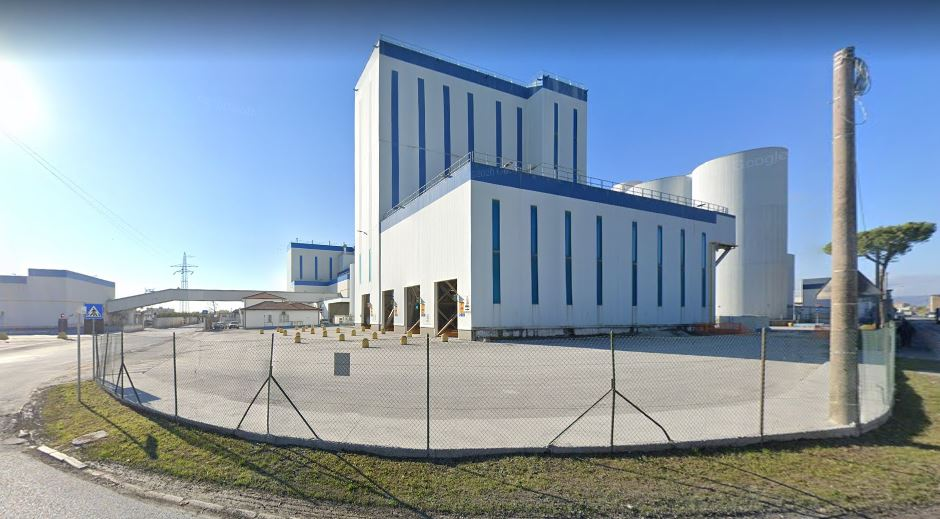
Omya plant in Carrara, Italy

The fact that on average about 75% of the extracted stone in the quarries is made up of flakes subsequently pulverized to produce calcium carbonate, processed by multinationals such as Omya and destined for industrial uses, while only 25% is stone mainly used in the building sector and that only 0.5% is still used in the field of art that has made Carrara marble famous, is another argument often used in favor of closing the quarries. In some, especially those in the Torano basin, debris percentages as high as 94% are reached, according to data from the Carrara public weighbridge. The problem of the very high quantity of waste produced by the Apuan quarries has been well known for a long time, so much so that an article in Scientific American in 1907 examined it. In order to try to mitigate this situation, Legambiente proposed, as observations to the Carrara "PABE" (a public quarries plan) presented in the last years, to limit the extraction activity to the areas with less fractured marble and to employ the low-altitude tunnel extraction, which would allow to quickly reach the little fractured mineral, instead of the surface excavation. However, this appeal went unheeded. In fact, according to the same industrialists, promising areas for the future of marble quarries would be sea fills, reefs, filters and fabrics.

In 2022, the Tuscany Region's new Quarry Plan imposed a minimum block or slab yield of 30 percent (reducible to 25 percent at the municipal level) on marketable material for obtaining a new permit. Industrialists filed a recall to the Regional Administrative Tribunal against this provision, losing it.

=== Alleged Mafia infiltration and widespread illegality ===
Piero Franco Angeloni, in his book Gli anni bui della Repubblica (The dark years of the Republic), claims that there was Mafia infiltration in the world of quarries in Carrara from the 1980s to 1992.

According to this reconstruction, in 1982 Raul Gardini let Cosa Nostra enter the "Calcestruzzi" company, leader of the Ferruzzi Group of his father-in-law Serafino Ferruzzi, through Antonino and Salvatore Buscemi, Totò Riina's men. To the management of the quarries Buscemi would have put his brother-in-law Girolamo Cimino. In 1987, Lorenzo Panzavolta, known as "il Panzer", Ferruzzi's partner, suggested the acquisition of Sam and Imeg (at that time part of Eni), which controlled most of the marble basins of Carrara. Moreover, bribes would have been given to some politicians to secure a series of public contracts in Sicily related to the desulphation and disposal of waste from the old Enel power plants, in which marble granules were used, and which Gardini won. The Mafia would have also managed the illegal traffic of waste, in particular through the so-called "poison ships" departing from the Port of Carrara and La Spezia. Following the murder of the entrepreneur Alessio Gozzani, the prosecutor Augusto Lama started investigations on Sicilian Mafia infiltration in Carrara, but the investigation was stopped by the then minister Claudio Martelli. The rooting of organized crime in the city is also testified by the murder of the engineer Alberto Dazzi through a car bomb in 1991. According to some hypotheses, some of the explosives used in the 1992 Mafia massacres would have come from the Apuan quarries.

Not only in that period of time, the Apuan quarries have actually been repeatedly investigated by the judiciary for alleged Mafia infiltration.

In 1994, the Lusa-Lanzoni bivouac on Monte Corchia was completely destroyed by fire a few days after the judiciary seized the nearby Cava dei Tavolini for environmental violations.

After several changes of hands, not very transparent according to the Carrara Permanent Assembly, in 2014 50% of the shares of Marmi Carrara (born from the ashes of Sam-Imeg) passed to Prince Bakr Bin Laden, of the Bin Laden family, who in 2017 was arrested for corruption in Saudi Arabia. At that time, a Carrara businessman who was his partner suffered a robbery with assault in his own villa, which, again according to the Carrara Permanent Assembly, may actually have been linked to a money laundering business.

The Permanent Assembly of Carrara also, in collaboration with the journalists Pier Paolo Santi and Francesco Sinatti raised suspicions about the alleged criminal management of waste connected to the Apuan quarries, in the years 2000 and 2010.

In addition, there have been numerous investigations for environmental crimes, health and safety, labour law, corruption and tax evasion, so much so that alleged "mafia systems" have sometimes been evoked, for example in the book "Terra Bianca" (White Land) by Giulio Milani.

The No Cav activists have suffered in the years of their militancy various threats, attacks and intimidation.

A sabotage to the vehicle of Sandro Manfredi exponent of the Assemblea Permanente Carrare and the Apuane Presidium of the Gruppo d'intervento giuridico occurred in 2018, fortunately without serious consequences, following which a solidarity demonstration was organized.

On 17 February 2021, the car of the president of the Regional Natural Park of the Apuan Alps, Alberto Putamorsi, caught fire in the night. In May 2020, the president's house had been raided as part of an investigation for corruption and rigged contracts known journalistically as "Sistema Vagli" (Vagli System) (named after the village of Vagli Sotto, at the center of the investigation) and which had also involved the seizure of Cava Prispoli. Suspicions for the fire were directed towards both the marble world and environmentalists.

The Mediterranean Observatory on organized crime and mafias, of the Caponnetto Foundation, in its 2020 report reports the presence in the province of Massa-Carrara of numerous organized crime groups.

=== Poor safety and numerous deaths at work ===
The extraction of stone in the basin of the Apuan Alps has always been a high-risk activity, which over the centuries has killed hundreds of lives. Beniamino Gemignani in his book "Il lavoro e i suoi martiri. Nelle cave apuane e di Garfagnana" (Work and its martyrs. In the Apuan and Garfagnana quarries, ISBN 9788871490588), lists the numerous fatal accidents from the time of the Duchy of Modena to the present day, some of which involved numerous workers at the same time. For example, in one in 1864 there were as many as eleven deaths. The increasing industrialization of the sector led to a decrease in fatal accidents, which nevertheless remained very numerous (22 deaths in 1965).

In the 2000s and 2010s the averaged was one injury every two days (1,258 between 2005 and 2015) and one death per year. As for quarries: one in 2006, one in 2007, one in 2010, one in 2012, two in 2015, four in 2016, none in 2017, two in 2018. In the supply chain, on the other hand, there were 1340 injuries and three fatal accidents between 2006 and 2018, for a total of as many as fifteen deaths in twelve years, with a peak between 2015 and 2016.

According to data collected by the local HSE Authority, between 2006 and 2015 there were an average of 102 accidents per year in Carrara's quarries; considering that there were 700–800 people employed at the mining sites, this means an incidence of one injured person for every seven workers. As reported by the Corriere della Sera, according to the Quarrymen's League these data could be downwardly biased due to occupational blackmail that would push workers not to report accidents.

As of 2006, non-fatal injuries were declining, but fatal injuries were unfortunately on the rise. However, since 2021, the year in which the Region of Tuscany discontinued its special program of quarry safety inspections, the number of non-fatal injuries also began to rise again.

== Aims and proposals ==
The positions of the various No Cav groups converge on the necessity of an environmental protection of the Apuan Alps, for example through the institution of a new national park or their unification to the already existing and contiguous National Park of the Appennino Tosco-Emiliano and, above all, on the aim of the closure of the marble quarries.

Most of the groups, such as Legambiente, Club Alpino Italiano, Salviamo le Apuane and others, aim at the gradual closure of the quarries, starting with those within the regional park of the Apuan Alps, without employment shocks, the inclusion of the Apuan Alps in a national park, and the abolition of regional exceptions for quarries. They also seek a mediation with industrialists and a dialogue with political forces and institutions.

For example, already in 2010 Salviamo le Apuane had promoted an articulated plan called "PIPSEAA" ("Piano Programma di Sviluppo Economico Alternativo per le Apuane", Plan-Program for Alternative Economic Development of the Apuan Alps) for a gradual economic transition of the territory that would allow it to get rid of marble without employment shocks. Then, in 2016, with a group of associations, they signed a document entitled "Manifesto per le Alpi Apuane" (Apuan Alps Manifesto), in which a green economic transition plan was detailed, to bring the Apuan territory to break free from the marble supply chain by focusing on tourism and agroforestry productions.

However, there are also more intransigent minority positions, which would like the rapid closure of all quarries, including those outside the Apuan Alps Regional Park.

== Media resonance ==
=== In Italy ===
Numerous articles denouncing the Apuan environmental situation have appeared in national newspapers and magazines, such as Il Corriere della Sera, La Repubblica, Il Fatto Quotidiano, Huffington Post, Internazionale, Il Messaggero, Il manifesto, Il Foglio, Libero, Adnkronos, Affari Italiani, VD News, Focus, Il Giornale dell'arte, Arte, Artribune, Arte Magazine, Finestre sull'arte, Altreconomia, GreenMe, Lifegate. Also RAI in 2014 and 2015 dealt with the "wild excavation of the Apuan Alps" in a TG1 report.

=== In the world ===
In terms of the international spread of the No cav cause, major foreign media such as Newsweek, Reader's Digest, The Guardian, Le Monde, Le Figaro, Deutsche Welle, Arte, Radiotelevisione svizzera and SwissInfo have also carried out investigations into the environmental damage of quarries. In 2012, an article by Der Spiegel attracted a lot of interest in Germany.

== Apuan disaster in mass culture ==
=== Film and TV ===
- Cosa c'è sotto le nuvole, a 2004 documentary film directed by Alberto Grossi presented in competition at the Trento Film Festival
- Aut Out, a 2010 documentary film directed by Alberto Grossi finalist at the Trento Film Festival
- Anthropocene: The Human Epoch, 2018 Canadian docufilm broadcast in cinemas around the world, where that of the Apuan Alps camp among the 43 largest contemporary environmental disasters, and which gave the No Cav cause global visibility.
- Cave Canem, 2019 documentary, directed by Alberto Grossi, about the impacts of excavation in the Apuan Alps.
- Carie, a 2020 documentary directed by Achille Mauri, Marzio Nardi, and Federico Ravassard (photography by Roberto Gianocca and Achille Mauri), which was also followed by an exhibition, a fanzine, and thematic debates, focused attention on the landscape impact of the Apuan quarries and on their potential reconversion with a tourist-sports perspective.

In 2021, the television channel Dmax Italia broadcast the program "Uomini di Pietra" (Rock Men), distributed by Discovery+, about the extraction of marble in the Apuan Alps, and in particular in the quarries of the company Henraux Spa, arousing criticism from the environmentalist world and the Club Alpino Italiano, as it was considered a commercial in favor of "destruction at the expense of nature". At the end of the year, the release of the second season sparked new criticism.

=== Books ===
- Elia Pegollo, Emozioni apuane. Non solo marmo, Res Edizioni, 2003, ISBN 9788889048009. Photographic book created by a historic No Cav activist to raise awareness of the environmental value of the Apuan Alps.
- Giulio Milani, La terra bianca. Marmo, chimica e altri disastri, Laterza, 2015, ISBN 9788858119754. Concerning the environmental impacts of quarries and other industrial activities in Carrara and their alleged illicit management.
- Piero Franco Angeloni, Gli anni bui della Repubblica. Aneddoti di vita professionale, Booksprint, 2016, ISBN 9788824900829. Concerning an alleged infiltration of Cosa Nostra in the Apuan territory between the 80s and 1992, retracing the investigations started at the beginning of the 90s by judge Augusto Lama, on which the author himself collaborated.
- Beniamino Gemignani, Work and its Martyrs. In the Apuan and Garfagnana quarries, Editrice Apuana, 2017, ISBN 9788871490588. Documented collection of fatal accidents at work that occurred in the Apuan quarries from the time of the Duchy of Modena to the present day.
- Gianluca Briccolani, L'altezza della libertà. Viaggio tra l'essenziale bellezza delle Alpi Apuane, Polistampa, 2018, ISBN 9788859618997. Text and photography autobiography narrative focusing on the author's lone crossing of the Apuan Alps and containing numerous observations and extensive reflections on the strong landscape and environmental impact of the Apuan quarries.

=== Art ===
- Cave Hominem, a 2012 art project by photographer Raffaella Castagnoli, focusing on the anthropic impact on the Apuan Alps, published in the magazine LensCulture.
- Apuan Carbonate, a 2015 art project by photographer Andrea Foligni, focusing on the disappearance of the Apuan Alps transformed into calcium carbonate dust for consumer goods. It was one of the finalists in the LensCulture Exposure Awards.
- Whiter, a 2017 art project by photographer Andrea Foligni, about "marmettola" (marble slurry) pollution in Apuan waterways. It was a finalist at the Sony World Photography Awards, Contemporary Issues section, and was exhibited in London.
- White Gold, a 2018 series of pictures by Luca Locatelli, winner of the Sony World Photography Award. These shots were published by the New York Times to accompany an article on Carrara marble which, although it did not directly address the environmental and landscape impact of quarrying, highlighted the massive global spread of Carrara marble for construction and no longer artistic uses.
- Alpi Apuane, photographic project by Primož Bizjak produced starting in 2014 and exhibited in 2018 at C.A.P. (Centro Arti Plastiche, Plastic Arts Center) in Carrara, concerning the anthropogenic nature of the Apuan quarries.
- Wolf Mountain, picture by Lorenzo Shoubridge (an artist who has spoken out against quarries in various interviews) depicting wolves at night near Mount Corchia and winner of the Wildlife Photographer of the Year in 2020.
- E se fossimo noi le Alpi Apuane? (What if we were the Apuan Alps?) Narrative and visual project by Garfagnana Dream, illustrated by Naomi Zanardo.

== Criticism to the No Cav movement ==
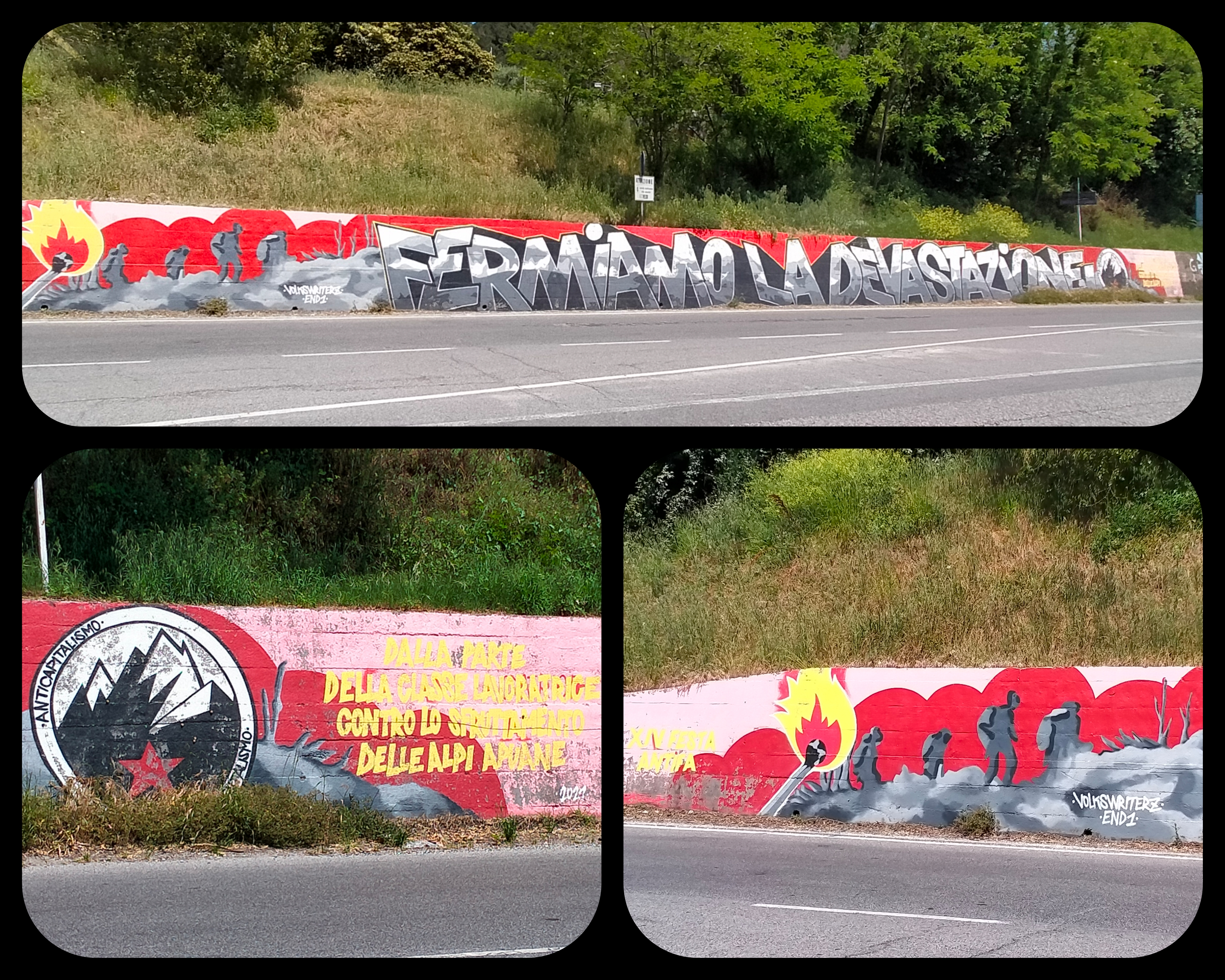
Anticapitalist No Cav Mural on State Road SS1 (Aurelia) near Montignoso

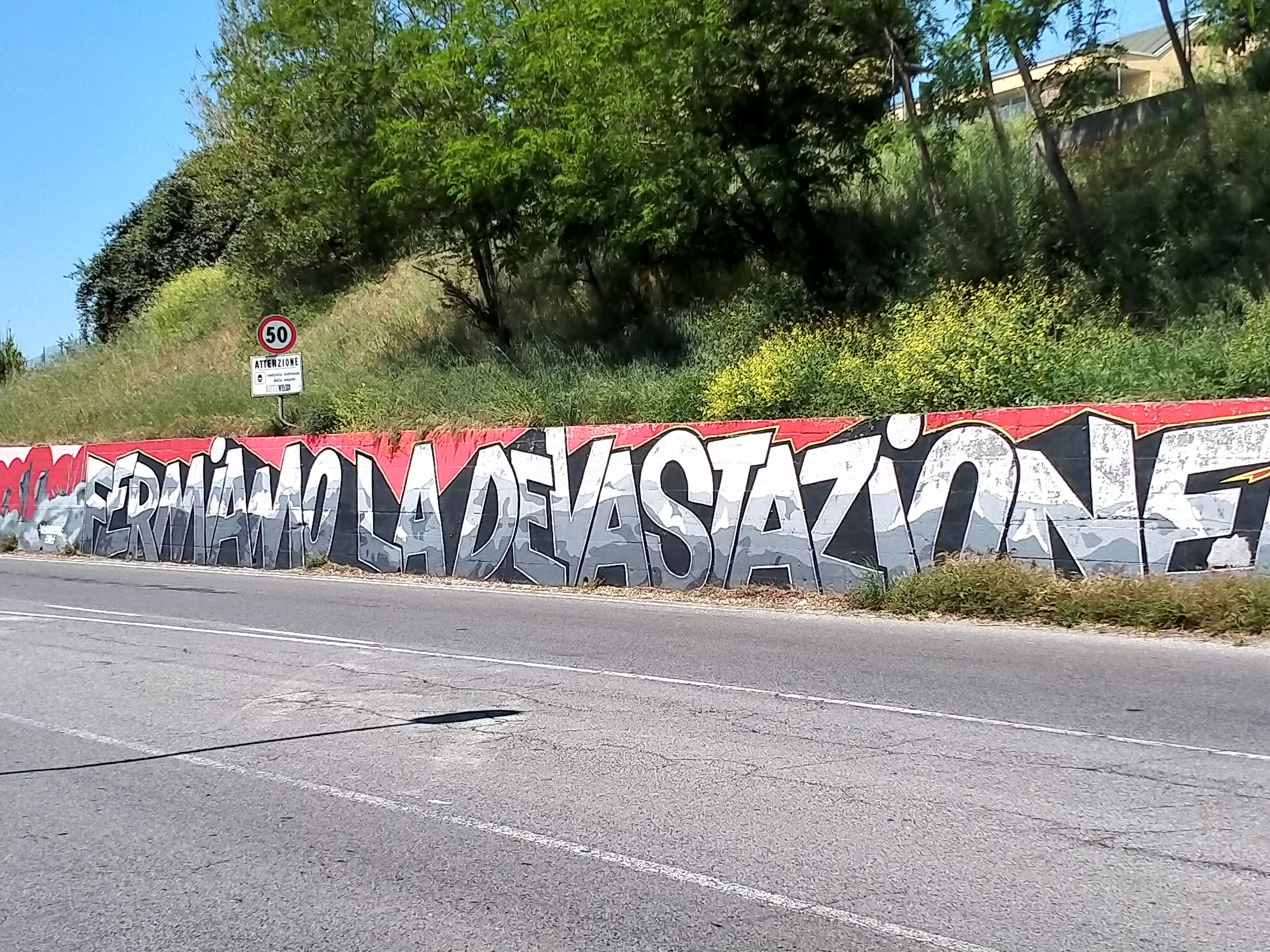
Detail of Montignoso mural

Confindustria, some quarrymen's unions, some political parties and local administrators and pro-quarry people have often criticised the No Cav movement.

Among these, the most common are the criticisms that quarries generate wealth and jobs that would disappear if the No Cav goals were achieved. The latter have responded by presenting detailed economic reconversion plans, aimed at maintaining if not increasing employment and wealth in the area. Moreover, they have often contested the data presented by the industrialists accusing them of carrying out "job blackmail" and of constructing a "false environment-employment conflict".

Another criticism levelled at the movement is that it spreads false or biased information. No Cav has responded to this observation by presenting detailed and substantial dossiers, often drawn up in collaboration with experts, such as Legambiente's Quarry Report.

Quarry supporters also believe that No Cav would not respect the tradition and identity of the Apuan territory, which has always been dedicated to marble extraction. The No Cav supporters reply to this criticism by pointing out that traditional marble quarrying disappeared decades ago in favour of today's much more devastating industrial quarrying, which has nothing to do with the historical identity of the Apuan Alps.

In 2018, following the diffusion of an email exchange between the historical activist Franca Leverotti (member of Gruppo d'intervento giuridico and at the time president of Italia Nostra) and some public bodies, a marble industrialist sued her for slander and defamation, but the court dismissed the proceedings, claiming that what she reported was true. Following the same report, a second complaint against her was made by the municipality of Vagli Sotto, this time for damage to its image, with a request for compensation of 5.5 million euros. Solidarity towards it was expressed by No Cav protesters in front of the court. In 2022, at the end of a lengthy trial, the Civil Court of Massa ruled that the claim was unfounded, instead condemning former mayor Mario Puglia and the Municipality of Vagli Sotto to pay €6,700,000 each in court costs.

The movement was then accused of creating a climate of hatred towards quarrymen and mining activities and of not wanting dialogue with the opposing side, sometimes having aggressive attitudes. The No Cav people have rejected these accusations stating that the exact opposite would be true. In 2021 the movement Salviamo le Apuane, proposed a hypothesis of mediation and solution of the environmental conflict of the Apuan Alps, immediately picked up by the Europa Verde party.

At times, the movement has also been accused of alleged sabotage and ecoterrorist attacks, insults, threats and other crimes.

On 17 February 2021, the car of the president of the Regional Natural Park of the Apuan Alps, Alberto Putamorsi, caught fire in the night. In May 2020, the president's house had been raided as part of an investigation for corruption and rigged contracts known journalistically as "Sistema Vagli" (Vagli System) (named after the village of Vagli Sotto, at the center of the investigation) and which had also involved the seizure of Cava Prispoli. Suspicions for the fire were directed towards both the marble world and environmentalists.

In August 2021, there was an alleged attack on a quarry in Gorfigliano, with some mechanical equipment set on fire during the night; an act from which environmentalists actually distanced themselves and which is currently under investigation.

Accusations of violent or illegal actions have always been rejected by No Cav, who have instead expressed solidarity with the victims.
