= Monte Pisanino =

Mountain in Italy

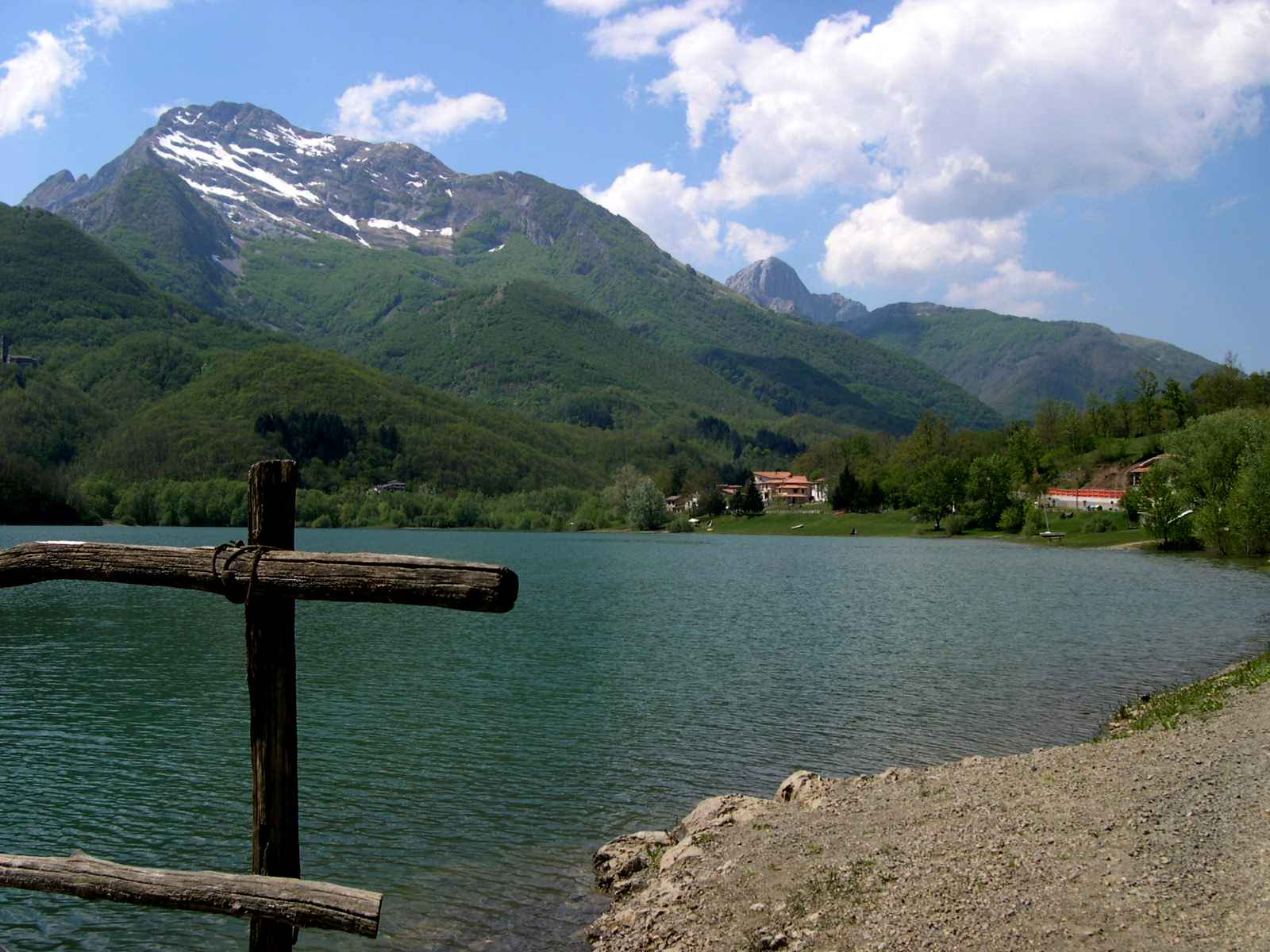
- Monte Pisanino seen from the Lake Gramolazzo.

Highest point
- Elevation: 1,946 m (6,385 ft)
- Prominence: 1,167 m (3,829 ft)
- Listing: Ribu
- Coordinates: 44°08′01″N 10°12′52″E

Geography
- Location within Italy
- Location: Tuscany, Italy
- Parent range: Alpi Apuane

Monte Pisanino is the highest peak (1,946 m) in the Alpi Apuane, in Tuscany, central Italy. Located in the comune of Minucciano (province of Lucca), it is also the highest mountain entirely belonging to the Tuscany region.

== Name ==
According to the legend, it takes its name from a Pisan soldier who took refuge here. Locally it is called Pizzo della Caranca.
