= Monte Tambura =

Mountain in Italy

Coordinates: 44.1072°N 10.2282°E

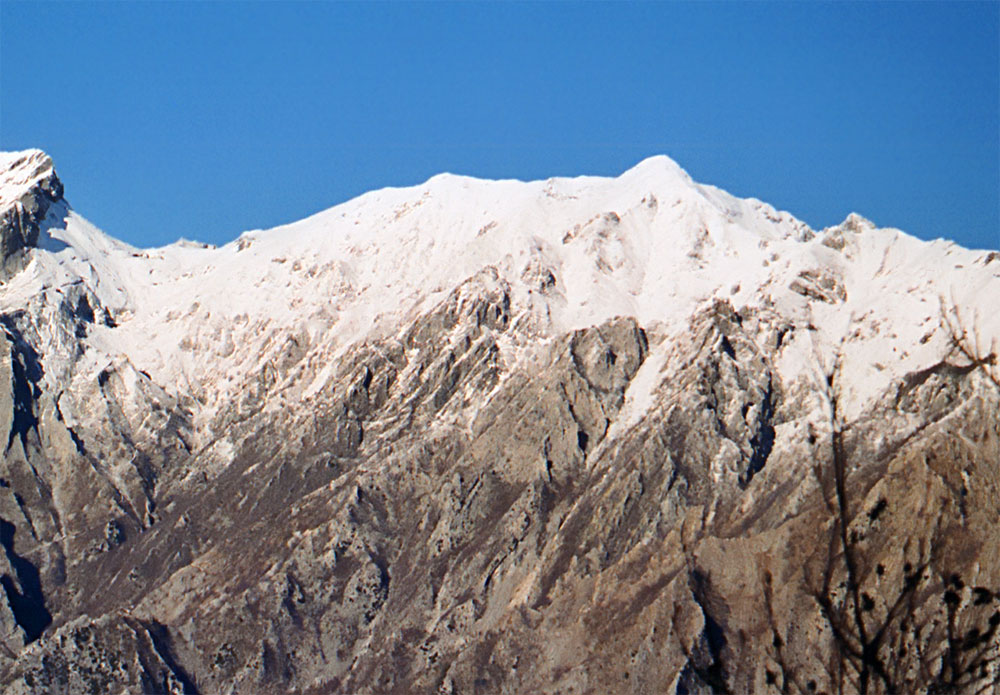

Highest point
- Elevation: 1,891 m (6,204 ft)
- Prominence: 251 m (823 ft)

Geography
- Location: Tuscany, Italy
- Parent range: Alpi Apuane

Monte Tambura is a mountain (1,891 m) in the Alpi Apuane, in Tuscany, central Italy. It is the second highest peak in the chain after Monte Pisanino. Located on the boundary between the province of Lucca and the province of Massa-Carrara, the Tambura is part of the Natural Regional Park of the Alpi Apuane.
