= Apuan Alps =

Mountain range in northern Tuscany, Italy

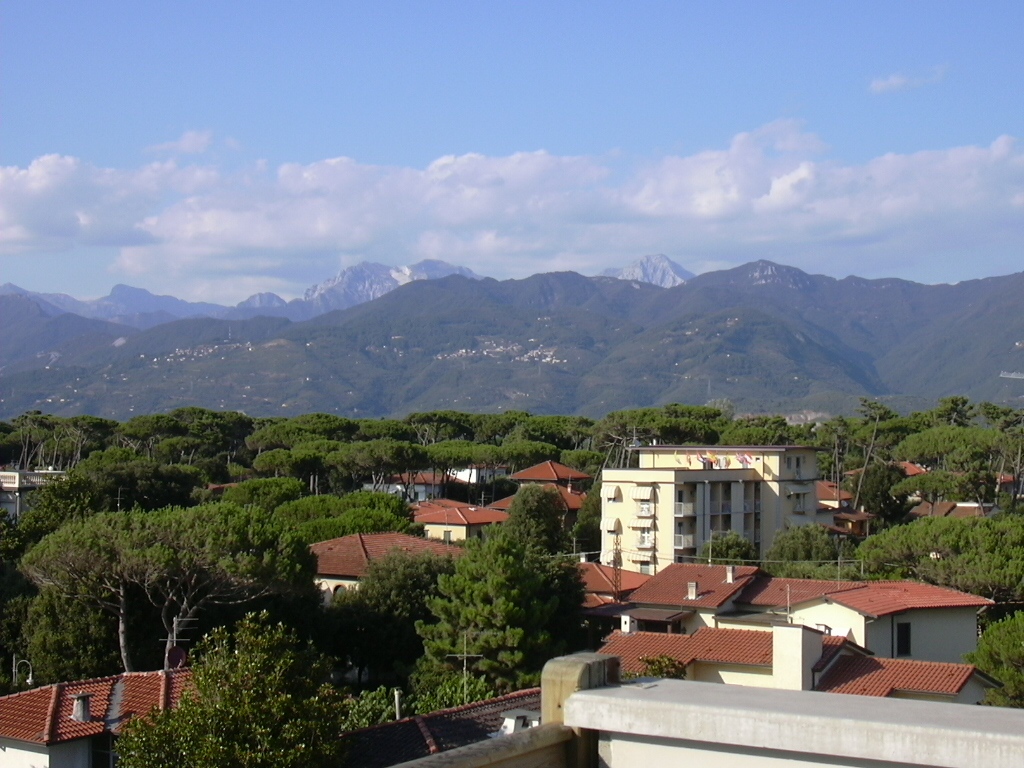
- Apuan Alps seen from Pietrasanta

Highest point
- Peak: Monte Pisanino
- Elevation: 1,946 m (6,385 ft)
- Coordinates: 44°08′01″N 10°12′52″E

Geography
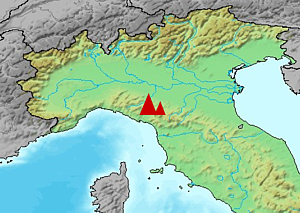
- Location of the Apuan Alps in Italy
- Country: Italy
- Region: Tuscany
- Parent range: Apennine Mountains

Geology
- Rock age: Triassic

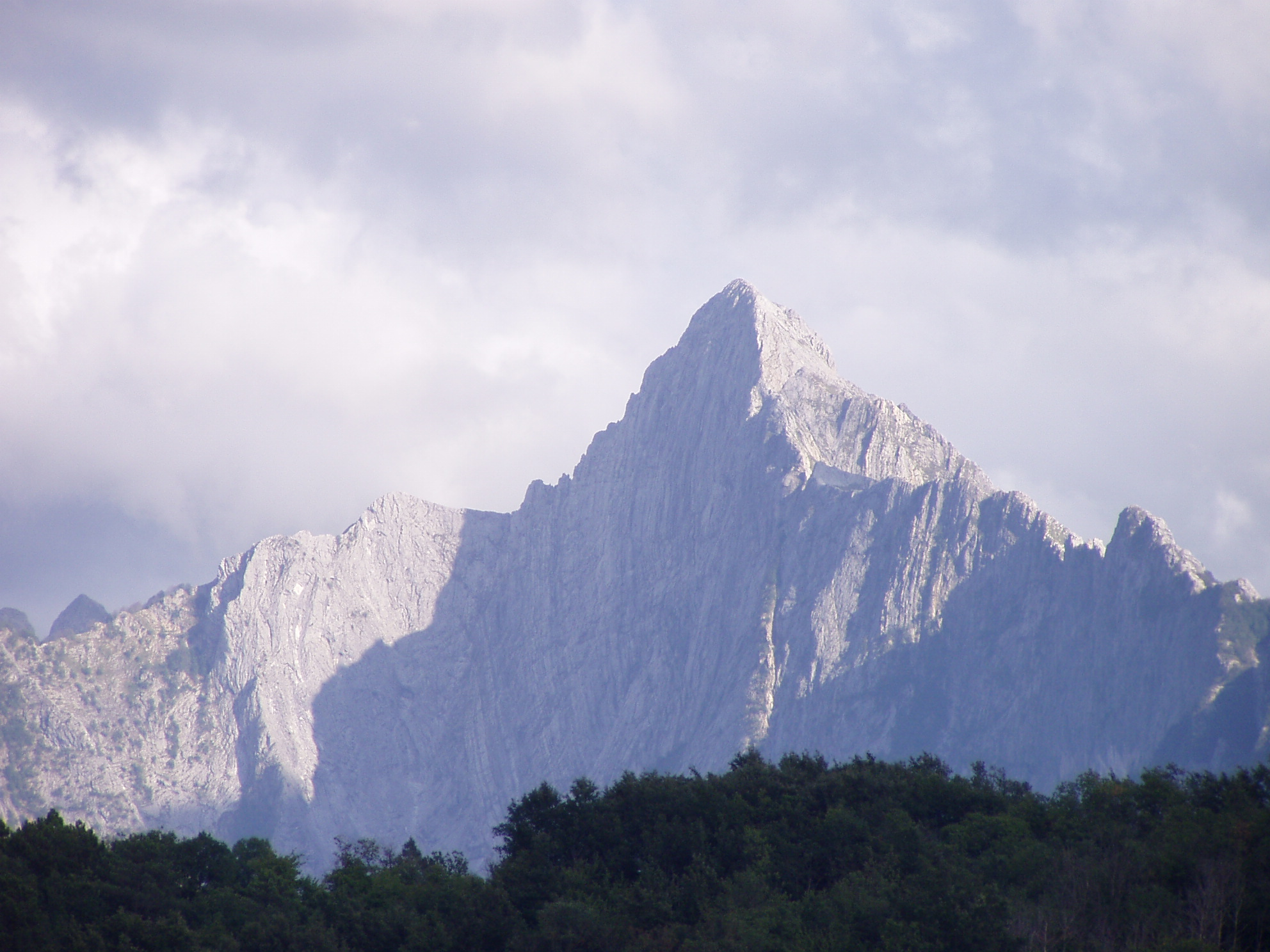
Northern view of the Pizzo d'Uccello

The Apuan Alps (Italian: Alpi Apuane) are a mountain range in northern Tuscany, Italy. They are included between the valleys of the Serchio and Magra rivers, and, to the northwest, the Garfagnana and Lunigiana, with a total length of approximately 55 kilometres (34 mi).

The name derives from the Apuani Ligures tribe that lived there in ancient times.

The mountain range is known for its Carrara marble. Due to the high environmental impact of marble quarrying, the No Cav movement strongly opposes this activity.

== Geology and geography ==
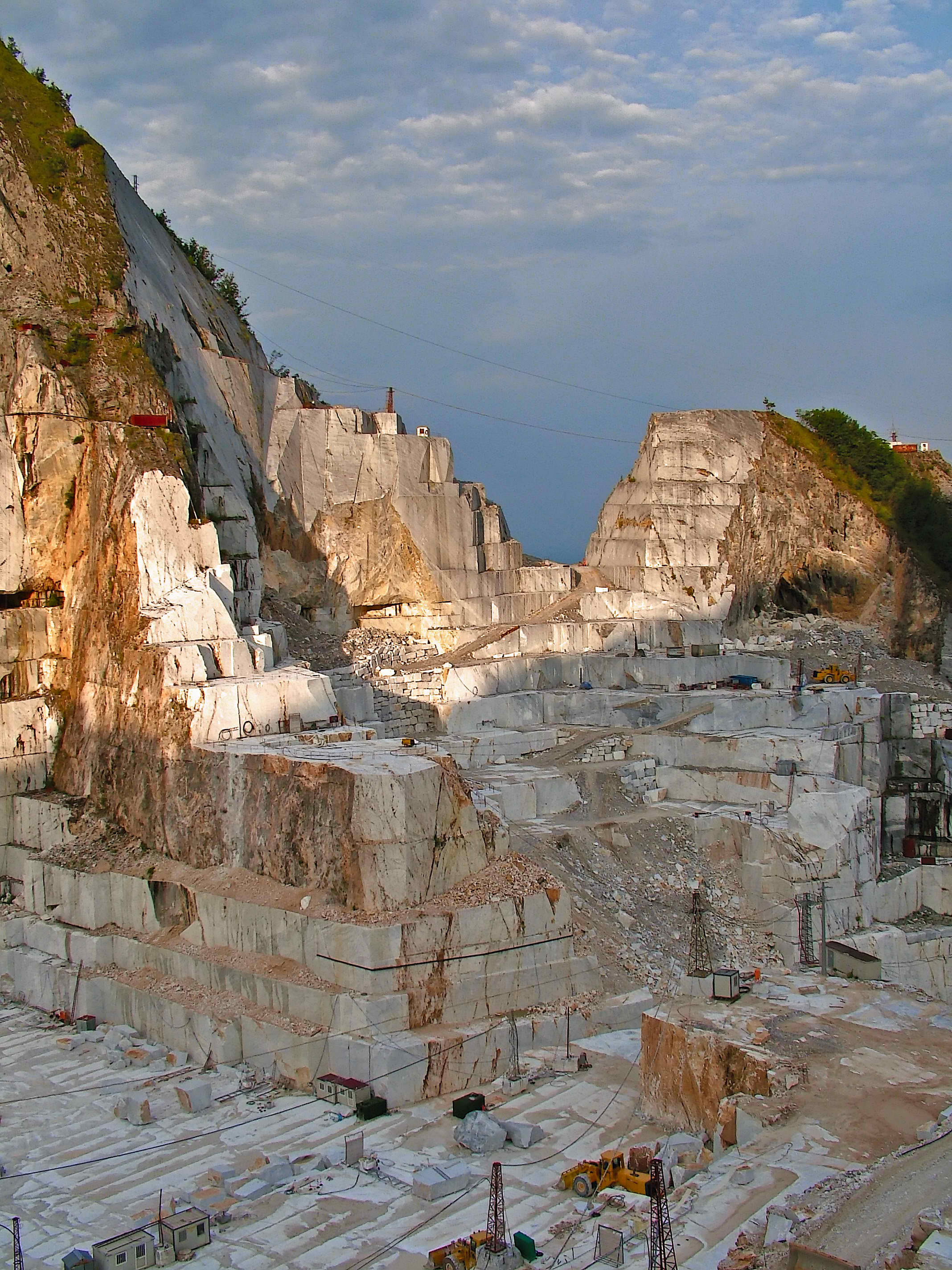
Carrara marble being mined in the Apuan Alps

The chain formed out of sea sediments in the middle Triassic period, somewhat earlier than the rest of the Apennines, and on a rather different geological structure. Over time, these sediments hardened into limestone, dolomite, sandstone, and shale. Harsh pressure approximately 25 million years ago transformed the limestone in many places into the Carrara marble (named for the nearby city of Carrara) for which the range is renowned. Erosion carved much of the remaining sedimentary rocks into a jagged karst topography.

The No Cav environmental movement is fighting for the closure of the marble quarries in the Apuan Alps due to their environmental impact.

== Fauna ==
The principal mammals are squirrels, dormice, moles, Hazel dormice, foxes, hares, martens, weasels, badgers, and polecats.

The area is home to over 300 species of birds, including the red-billed chough, common raven, buzzard, golden eagle, peregrine falcon, and kestrel, barn owl, little owl, tawny owl, and common owl.

Many migrant species are present too: the common nightingale, the black redstart, the red grouse, the wryneck, the cuckoo, the wallcreeper, and the alpine swallow while many species of passerines and tits, the great spotted woodpecker, and the green woodpecker are present throughout the year and well distributed.

== Main peaks ==
- Monte Pisanino (1,946 metres (6,385 ft)) – The highest peak in the Apuan alps
- Monte Tambura (1,890 m)
- Monte Cavallo (1,888 m)
- Pania della Croce (1,858 m)
- Monte Grondìlice (1,808 m)
- Monte Contrario (1,788 m)
- Pizzo d'Uccello (1,781 m)
- Monte Sumbra (1765 m)
- Monte Sagro (1,749 m)
- Monte Procinto (1,177 m)
