= Lago di Gramolazzo =

Lake in Tuscany, Italy

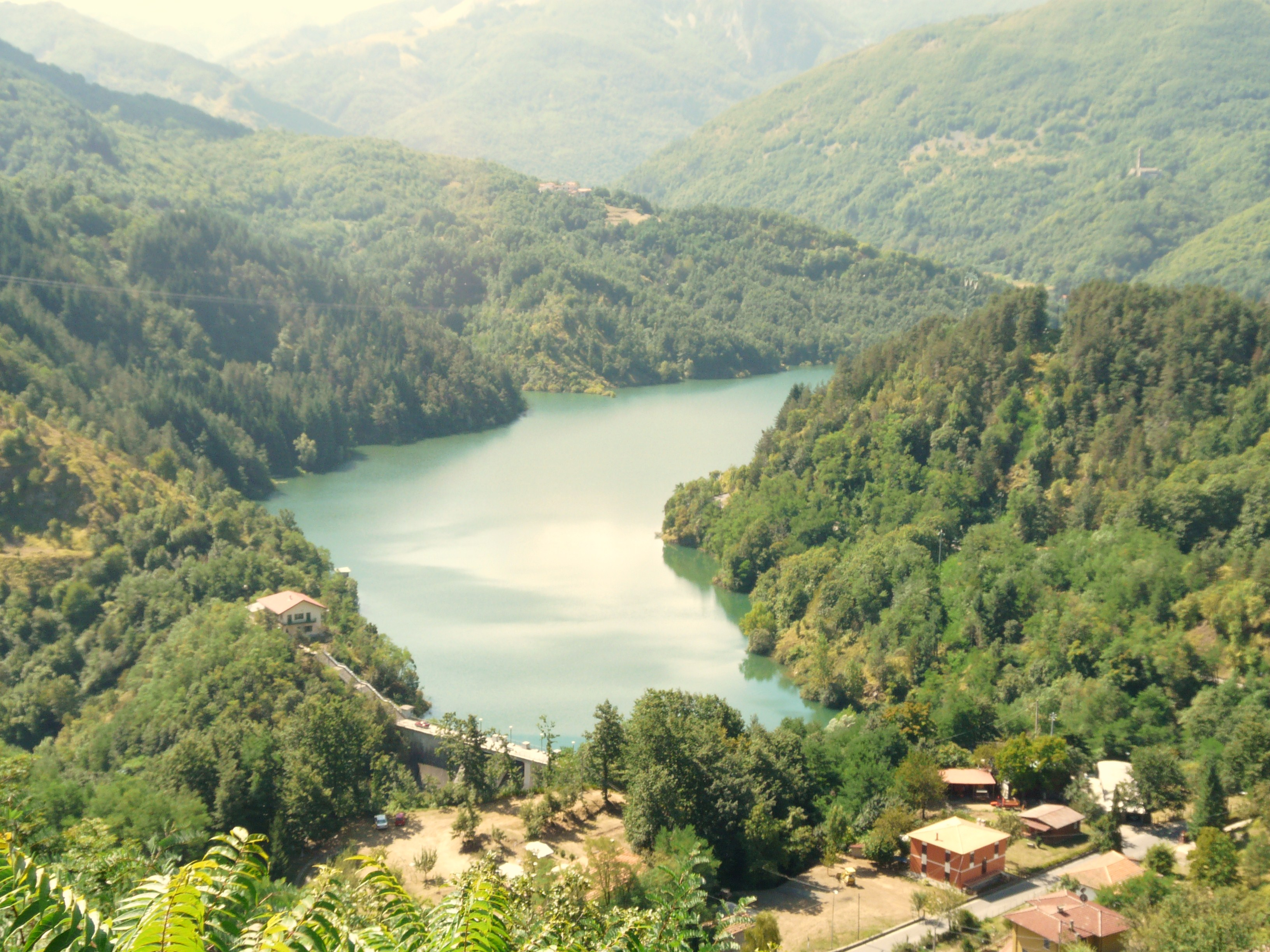

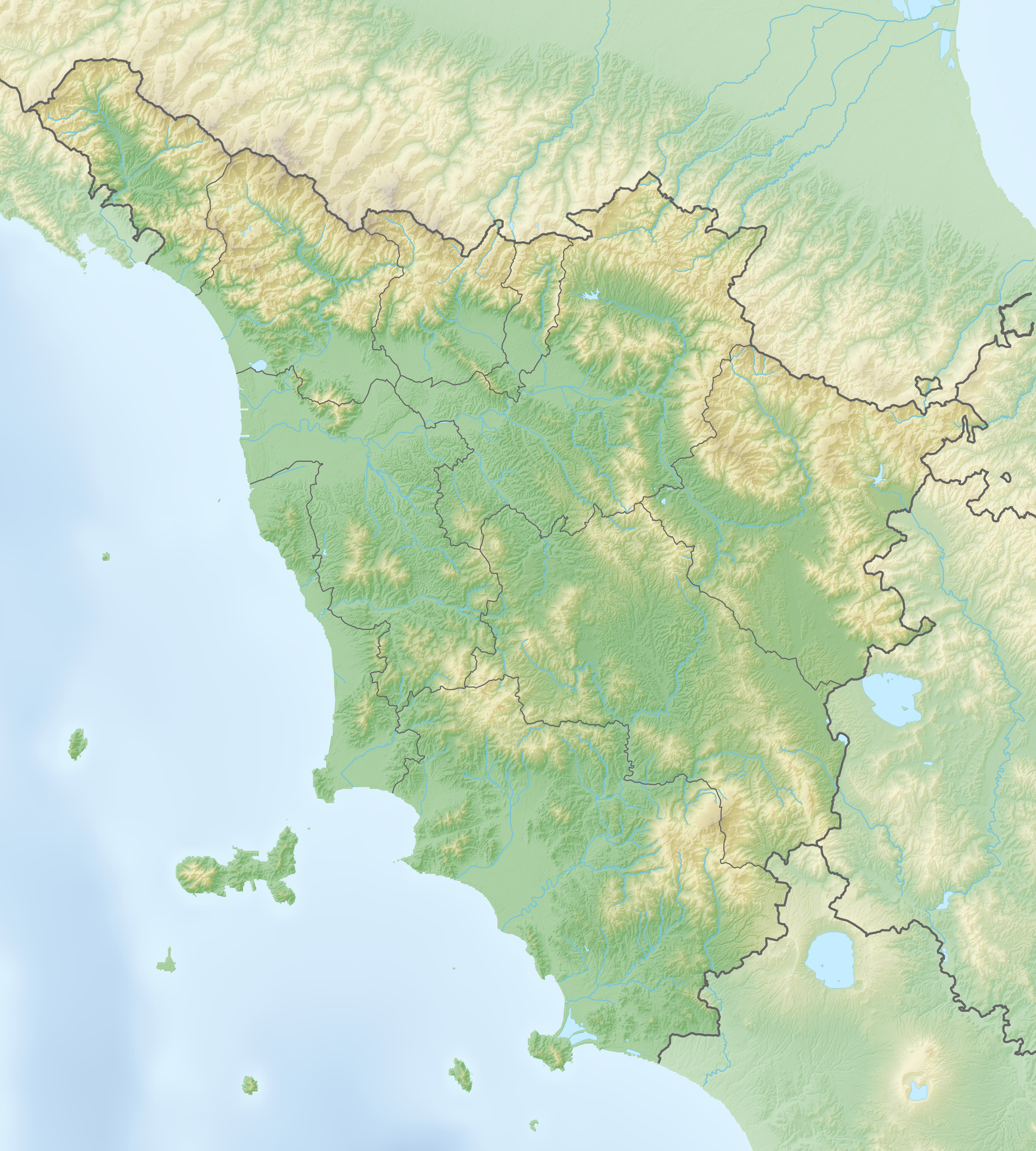
- Location within Tuscany
- Location: Province of Lucca, Tuscany
- Coordinates: 44.163559°N 10.251092°E
- Primary inflows: Serchio di Gramolazzo
- Primary outflows: Serchio di Gramolazzo
- Basin countries: Italy
- Surface area: 1 km^{2} (0.39 sq mi)
- Surface elevation: 604 m (1,982 ft)

Lago di Gramolazzo is an artificial lake in the Province of Lucca, Tuscany, Italy. At an elevation of 604 m, its surface area is 1 km².
