= Monte Sagro =

Mountain in Italy

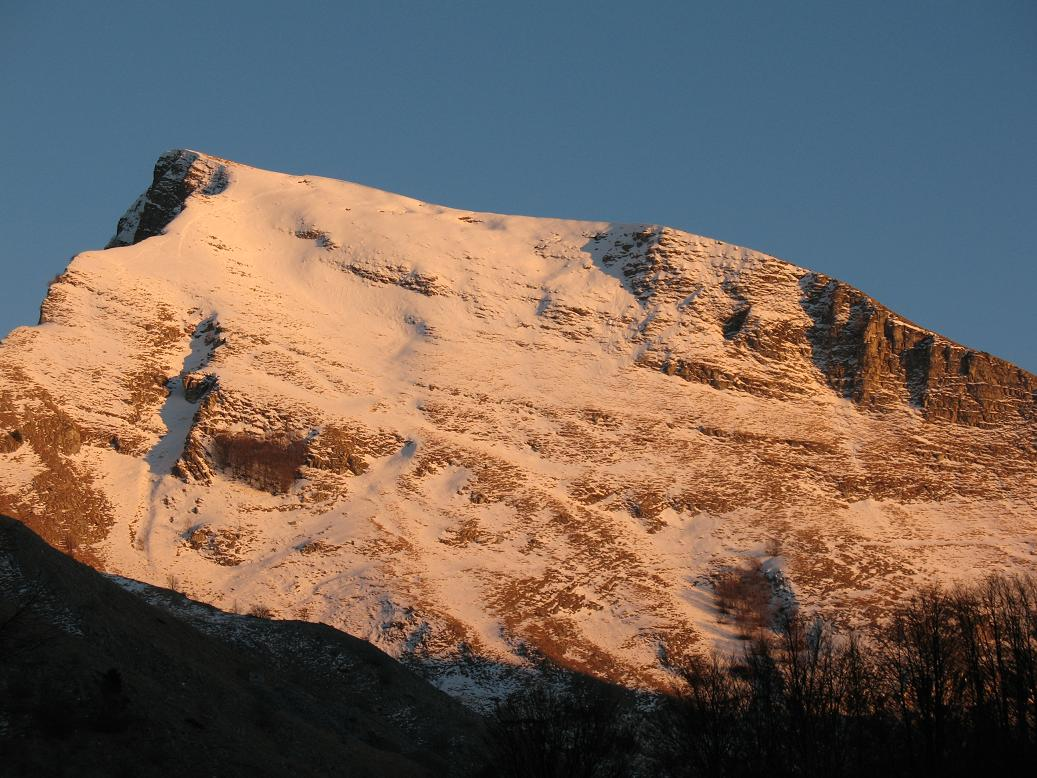

Highest point
- Elevation: 1,749 m (5,738 ft)
- Prominence: 489 m (1,604 ft)
- Isolation: 2.56 km (1.59 mi)
- Coordinates: 44°06′55″N 10°09′33″E

Geography
- Location: Tuscany, Italy
- Parent range: Apuan Alps

Monte Sagro (1749 m) is a mountain located in the northern part of the in the Apuan Alps or Carrara Mountains, in Tuscany, central Italy, overlooking the city of Carrara.

== Etymology ==
The name comes from the Latin word sacrum meaning "holy" as it was a sacred place for the ancient Liguri tribe where there were nine stele statues discovered in 1905, together with the Monte Bego at the modern boundary between France and Italy.

== Geology ==
Monte Sagro consistsmainly of layers of banded limestone, marble, grezzoni and permian schist.

The elevation is from the uplift of these rocks and metamorphosis that compressed the limestone to marble and further erosion that shaped the mountain to what it is.
