= Forna =

Forna is a surname. Notable people with the surname include:

- Aminatta Forna, British writer of Scottish and Sierra Leonean ancestry
- Mohamed Sorie Forna, Sierra Leonean medical doctor, politician, and government minister
- Namina Forna (born 1987), Sierra Leonean American author of young adult fiction and screenwriter

== See also ==
- Fornas, another surname
- Forni (surname), another surname
