= Agostino Ghirlanda =

Italian painter

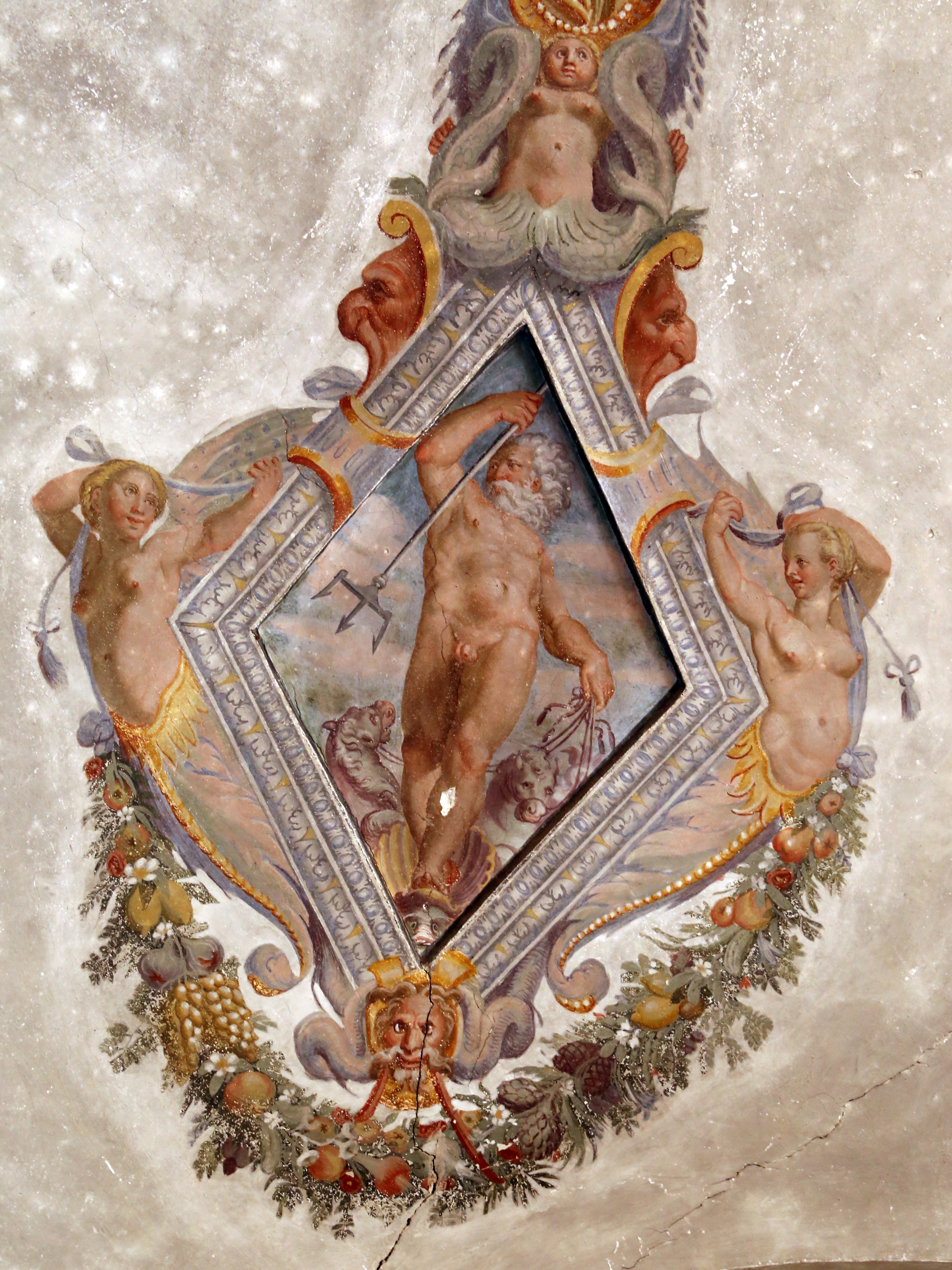
Neptune, Villa Rita, Vicopisano

Agostino Ghirlanda, also known as da Fivizzano, (16th century) was an Italian painter.

== Biography ==
He was born in Massa, and active there, as well as in Lucca and Pisa. He first married in 1576, and was painting frescoes in Massa in 1584. he painted frescoes for the "Loggetta" in the Palazzo dell'Opera found flanking Piazza dei Miracoli in Pisa.
