= Republic of Bobbio =

Short-lived partisan state

Republic of Bobbio Repubblica di Bobbio
- 1944
- Flag
- Status: Unrecognized state
- Capital: Bobbio
- Common languages: Italian
- Demonym: Bobbiese
- Government: Italian partisan republic
- Council of the Republic of Bobbio
- Historical era: World War II
  - Established: July 7 1944
  - Battle of the Penice: August 27 1944
Preceded by	Succeeded by
Italian Social Republic	Italian Social Republic

The Republic of Bobbio was a short lived partisan state centered around the Italian city of Bobbio in Piacenza province. The republic extended for ~90 kilometers, from Val Trebbia to the Oltrepò Pavese. The small amount of fascist forces in the area failed to stop the partisans' expansion of influence throughout Piacenza's many valleys, and on July 7, 1944, Nazi forces were forced to retreat after partisans had disarmed anti-aircraft militia.

== History ==
=== Background ===
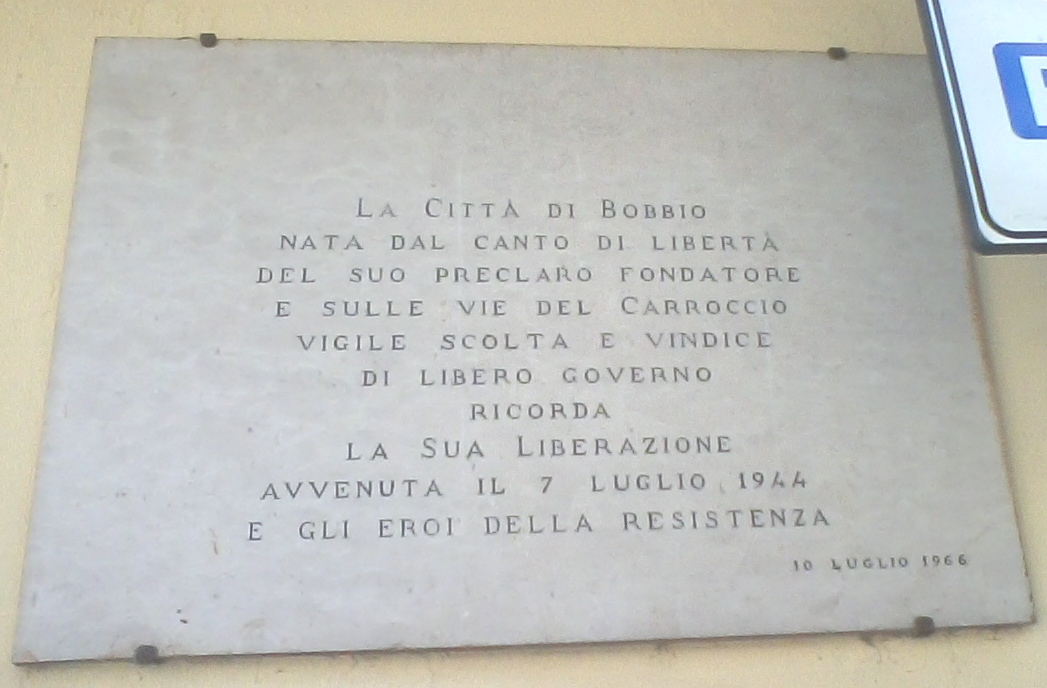
Commemorative plaque celebrating the liberation of Bobbio and the founding of the Republic

Bobbio (of about 6,500 residents in 1944) is a historic town of strategic and logistical importance. It was in the heart of the "Four Provinces" (Alessandria, Genoa, Pavia, Piacenza) and had a vast road network extending off of it. Thus, partisan activity here extended along the roads to as far as Liguria and Lombardy, in a rough quadrilateral between the cities of Voghera, Rivergaro, Genoa, and Sestri Levante. The territory of Bobbio itself had only been part of Piacenza province for a few decades; in fact, until the unification of Italy, it had its own province until it became the Bobbiese District in Pavia province until 1923.

=== History ===
At 7:30 am, July 7, 1944, Virgilio Guerci and Italo Londei of the partisan leaders marched into Bobbio, followed by partisan brigades and declared the formation of the Republic of Bobbio and its subdivisions: the northern Zone A in Piacenza and Pavia, and the southern Zone B in Piacenza and Genoa. All fascist forces in Bobbio were forced to abandon Bobbio and its surrounding valleys. On August 1, the partisans of the Republic of Bobbio occupies the Bobbiese Municipal Hall and elects Mayor-Commissioner Antonio Bruno Pasquali and Deputy Commissioner Dr. Mario Reposi. A provisional council was created soon after: 12 administrators plus the two aforementioned commissioners. Most of the council consisted of Italian Socialists, followed equally by the Christian Democrats, Liberals, and Independents. The first measures were also made to address Bobbio's population; inhabitants not associated with the Italian fascist regime can administer the Republic and receive the esteem of the rest of the population. In London, the radios announced "Bobbio, the first city in Northern Italy is liberated".

To handle logistics and food distribution, permits and price lists were created for all families in Bobbio, with the poorest getting preferential treatment. A hospital was repurposed to treat both partisans and citizens, and a weapon repair workshop was constructed. Printing presses were also created to spread partisan propaganda and news.

=== Battle of the Penice ===
On August 22, German forces began an offensive round up to clear northern Italy of partisans. Approximately three to five thousand German soldiers, including Italians from the Monterosa Division and Turks from the Turkestan Division, began to clash with partisans in the Ligurian Apennines. Fighting reached Bobbio on August 27, and two days of conflict in what is known as the Battle of the Penice (called so after Monte Penice in Bobbio's environs), devastating the partisan forces and breaking up the Republic. It was only on the request of the bishop of Bobbio, Monsignor Bertoglio, that Bobbio was saved from looting and ransacking after Nazi troops re-occupied Bobbio. Following the reconquest, the fascist presence strengthened in the form of 10 new garrisons operated by the Monterosa Italians. In any case, the success of the partisans led to many deserters among the fascist ranks; Italo Londei, with formerly fascist soldiers, joined the new Giustizia e Libertà resistance movement as the GeL's 7th brigade.

=== 2nd Republic ===
In the following months of September and October, weakened by the amount of Italian deserters, partisan activity popped up among the north Italian valleys. On October 22, a 2nd Liberation of Bobbio (led by former troops of the Monterosa Division) succeeded, leading to the formation of two free zones: Free Zone of Torriglia, and the Free Zone of Varzi, constituting a "2nd Republic of Bobbio". This occupation of Bobbio would continue until November 22.

=== Fall of the 2nd Republic ===
On November 22, a month after the declaration of the revived Republic, the Germans launch a second winter round-up, which scatters the partisans occupying Bobbio back into the mountains and Bobbio once again under fascist occupation. Though the capture of Bobbio lasts another two days, the round up will end in January 1945, where the Germans leave the region in the hands of a few fascist garrisons. The partisans attempt one last try at re-liberating Bobbio and failing in March 4, though in April 1945 Piacenza is completely liberated from fascist forces by Americans.
