= Bobbio =

- Comune
- Comune di Bobbio
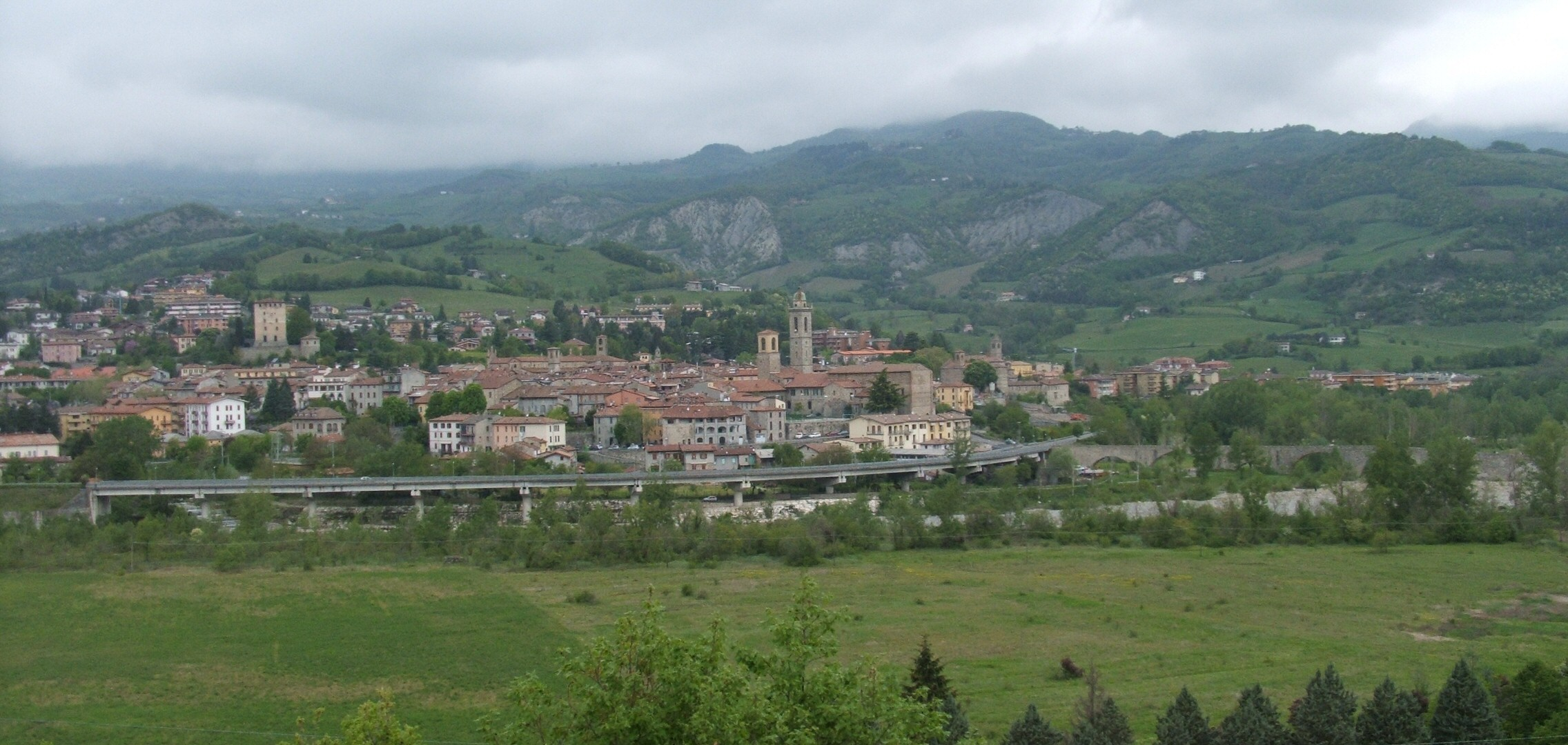
- View of Bobbio

- Coat of arms

- Location within Italy Location within Emilia-Romagna
- Coordinates: 44°46′N 9°23′E
- Country: Italy
- Region: Emilia-Romagna
- Province: Piacenza (PC)
- Frazioni: Cassolo, Ceci, Dezza, Mezzano Scotti, Santa Maria, San Cristoforo, San Salvatore, Vaccarezza

Government
  - Mayor: Roberto Pasquali

Area
  - Total: 106.5 km^{2} (41.1 sq mi)
- Elevation: 272 m (892 ft)

Population (2018-01-01)
  - Total: 3,724
  - Density: 34.97/km^{2} (90.56/sq mi)
- Demonym: Bobbiesi
- Time zone: UTC+1 (CET)
  - Summer (DST): UTC+2 (CEST)
- Postal code: 29022
- Dialing code: 0523
- Patron saint: St. Columbanus, Assumption of Mary, St. Antonio Gianelli
- Saint day: 23 November, 15 August
- Website: Official website

Bobbio (Bobbiese: Bòbi; Ligurian: Bêubbi; Latin: Bobium) is a small town and comune in the province of Piacenza in Emilia-Romagna, northern Italy. It is located in the Trebbia River valley southwest of the town Piacenza. There is also an abbey and a diocese of the same name.

Bobbio is the administrative center of the Unione Montana Valli Trebbia e Luretta. It is one of I Borghi più belli d'Italia ("The most beautiful villages of Italy").

== Overview ==
Bobbio is located in the heart of Val Trebbia, a valley described by Ernest Hemingway as "the most beautiful in the world". The town is nestled at the foot of Monte Penice, 1,460 metres (4,790 ft) above sea level, on the left bank of the river Trebbia.

Its history is identified with the Abbey founded in 614 by St. Columbanus an Irish missionary, and as a result, it became one of the principal centres of religious culture in medieval Italy, home to a library and basilica. The possessions of the abbey in the Lombard and Carolingian eras spanned the north of Italy. Bobbio is a coveted tourist destination known for its history of art and culture, for nature lovers, and for its ancient monuments. It has from antiquity been a crossroads between different cultures such as the Piacentine, Ligurian, Piedmontese and Pavian.

The historical centre and heart of the city has maintained the characteristics of the medieval village. One town landmark, the Ponte Vecchio, called Ponte Gobbo (Hunchback Bridge), also known as the Devil's Bridge, is an ancient stone bridge of Roman origin, which crosses the river Trebbia in eleven irregular arches. The Shrine of Our Lady of Penice, located on top of Monte Penice, dominates the landscape, and is also visited in winter for its ski resorts.

Historians have speculated that Bobbio was the town in which Leonardo da Vinci completed the Mona Lisa. Carla Glori in December 2011 has published her book Enigma Leonardo:decifrazioni e scoperte where the background of the portrait has been identified as the landscape of Bobbio.

== Landscape and outskirts ==
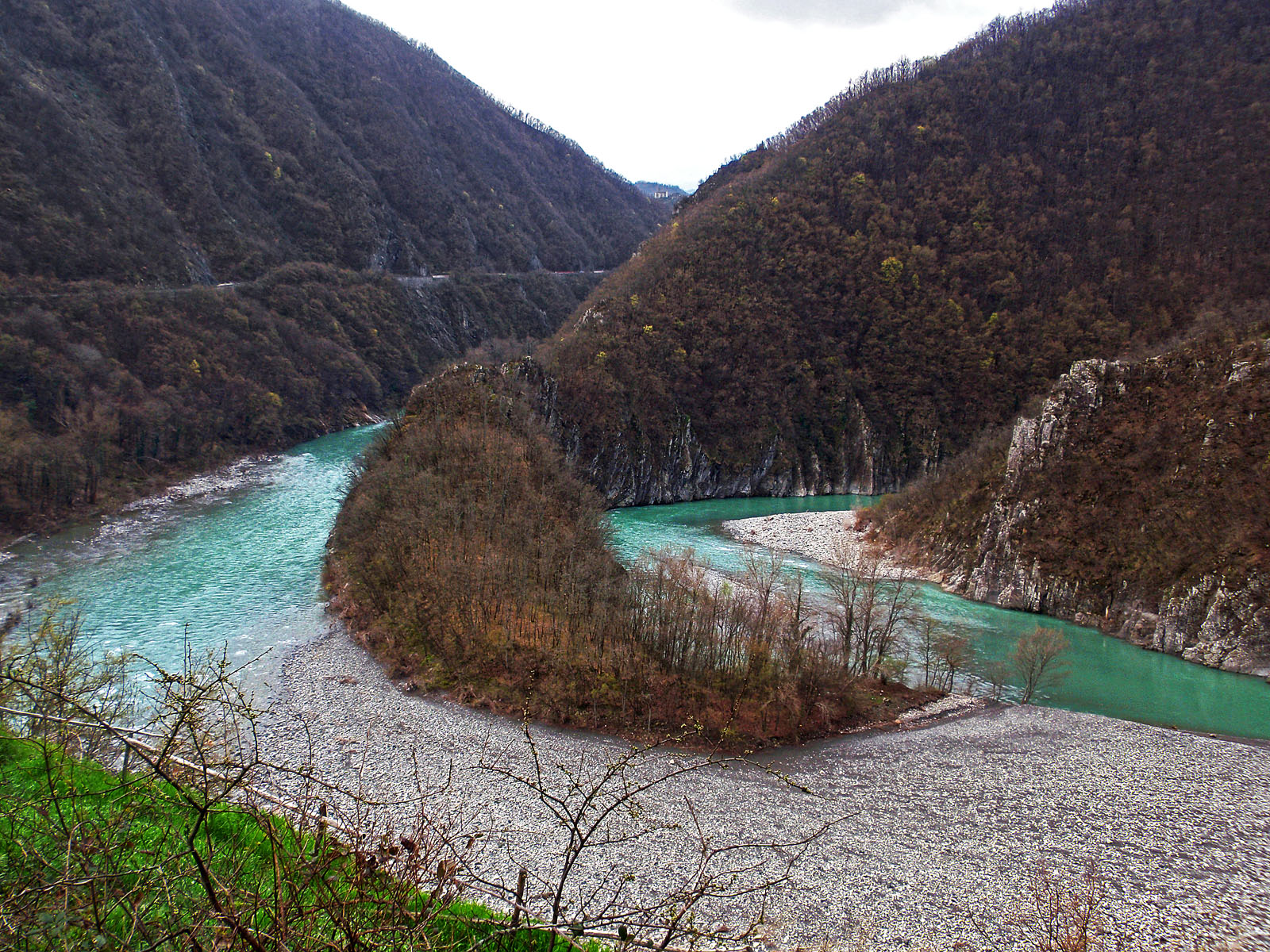
Meanders of San Salvatore

Bobbio is 45 kilometres (28 mi) from Piacenza and from there it can be reached by the state road n. 45, which connects Piacenza to Genova. From Pavia, the route to Bobbio is via road n. 461 and Pass Penice.

From Bobbio, the road to Piacenza is only a few minutes from Barberino Orrido, an overlook of the river Trebbia. Continuing in the same direction you enter the village of Mezzano Scotti, and a few kilometres afterwards, the little village called Perino. It is an ideal starting point for visiting the Perino Valley or the ancient characteristic villages of Aglio and Pradovera.

On the same road but in the direction of Genova and 4 kilometres (2 mi) from Bobbio is San Salvatore, a little village with a wonderful view of the river's meanderings. A few kilometres upstream is Marsaglia and Brugnello, with the ancient Church of Brugnello overlooking the river Trebbia.

From Bobbio, taking the state road n. 461 for Pavia after 12 kilometres (7.5 mi) you reach Passo Penice (1145 m) where there is a ski resort on the top of the Monte Penice (1460 m). This is the location of the ancient Virgin Penice Sanctuary with a view of the region; a few kilometres downhill, near Ceci, is a cross country ski run.

On the other side of the river just 10 kilometres (6 mi) from Bobbio is the village of Coli, situated between pinewoods and pasture fields.

== Trebbia river and valley ==
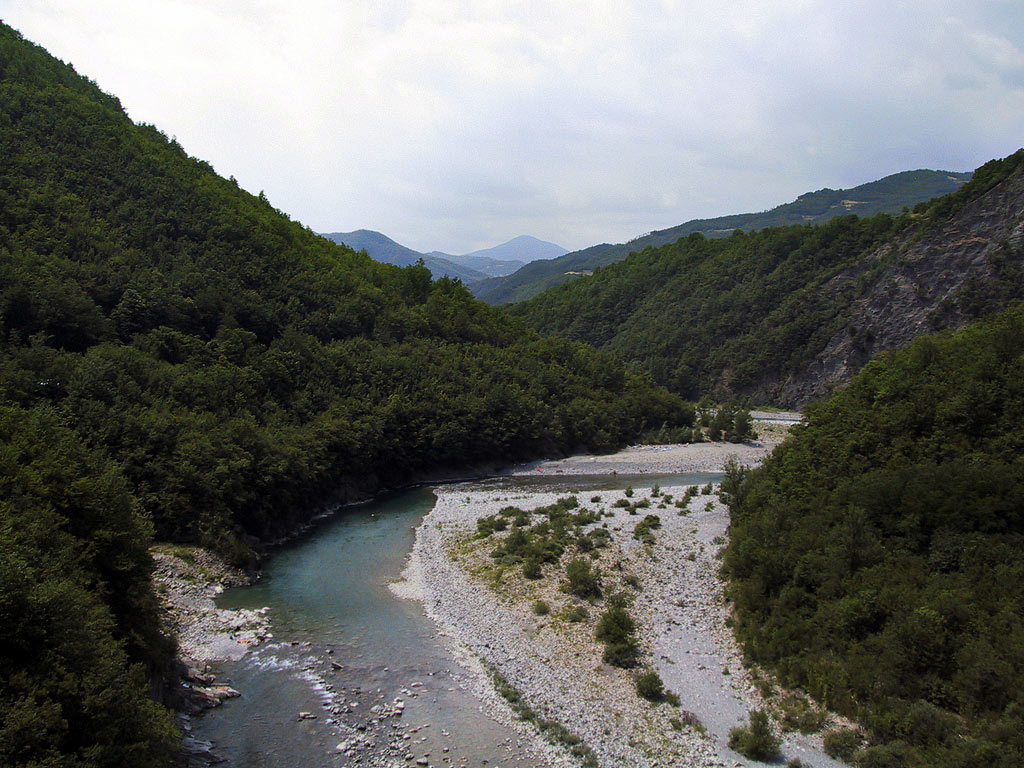
The Trebbia valley in July, a few kilometres upstream from Bobbio.

The river Trebbia is the backbone of Bobbio and its surrounding territory. It springs in Liguria on Mount Prelà and flows 120 kilometres (75 mi) to reach the river Po. Its waters are fresh, clean and run between stones and rocks outlining a twisting journey through overhangs and waterfalls. The Trebbia valley is known among international scholars for its geology.

Common activities on the river include hiking, swimming, sunbathing, canoeing, canyoning and fishing. Trout, balbels and chubs can be found in the river.

The territory around Bobbio is characterized by the Apennines, which influence the climate, contributing cool air in summer and protecting the town from cold winds and fog in winter. On the surrounding mountains are find cultivated fields and pastures, and the woods are habitats for a number of critters (squirrel, dormouse, hedgehog, hare, badger, fox, wolf, wild boar, pheasant, partridge, and many birds) and where a great variety of trees and flowers grow (aromatic herbs, broom, beech, oak, pine, chestnut, spruce, larch).

== History ==
Known to the ancients as Bobium or Ebovium, the town underwent many settlements from the Neolithic Age up to the contemporary one. Several archaeological finds testify to the presence of Liguri, Boii (Gauls of Celtic origin), and from the 4th century BC the Romans.

But the history of Bobbio is tied to the existence of the Abbey founded in 614 by the Irish monk Saint Columbanus (It. Colombano), who received the district from the Longobard King Agilulf.

Bobbio Abbey increased its possessions and became one of the principal seats of culture and religion of Northern Italy and a centre of learning during the Middle Ages, and was renowned for its Scriptorium and library. In the 10th century, there were 700 codices; but its decline in the 15th century led to the dispersal of the library. The monastery was officially suppressed by the French in 1803.

This monastery was in part the model for the great monastery in Umberto Eco's 1980 novel The Name of the Rose.

In 1014 Bobbio was erected a City and Episcopal See and surrounded by city walls that form the Contea of Bobbio.

The city lay in the region of Liguria but in 1230 Piacenza conquered Bobbio and its dominion lasted until the 14th century when the Contea of Bobbio passed, first, under the rule of the Malaspina, and then under the rule of the Visconti, the dukes of Milan.

In 1387 the city passed to the Dal Verme family and formed the Contea of Bobbio and Voghera; in 1516 the area formed the Marchesate of Bobbio.

The town became part of the domains of the House of Savoy in 1748 after the Wars of Succession and formed the Province of Bobbio.

In 1796 the French arrived in Italy and only four years later Napoleon suppressed the monastery and sold its treasures.

From 1815 to 1859 Bobbio and its province were included in the Department of Genoa, then passed to Pavia and finally in 1923 to Piacenza.

On 7 July 1944, the partisan resistance in Italy conquered the town, formed the Republic of Bobbio and governed it autonomously until it was crushed by the Germans on 27 August, the same year.

The bishopric dates from 1014. On 30 September 1986, the Diocese was suppressed and merged with Archdiocese of Genoa. Since 1989, Bobbio has been united with the Diocese of Piacenza to form the Diocese of Piacenza-Bobbio.

== Mona Lisa ==
Recent historical-artistic studies and confirmed scientific hypotheses have shown that the landscape that is the background to Leonardo da Vinci's Mona Lisa is taken from Bobbio. The landscape that forms the background to the picture is that of Bobbio seen from the Malaspina Dal Verme Castle, according to the scientific researcher Carla Glori. Furthermore, on the basis of these historical-artistic studies, she is identified as Bianca Giovanna Sforza, the girl portrayed in the painting by Leonardo da Vinci.

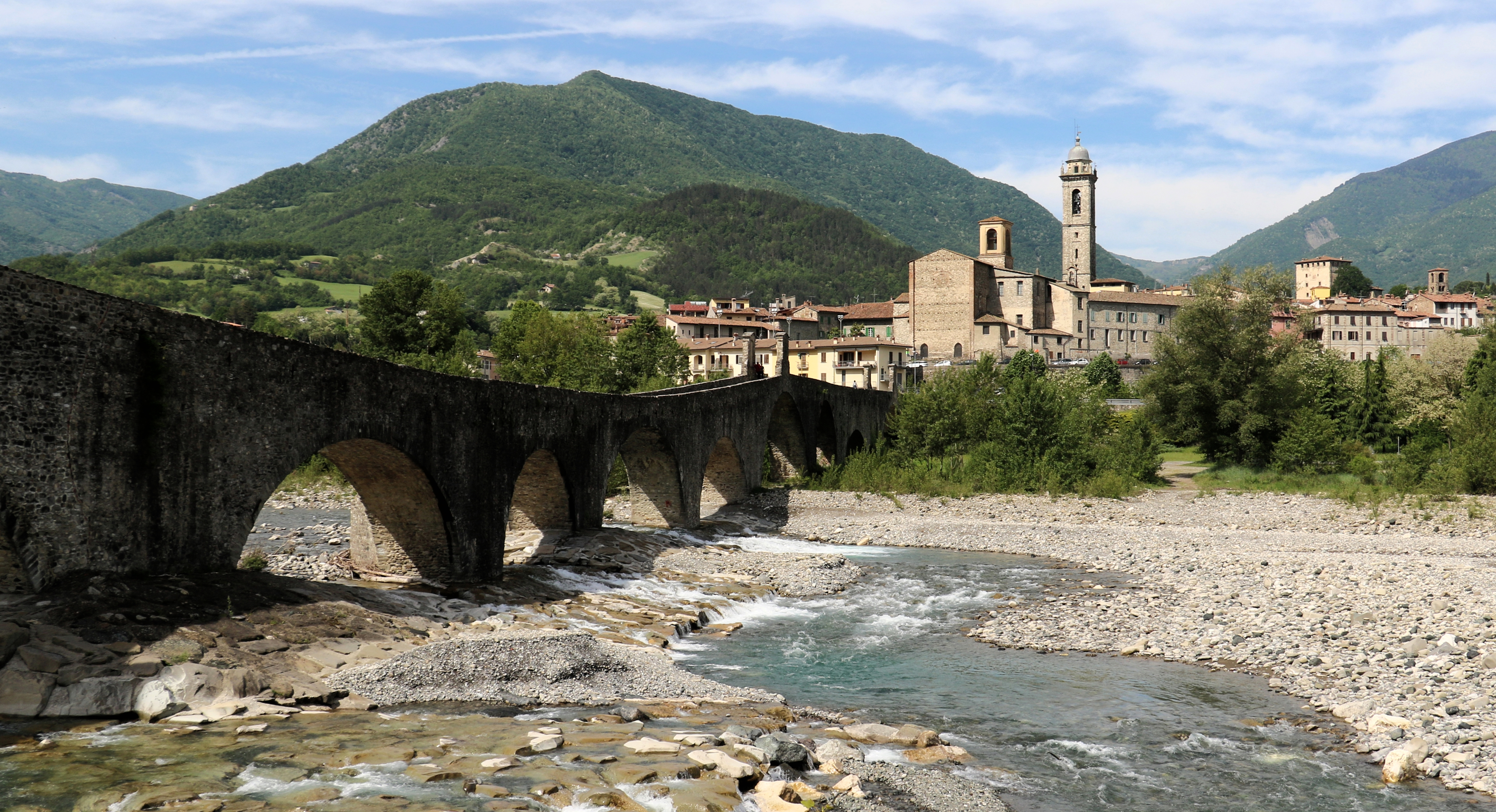
Ponte Gobbo or Ponte Vecchio - Bobbio (Piacenza)

The full Mona Lisa painting (English: Mona Lisa, Italian: La Gioconda, French: La Joconde) by Leonardo da Vinci, Louvre

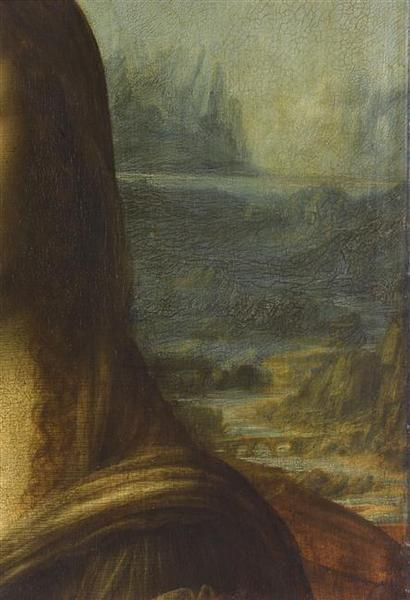
Detail of the background (right side) of Mona Lisa

== Main sights ==
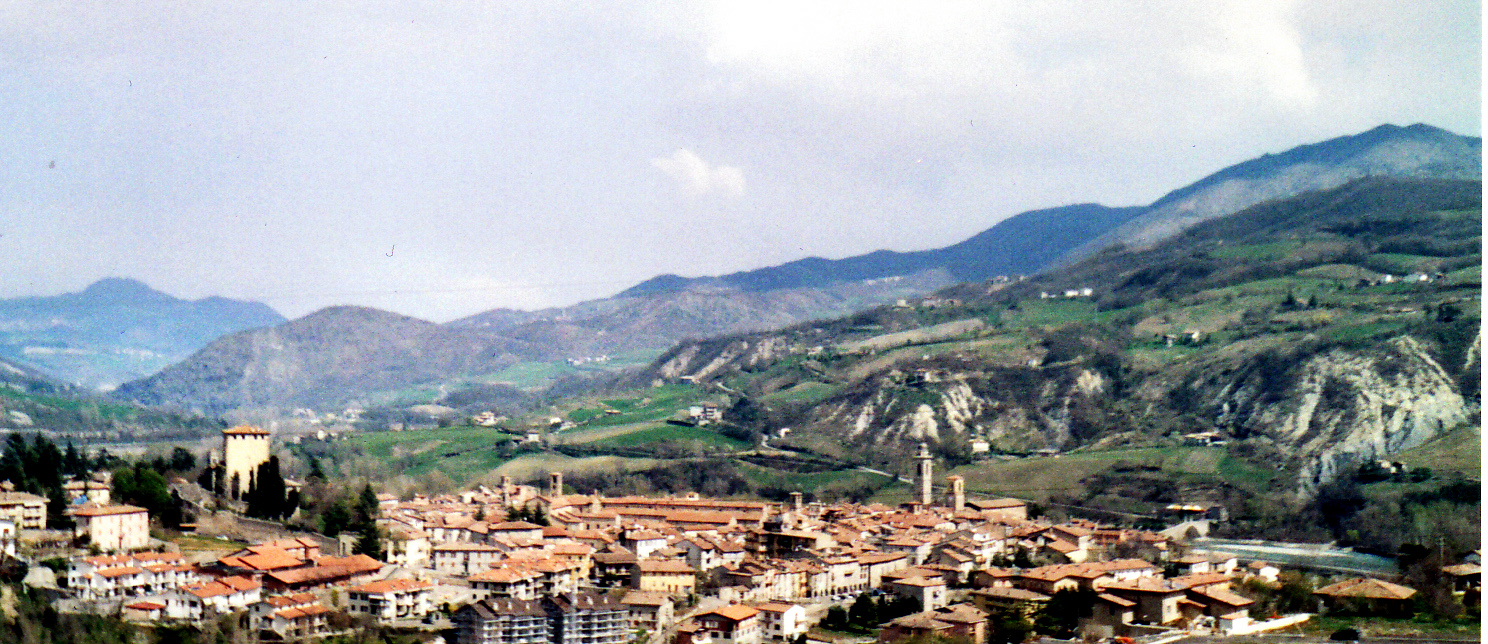
Panorama of the old town of Bobbio

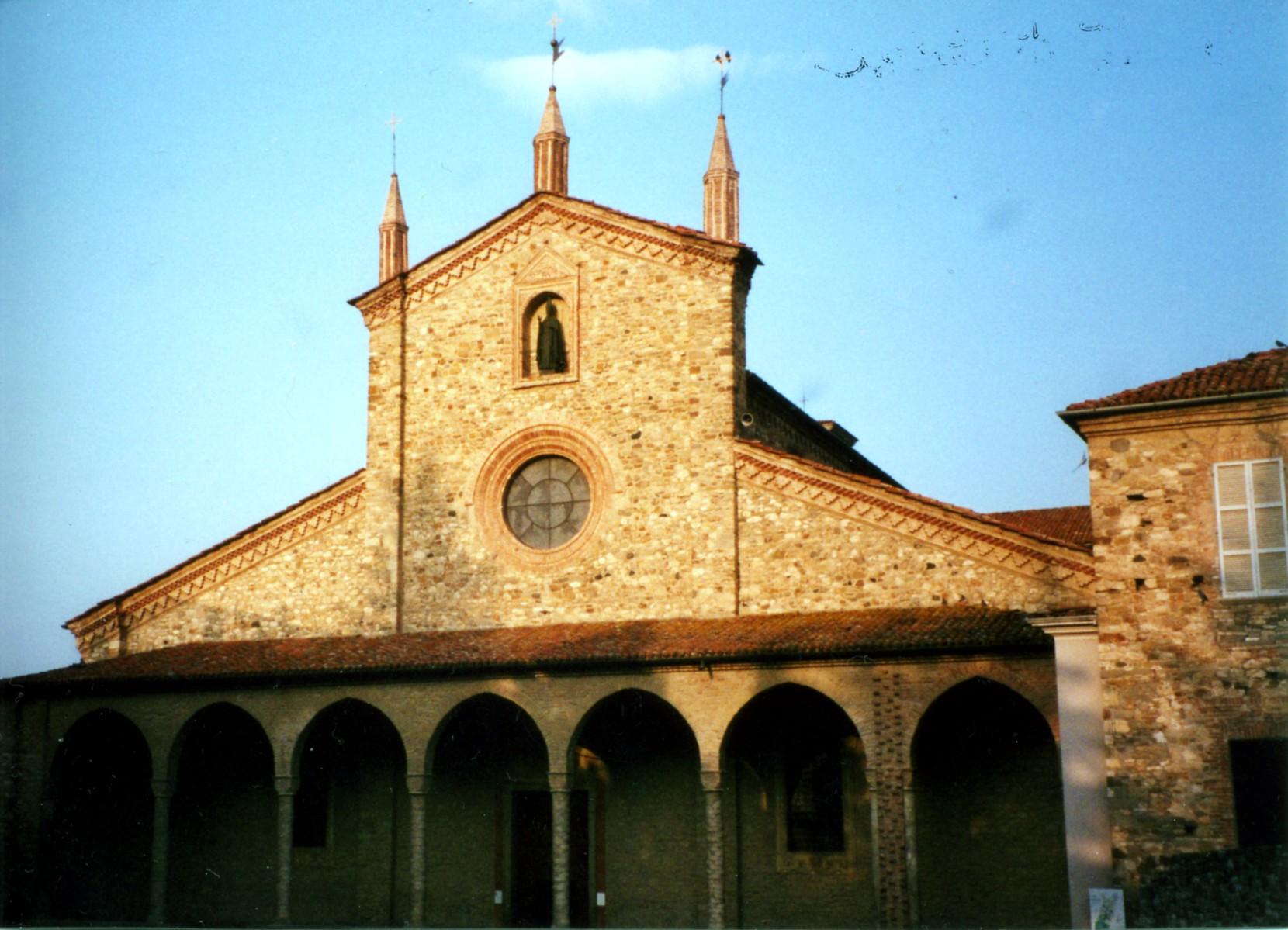
The Basilica of Saint Columbanus

- Bobbio Abbey: Former monastery with buildings dating to medieval period, now from open to the public is long ground floor corridor, the main cloister; the service yard; the Abbey Museum, recently restored and enlarged, collects remarkable works and art objects of Roman, medieval and Renaissance ages, and Civic Museum is a sort of didactic journey, whose admittance is from the southern wing of the cloister, the only one that guards the original portico.
- Saint Columbanus Basilica: church built 1456-1522 atop base of a 10th century proto-Romanesque church. Nave frescos (1527) were painted by Bernardino Lanzani; the wooden choir (1488) carved in Gothic style. The crypt is paved with 12th-century floor mosaic; the marble sarcophagus (1480) of Saint Columbanus made by Giovanni de Patriarchi; two marble pluteos used as tombstones of Saint Attala and Saint Bertulf; and a 12th-century wrought iron gate.

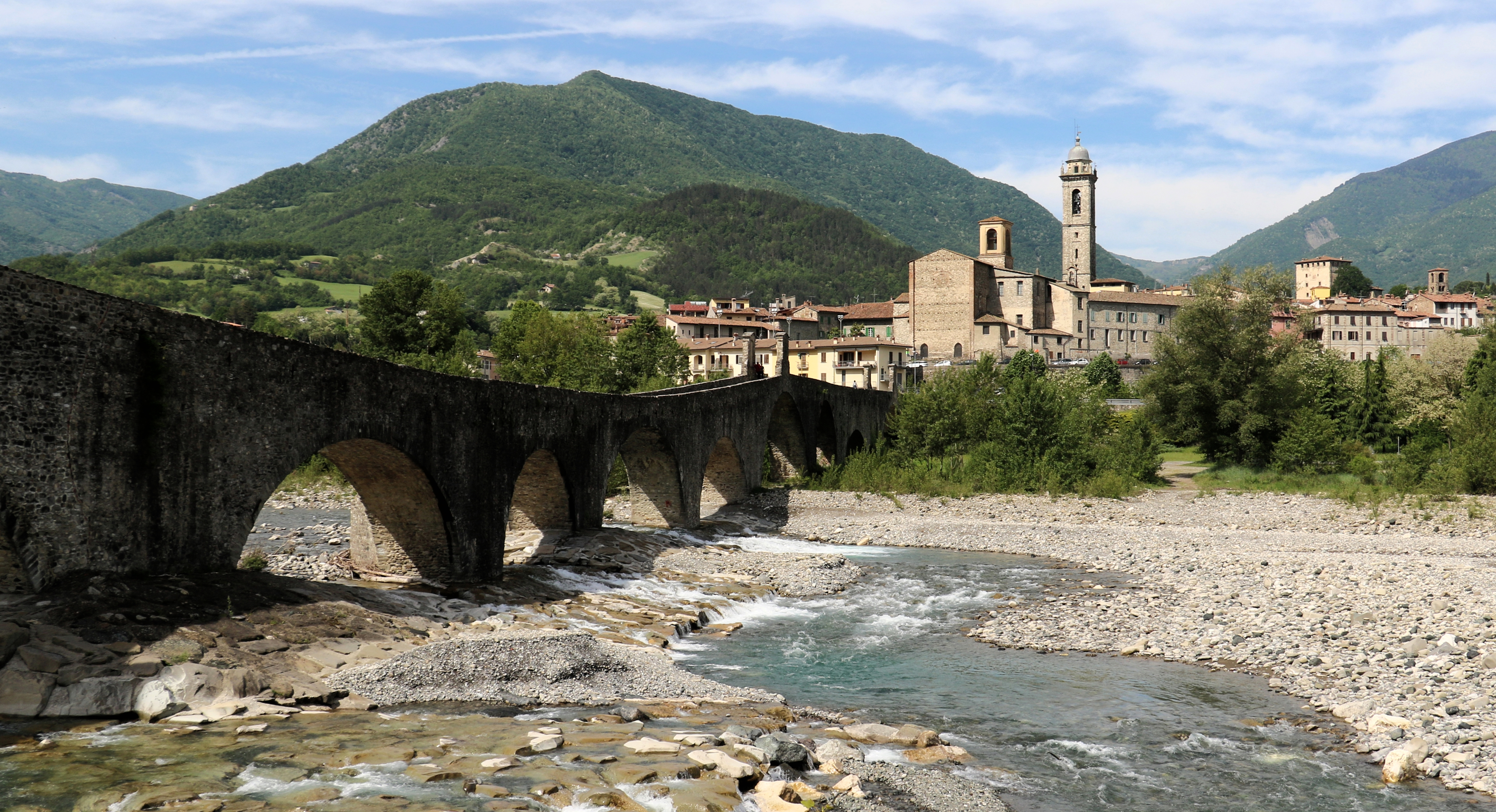
Stone arch bridge over the Trebbia river

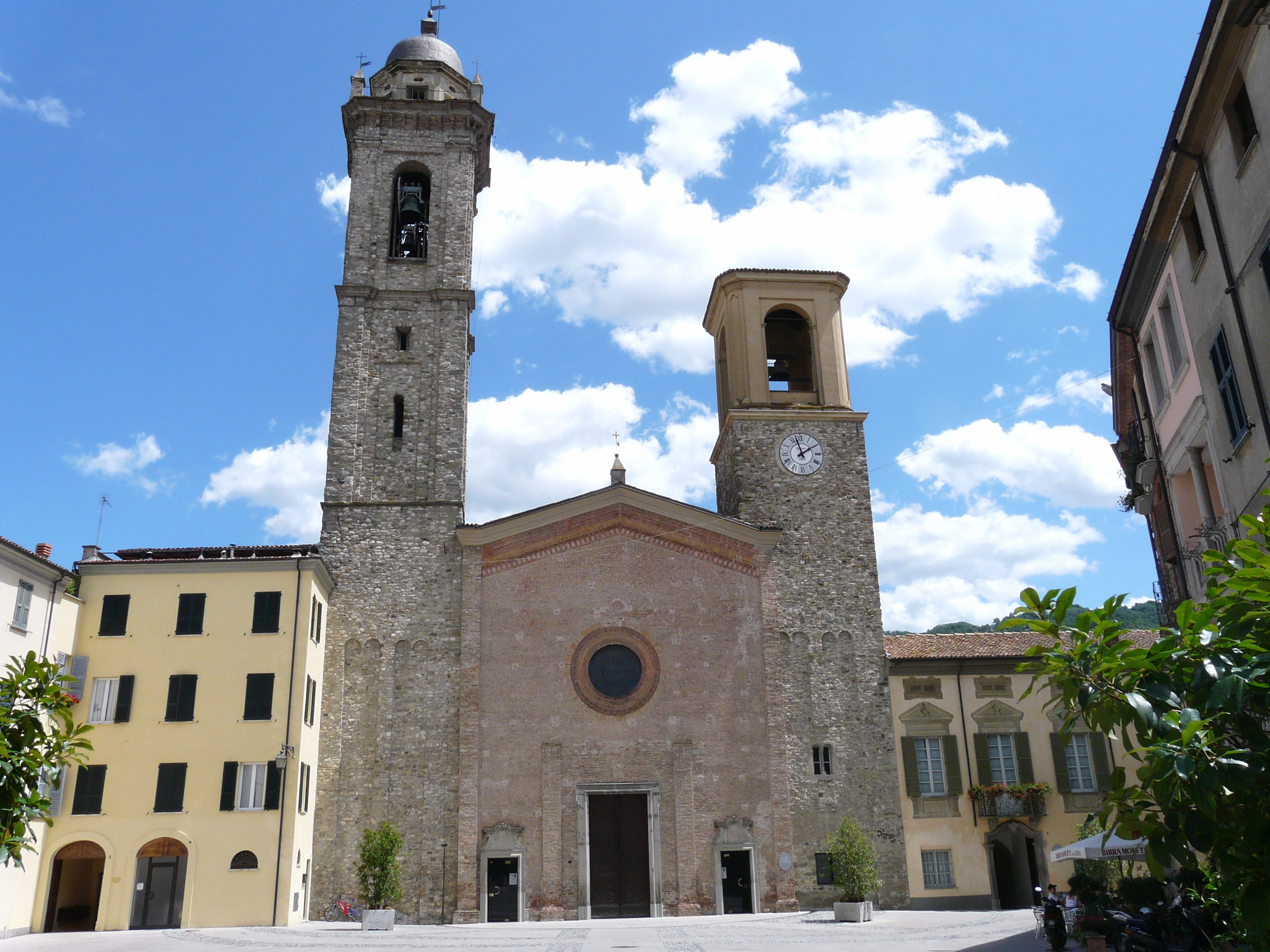
Bobbio Cathedral

- Ponte Vecchio (Old Bridge): the 280-metre (920 ft) long bridge, also known as Ponte Gobbo (hunchback) or del Diavolo (of the devil), spans the Trebbia river by means of eleven unequal arches. A likely Ancient Roman bridge existed here prior to 1196. One legend about the bridge tells that it was built by the Devil in one night after he made a pact with St Columbanus who promised him the soul of the first passerby; but when the bridge was finished the Irish Saint sent a dog across. In another legend, a man tricks Satan into rebuilding it overnight after it has been destroyed by a flood. In reality, the bridge was reconstructed after flood damage in the 16th and 17th centuries.
- Malaspina-Dal Verme Castle: Begun by Corradino Malaspina in 1304 on the hill overlooking the town, it remained for the duration of his rule a Ghibelline stronghold. Today it is a square-plan keep, two minor service towers and defensive walls. By the castle affords a good view over the town and the surrounding countryside. In 1800, under the name of Castello Bobbium, the property and marquessate were purchased by the Piccinini family of Emilia-Romagna, who possessed them until 1956 when the castle and land were ceded by the Piccinini to the Italian State.
- The Castellaro:old historic quarter under the castle and the park (9th century).
- Bobbio Cathedral: Built in 1075, is the main religious edifice of the city. It has two majestic towers, which are original in the lower parts. The façade is from 1463 (the date in which a portico was demolished), with three portals in Gothic style. The cathedral presents modern decoration in the three naves and an 18th-century decoration in the presbytery and on the transept dome. Through the right transept, you can reach Saint John chapel where there is a splendid fresco of the second half of the 15th century representing the Annunciation. The crypt houses the tombs of the bishops of Bobbio, and the chapel of Saint Antonio Maria Gianelli, bishop of Bobbio.

On the right side is the Palazzo Vescovile ("Bishop's Palace", 11th century), partially renewed in 1448; there is also the garden of the cathedral. On the left side is the Bobbio historical archives: sited into the premises of the Old Seminary, founded in the mid-12th century, they keep precious parchments and fragments of ancient codes dated from the 9th century to the 15th century. Available on microfilm the reproduction of all documents referred to Bobbio.

- San Francesco: church and convent built in 13th-century Franciscan style. The monastery maintained the original shape while the church was rebuilt at the beginning of the 18th century in baroque style. Worth of mention is the inner cloister with squat pillars that sustain four cross vault covered spans on each side and over which runs a wooden loggia with precious medieval capitals columns.
- Saint Lawrence church: built probably in the 12th century it was enlarged during the 17th century. Still visible on the left side are parts of the ancient building while on the right outer wall are two tablets also from the previous church.
- The Virgin Mary's Help Sanctuary: it encloses the remains of the 15th-century church decorated with a miraculous image of the Virgin Mary. In 1611 it was said to have dripped sweat from the forehead. It was given the present baroque classical style in 1641.

Two museums are located within the abbey complex, one devoted to the abbey and one to the town. Among the exhibits is a much-admired carved ivory "bucket" of the 4th century AD.

- The Abbey Museum: It collects remarkable works and art objects of Roman, medieval and Renaissance Age. Of the Roman period: the Cocceia family sarcophagus, four cinerary urns, a pagan altar dedicated to Diana and an alabaster Hydra dating back to the 3rd century. Other noteworthy pieces are the longobard stones, the 8th-century tombstone of Cumianus, tin votive ampullae, the Orpheus ivory shrine and the wrought silver Saint Columbanus bust. In the picture gallery a polyptyc by Luini representing the Assumption.
- The Town Museum: sited in the ancient refectory and service room, is a didactic journey through the history of Bobbio and can be a sort of introduction to all the other historical places of the town. The first section is dedicated to the life and works of the Irish Saint, while the second section looks at the monastic complex from an architectonic point of view, on a computer which runs a program for a virtual visit of the building, but it is also about the Scriptorium that made Bobbio the greatest cultural centre of northern Italy. The dressing made of light and transparent supports completed by multimedial means is perfectly integrated with the monumental space of the monastery and its educational aim.
- The monastery of Santa Chiara and Palazzo Comunale (15th century).
- The ex Church of Our Lady of Grace: ex-hospital pharmacy monastic abbey of the 9th century, now cinema since 1910 and hostel.
- The ex Convent and Saint Nicolas' Church (17th century).
- The ancient Palaces Bobbiensis: Palace of Porta Nova with arcades (15th century), Castelli Palace (17th century), Brugnatelli Palace (porches and cubic capital with head apotropaic 13th sec.), Palace of pharmacy (15th century), Malaspina (10 into the map - 13th century), Tamburelli Palace and municipal hostel (18th century), Olmi (9) (17th century), Alcarini (5) (with the Teodolinda house - 14th century), Calvi Palace (15th century), Donati Palace with the alley of the Strict (15th century), Buelli Palace (16th century), etc.
- Porta Fringuella Square: with the arcades of the 12th century.
- Ancient district of St. Joseph (stone buildings of the 12th century. reworked).
- The district said Borgo with ancient walls and the Mill Ocelli (12th century).
- The old mills: Mill of the City (12th century, reworked), Mill district of St. Joseph (12th century), Bishop's Mill (mill medieval alley today Pertusello private building 12th century).
- The Therm of Bobbio.

=== Main sights in the surrounding area ===
- Pass Penice, 1,149 metres (3,770 ft), is at the foot of Monte Penice, which is a 1,460-metre (4,790 ft) mountain of the Ligurian. It connects Staffora valley (Lombardy) with Trebbia valley (Emilia-Romagna). It is located along the former State Road 461 Passo del Penice. In the square, there is a statue of Columbanus appointed protector of motorcyclists. From here the road that leads to the summit and the sanctuary. In the winter months, there is an active ski resort.
- Ceci and sports centre in cross-country skiing Le Vallette.
- The ancient village of San Salvatore and the twists and turns on Trebbia. The little church was built in 975, with subsequent amendments, as the oratory of the monastic cell documented in the 9th century.
- Parish Church of St. Polycarp, in the hamlet of Ceci. The church was built with the monastic cell of the 9th century.
- Parish Church of St. Peter, in the hamlet of Dezza. The church was built with the monastic cell of the 10th century, rebuilt in the 16th century.
- Parish Church of St. Paul, in the village of Mezzano Scotti. The church was built as a monastery of S. Paul in 891, destroyed in the 15th century, the current building was rebuilt after the 18th century.
- Parish Church of St. Christopher, in the homonymous hamlet of St. Christopher. The new church was built in 1910, replacing the previous arose as a monastic cell documented in 972 of which still remain in ruins.
- Parish Church of St Mary of Carmel, in the village of Santa Maria. The church was built in the 16th century, replacing the previous arose as a monastic cell documented in 862.
- Parish Church of Saint Eustace, in the hamlet of Vaccarezza. The church was built as a monastic cell documented in 862, was remodelled several times over the centuries. Near the church is located Villa Costanza (privately owned), former palace of the Malaspina.
- Sanctuary of St. Mary in Monte Penice (1460 m.). Ancient place of worship, the church is documented in the 11th century, the current building dates back to the 17th century.
- Ethnographic Museum Trebbia (Callegari fraction of Cassolo village).
- Castle of Dego (or Barberino) (privately owned), a fortress built in the 13th century Malaspina currently.
- Castle of Scotti (private), a fortress built in 1488 in the resort of Poggio hamlet Areglia (or Area) by Bartolomeo Scotti, destroyed by the Dal Verme in 1516, was rebuilt after a while, currently renovated.
- The old mill Erbagrassa near the hamlet of Ceci currently teaching as a mill visit.
- Tower of Cadonica (private), built in the homonymous hamlet, as a new monastic seat in 1460 along with the new monastery, after the abandonment and destruction of the Monastery of S. Paul Mezzano, near the Oratory of the Mill.
- The Stone Parcellara is a mountain of ophiolite serpentine black, although not particularly tall (836 m) dominates the surrounding hills from which protrudes abruptly breaking away in morphology, colour and grandeur. It allows, from the top, a panoramic view of the whole valley. It is accessed by two roads: one going up from Travo passing through the hamlet of Chiosi, the other coming from the step of Caldarola, you get to the top with a fairly easy trail in about ten minutes. At the foot of the stone, there is the ancient oratory of Our Lady of Caravaggio, in the service of the parish church of Mezzano Scotti.
- Embrisi, a small abandoned village in the hamlet of Embrici above the village of Mezzano Scotti, there is the presence of old stone buildings and local artefacts and sculptures carved in sandstone, very interesting faces and heads apotropaic.
- The Carlone Valley with the thermal waterfall with thermal springs near the ancient Middle Ages village San Cristoforo and the old escursonistic Sentiero medioevale per il Santuario del Monte Penice: 5 km. from Bobbio.

== Thermal springs ==
In the outskirts of Bobbio, there are many water springs rich in sodium chloride, bromine and iodine. When their curative properties were not known these waters were exploited to obtain salt. Indeed, already during the Longobard Age, the army leader Sundrarit enjoyed the income of the salt-works sited on the right side of the river Trebbia. Now in San Martino, 1.5 km. from the centre of the town, the spa building Therm of Bobbio, first opened in July 1904 and is currently undergoing restoration for the creation of a modern health centre and a spa where you will be treated diseases of the respiratory system and the skin.

== Culture ==
=== In literature and cinema ===
- The director Marco Bellocchio, whose family is originally from Bobbio, shot in the city and its whereabouts his first successful film, Fists in the Pocket. Many bobbiesi starred in the film as extras. He also edited each year cultural activities related to cinema, particularly by the Laboratory Farecinema and Bobbio Film Festival (with performances in summer).
- The monastery of Bobbio and its library – the richest of the early centuries of the Middle Ages – are mentioned in the novel by Umberto Eco The Name of the Rose.

=== Film festival ===
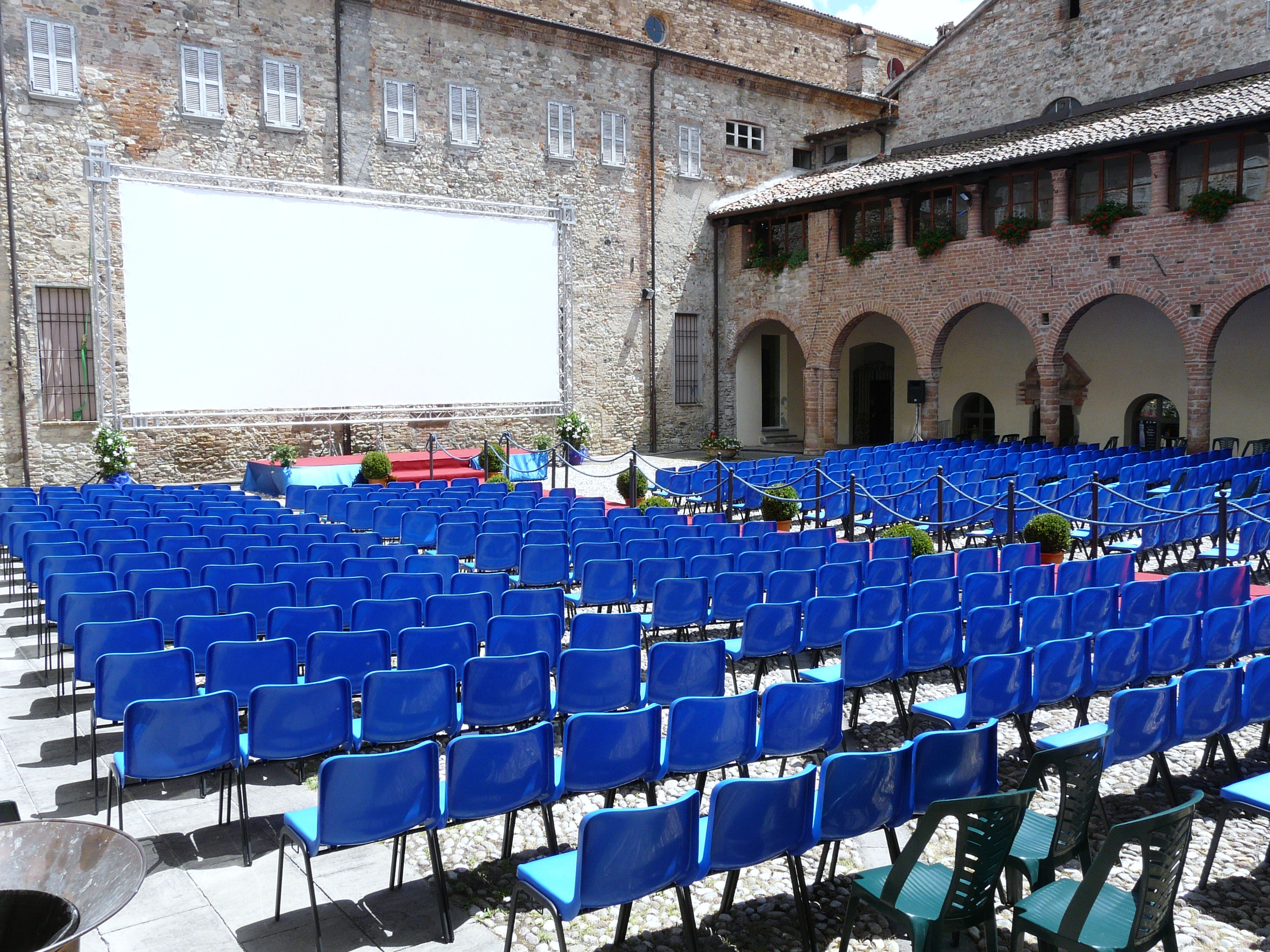
Preparation for the competition of the Bobbio Film Festival

The town of Bobbio has its own film festival director Marco Bellocchio is born from the Laboratory Farecinema, and would eventually become the film competition Bobbio Film Festival. "Farecinema – meet the authors" is the brainchild of Maestro Marco Bellocchio who wanted to create in his hometown, Bobbio, a laboratory for teaching the art of film direction. Already the first edition was held, parallel to the laboratory, an evening film festival open to the public with a film club at the end of screenings where people participated representing the film projected. In 2005 becomes the exhibition Festival, taking the name of "Bobbio Film Festival" and Marco Bellocchio establishing the award "The Hunchback of Gold" in reference to symbols of Bobbio, the medieval Ponte Gobbo, which will reward the film judged the best among those proposed. To review films that work as he moved in the cloister of Saint Columban, where traditionally takes the event. In parallel, the laboratory continues Farecinema that will become a film school and acting, and the town of Bobbio and has also become a movie set with the possibility of participation of extras also taken from the street.

=== Literary contest ===
From 2008 the local newspaper publisher and Pontegobbo piacentino Freedom indicate a literary competition open to young Italian and foreign writers of fiction and poetry. The competition from young unsigned talent and contribute to emerge and become known and appreciated by audiences and critics. Or experts will be recognized and awards for top entries there will be opportunities for public amenities, while those who are established as the winner will get free advertising and inclusion in all contexts of narrative. Piazza Santa Fara parallel in the porch of Saint Columban, the event is held in Piazza managed by Pontegobbo Books, with the chance to meet and buy works of historical fiction local tourism.

=== Palio delle Contrade ===
The Palio is a manifestation of medieval origin, which sees the challenge of the contrada members in various contests of skill, for the conquest of the cloth that crowns the winning contrada. The five historic districts of Bobbio are named after the many gateways to the medieval city existing in the 12th century: Alcarina, Fringuella, Agazza, Legleria and Nova. The event is held on the 2nd Sunday of August is organized by Pro Loco, open in the early afternoon from the historical procession that will wind from the Castle along the downtown streets to St. Fara Square, saw representatives from each district compete in the historic city centre in various contests of skill to decree the winner. The contrada members dressed in the colours of belonging will compete in five challenges: Racing Towers, Launch egg, Rat race Castellana and finally the Greasy Pole in the Cathedral Square. For the younger ones, there is the Palio of the Child. The final prize giving with the delivery of the "Palio" concludes the challenge, while at night in every square frame will hold their dinners of the districts.

=== Music and dancing ===
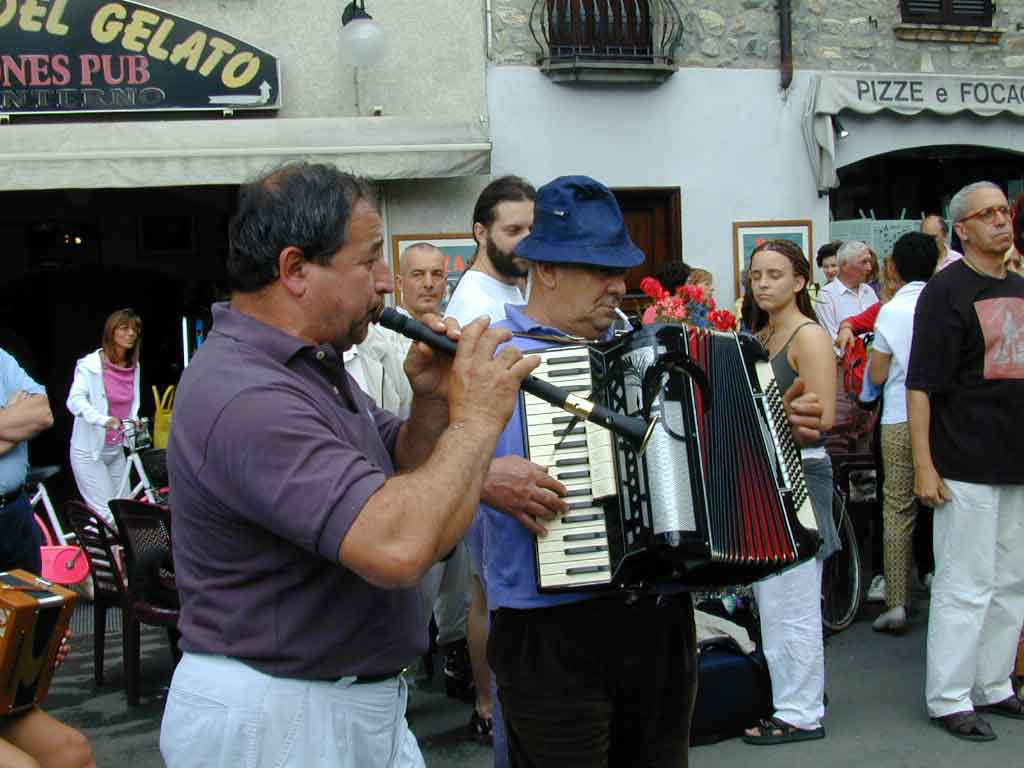
Ettore Losini – Bani The Pied Piper

Positioned in the heart of four provinces (Alessandria in Piedmont – Genoa, in Liguria – Pavia, in Lombardy – Piacenza, in Emilia-Romagna), Bobbio can boast a very old musical tradition, linked to the use of an instrument, the piffero (oboe popular double-reed), which accompanied by accordion, brings a vast repertoire of songs that marked the various stages of life of the community. In addition to the provinces of the four dances (famously jig Bobbio Bala Ghidon), there are tracks for the Carlin May – Cantamaggio, with variant of the feast of the Santa Croce, marriage, Lever (Leva Levon to Santa Maria) and that recall places and events related to the past (the song Draghin). The dances, in addition to waltz, polka and mazurka you can meet archaic dances such as: Alexandria, the monferrina, the jig two.

=== Gerberto Choir – City of Bobbio ===
The choir takes its name from Gerbert of Aurillac who was the abbot of the monastery of St. Columban in Bobbio around the year one thousand and later became Pope with the name of Sylvester II. Gerbert was not only a scholar of astronomy, mathematics and philosophy, but also of music.

Founded by Don Michele Tosi in the 60s the choir reconstituted itself after more than 20 years of inactivity in November 1998, thanks to the efforts of former choir members and of young maestro Edo Mazzoni. The repertoire includes 30 items comprising traditional mountain songs, folklore and songs.

=== Gastronomy and local products ===
The local gastronomy is influenced by the different traditions of the near regions: Liguria, Piemonte, Lombardia and Emilia. As part of the kitchen Piacenza, Bobbio occupies a prominent position could include a series of original local dishes and desserts that are passed down from many generations:

- macaroni bobbies (with the needle) (flour, eggs, oil, water);
- pine nut ricotta (or Pin da Lesa) (flour, potatoes, ricotta, spinach, eggs, and Grana Padano);
- lasagne bobbies (typical lasagna layered with béchamel sauce mixed with meat and mushroom sauce);
- the bobbies stew (with beef, butter, olive oil, garlic Piacenza, flour, onion, dry red wine, salt, pepper, nutmeg, rosemary, bay leaves, sage, carrots, celery, tomato sauce);
- snails bobbies (wet). There is a festival dedicated to and consumed on Christmas Eve in the best restaurants (snails, onion, carrots, leek, celery, tomato sauce, white wine, olive oil, butter, pepper);
- almond cake, all year round in ovens and bakeries of Bobbio (of three types, crisp, full and soft);
- the cake Sandy
- the croccante, a sort of almond sweetmeat.
- Christmas cake (flour, honey, yeast, eggs, raisins, sugar, butter, milk).
- mustard fruit (pear, apple).

In Bobbio, snails and handmade maccheroni shaped with a knitting needle—traditionally served with a beef stew sauce—are traditional dishes consumed on Christmas Eve.

In the right season it is possible to taste the flavoured products of the surrounding woods such as mushrooms and truffles.

And last but not least the numerous locally produced wines all of excellent quality. Tradition says that were the same monks arrived with Saint Columbanus who started the growing of the vine after it was abandoned during the dark age of Middle age.

Bobbio is located at the foot of Ligurian Apennines, in the territory known as Colli Piacentini, near DOC for the production of typical wines such as Gutturnio, Trebbianino Trebbia Val, Barbera, Bonarda, Ortrugo, Malvasia, Cabernet Sauvignon, Pinot (other: Riesling, Dolcetto, Muscat and Merlot).

Bobbio is also known for the sausage: salami, Cups, bacon, Piacenza PDO, sausages of various kinds, and cotechini and zampone.

== Honors environmental and historic cultural ==
Some art historians, including Carla Glori, have suggested that Bobbio and its three-arched Ponte Gobbo (which was destroyed in 1472) are the landscape in the background of Leonardo da Vinci's Mona Lisa.

Bobbio is recognized as a City of Art and Culture.

From 2006 was awarded the Bandiera arancione (it. orange Flag) by Touring Club Italiano, as the high-medieval centre of tourist interest, which stands for excellence and hospitality, and it is also inserted into the World Tourism Organization.

From 2008 is also part of the club The most beautiful villages in Italy (it. I Borghi più belli d'Italia), which included 149 villages throughout the Italian territory.

== Annual events ==
The events are yearly, many are concentrated in the summer, as the manifestation Summer bobbies and Thursday bobbies. Among the hundreds of events we can indicate the most followed:

- The parties and parades of Carnival (February)
- The feast of St. Joseph and Spring (bonfire night) (19 March)
- The Rally Valli Piacentine (May)
- The Fair of St. John (June)
- The Appennino Folk Festival (July)
- The gourmet feast and musical Irish music in Ireland (July)
- The Bobbio Film Festival of Marco Bellocchio (July)
- The exhibition antique market (August)
- The Feast of Assumption with fires evening (15 August)
- The Bobbio-Passo Penice (race vintage cars) (September)
- The grape festival, and shows the mushroom and truffle (October)
- The medieval feast of St. Columban (November)
- The snail festival and Christmas market (December)

Addition, every Saturday morning on the main square, is held the traditional and ancient fair-market, with stalls and markets of various kinds with local produce and Agrobiologica.

== Patronal fiestas and principal religious feasts ==
- May Ascension (ancient columbanian procession from the Castle Malaspina-Dal Verme, with the blessing of nature, earth and the fruits of blessing buslanin, traditional sweets)
- 31 May (end of the month with the Virgin Mary and procession from the Sanctuary to Aid the city streets)
- 5 June Madonna aid (party at Shrine of Our Lady of Aid Bobbio)
- 7 June and 21 October Sant Antonio Maria Gianelli (second patron saint of Bobbio)
- 15 August Santa Maria Assunta (feast of the patron Bobbio and Cathedral of Bobbio, fireworks at Ponte Gobbo)
- second Sunday in September: Our Lady of Peniche (party at Sanctuary of Santa Maria in Monte Penice)
- 23 November St. Columban (feast of the patron Bobbio and all'Abbey of Bobbio preceded the night before the procession of the relic in the rite of Transit)

== Road routes and transport ==
1. By Piacenza after the exit from Motorway A1, take the ring road to the stadium, then we arrive at the junction of the Galleana, located at the southern outskirts the city, where he began the main road to Val Trebbia: Strada Statale 45 di Val Trebbia – SS45, which goes to SW for 45 km towards Genoa;
2. By Milan or Bologna, Piacenza achieved by Motorway A1 or through Via Emilia, take the State Road 45 Val Trebbia – SS45 direction Bobbio – Genoa;
3. By Turin, Cremona or Brescia, Piacenza achieved by Motorway A21, take the State Road 45 Val Trebbia – SS45 in direction Bobbio – Genoa;
4. By Genoa and the Italian Riviera, you climb up along the Val Bisagno to leave the city, across the road from Val Trebbia: Strada Statale 45 di Val Trebbia – SS45 towards Piacenza, which touches the towns of Liguria Bargagli, Torriglia, Montebruno, Rovegno, Gorreto and those of Emilia Ottone and Corte Brugnatella (km 68);
5. By Chiavari and the Italian Riviera, both for the former State Route 586 Valley dell'Aveto – SP 586 through Rezzoaglio and Val Aveto to Marsaglia (Corte Brugnatella) (not recommended in winter) (km 90) or head for the Val Fontanabuona by the route Provincial 225 Val Fontanabuona – SP 225 to Bargagli and incorporated in the State Road 45 Val Trebbia – SS45 towards Piacenza (km 100);
6. By Recco through the Provincial Road 333 – SP 333 to Gattorna (Moconesi) and then the Strada Provinciale 225 – SP 225 to Bargagli and always attach the State Road 45 Val Trebbia – SS45 towards Piacenza (100 km);
7. By Voghera by Varzi and the Monte Penice Pass for the former State Road 461 Pass Penice – SP 461 (km 57);
8. By Castel San Giovanni through the Val Tidone and the passing of Monte Penice Pass for the former State Route 412 Val Tidone – SP 412 (km 50).

From reports the efficiency of communications: in particular the main artery SS 45 Val Trebbia, in fact, it was partly renovated, but still stretches of road with a strong characterization of other times with the logical consequences, lend, so the utmost care when you are in travel it is advised caution and moderation in the rate since the stroke, especially among Rivergaro and Perino, very twisty corners with poor visibility and bumpy surface.

The sections of road mentioned above provide opportunities to view the landscape and to take photographs in all seasons.

Val Trebbia is served from Piacenza providing regular public bus service from Piacenza via Rivergaro, Bobbio, Marsaglia, Ponte Organasco, Brass, Brass depart from the bus routes that connect the upper Val Genoese Trebbia with Genoa, but also the line Brass Bridge-Organasco-Varzi and then Oltrepò Pavia. Bobbio also depart from other local connections: Bobbio-Coli, Bobbio-Marsaglia-S.Stefano Aveto-Rezzoaglio.

== Twin cities ==
- – Ybbs an der Donau, Austria
- (Republic of Ireland) – Navan, County Meath, Ireland

== See also ==
- Parcellara Stone
- Luretta Valley

Manuscripts written in Bobbio:

- Bobbio Jerome
- Bobbio Orosius
