= Orto Botanico delle Alpi Apuane "Pietro Pellegrini" =

Botanical garden in Italy

Coordinates: 44°3′28.43″N 10°11′26.53″E

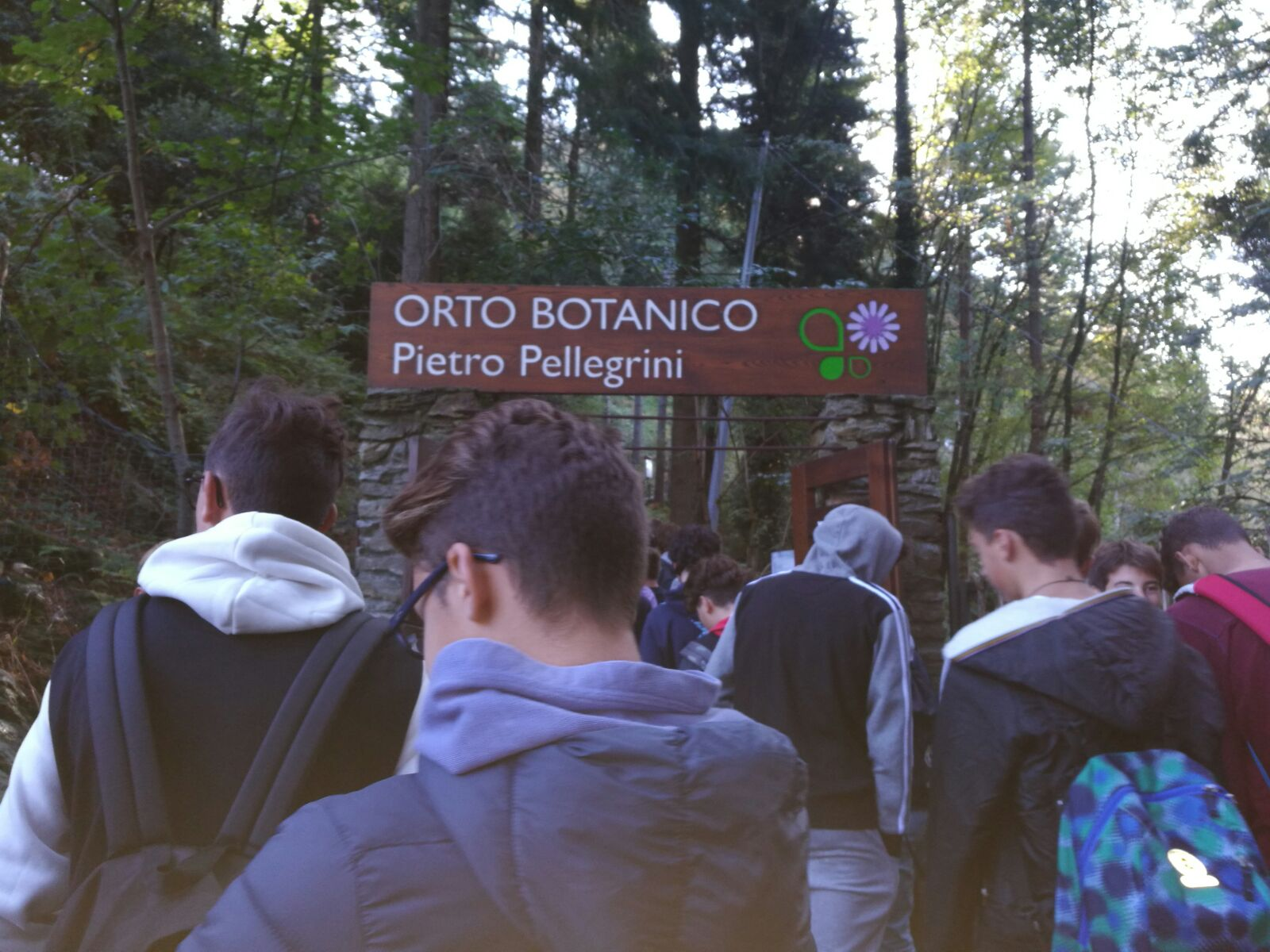
Orto Botanico delle Alpi Apuane Pellegrini-Ansaldi

The Orto Botanico delle Alpi Apuane "Pellegrini-Ansaldi" (3 hectares (7.4 acres)), also known as the Orto Botanico di Pian della Fioba and, until 2016, Orto Botanico delle Alpi Apuane "Pietro Pellegrini", is a nature preserve and botanical garden located at 900 meters altitude in Pian della Fioba, Massa, Province of Massa-Carrara, Tuscany, Italy. It is operated by the town in collaboration with the Università della Toscana.

The garden was established in 1966 for the study of plants indigenous to the Apuane Alps and dedicated to botanist Pietro Pellegrini (1867–1957). It was officially opened to the public in 1981. and, although most of its vegetation is spontaneous, it contains a man-made pond for wetland species, as well as experimental trees, mostly conifers, and a collection of chestnut trees (Castanea sativa) for study and conservation.

== Species ==
Species include:

- Abies alba
- Acer pseudoplatanus
- Alnus cordata
- Cedrus atlantica
- Chamaecyparis lawsoniana
- Cistus salvifolius
- Digitalis lutea
- Erica arborea
- Fraxinus ornus
- Ostrya carpinifolia
- Phyteuma orbiculare
- Pinus nigra
- Pinus strobus
- Pinus pinaster
- Pseudotsuga menziesii
- Quercus cerris
- Sorbus aria
- Sorbus aucuparia
- Teucrium scorodonia
- Alchemilla xanthochlora
- Astragalus purpureus
- Buphthalmum salicifolium
- Carex macrostachys
- Centaurea ambigua
- Dactylorhiza maculata
- Eleocharis palustris
- Eriophorum latifolium
- Globularia incanescens
- Helianthemum oelandicum
- Hypericum coris
- Leontodon anomalus
- Mentha aquatica
- Moltkia suffruticosa
- Myosotis spp.
- Orchis pauciflora
- Polygala carueliana
- Rhamnus glaucophyllus
- Salix crataegifolia
- Santolina leucantha
- Scabiosa holosericea
- Thesium sommieri
- Veratrum album

Fungi include Boletus granulatus, Cantharellus cibarius, Macrolepiota procera, and Russula virescens.

== See also ==
- List of botanical gardens in Italy
