= Fornas =

Fornas is a surname. Notable people with the surname include:

- Josep Fornas (1924–2021), Spanish politician
- Roger Fornas (born 1982), Spanish basketball player

== See also ==
- Forna, another surname
