= Bobbio Cathedral =

Cathedral in Bobbio, Italy

Coordinates: 44.767142°N 9.387889°E

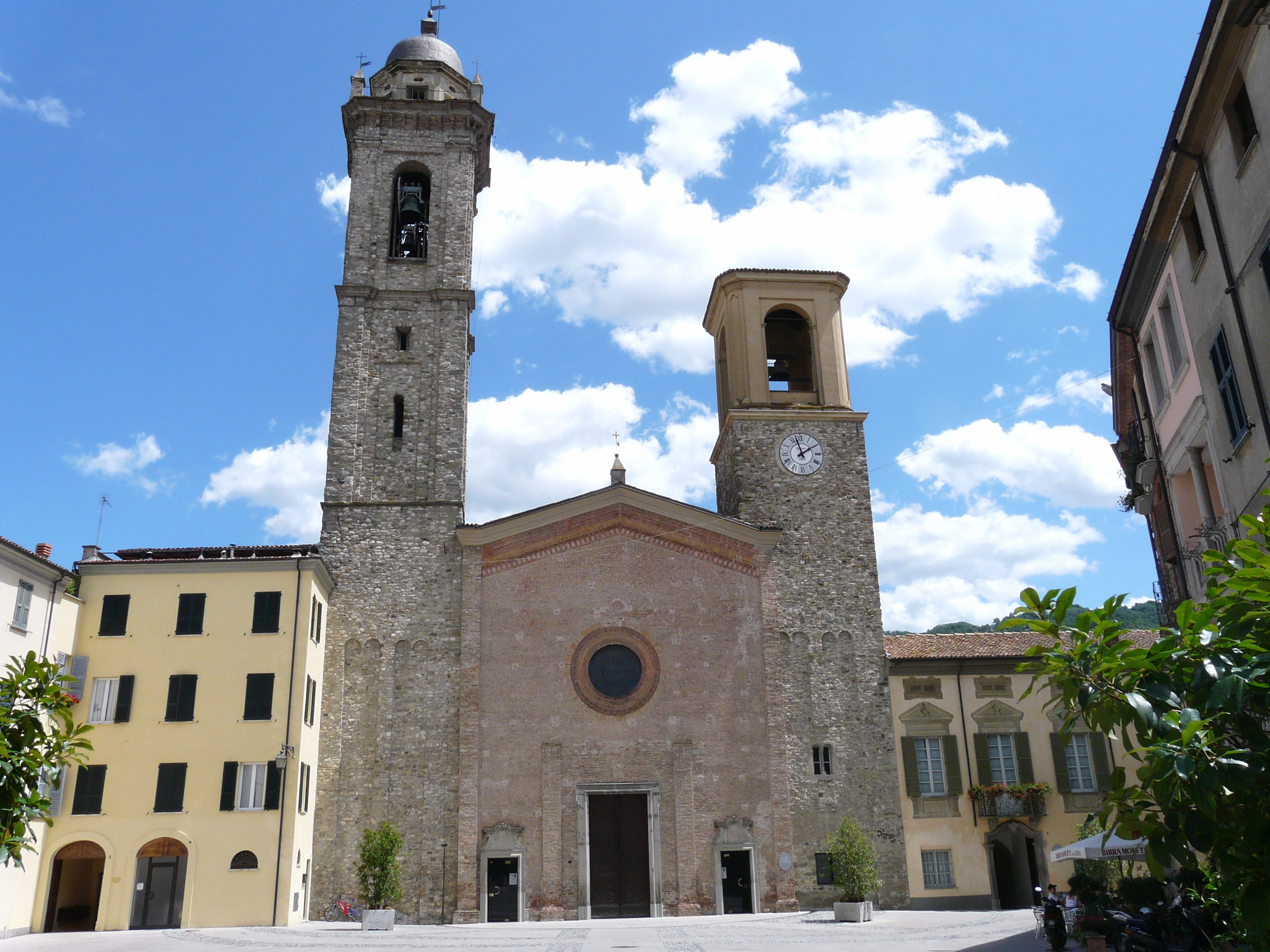
Bobbio Cathedral

Bobbio Cathedral (Italian: Duomo di Bobbio; Concattedrale di Santa Maria Assunta) is a Roman Catholic cathedral in Bobbio, Emilia-Romagna, Italy, dedicated to the Assumption of the Virgin Mary. Formerly the episcopal seat of the Diocese of Bobbio, it became in 1986 a co-cathedral of the Archdiocese of Genova, then in 1989 a co-cathedral of the Diocese of Piacenza-Bobbio.

== See also ==
- Catholic Church in Italy
