= Forno (Massa) =

Frazione in Messa, Tuscany, Italy

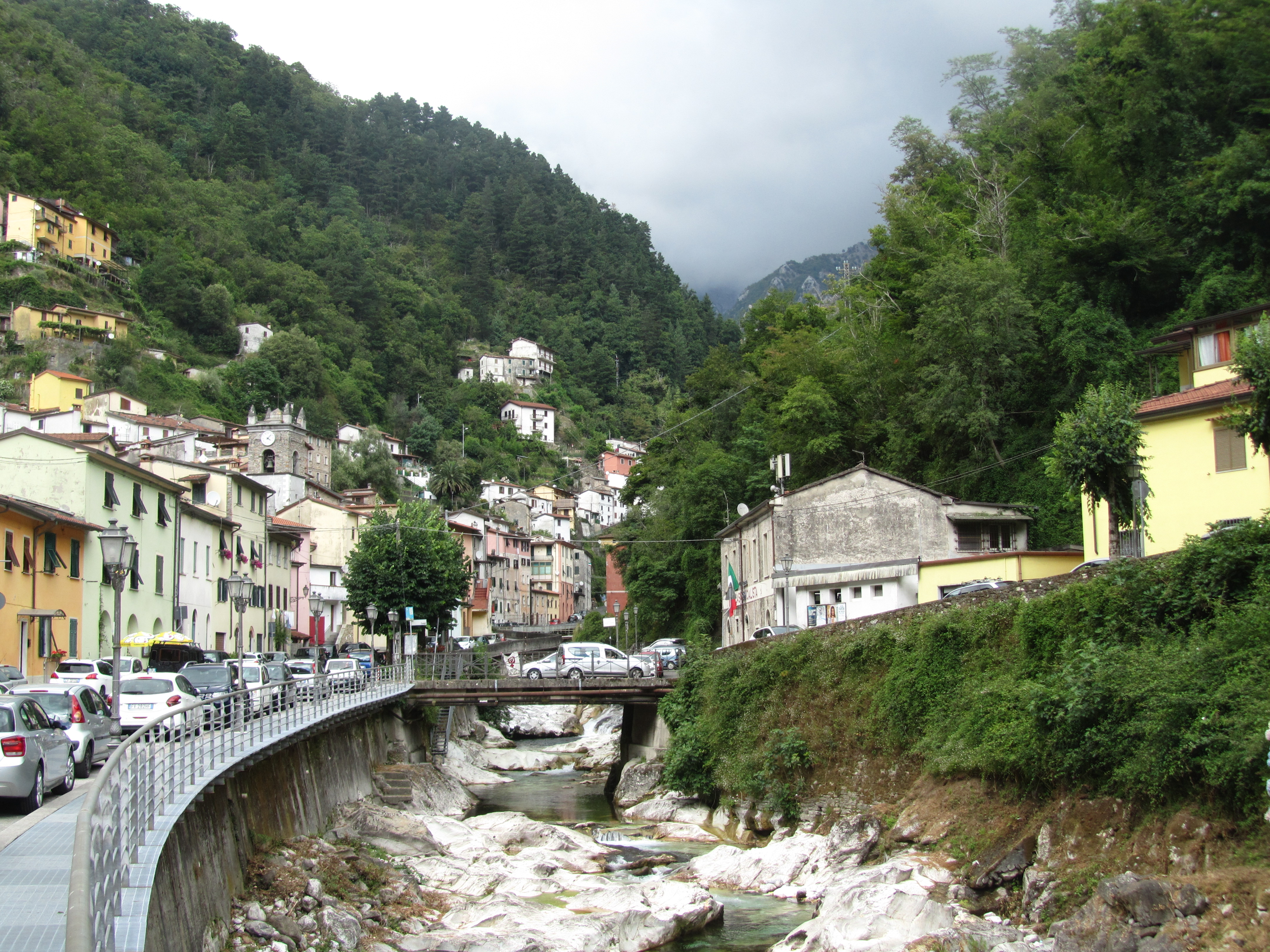
- A picture of the village
- Interactive map of Forno
- Country: Italy
- Region: Tuscany
- Municipality: Messe
- Frazione: Forno

Population
  - Total: 796
- Postal codes: 54100, 54030, 54034

Forno is a frazione of the municipality of Massa in Tuscany, Italy.

== Geography ==
Forno is localed in the valley of the Frigido River, adjanet to the Apuan Alps, 7.3 km north-east of Massa.

== History ==
=== Stone age ===
The earliest evidence of human presence in the narrow valley of the Frigido River, at the foot of the Apuan Alps, dates back to the Neolithic period.

=== Medieval era ===
The modern layout of the village and its name (Forno, meaning "furnace") derive from ironworking factories that processed ore extracted from the surrounding mines, which were active by the XIII century. The combination of rich mineral deposits and the hydraulic power generated by the springs of the Frigido River fostered a pre-industrial manufacturing axis along the valley floor, interspersed with small populated settlements. The initial development of the site occurred on the river's right bank around Rocca Frigida, a fortress built atop an isolated hill to guard the river. The oldest part of the village expanded in a fan shape along the slope below the fortress, characterized by narrow alleys and stone houses. Notable structures from this early era include the Church of San Pietro Apostolo (built before 1322) and the former Casa dei Leggi (House of the Leggis) Situated along Via Vecchia, believed to have served as the original seat of the local municipality.

=== Modern period ===
Between the 14th and 16th centuries, the settlement expanded further along the riverbank to maximize water power for iron foundries. By the late 16th century, Forno had grown into a small township of 509 inhabitants, equipped with a church, a hospital, a tavern, and a road network that included the Ponte all'Indugio (built in 1598). During this period, the village became a favored location for the summer residence of Prince Alberico I Cybo-Malaspina, an influence of his passage is still visible in several local houses featuring graffito plasterwork, as well as numerous historic water mills along the river.

=== Contemporary period ===
During the 17th and 18th centuries, the local iron industry suffered a severe crisis brought on by extensive deforestation, which depleted the timber needed to fuel the smelters. In response, the local economy pivoted toward two new major industries; Forno developed into a prominent manufacturing center, eventually operating eight hat factories. Products were sold throughout the Italian peninsula and exported abroad, using premium materials imported from Egypt, France, Sicily, and other contemporary regions of Italy. Marble quarrying in the nearby mountains intensified toward the end of the 18th century and expanded significantly by the mid-19th century following improvements to the mountain road network. In the late 19th century, the expansion of the marble and textile industries prompted a major urban reorganization. Drawing inspiration from 19th-century philanthropy and British "Industrial Villages," planners established an integrated industrial settlement designed to house and support approximately 1,000 workers and their families. The centerpiece of this development was La Filanda, a modern cotton-spinning mill constructed near the springs of the Frigido River on the site of an 18th-century iron foundry. To support the workforce, the project included specialized housing, such as the Palazzo Operaio (Worker's palace) and the Casa Socialista (Socialist House) along Via del Commercio, as well as social services and a nursery for workers' children. However, unlike some British models aimed at improving worker welfare, the integrated setup also functioned as a mechanism for labor control, leveraging the combined offer of housing and employment.

On 13 June 1944, the village was the site of a Nazi-fascist massacre, which took place following the reconquest by the Italian Social Republic after it had been occupied just four days earlier by partisan forces led by "Tito" which, prior to its collapse, proclaimed the Free Republic of Forno. German SS units, together with detachments of the Xª MAS distinguished themselves by their cruelty and fierceness, torturing prisoners (both partisans and civilians) and taking part in the execution by firing squad of 68 people. Among those executed by firing squad was the Maresciallo ordinario of the local Carabinieri station, Ciro Siciliano, recipient of the Gold Medal for Civil Valor.

In 1985, the ruined Filanda building underwent a complete restoration. Today, it serves as the Visitors' Center and Documentation Center for the Apuan Alps Regional Park (Parco Regionale delle Alpi Apuane).

== Monuments ==
- Church of San Pietro Apostolo
- Indugio Bridge
- Filanda di Forno

== Related articles ==
- Free Republic of Forno
