= Italian partisan republics =

Former provisional state entities in Italty

Flag of the National Liberation Committee.

The Italian Partisan Republics or Free Zones were the provisional state entities created by Italian partisans in areas liberated from the joint Nazi-Fascist occupation (or temporarily free for other reasons) in the summer of 1944, during the Second World War. Located in mountainous and hilly territories of Northern Italy (along the arc of the Alps and the Northern Apennines), they were universally short-lived, with most of them being reconquered by the Wehrmacht within weeks of their formal establishments and re-incorporated into the Italian Social Republic.

== Description ==
It was an overall phenomenon of areas that had been liberated by the partisans or had found themselves temporarily free from the rule and occupation of Nazi Germany and the Italian Social Republic for various reasons, and which have been managed and administered in different forms: either by real "Governments", either by the partisan groups themselves, or by autonomous institutions, always inspired by the creation of a democratic experience.

Some of them had the time to produce a relatively structured administrative organization and legislative norms whose principles later passed into the Italian Constitution.

== List of Italian Partisan Republics ==
- Republic of Alba (10 October – 2 November)
- Republic of Alto Monferrato (September – 2 December)
- Republic of Alto Tortonese (September – December)
- Republic of Bobbio (7 July – 27 August)
- Republic of the Cansiglio (July–September)
- Republic of Carnia (26 September – 10 October)
- Republic of Corniolo (2 February – March 1944)
- Republic of Oriental Friuli (30 June – September)
- Free Republic of Forno (9 June – 13 June 1944)
- Republic of Pigna (IM) (18 September 1944 – 8 October 1944)
- Republic of the Langhe (September – November)
- Republic of Montefiorino (17 June – 1 August)
- Republic of Ossola (10 September – 23 October)
- Republic of Torriglia (26 June – 27 November)
- Republic of the Ceno Valley (10 June – 11 July)
- Republic of the Enza Valley and the Parma Valley (June–July)
- Republic of the Maira Valley and the Varaita Valley (June–21 August)
- Republic of the Taro Valley (15 June–24 July)
- Republic of the Lanzo Valley (25 June–September)
- Republic of the Sesia Valley (11 June–10 July)
- Republic of Varzi (19/24 September–29 November)

== See also ==
- Italian resistance movement
- Italian Social Republic
- Italian campaign (World War II)
- German-occupied Europe
