= Forni =

Forni may refer to:

== Geography ==
=== Italy ===
- Forni Avoltri, Province of Udine
- Forni di Sopra, Province of Udine
- Forni di Sotto, Province of Udine
- Forni Dolostone, a dolomite geological formation in northeastern Italy

== See also ==
- Forni (surname), people surnamed Forni
- Forno (disambiguation)
