= Malaspina Castle =

Castle in Massa, Italy

Coordinates: 44.032224°N 10.14603°E

- Rocca Malaspina (Italian)
- Malaspina
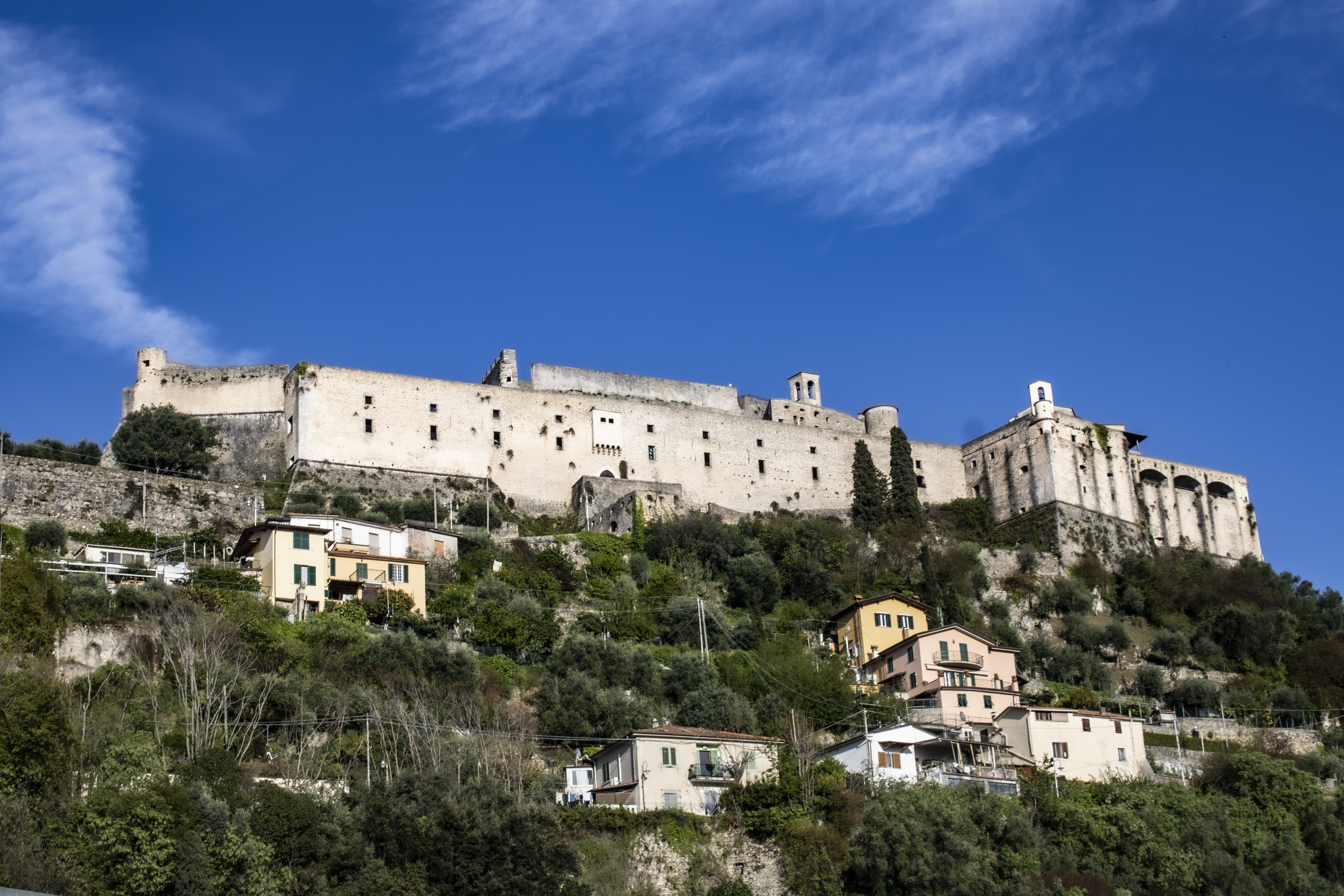
- Malaspina Castle as it appears 2023
- Interactive map of Malaspina Castle
- Type: Hillfort
- Periods: medieval
- Region: Tuscany
- Nearest city: Massa

The Malaspina Castle is located in Massa, Italy. It crowns the top of a rocky hill and dominates the wide underlying plain and part of the Tyrrhenian coast. From the 17th century the main purpose of the castle was military and it served as a prison until 1946. The castle was subsequently restored and reopened to the public.

== History ==
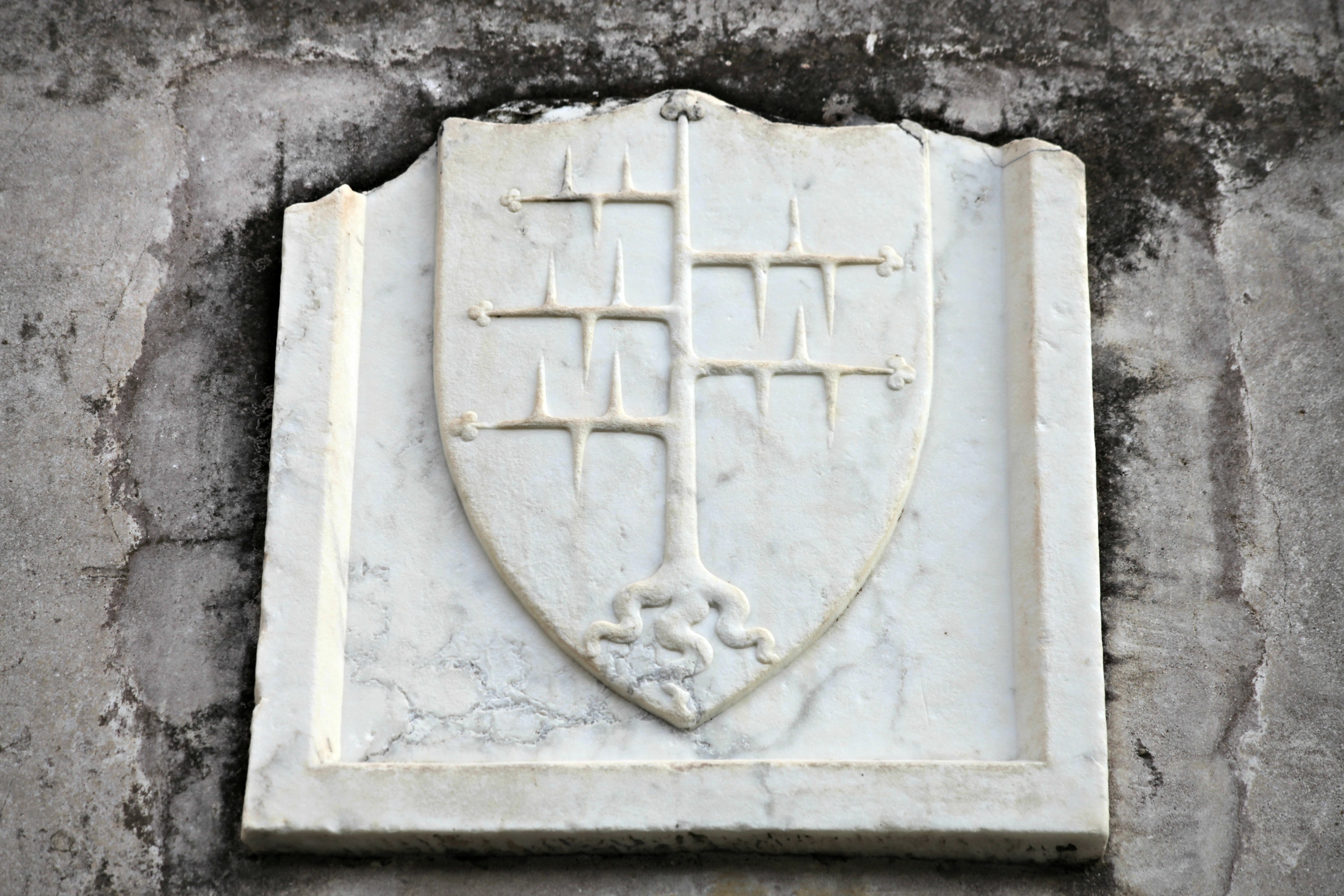
Coat of arms of the Spino Secco branch of the family, Malaspina Castle "Rocca Malaspina"

The first record of a castle here dates back to 1164. In 1269 because of political discords with local inhabitants it was leveled to the ground by the army of the nearby city of Lucca. The castle became the seat of the Malaspina family, marquises of Massa. It was visited by Dante Alighieri, who supposedly envisioned the descending circles of Hell, that inspired the corresponding part of his Divine Comedy. According to legend, Dante saw the great funnel-shaped cave lying below, surrounded by a series of ledges with the slopes converging to the stream.

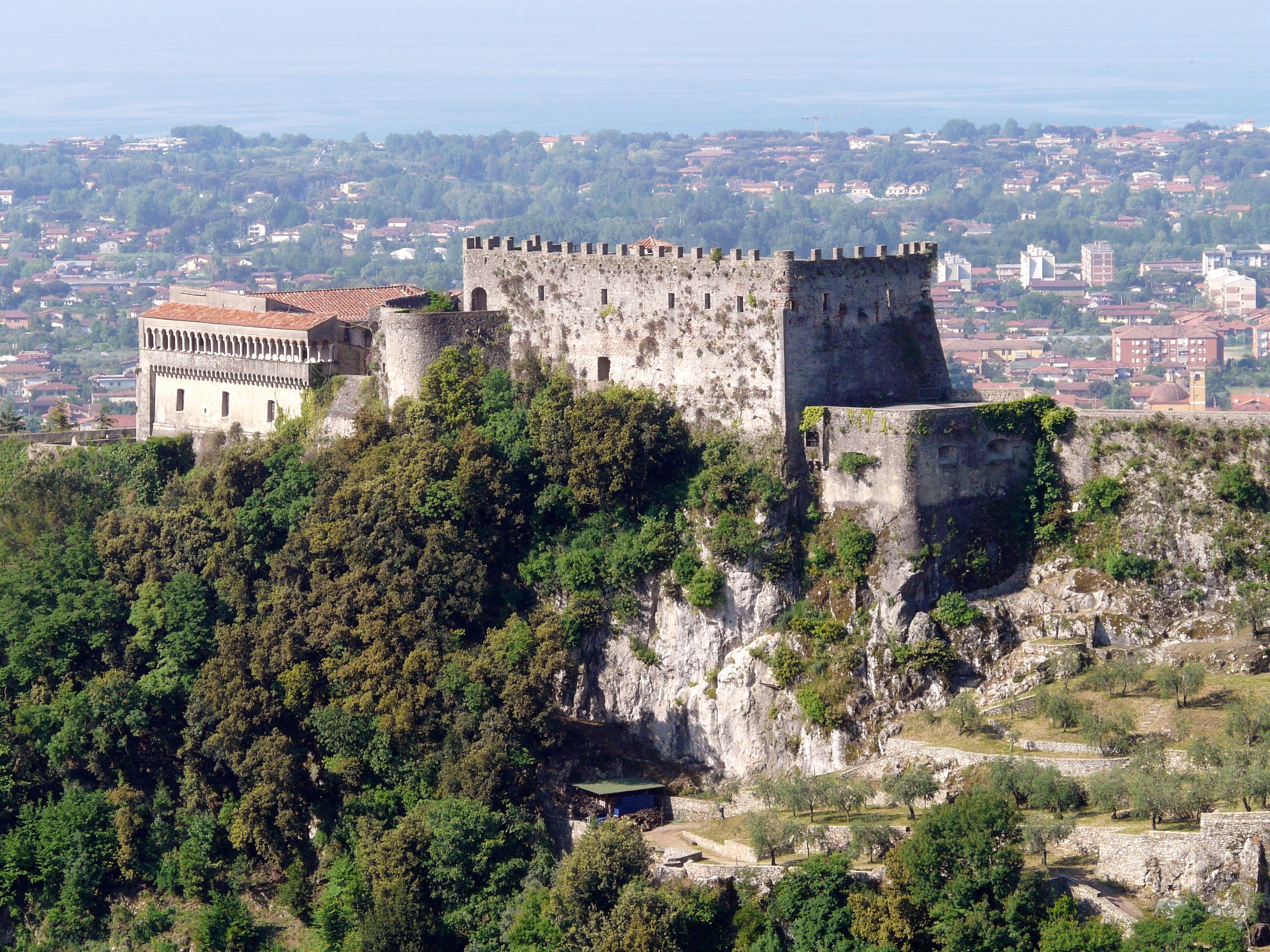
The Castle
