= Forno =

Forno is an Italian and Portuguese word meaning "oven". It may refer to several places:

Italy

- Forno (Massa), a hamlet of Massa, in the Province of Massa and Carrara, Tuscany
- Forno (Moena), a hamlet of Moena, in the Province of Trento, Trentino-Südtirol
- Forno (Rocca Santa Maria), a hamlet of Rocca Santa Maria, in the Province of Teramo, Abruzzo
- Forno Canavese, a municipality of the Province of Turin, Piedmont
- Forno di Zoldo, a municipality of the Province of Belluno, Veneto

Portugal

- Forno, a locality of Santa Bárbara, Vila do Porto municipality, Azores
- Forno, a locality of Aguada de Cima, Águeda municipality, Centro Region

It is also a surname and may refer to several people:

- Henry Forno (1798–1866), American military officer
- Gaetano Pace Forno (1809–1874), Maltese clergyman
- Enzo Del Forno (born 1950), Italian athlete

== See also ==
- Al forno
- Forni (disambiguation)
