= Free Republic of Forno =

Partisan republic during World War II

- Capital: Forno

Establishment
  - Established: 9 June 1944
  - Abolished: 13 June 1944

Population
  - Estimate: 4000

The Free Republic of Forno was an italian partisan republic established on 9 June 1944, which lasted up until 13 June 1944, surviving for roughly four days. It was located in Forno and its adjacent areas. The republic was abolished through force by the combined forces of the Italian Social Republic and Nazi Germany which pursued the Massacre of Forno.

== History ==
On 9 June 1944 the Italian partisans, numbered between 200–300 lightly armed, managed to liberate the village of Forno under the leadership of partisan Marcello Garosi, also known by his partisan name "Tito". The Free Republic of Forno was established on the same day by the Italian resistance movement. The partisans saw a member of the Carabinieri, marshal Ciro Siciliano, defect to their resistance group, cooperating with the newly established republic.

During their brief control, they arrested local Fascists, attacked Republican Fascist military installations in Massa, secured the desertion of several Italian fascist soldiers, and negotiated the release of political prisoners through hostage exchanges; The occupation also attracted deserters from Fascist armed forces in nearby provinces. After reviewing their circumstances, the partisans located in the town came to the conclusion that the republic was militarily untenable, thus, Massa's National Liberation Committee, repeatedly ordered the evacuation of the village between 10 and 12 June. Despite these warnings, the withdrawal was delayed. Despite the CLN ordering the partisans to withdraw from the village, the village was desperately fortified by the local partisan division, using land mines and through the organization of patrols and a military intel division. The partisans eventually decided to program a withdrawal between 12 June 1944 and 13 June 1944, but this never happened due to a delay.

On 13 June 1944, as a reprisal for the creation of the republic and other acts by the partisans in the area, Nazis of the 135th Brigade and the fascists of the Decima MAS of the Italian Social Republic, under the command of Umberto Bertozzi killed 68 locals in what would be known as the Massacre of Forno, and militarily abolished the republic. Partisan commander Marcello Garosi was killed during the fighting and was later posthumously awarded Italy's Gold Medal of Military Valor.

== Demographics ==
When the Free Republic was established, the local population was an estimated amount of 4000 people.

== Analysis ==
Historians have suggested that the partisans' decision to remain in Forno reflected both strategic misjudgments and internal disagreements within the Luigi Mulargia partisan formation.
