= Massa, Tuscany =

Massa Masa (Emilian)
- Comune
- Comune di Massa
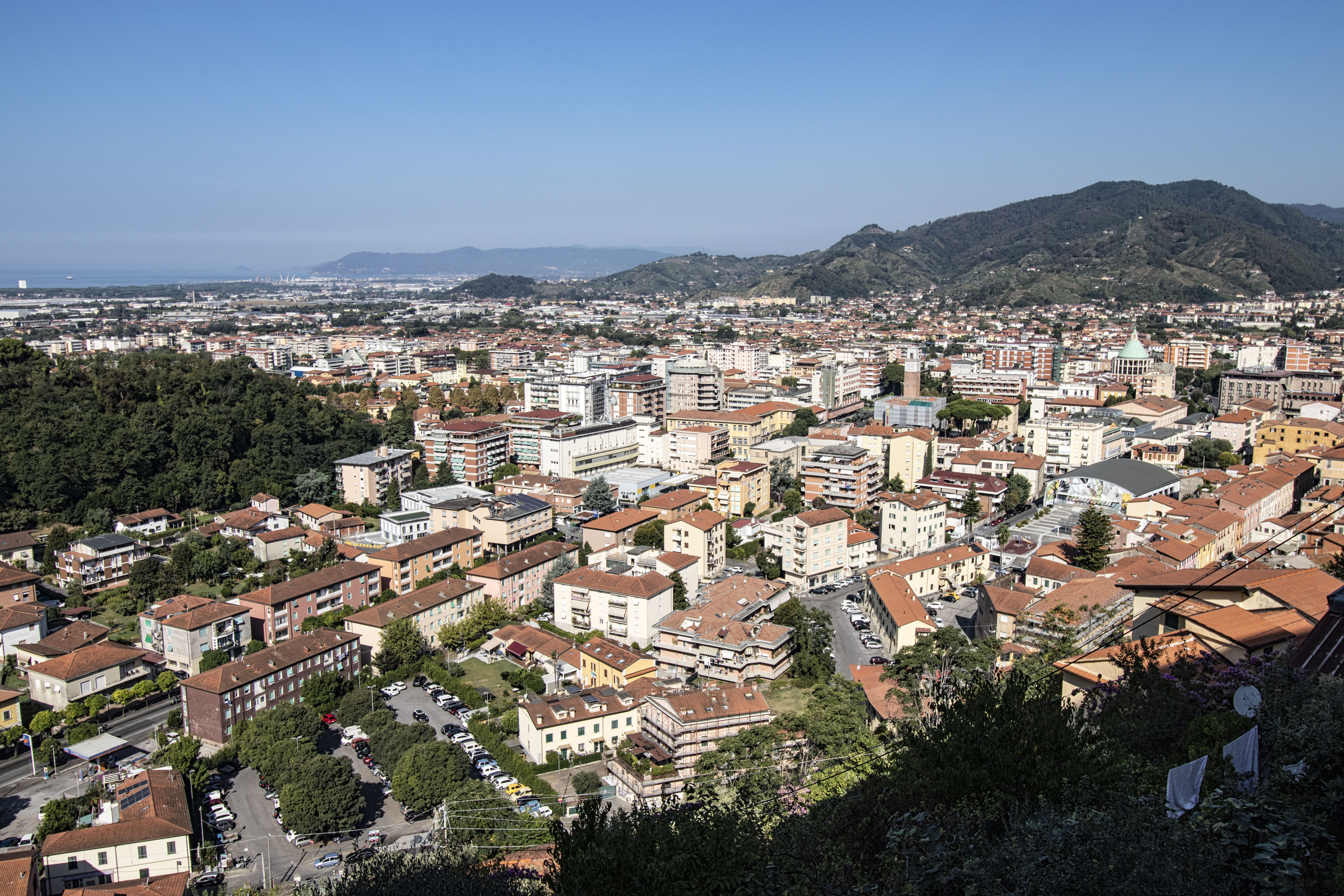

- Flag Coat of arms

- Massa within the province of Massa and Carrara

- Location within Italy Location within Tuscany
- Coordinates: 44°02′N 10°08′E
- Country: Italy
- Region: Tuscany
- Province: Massa and Carrara (MS)
- Frazioni: see list

Government
  - Mayor: Francesco Persiani (Centre-right)

Area
  - Total: 94.1 km^{2} (36.3 sq mi)
- Elevation: 65 m (213 ft)

Population (30 September 2017)
  - Total: 68,946
  - Density: 733/km^{2} (1,900/sq mi)
- Demonym: Massesi
- Time zone: UTC+1 (CET)
  - Summer (DST): UTC+2 (CEST)
- Postal code: 54100
- Dialing code: 0585
- Patron saint: St. Francis of Assisi
- Saint day: October 4
- Website: Official website

Massa (Italian: [ˈmassa]; Emilian: Masa) is a town and comune in Tuscany, central Italy, the administrative centre of the province of Massa and Carrara. It is located in the Frigido River Valley, near the Alpi Apuane, 5 km (3 mi) from the Tyrrhenian Sea.

== History ==
Massa is mentioned for the first time in the Tabula Peutingeriana, a 2nd-4th century AD itinerary, with the name ad Tabernas frigidas, referring perhaps to a stage on the Via Aemilia Scauri consular road from Pisa to Luni.

From the 15th to the 19th century, Massa was the capital of the independent Principate (later Duchy) of Massa and Carrara, ruled by the Malaspina and Cybo-Malaspina families. Massa is the first recorded town in Europe in which the magnetic needle compass was used in mines to map them and determine the extent of various mine owners' properties.

In 1829 the states were inherited by Francis IV, Duke of Modena. In 1859, during the unification of Italy process, it joined the Kingdom of Sardinia.

== Geography ==
Located in south of the province, near the borders with the Province of Lucca, Massa is a coastal town by the Tyrrhenian Sea. The municipality borders with Carrara, Fivizzano, Minucciano (LU), Montignoso, Seravezza (LU), Stazzema (LU) and Vagli Sotto (LU).

=== Frazioni ===
Massa counts several hamlets (frazioni): Altagnana, Alteta, Antona, Baita, Bargana, Bergiola, Bondano, Borgo del Ponte, Bozzone, Ca' di Cecco, Caglieglia, Campareccia, Canevara, Capaccola, Casania, Casette, Casone, Castagnara, Castagnetola, Castagnola, Cervara, Cinque Vie, Ciremea, Codupino, Cupido, Forno, La Gioconda, Gotara, Gronda, Grondini, Guadine, Le Iare, Lavacchio, Marina di Massa, Mirteto, Monte Pepe, Ortola, Pariana, Partaccia, Pian della Fioba, Poggi, Poggiolo, Poggioletto, il Ponte, Poveromo, Poveromo Macchie, Pratta, Puliche, Quercioli, Redicesi, Remola, Resceto, Ricortola, Rinchiostra, Rocca, Romagnano, Ronchi, San Carlo Terme, San Cristoforo, San Leonardo, San Lorenzo, Santa Lucia, Il Santo, Sei ponti, Turano, Vergheto, Le Villette, Volpigliano, Zecca.

== Demographics ==
Historical population

Year	Pop.	±%
1861	15,319	—
1871	17,853	+16.5%
1881	19,780	+10.8%
1901	26,118	+32.0%
1911	30,484	+16.7%
1921	34,370	+12.7%
1931	39,722	+15.6%
1936	41,819	+5.3%

Year	Pop.	±%
1951	50,441	+20.6%
1961	56,988	+13.0%
1971	62,922	+10.4%
1981	65,687	+4.4%
1991	66,737	+1.6%
2001	66,769	+0.0%
2011	68,856	+3.1%
2021	66,498	−3.4%

Source: ISTAT

== Economy ==
The Massa area is of high touristic value and also hosts a concentration of some 600 industrial and craft activities, located within the so-called Apuan Industrial Zone, with a direct employment of more than 7,000 people. Together with the twin town of Carrara, Massa is known for the extraction and production of marble.

== Main sights ==
Massa's sights include:

- Malaspina castle (15th century), overlooking the city from a hill
- Ducal Palace, Renaissance palace on the Piazza Aranci
- The Cathedral
- Piazza degli Aranci
- Piazza Mercurio
- Marina di Massa
- Diocesan Museum
- Guglielmi theatre
- Pamphili manor
- Orto Botanico delle Alpi Apuane "Pietro Pellegrini" is a mountain botanical garden maintained by the city.

== Transport ==
Buses

Consorzio Apuano Trasporti, also known as CAT, was the company that, since 1 January 1969, managed the local public transport by road in the province of Massa-Carrara. CAT went bankrupt in 2009 and was taken over by Autolinee Toscana Nord ATN. On 1 February 2015 ATN leased its management branch, vehicles, staff and facilities to CTT Nord until the end of the contract for the local public transport of the Tuscany. CTT Nord together with VaiBus in 2017 extended its stay as a concessioner of ATN until 31 December 2019, from 1 January 2020 leased its management branch to RATP Dev, a company of the French RATP group, awarding the contract for local public transport by road of the Tuscany Region.

Train

Massa Centro railway station, opened in 1862, forms part of the Pisa–La Spezia–Genoa railway.

Motorway

The city is connected to Autostrada A12 and the national highway "SS 1 Aurelia".

Airport

Massa-Cinquale Airport (IATA: QMM, ICAO: LILQ) is a general aviation airport located in the neighboring village of Cinquale.

Tramway

From 1890 to 1932 Massa counted on a railway line from Marina to Forno and, from 1922 to 1975, a monorail serving a marble quarry named Lizza di Piastreta.

== Sister cities ==
Massa is twinned with:

- Bad Kissingen, Germany, since 1960
- Vernon, France,
- Nowy Sącz, Poland, since 2007

== Climate ==
Climate data for Massa (1991–2020)
Month	Jan	Feb	Mar	Apr	May	Jun	Jul	Aug	Sep	Oct	Nov	Dec	Year
Mean daily maximum °C (°F)	12.9 (55.2)	13.7 (56.7)	16.3 (61.3)	18.8 (65.8)	23.2 (73.8)	26.6 (79.9)	29.2 (84.6)	29.9 (85.8)	26.2 (79.2)	22.1 (71.8)	16.7 (62.1)	13.1 (55.6)	20.7 (69.3)
Daily mean °C (°F)	8.9 (48.0)	9.1 (48.4)	11.8 (53.2)	14.4 (57.9)	18.5 (65.3)	22.0 (71.6)	24.5 (76.1)	25.0 (77.0)	21.4 (70.5)	17.8 (64.0)	13.1 (55.6)	9.4 (48.9)	16.3 (61.4)
Mean daily minimum °C (°F)	4.9 (40.8)	4.6 (40.3)	7.2 (45.0)	9.9 (49.8)	13.8 (56.8)	17.5 (63.5)	19.9 (67.8)	20.1 (68.2)	16.6 (61.9)	13.5 (56.3)	9.5 (49.1)	5.6 (42.1)	11.9 (53.5)
Average precipitation mm (inches)	106 (4.2)	96 (3.8)	87 (3.4)	99 (3.9)	73 (2.9)	64 (2.5)	40 (1.6)	44 (1.7)	117 (4.6)	171 (6.7)	182 (7.2)	131 (5.2)	1,210 (47.7)
Average precipitation days (≥ 1.0 mm)	8.2	7.6	8.0	9.4	6.8	5.7	3.1	3.8	7.2	9.4	11.7	10.2	91.1
Source: Consorzio LaMMA

== Sources ==
- Menziani, Alberto (2011). "Massa dall'Unità d'Italia alla Prima Guerra Mondiale: mezzo secolo di stori urbanistica o la nascita della città contemporanea". Atti e Memorie della Deputazione di storia patria per le antiche provincie modenesi. pp. 261–300.
