= Forni (surname) =

Forni is an Italian surname. It may refer to:

- Cesare Forni (1890–1943), Italian fascist politician
- Efrem Forni (1889–1976), Italian Roman Catholic cardinal
- Giovanni Forni (athlete) (c. 1920), Italian Olympic tug of war competitor
- Giovanni Forni, Italian mathematician and researcher in the field of dynamical systems
- Giuseppe Forni, Paralympic athlete from Switzerland
- P. M. Forni (Pier Massimo, [1951–2018]), Italian-born academic and author; director of the Civility Project at Johns Hopkins University
- Raffaele Forni (1906–1990), Swiss Roman Catholic archbishop
- Raymond Forni (1941–2008), French socialist politician

== See also ==
- Forni (disambiguation)
