= Monte Penice =

Mountain in Italy

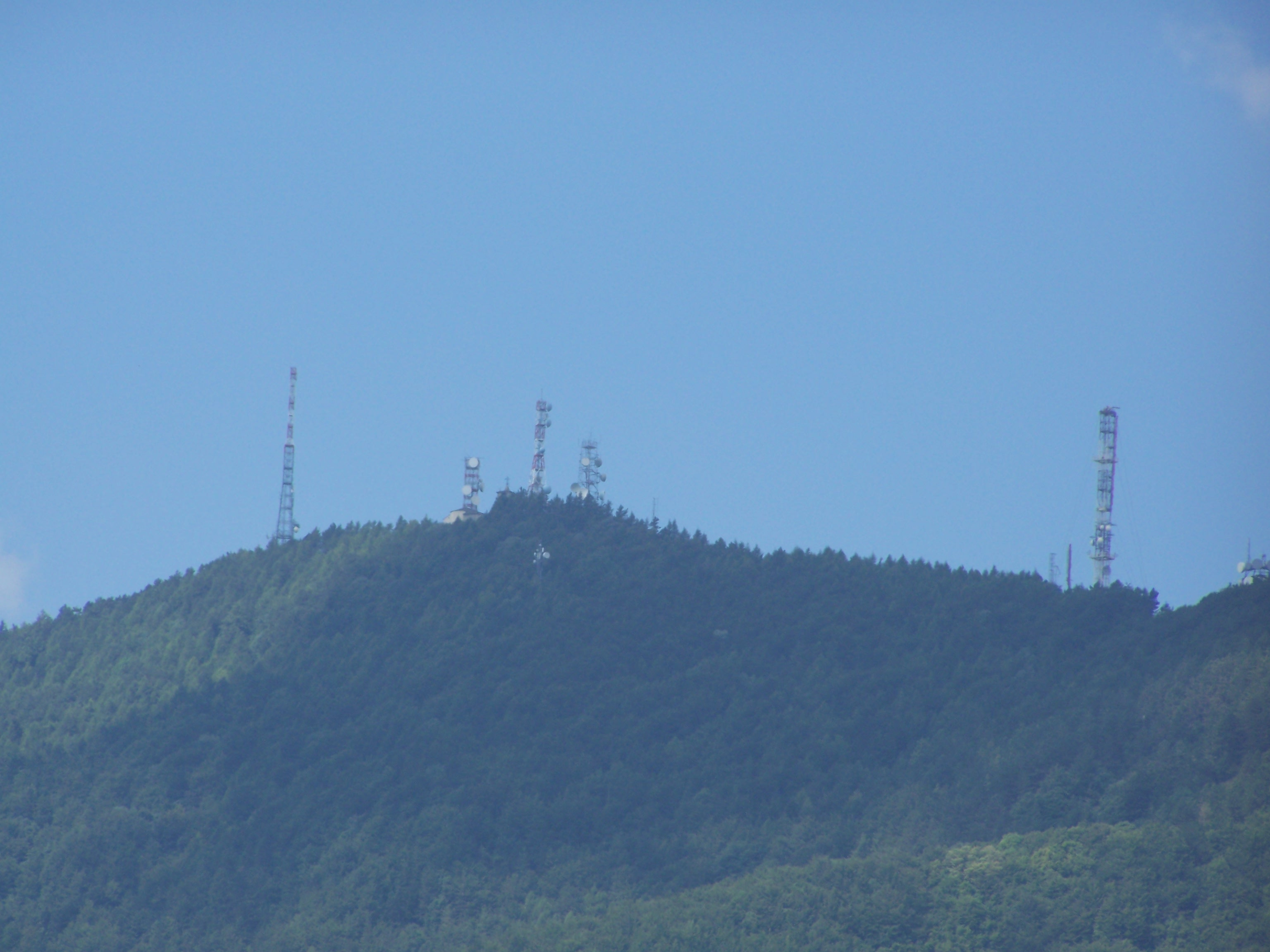

Highest point
- Elevation: 1,460 m (4,790 ft)
- Prominence: 508 m (1,667 ft)
- Coordinates: 44°47′04″N 9°19′01″E

Geography
- Location within Italy
- Location: Lombardy / Emilia-Romagna, Italy
- Parent range: Apennines

Monte Penice is a mountain of Lombardy and Emilia-Romagna in Italy. It has an elevation of 1,460 metres (4,790 ft) above sea level and belongs to the Ligurian Apennines.

== See also ==
- Parcellara Stone
