= Radoslav Kratina =

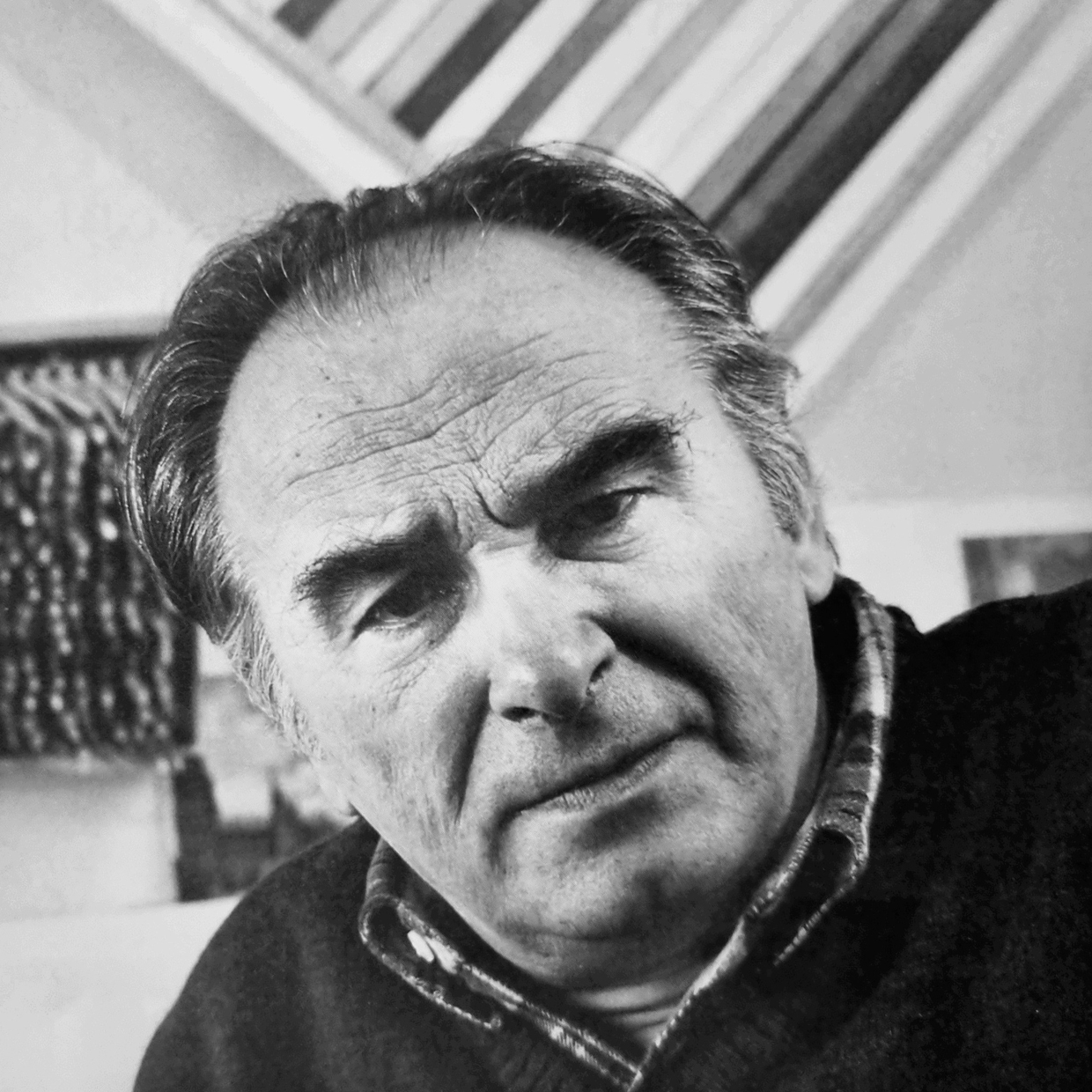
- Radoslav Kratina in 1979
- Born: 2 December 1928; Brno, Czechoslovakia
- Died: 10 September 1999 (aged 70); Prague, Czech Republic
- Education: Academy of Arts, Architecture and Design in Prague
- Known for: Designer, painter, sculptor
- Spouse: Helena Křížová
- Website: www.radoslavkratina.cz

Radoslav Kratina (2 December 1928 – 10 September 1999) was a Czech graphic and industrial designer, photographer, painter, curator and sculptor. His work, based on rational thinking and a materialistic conception of the world, is rarely unified and focused. Kratina's works, for which he found stimuli in the real world, are among the most authentic manifestations of Czech neoconstructivism of the 1960s and combine contemporary constructive and kinetic tendencies with an existential dimension. With his original and pioneering work he established himself on the international scene during the 1960s. After the Soviet occupation in 1968 and during the following normalization, he lost the opportunity to exhibit and his works, created in isolation, were only discovered after the fall of the communist regime in 1989.

The variability of his artefacts is consistent with the concept of open work as formulated by Umberto Eco in the 1960s. This space of postmodern freedom no longer has binding directions of development, and Kratina's variabils, in their conception, which Arsén Pohribný classifies as a stream of "irrational geometry", go beyond the common understanding of the artwork.

== Life ==
Radoslav Kratina was born on 2 December 1928 in Brno. He studied at the School of Arts and Crafts in Brno from 1943 to 1948 and after graduation worked as a textile designer. From 1952 he continued his studies at the Academy of Arts, Architecture and Design in Prague, first in the studio of graphic designer and painter Josef Novák (1952–1953), and later with Prof. Alois Fišárek (1953–1957). In 1955 he married fashion designer Helena Křížová. As his final work, he submitted a set of blueprint patterns for the dividing panels in the interior of a restaurant at the Expo 58 in Brussels From 1957 to 1962 he worked as an industrial designer of textiles and toys (exhibition at ÚLUV in Prague, 1961).

After moving to a new apartment in 1962, he began to work as freelancer. His wife Helena, who worked as a designer at Oděvní tvorba (Clothing Design), was a reliable source of support for him, as she was allowed to travel abroad and partly supported him financially. In the 1960s he participated in several collective exhibitions together with artists who dealt with structural abstraction, lettrism and constructivism. In 1964 he assembled his first variable object from matchsticks.

In 1967, together with Arsén Pohribný and other artists, he co-founded the Club of Concretists and participated in a joint exhibition in Alpbach. The following year he participated in the exhibitions New Sensibility. Crossroads and Guests in Prague and Brno, and between 1968 and 1971 in a series of exhibitions of the Club of Concretists at home and abroad. Kratina acted as secretary and organizer of all the club's activities throughout this time.

After the occupation in 1968, some members of the Club of Concretists emigrated and the club ceased its activities in 1971. Kratina lost the opportunity to exhibit and until 1989 he privately and in isolation developed the possibilities of his transformable objects and wrote accompanying texts in which he tried to interpret his own work as accurately as possible. He himself also photographed various spatial variations of variabils himself. In 1989, at the end of normalization, after a nearly twenty-year pause in Kratina's own exhibitions, Karel Holešovský stated about his variabils: "despite their relevance, their mission is not adequately fulfilled in today's society. . are excluded from more general use in the appreciation of their artistic qualities... a certain lack of understanding is surprising..." (although) Kratina is an internationally recognized artist whose work is maturing into sovereign artistic excellence.

In 1980–1983, in connection with efforts to save the tombstone of Jindřich Štyrský, Kratina created an extensive set of documentary photographs of artistically valuable tombstones in Prague and out-of-Prague cemeteries.

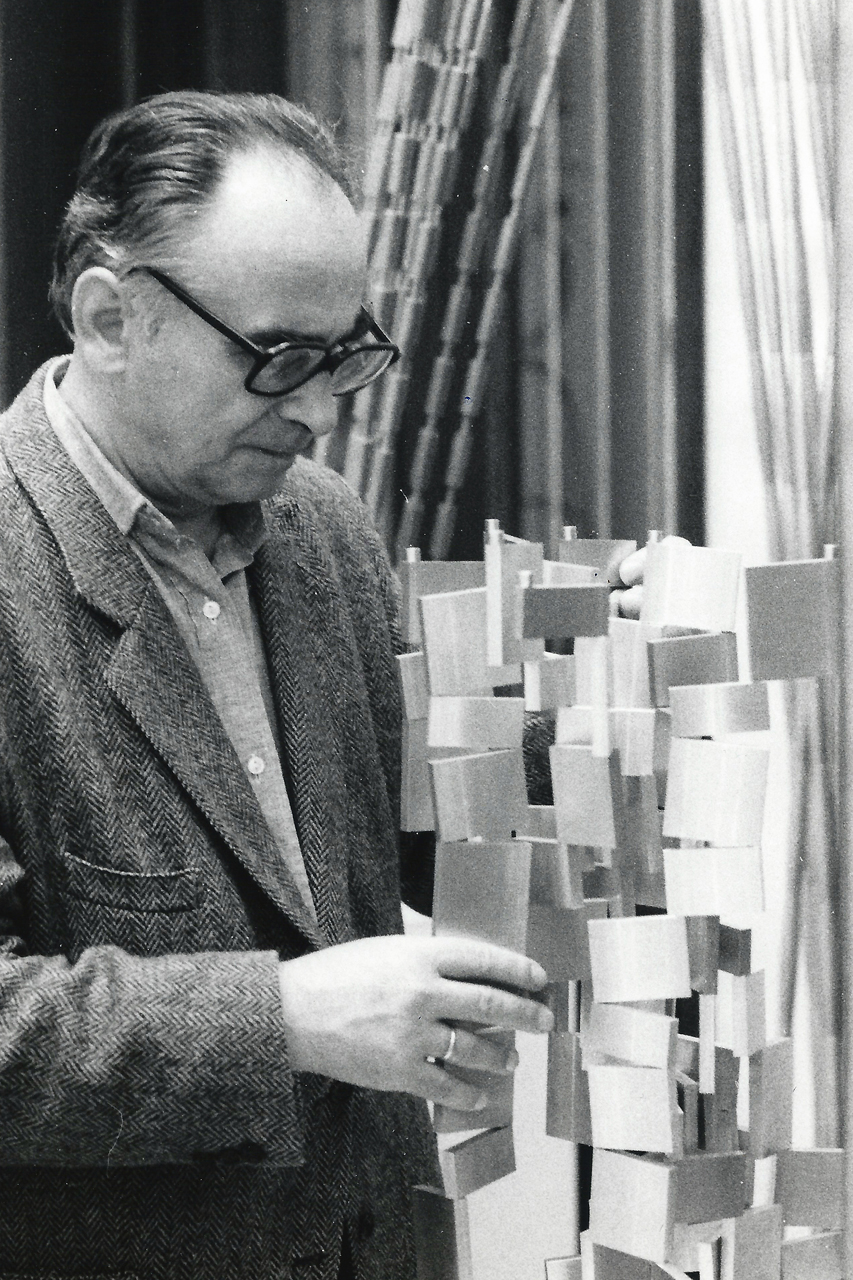
Radoslav Kratina in the 1990s

At the end of normalization in September 1989, before the restoration of the Club of Concretists, he founded the Creative group Geometry. After 1989, the activity of regional associations of the Club of Concretists was resumed, along with exhibitions at home and abroad. Kratina was represented at all major exhibitions covering modern Czech art since the early 1960s and at a number of solo exhibitions in regional galleries and in Prague. Retrospective exhibitions surveying his work in detail were held posthumously in Liberec (2000) and in 2013 at the Prague City Gallery (Stone Bell House). In addition to Arsén Pohribný and Jiří Valoch, Kratina's work has also been studied by Josef Hlaváček, Jan Sekera, Jan Kříž, Karel Holešovský and especially Zbyněk Sedláček, who prepared an inventory of Kratina's work.

Radek Kratina died in Prague on 10 September 1999 as a result of a serious illness.

=== Artistic foundations ===
The manifestations of constructivism and geometric abstraction in Czech art of the 1960s, which Jiří Padrta summarized under the comprehensive designation "New Sensibility", were a reaction to the existential work of artists engaged in structural abstraction (Informel) and New Figuration. The artists drew on the constructivism of the interwar Czechoslovak and European avant-garde (Union of Modern Culture Devětsil, Bauhaus, De Stijl, Abstraction-Création), but they were also familiar with contemporary tendencies, represented by Swiss Constructivism, Kineticism or the Zero group. The new aesthetic was represented by the French movement Les nouveaux réalistes, the GRAV (Groupe de Recherche d'Art Visuel) and Julio Le Parc, the Swiss Richard Paul Lohse, or Heinz Mack, Otto Piene and Günther Uecker of the Zero group. Kratina did not have any direct foreign predecessors, but he appreciated the work of the Israeli artist Yaacov Agam and the Venezuelan Jesús Rafael Soto.

The group of concretists initially formed within the circle of the art groups Křižovatka (Crossroads) - since 1963 and Syntéza (Synthesis) since 1966 and in 1967 founded its own Club of Concretists. The initiator was Radek Kratina together with Tomáš Rajlich, Jiří Hilmar, Miroslav Vystrčil and art theorist Arsén Pohribný. Exhibitions under the title New Sensitivity: Crossroads and Guests were held in 1968 in Brno and Karlovy Vary and in 1969 in Prague Mánes Gallery. Some participants objected to the title of the exhibition because the number of guests was three times the number of members of the Křižovatka group. The Club of Concretists presented itself independently for the first time at exhibitions in Žilina and Prague in 1968. Soon after its foundation, the club grew to 36 permanent members. After the Warsaw Pact invasion of Czechoslovakia, some emigrated and the rest were not allowed to exhibit. The club disbanded after 1970.

== Artwork ==
=== Applied art ===
After graduating from the School of Arts and Crafts in Brno, Radek Kratina devoted himself to textile design in 1949–1952. Here he applied his innate sense of order and harmony in the design of decorative cloth and indigo prints based on the principle of regular geometric patterns. He also designed collections of wooden toys and building blocks.

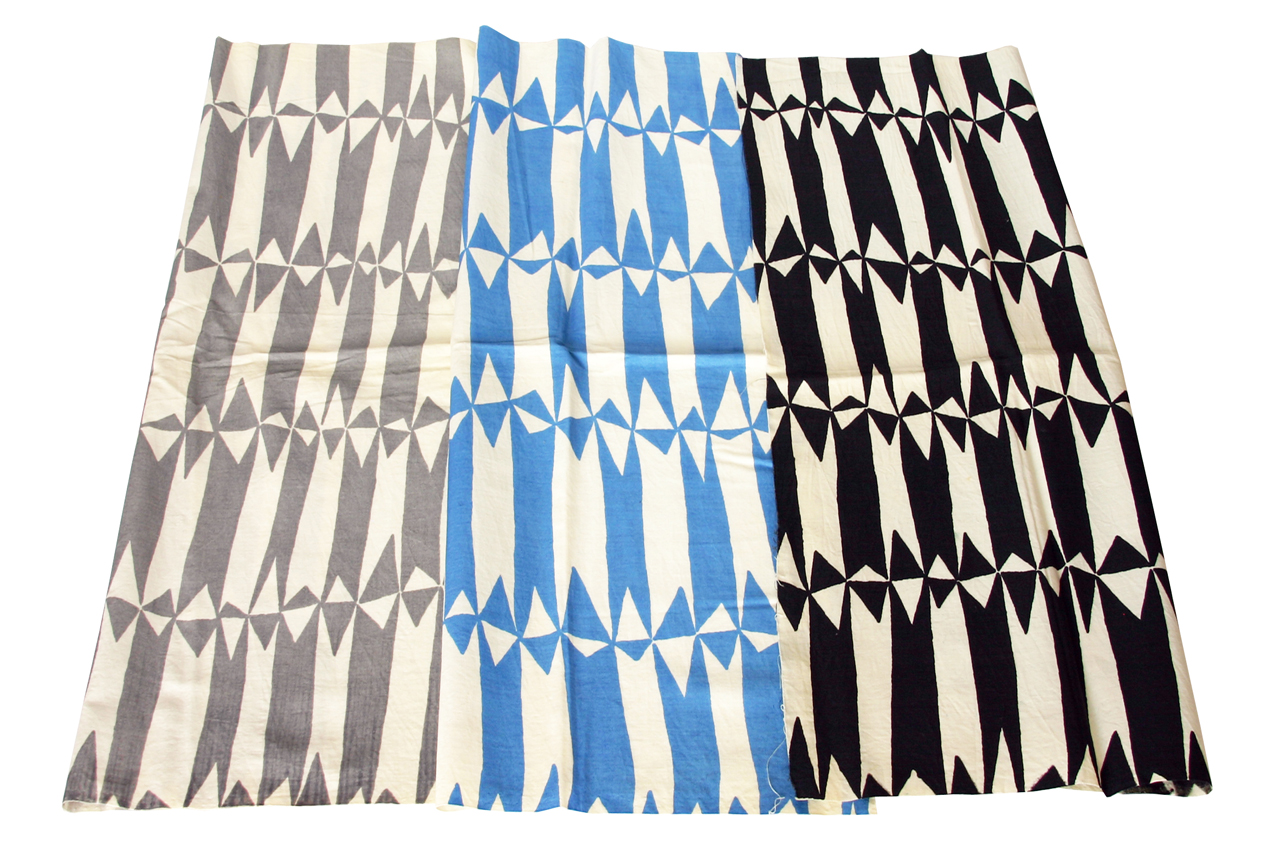
Radoslav Kratina, textile patterns with geometric motifs (1940s–1950s)

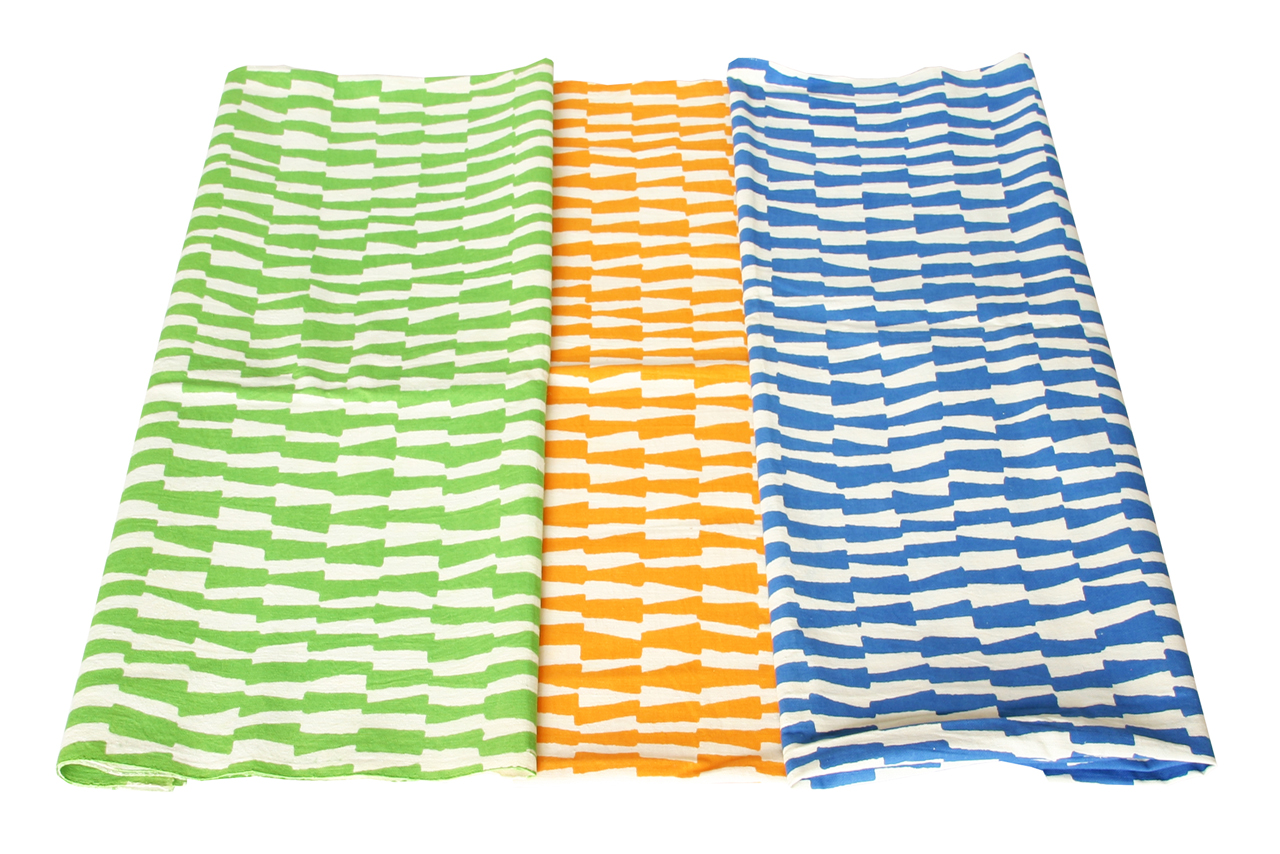
Radoslav Kratina, textile patterns with linear motifs (1940s–1950s)

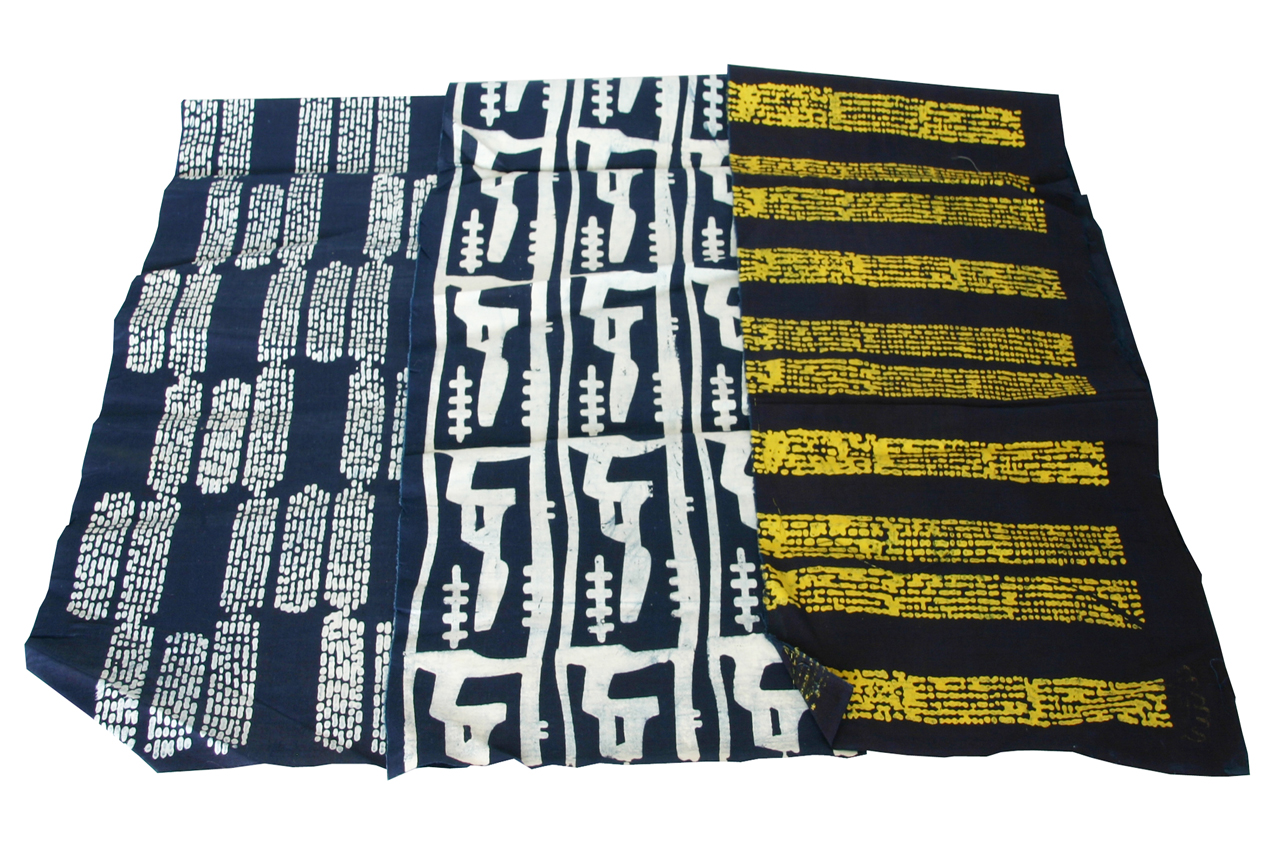
Radoslav Kratina, indigo prints and textile patterns (1940s–1950s)

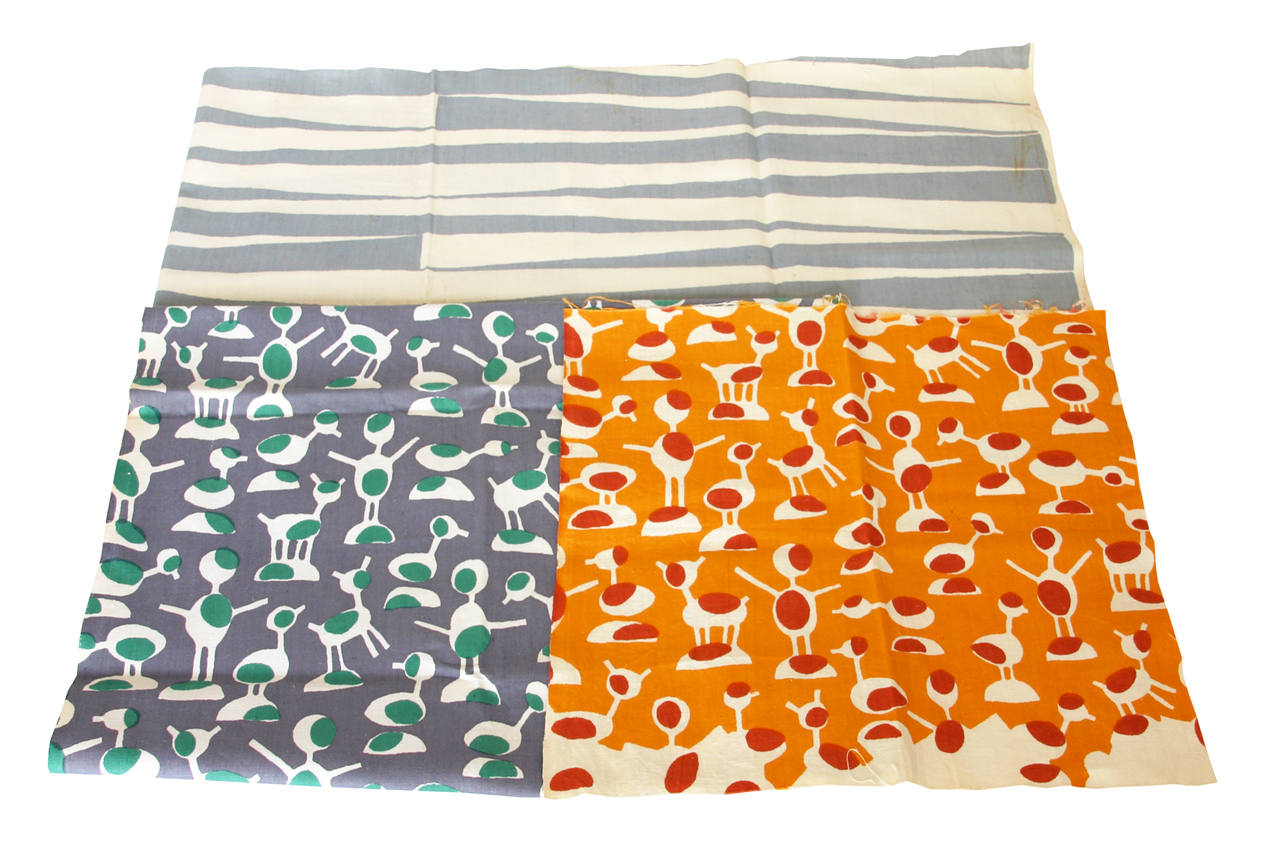
Radoslav Kratina, textile patterns with toy motifs (1950s)

He also worked as a textile designer during his subsequent studies at the Academy of Arts, Architecture and Design in Prague (1952–1957). His graduation work was a textile panneau for a restaurant at the Expo 58 in Brussels, on which he used rubber stamps to create figurative motifs composed of several geometric elements. Kratina's toy designs were inspired by the figures that children assemble from chestnuts and offered a variable combination of individual turned parts. Another series of toys made of flat stylized shapes offered similar transformations.

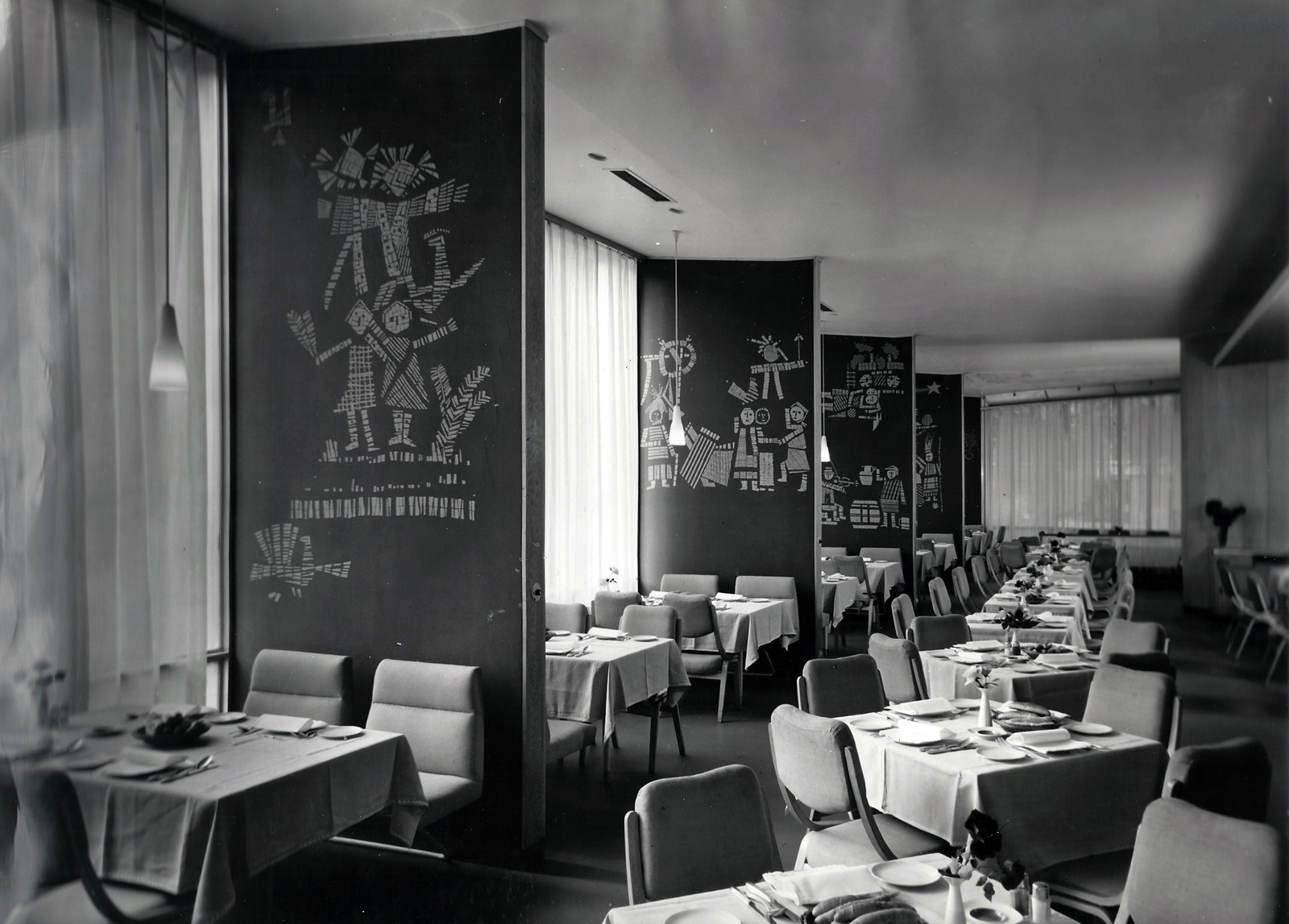
Radoslav Kratina, Panneau with figural motifs, Expo 58 restaurant

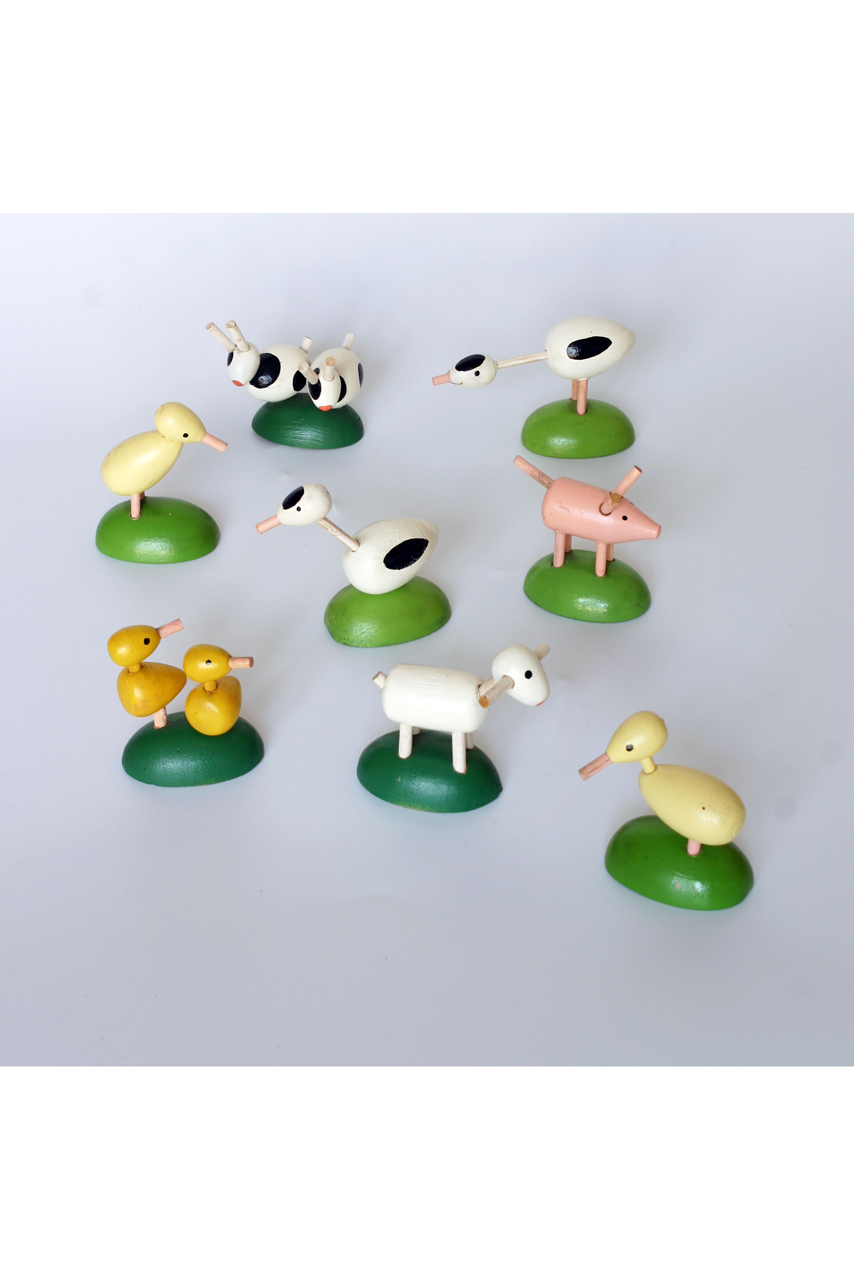
Radoslav Kratina, Children's wooden toys with moving parts (1958)

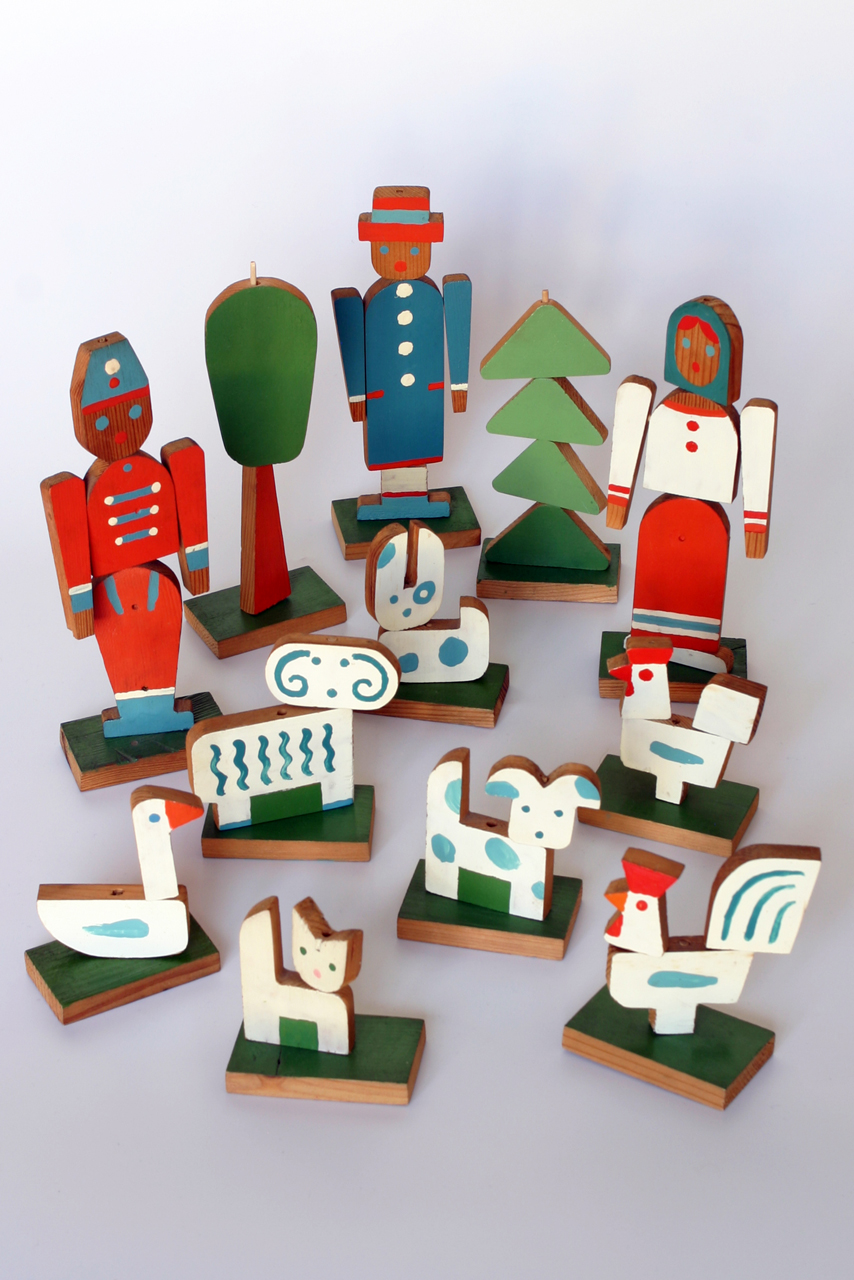
Radoslav Kratina, Children's wooden toys (1958)

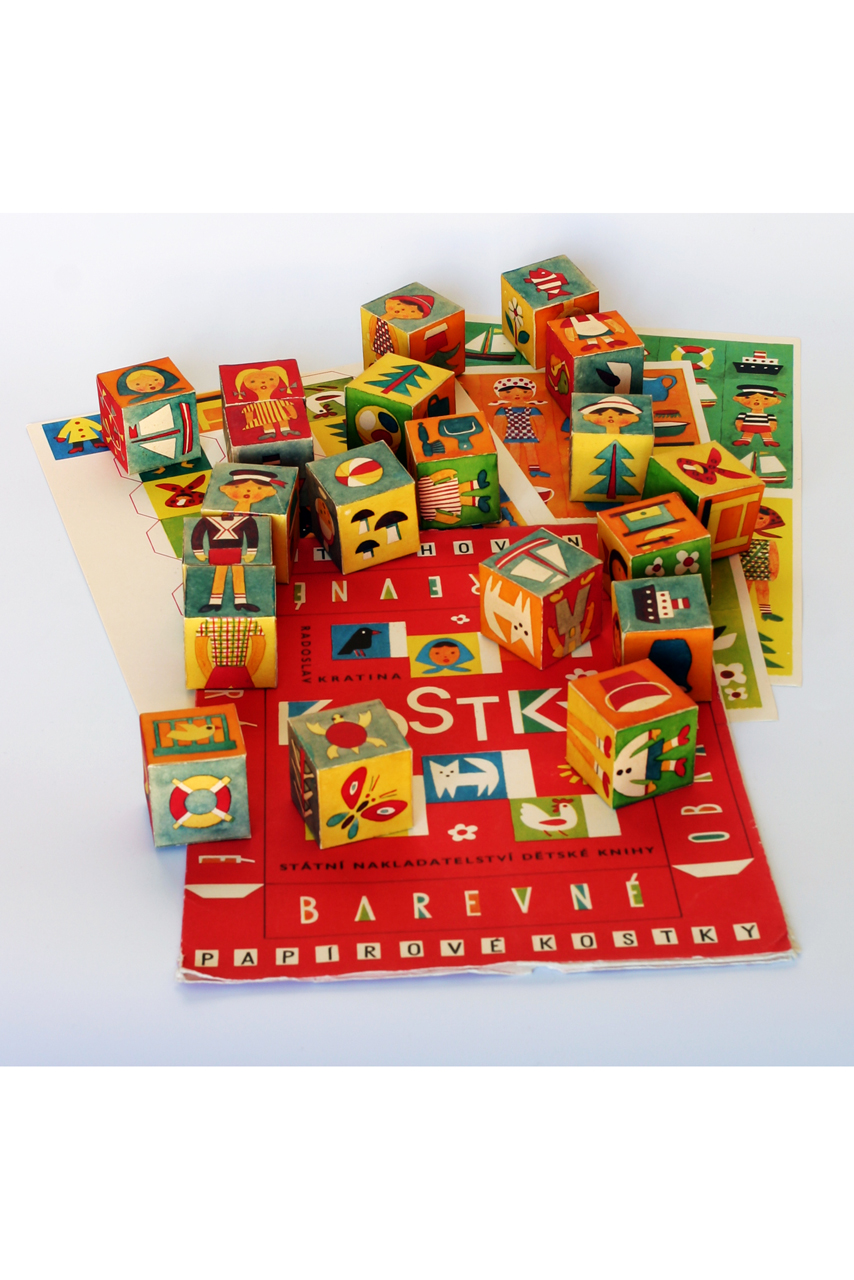
Radoslav Kratina, children's cut-out blocks (1962)

=== 1960s ===
The impulse for his own free creation and abandonment of applied art became the exhibition of his generational friends Rychnov ´63, especially the creators of informel, which attracted him by its unconventional approaches and directness of expression. He was also interested in the graphic experiments of Vladimír Boudník. The exhibition in Rychnov represented a radical and irreversible step for Kratina's move towards the formulation of an uncompromising creative gesture and at the same time a choice of a clear artistic orientation, determined by his need to seize things and to fulfill a sense of concreteness.

Between 1963 and 1965 Kratina devoted himself to oil painting, relief paintings, monotypes, frottage, assemblages, collage and sculptural compositions made of plaster. He used a variety of scrap materials found around his home to make his printmaking matrices and printed the artworks using two rubber cylinders from a hand wringer. He achieved interesting results with objects that could not be rolled with paint directly, but by frottage through the attached flimsy. He experimented with paraffin, loose materials or plaster cast on newsprint. For the creation of lettrist monotypes he reprinted fragments of texts from foreign newspapers and magazines with his own original method, taking advantage of the difference in the absorption of the font colour and the free space of the magazine pages and from the first impression on coated paper he printed a positive so that the typeface could be read again (Reprinting the typeface, 1965).

At the end of the 1960s, he created a set of two-colour prints on handmade paper with repeating geometric elements, and in the 1970s a set of colour serigraphs using a similar principle as Jan Kubíček or Zdeněk Sýkora.

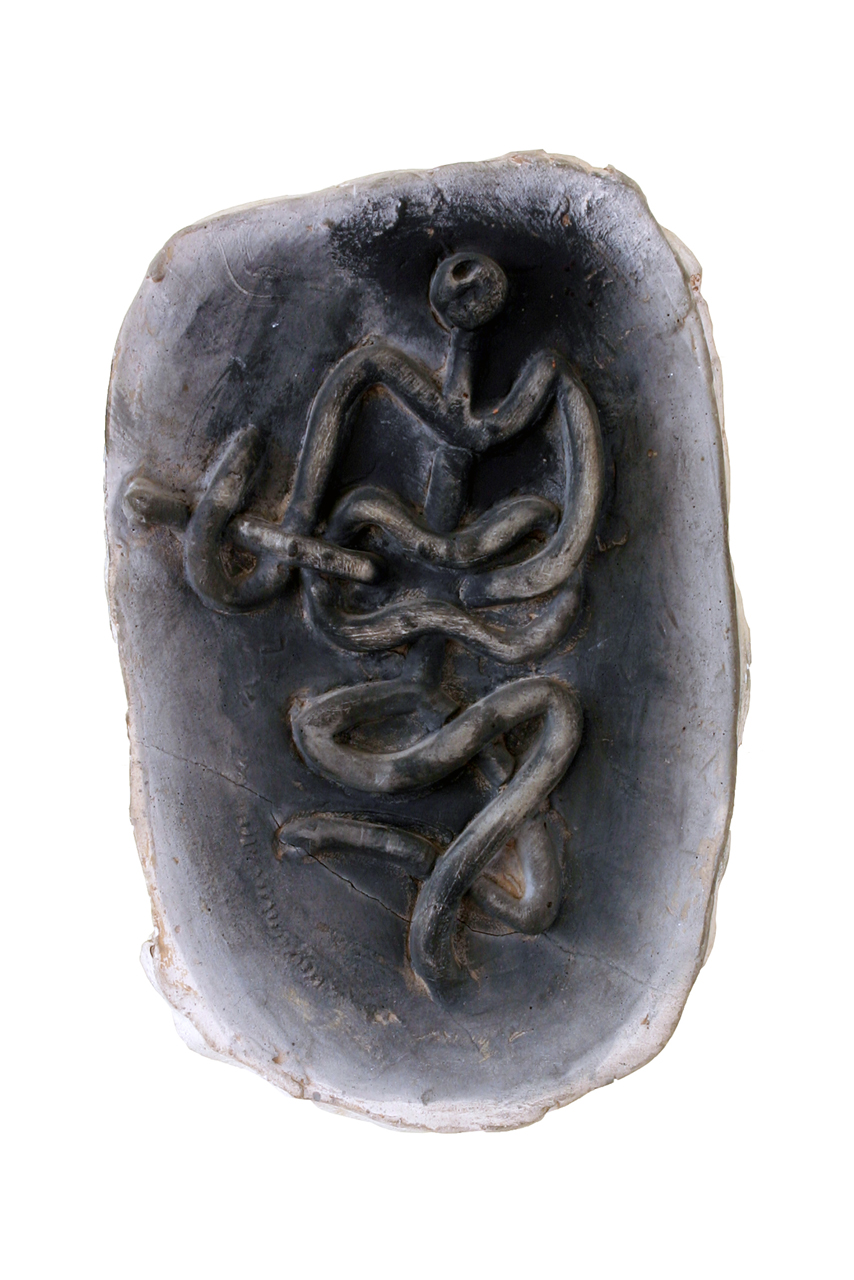
Radoslav Kratina, Figural Relief (1960s)

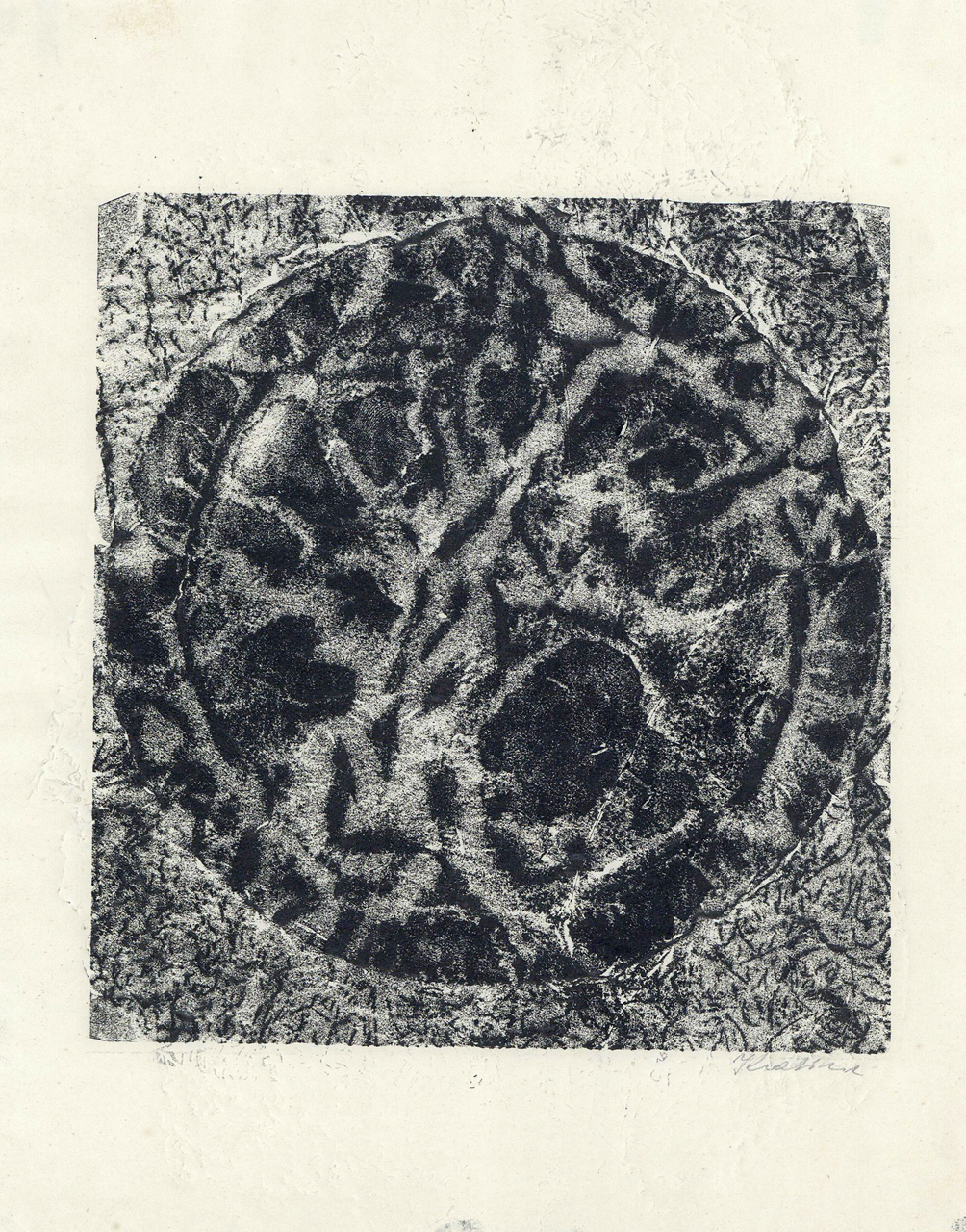
Radoslav Kratina, Frottage II (1960s)

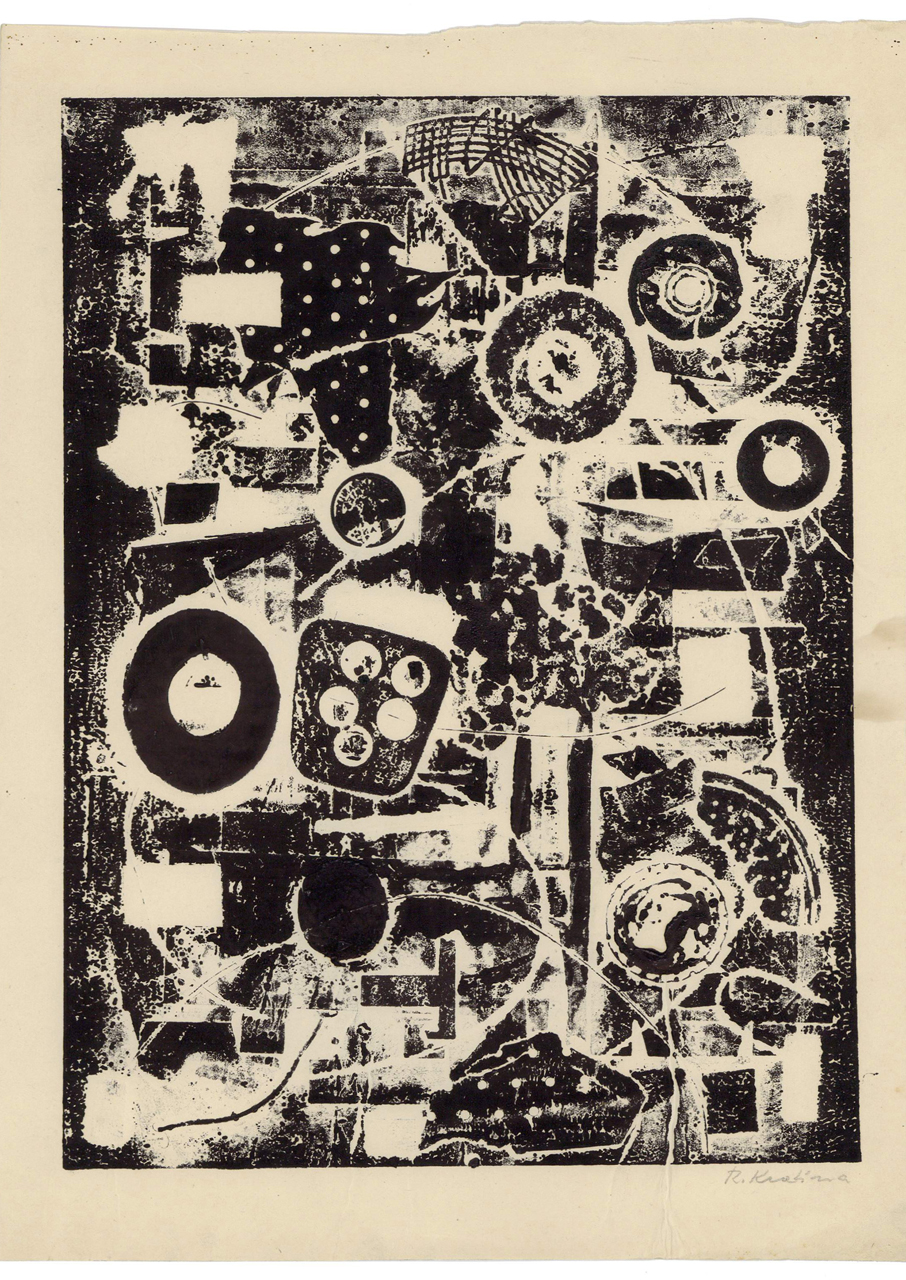
Radoslav Kratina, Impression of relief assemblage (1960s)

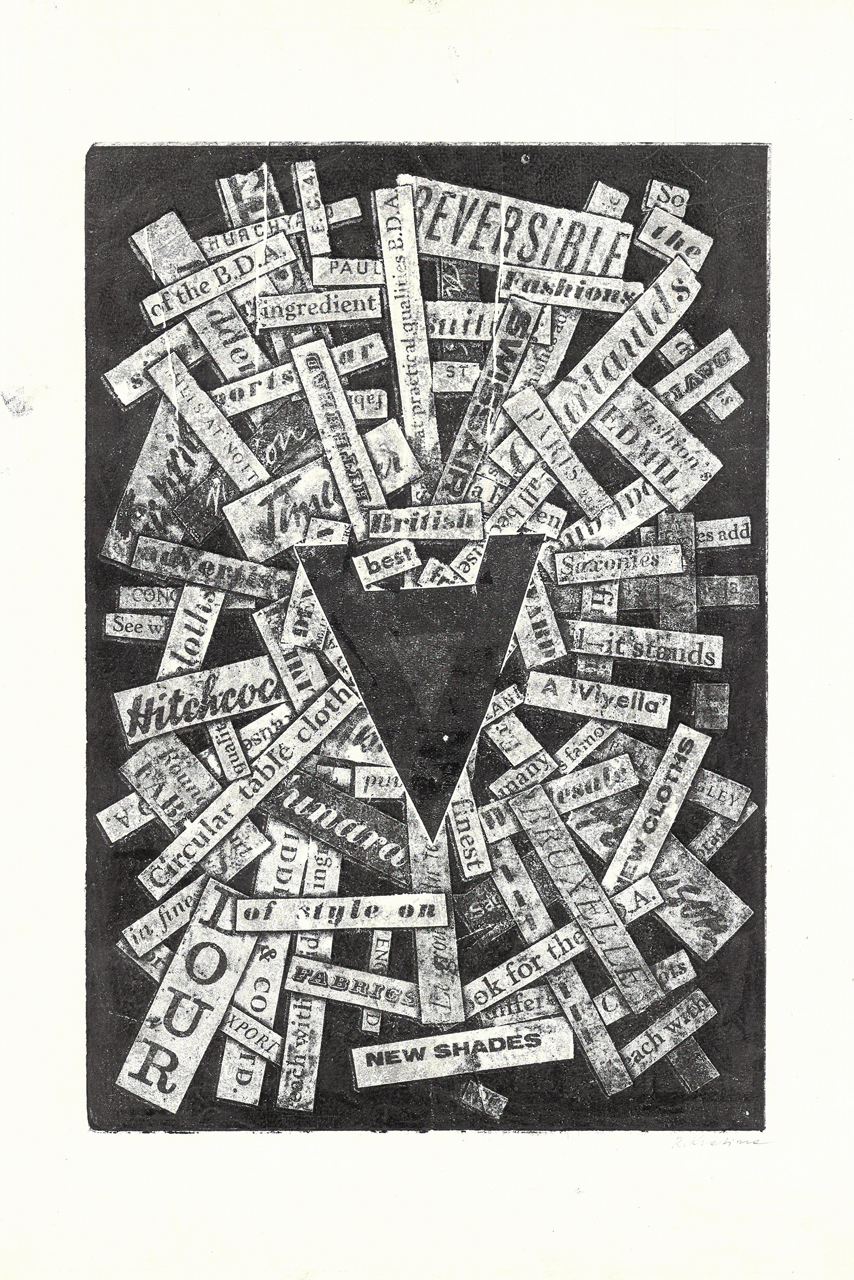
Radoslav Kratina, Font overprint II, monotype (1965)

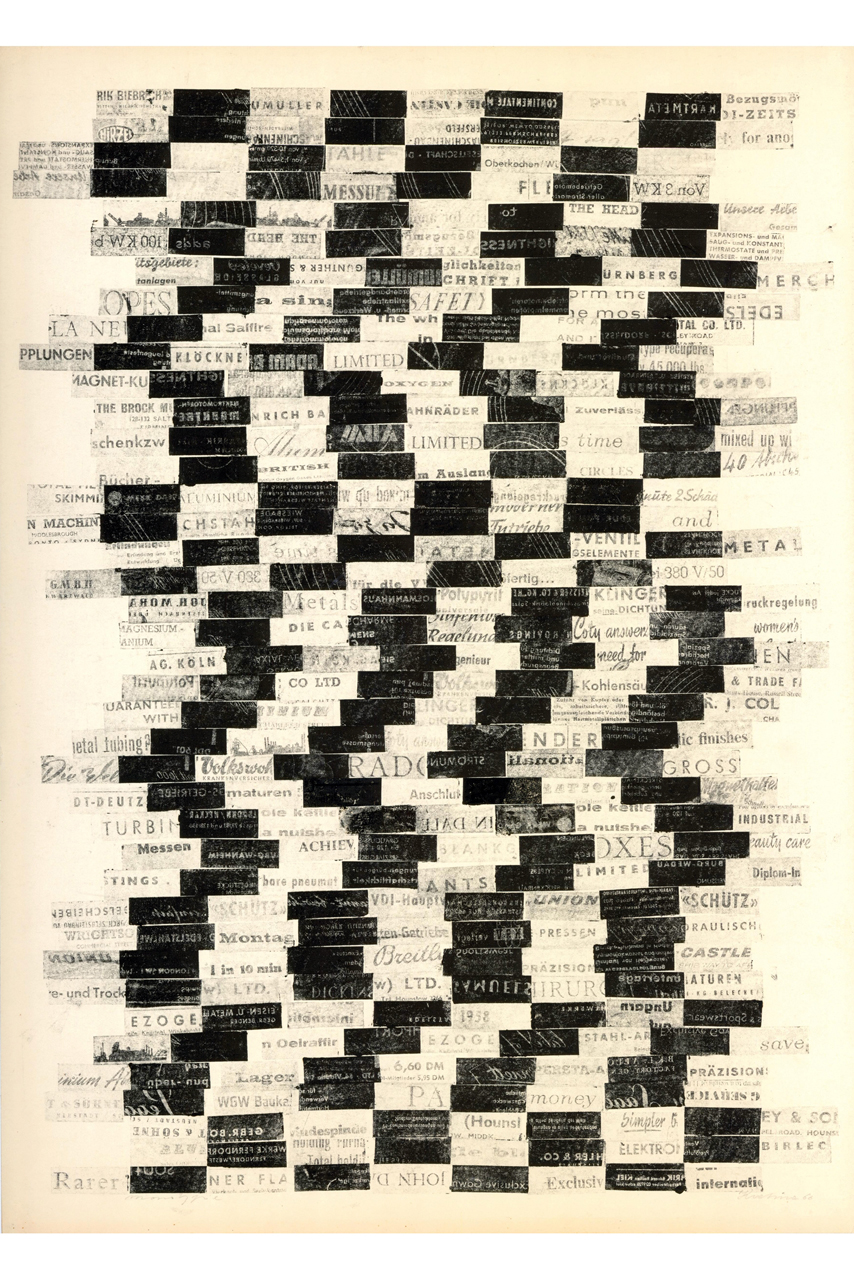
Radoslav Kratina, Font overprint IV, monotype (1965)

In the mid-1960s he assembled structural reliefs, which he initially used as matrices for printing monotypes and later fixed as independent works. He used repetition of simple elements such as strings, pasta letters, strips of paper, razor blades, fragments of gramophone records or matches. In his structural reliefs he followed only the compositional order without any content aspects. He participated in visual poetry exhibitions with letter reliefs. He was attracted by the rhythmic mobility of the structure and the orthogonal order, which replaced the previous "baroque" anarchy of informel. The transition from informal texture to an ordered serial structure represents a fundamental developmental feature of Kratina's graphic work. After 1964, he was already assembling relief pictures that moved away from the Czech existential conception of structure and prepared the ground for the future grasp of geometry.

In 1964, he created his "Zero Variabile" from matches stacked inside a wooden frame of equal depth, where it was possible to change the layout of the resulting relief by finger pressure. He thus discovered the unwittingly transformable structure and variability of the work as a new quality he had not originally aimed for. This discovery of the unconfined and transformable nature of the work became Kratina's life programme, which he developed over the next 30 years. In the same year he made a relief from cork plugs based on the same principle. Kratina's notion of geometric abstraction is rooted in his previous structural work and contains a wealth of detail that places him at the counterpoint of the constructivist minimization of means of expression. Ever since his graphic experiments, he has pursued an aesthetic order that has led him steadily to geometric abstraction. The theme of his work is structural, based on a multitude of elements that can be rearranged, folded and moved in various ways, creating relationships of dissimilar clusters from accumulated details.

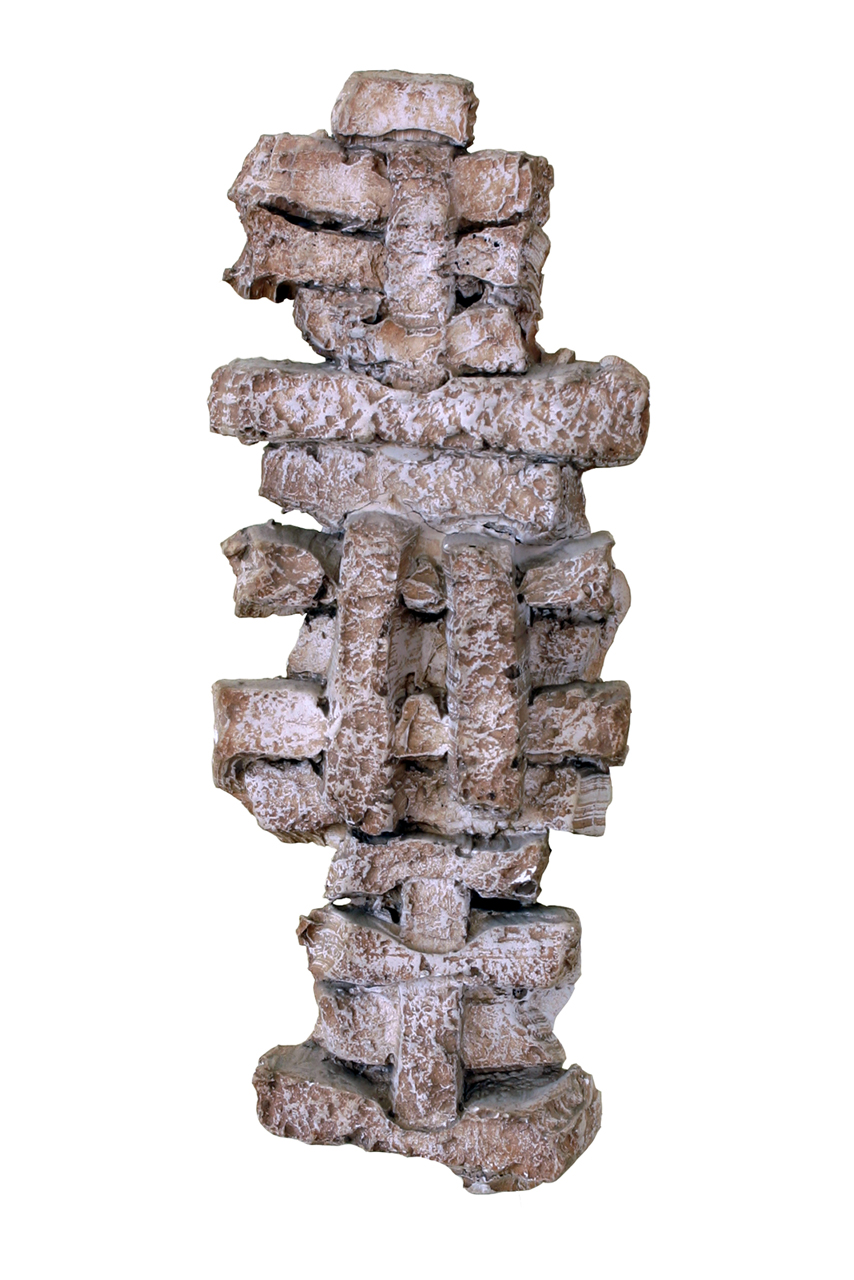
Radoslav Kratina, Relief, plaster (1963)

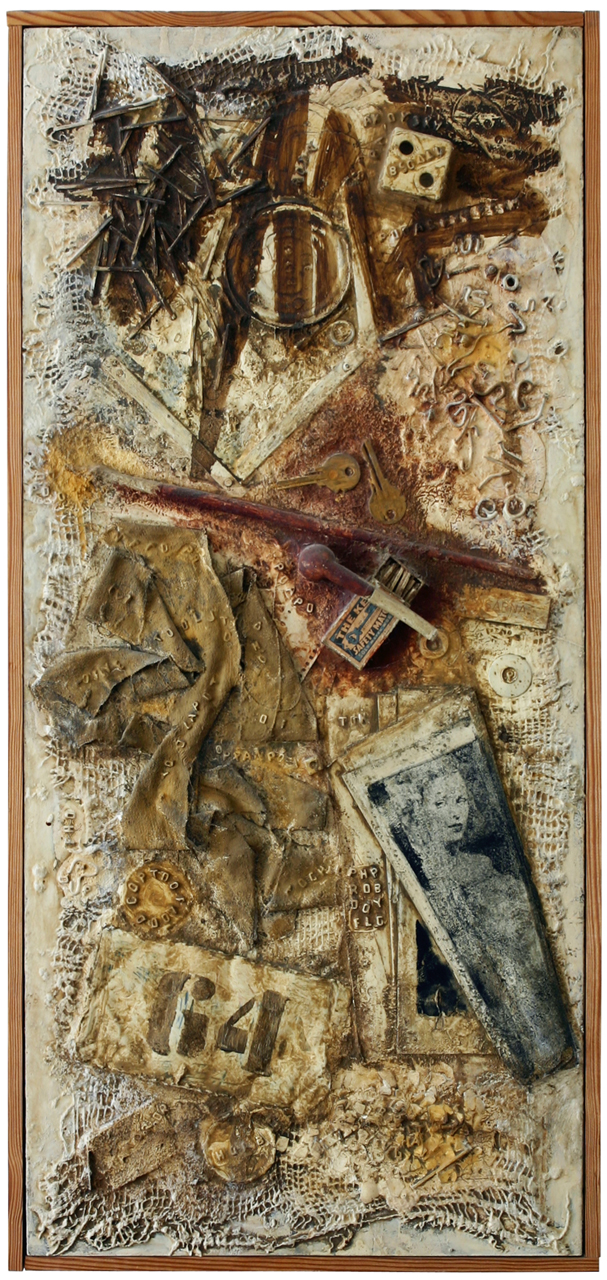
Radoslav Kratina, Relief assemblage (1964)

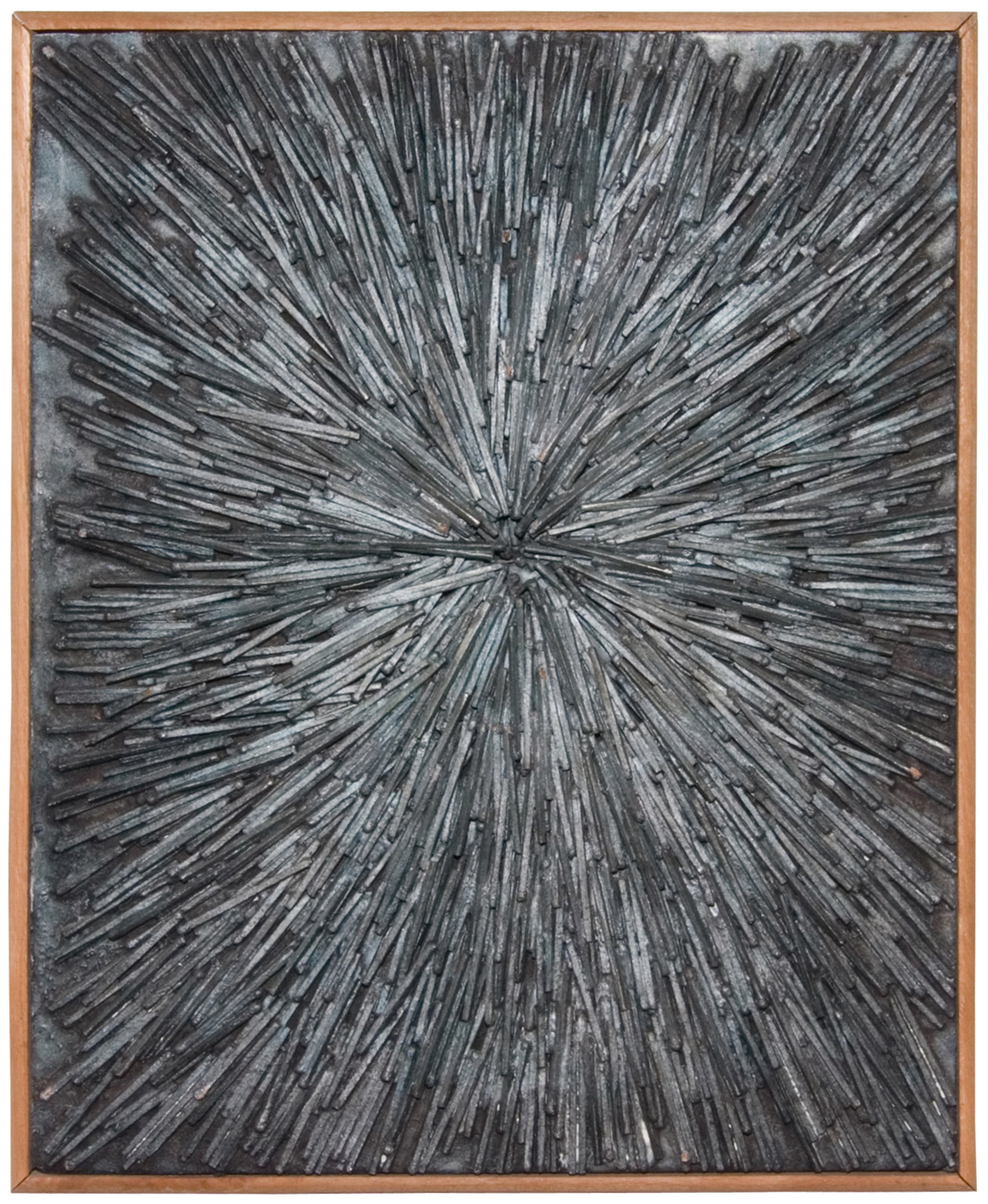
Radoslav Kratina, Sun (1965)

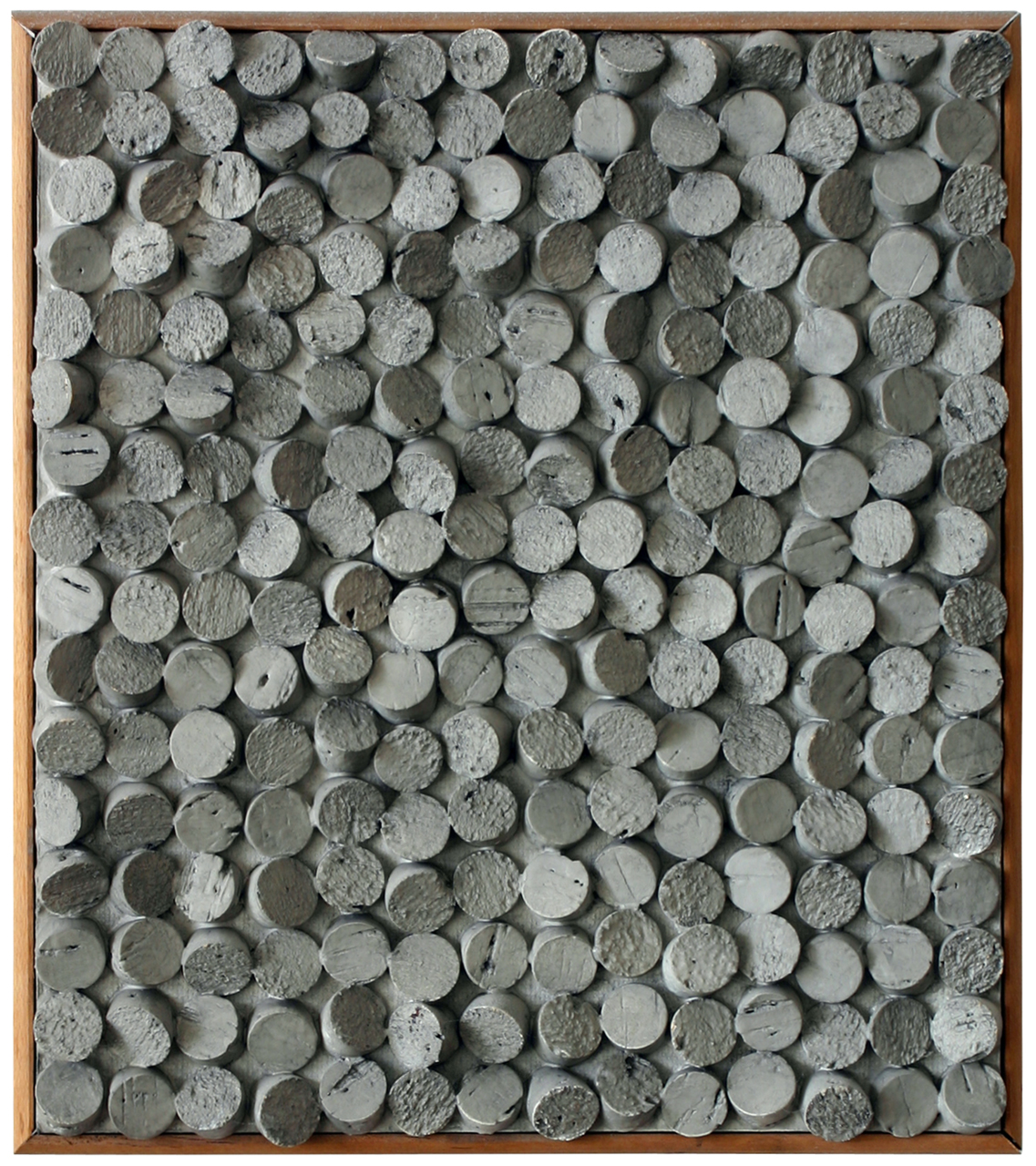
Radoslav Kratina, Corks (1964)

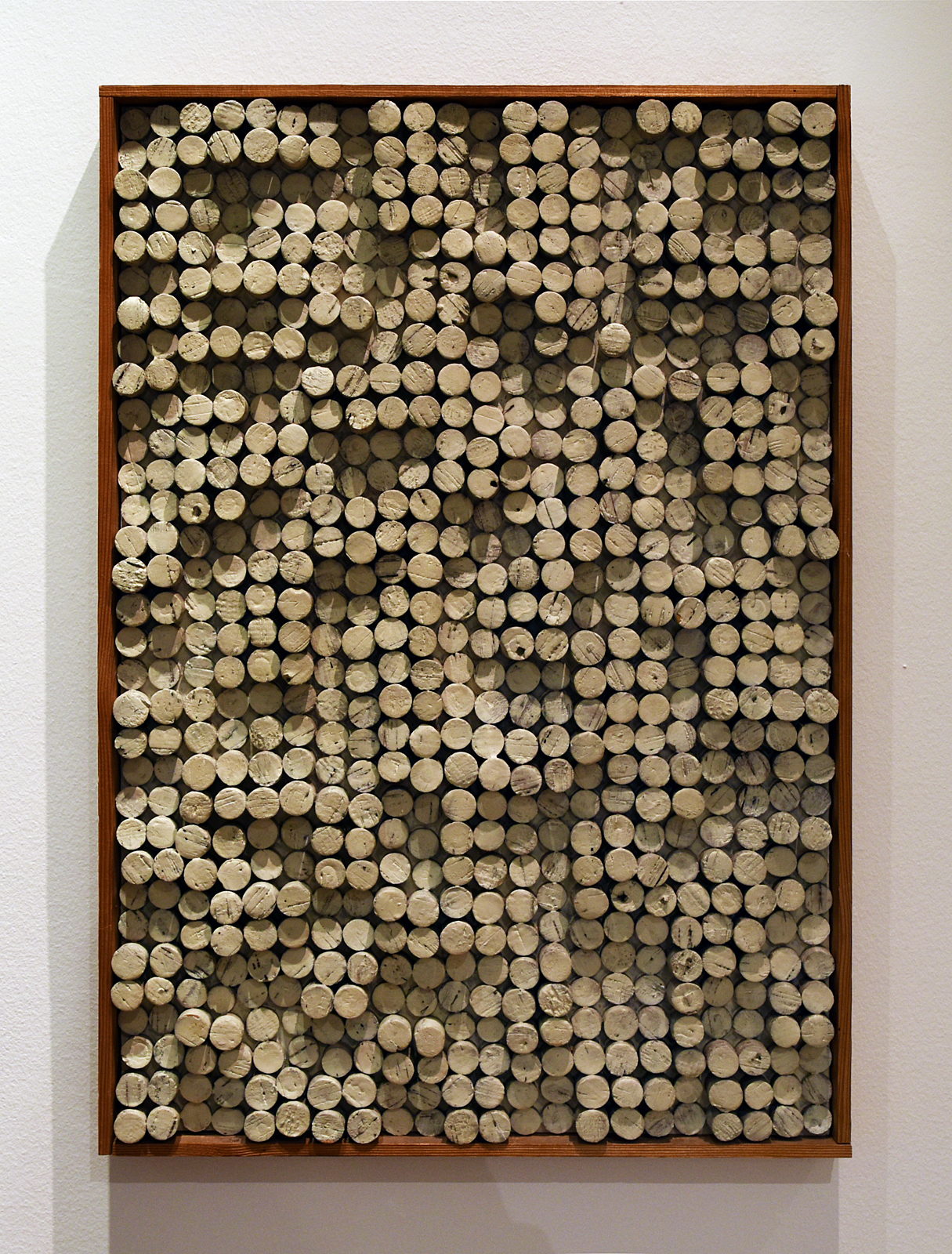
Radoslav Kratina, Corks (1964)

The inspiration for his next pieces came from a modern necklace made up of several hinges with white and black beads, which he discovered in a foreign magazine. The objects Kratina created from 1965 onwards, which he called "variabils", were already constructed in such a way as to allow for changing the composition of the individual elements by shifting or rotating them around the axis. This possibility was also offered to the visitors of the exhibition. The first were the Horizontal Sticks (1965) - a vertical assembly of red and white flag sticks that allowed for horizontal displacement. Initially, his material was a variety of wooden elements whose surfaces were differentiated by white, red and blue (Rollers on the Axis, 1967, Homage to Stazewsky, 1967), sometimes supplemented by other colours (20 x 6 Cubes, 1967). These objects were usually visually linked to the wall and showed a significant variation in their frontal colour structure.

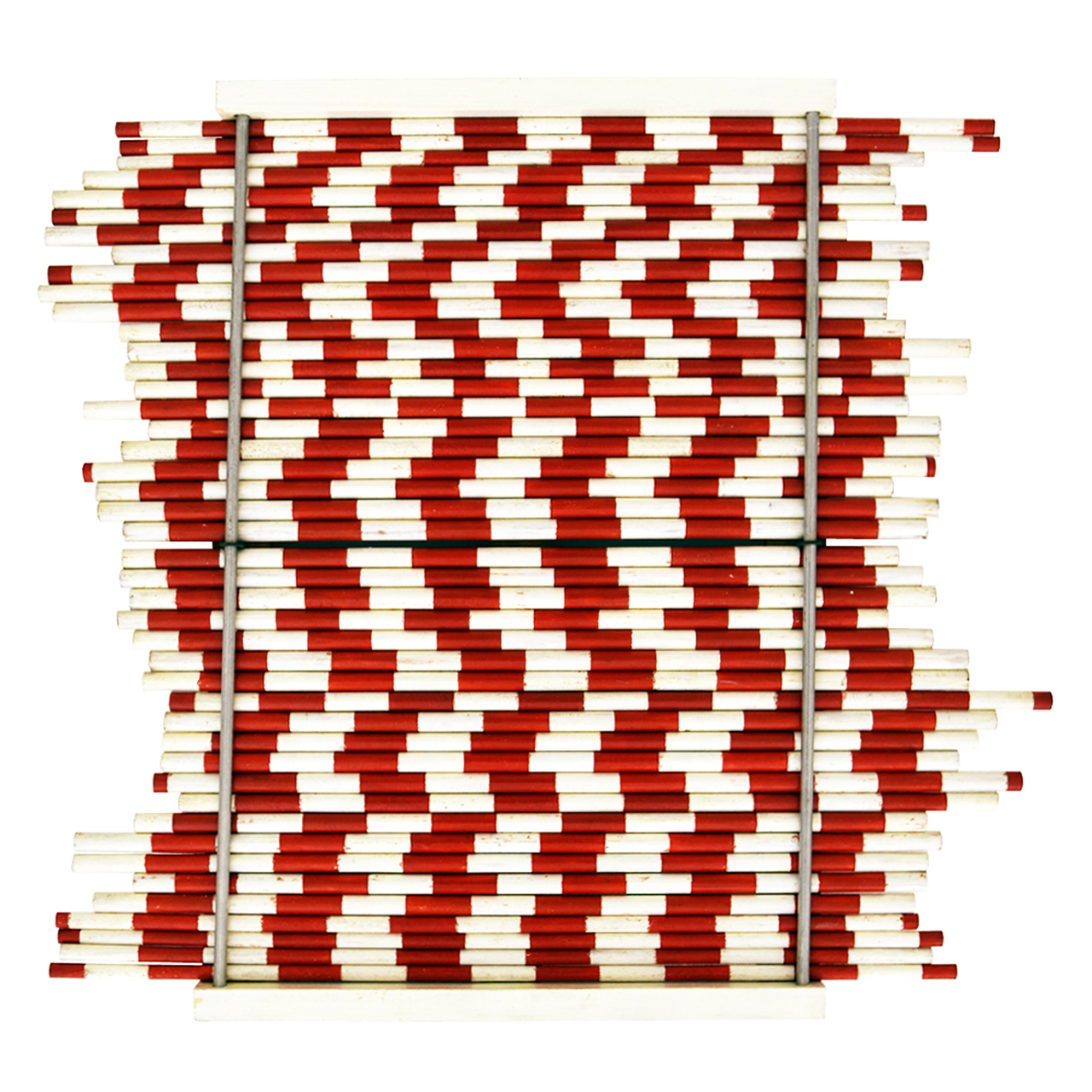
Radoslav Kratina, Horizontal stics (1965)

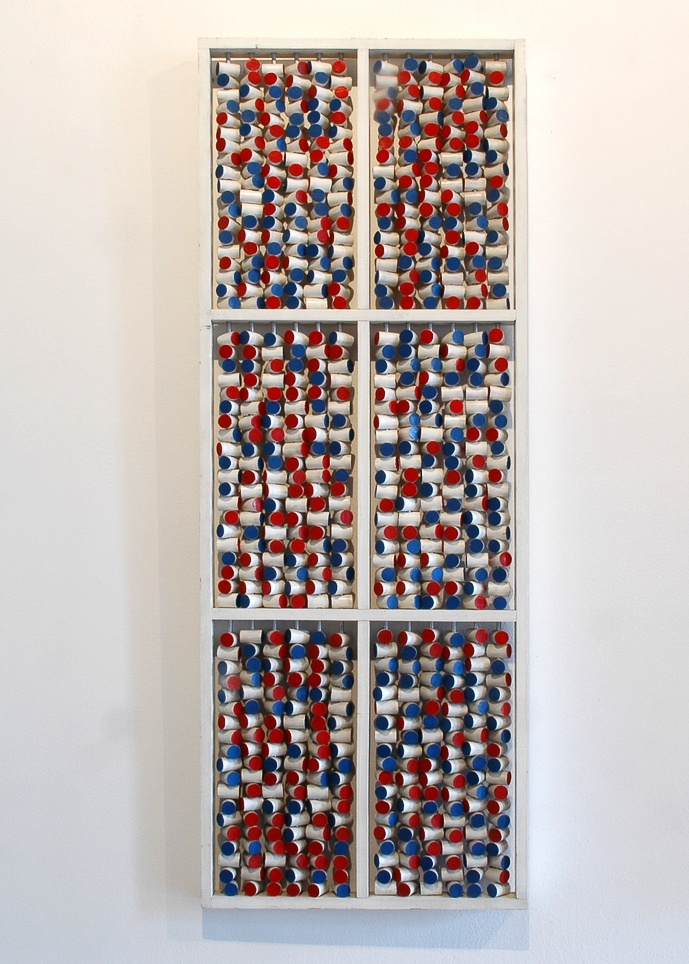
Radoslav Kratina, Cylinders on the axis (1967), National Gallery Prague

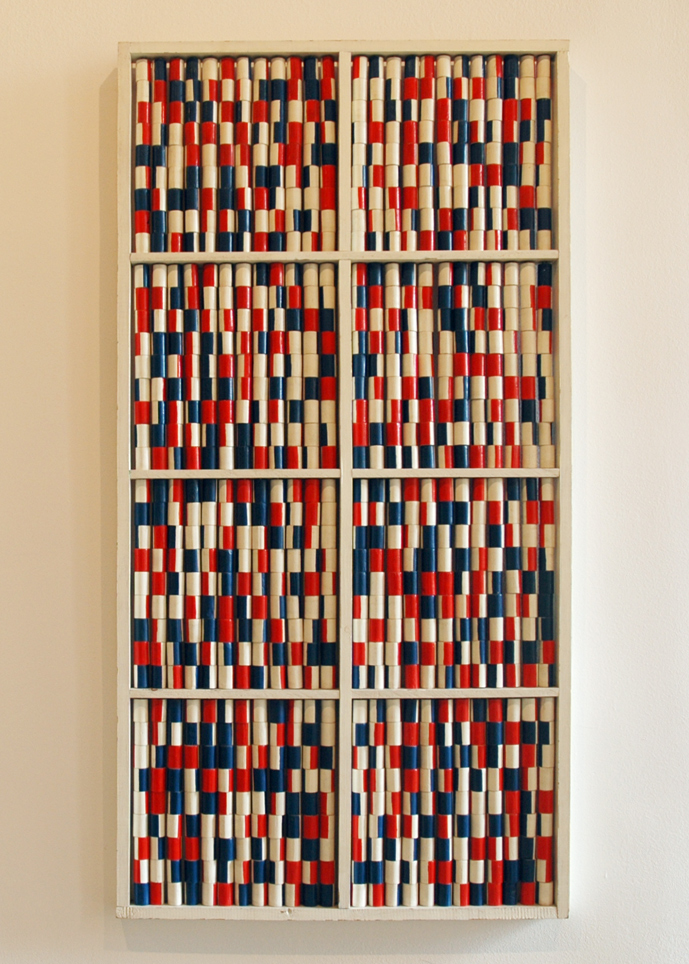
Radoslav Kratina, Colour relief (1967), National Gallery Prague

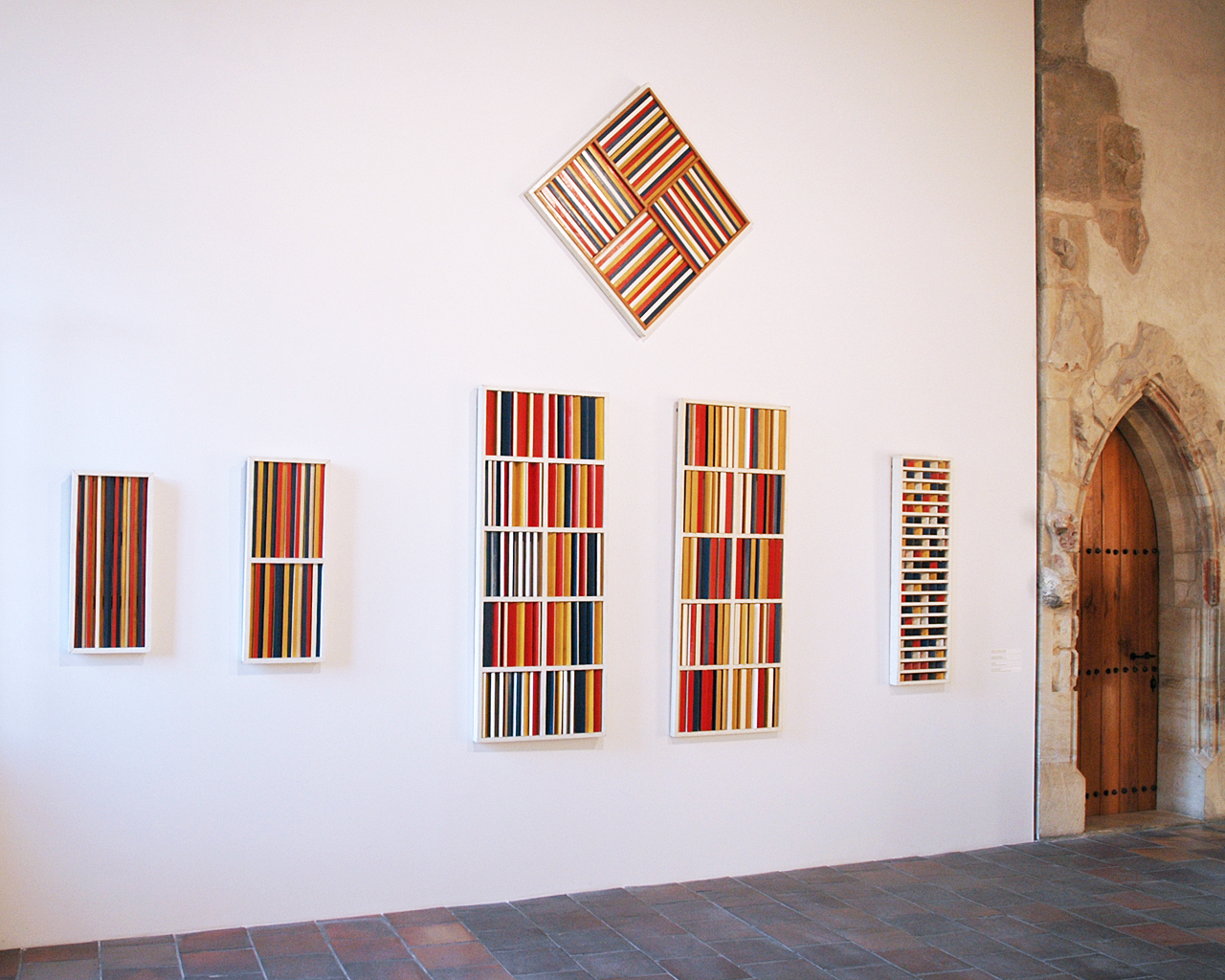
Radoslav Kratina, Variable objects (1966–1967)

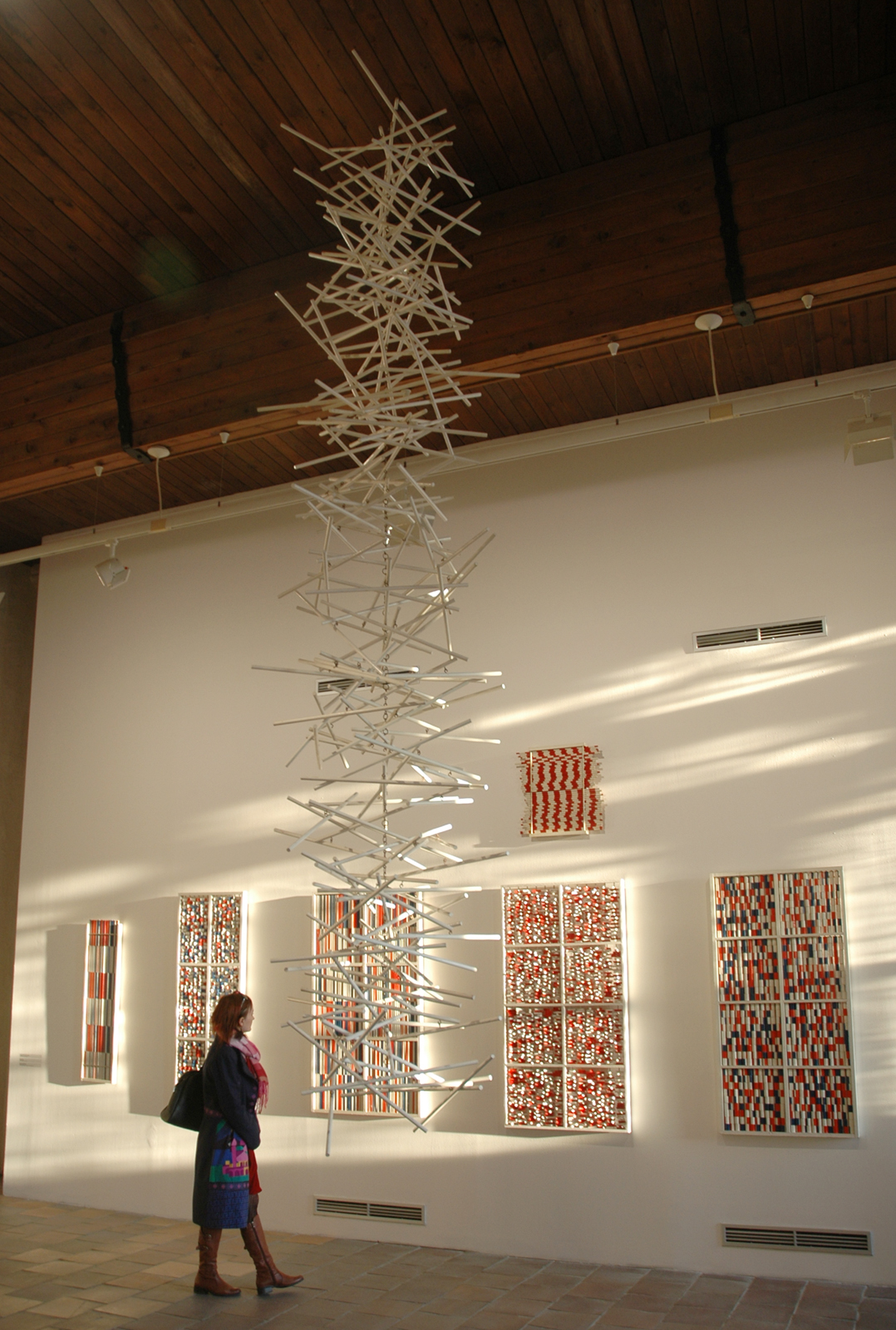
Radoslav Kratina, White stics (late 1960s)

Later variabils are usually monochromatic, stained or left in the original colour of the wood (Mosaic, 1969). In addition to movement around the axis and reciprocal sliding, the principle of tilting in relation to the base is applied in some of them (Wooden Mane, 1967). The colour variabils are followed by white ones, where light and shadow replace colour contrast (White Prisms in a Frame, 1968, Large White Structure, 1969, White Relief, 1969–1970).

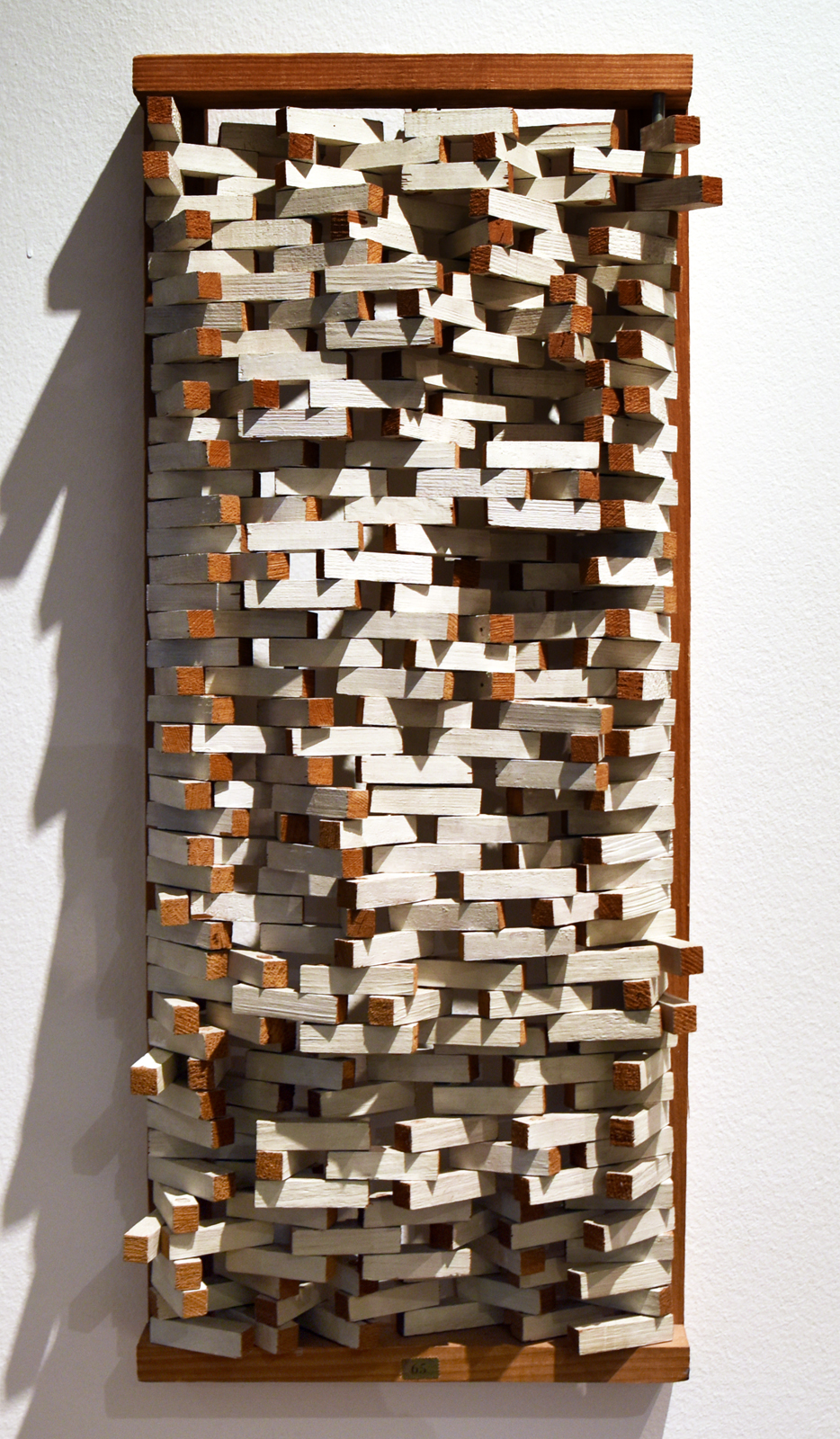
Radoslav Kratina, Chain relief (1966)

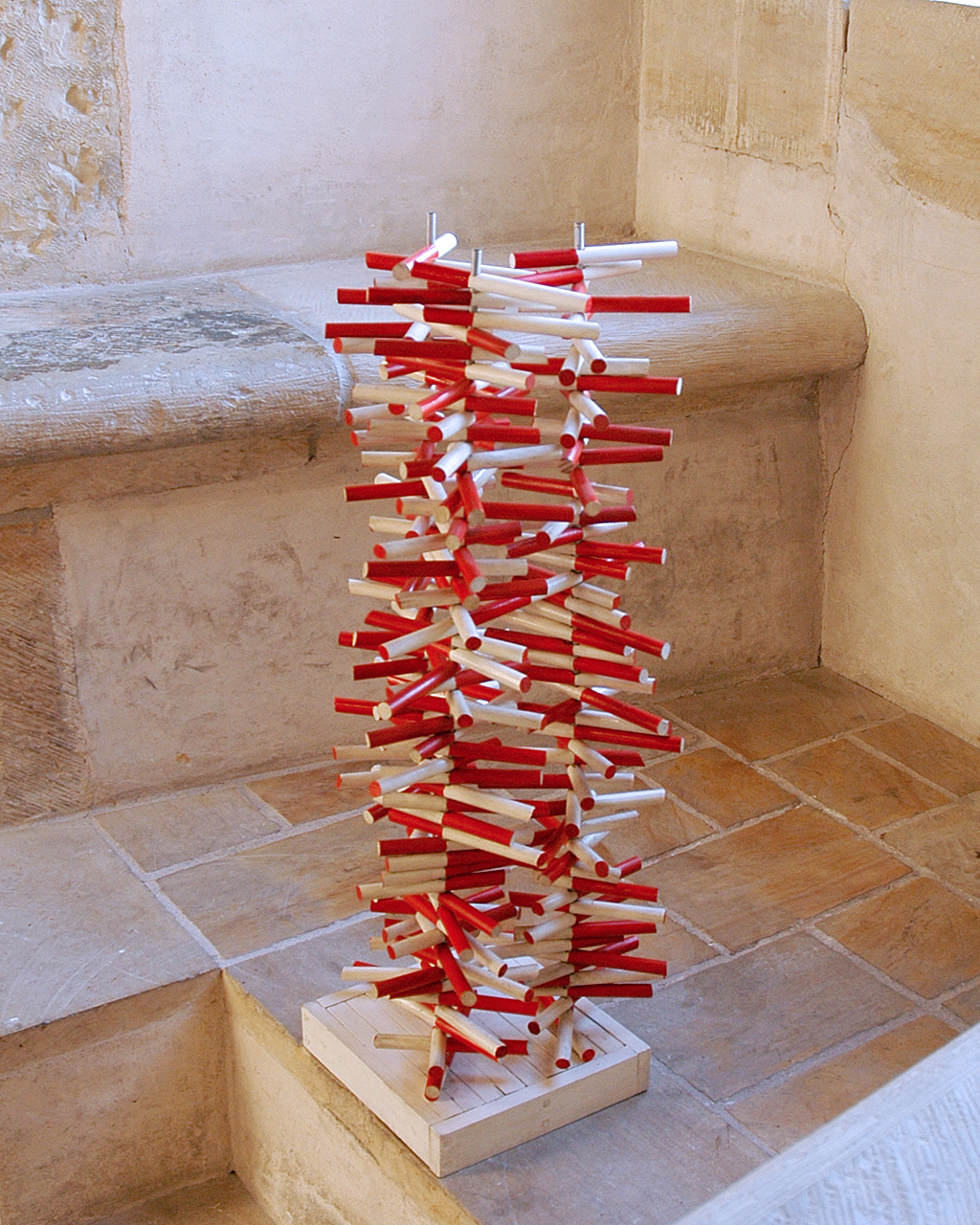
Radoslav Kratina, Three axes (1966)

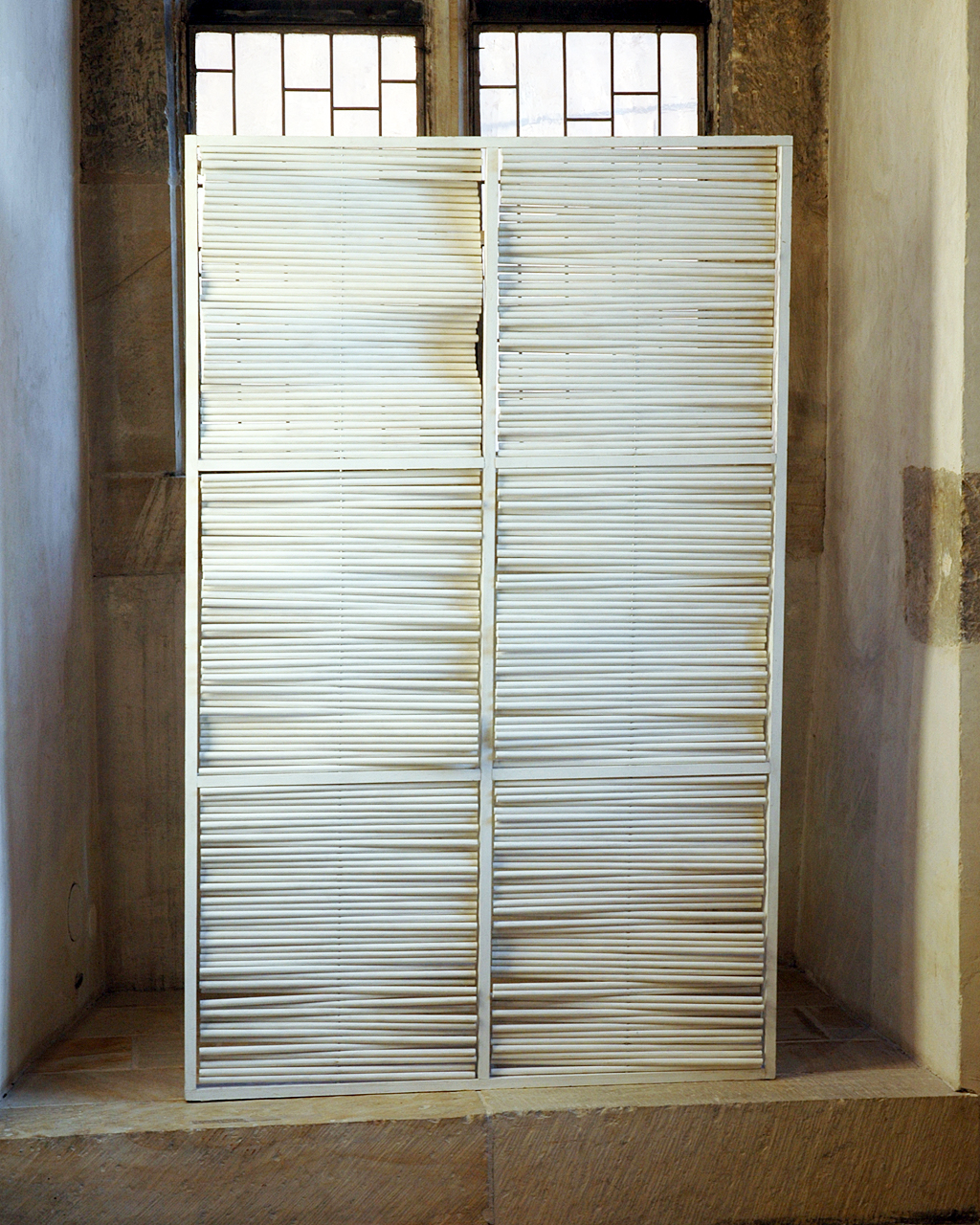
Radoslav Kratina, Horizontal stics (1967–1968), National Gallery Prague

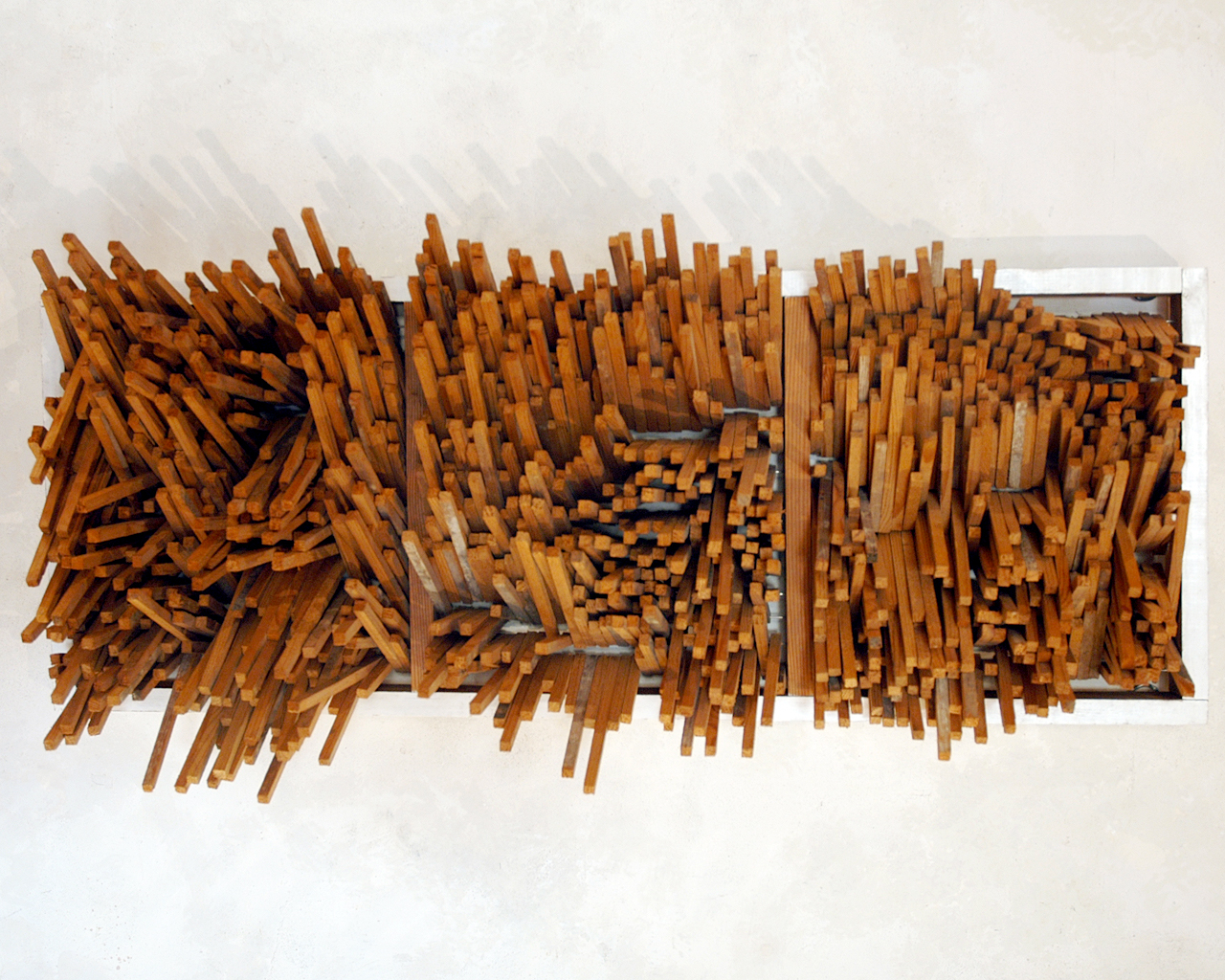
Radoslav Kratina, Wooden mane (1967)

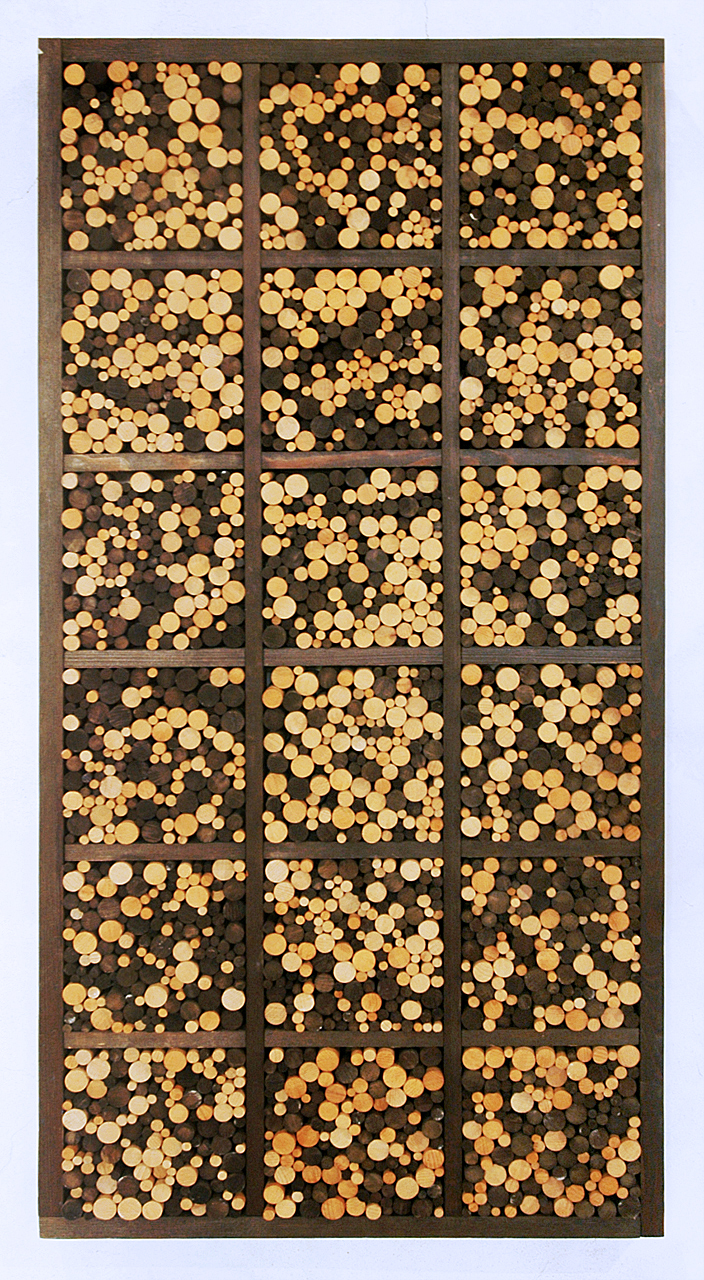
Radoslav Kratina, Mosaic (1969), Prague City Gallery

Kratina's wooden objects, although based on geometric principles, bore traces of the author's handwriting and thus stood out somewhat from the strictly rational work of other constructivists who emphasized perfect material processing. Kratina used them to introduce a principle of play that was unusual and contradicted the geometric form of the works. However, the woodworking was not precise enough for his purposes, and besides, wood was subject to climatic influences and drying, making it difficult to position objects. In 1975–1976, he used Plexiglas for several variations due to its transparency, but problems with finishing soon discouraged him. In the late 1960s and early 1970s, Kratina returned to printmaking and created a series of colour serigraphs.

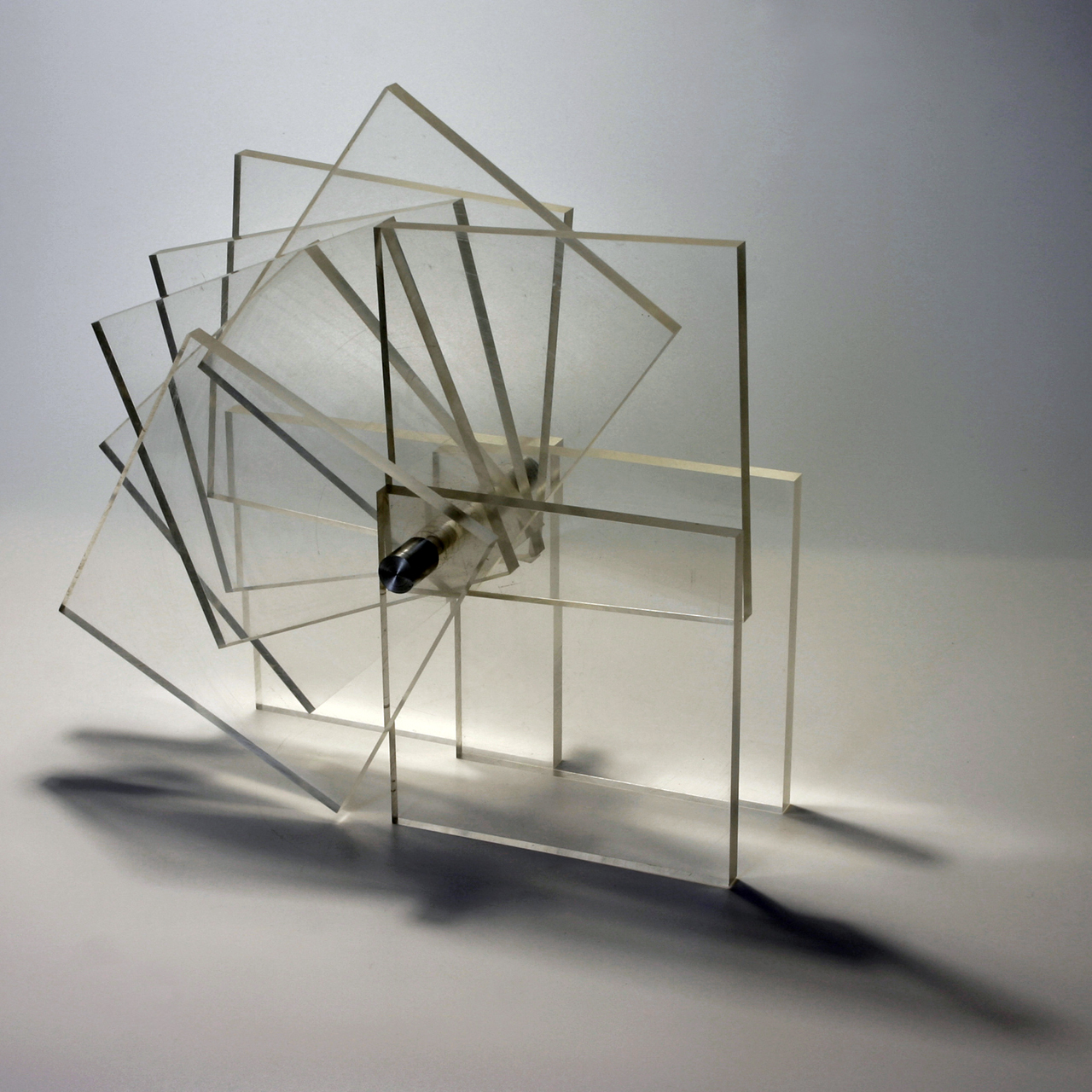
Radoslav Kratina, Variable plexiglas object (1971)

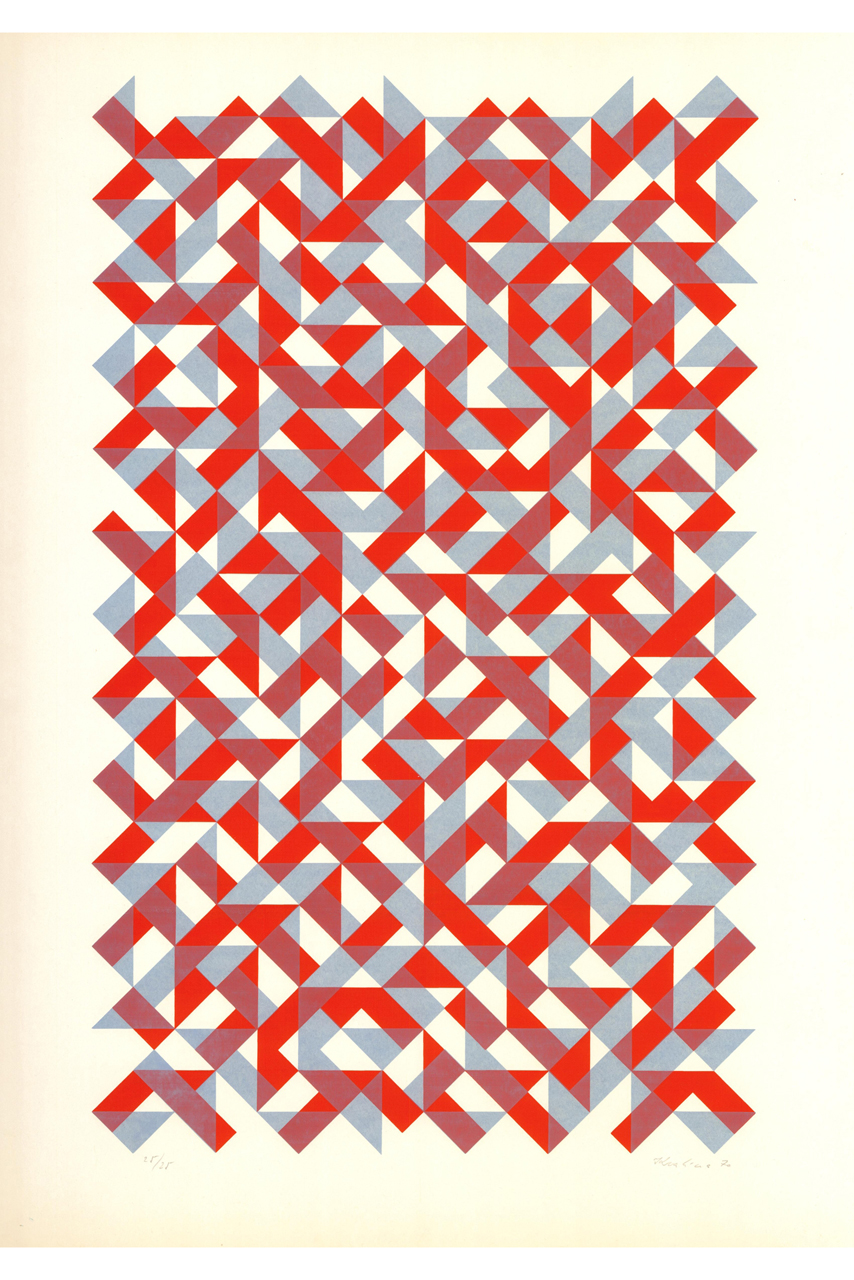
Radoslav Kratina, Composition I, serigraphy (1970)

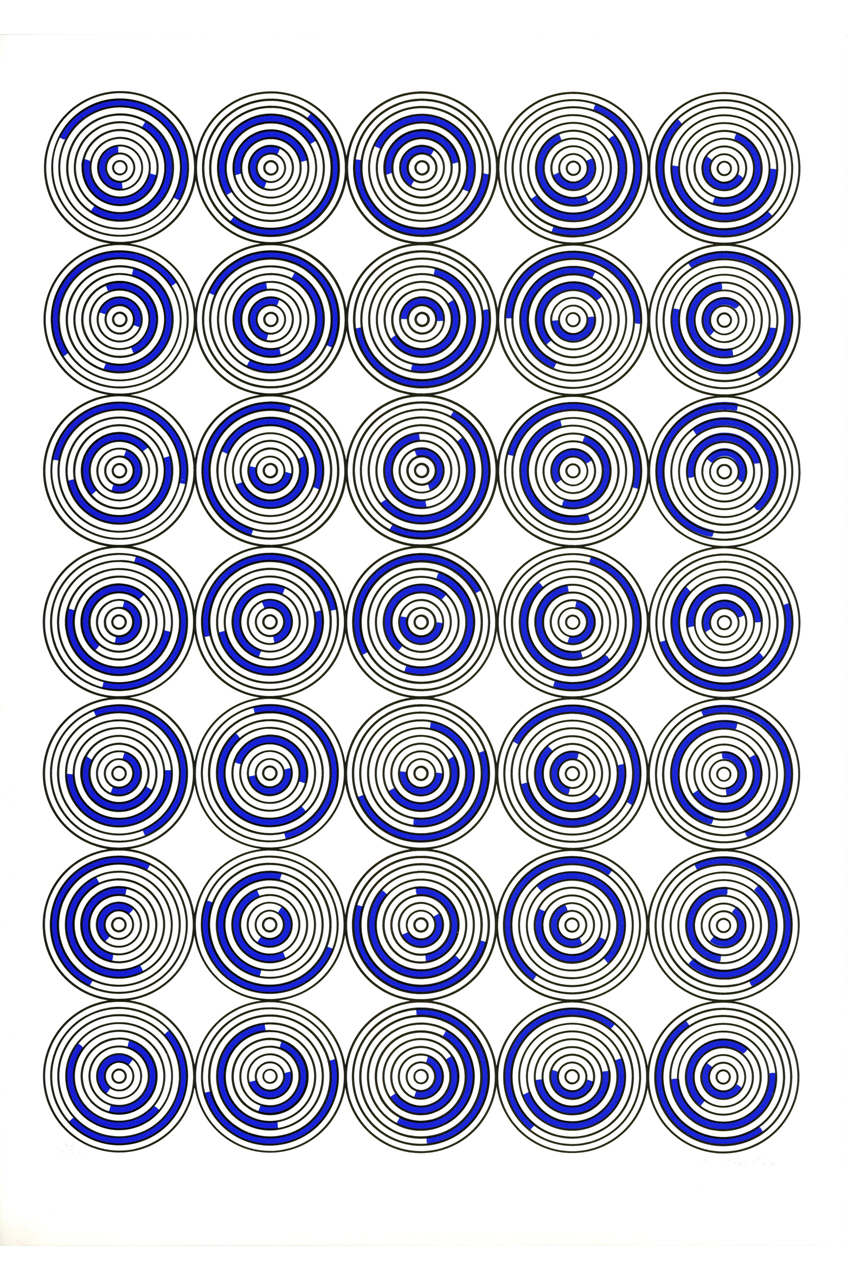
Radoslav Kratina, Composition II, variant, serigraphy (1970)

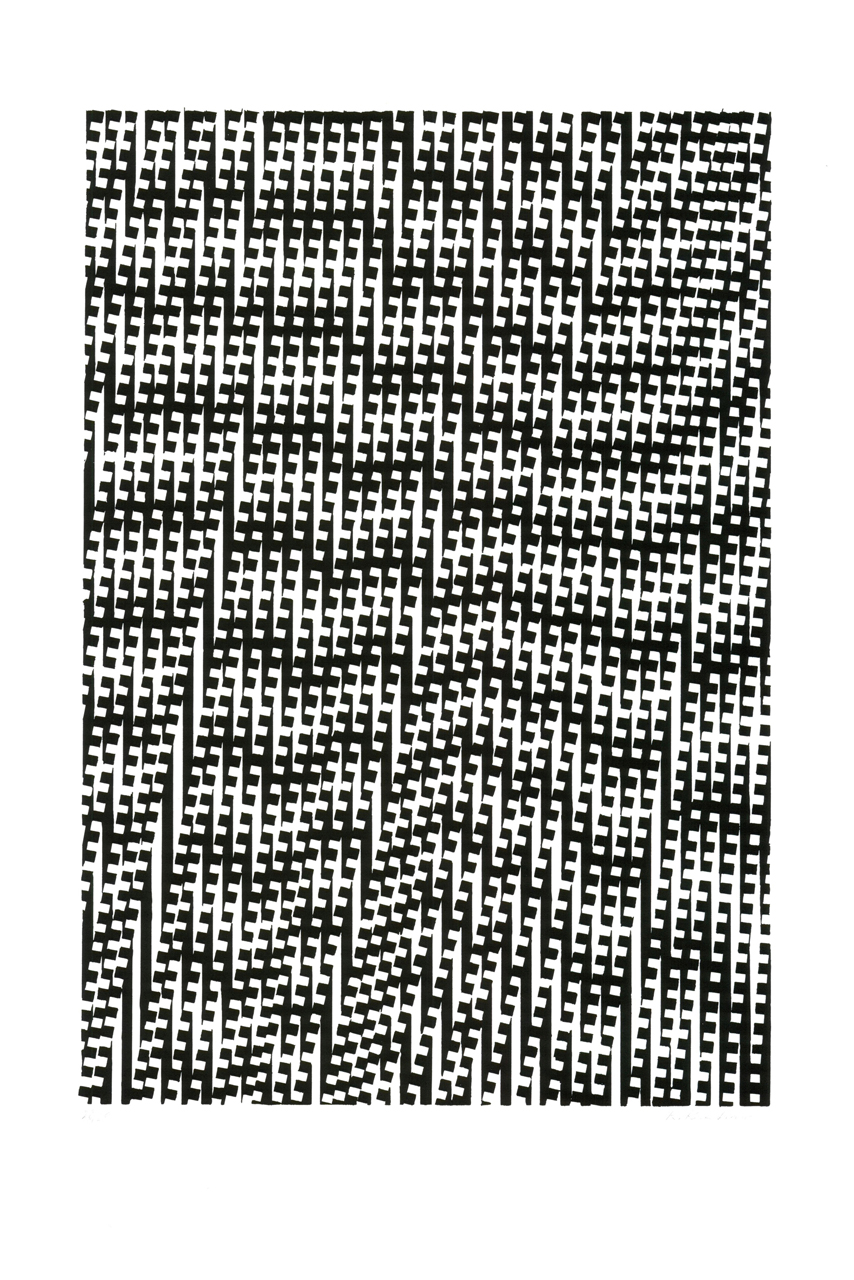
Radoslav Kratina, Composition (black and white), serigraphy (1972)

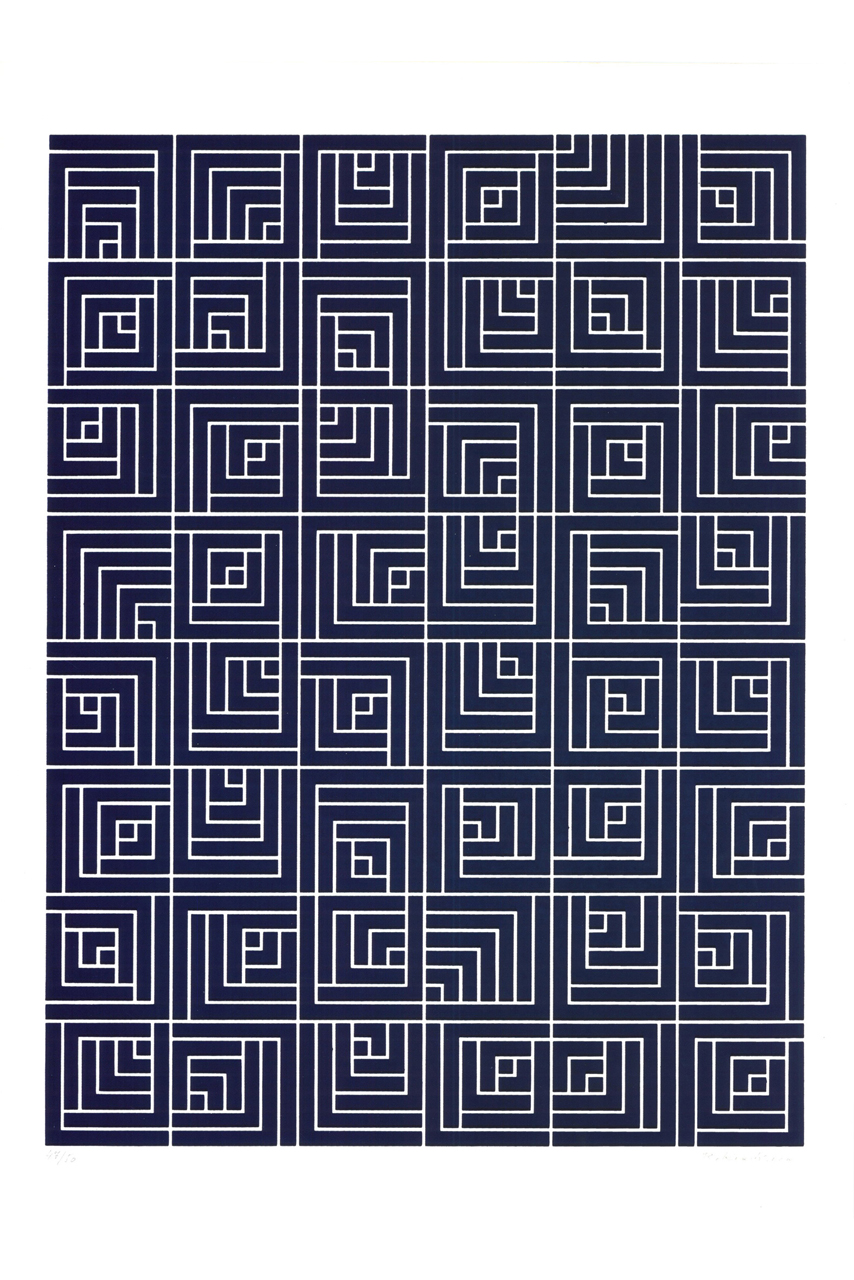
Radoslav Kratina, Black and white serigraphy (1972)

=== Highlights ===
The precise shape of the machined metal parts allowed for more complex spatial and shape solutions. Initially, he bought prefabricated profiles from a metallurgical material shop, but over time he found craftsmen who were able to produce and assemble the sculptures according to his drawings. Kratina suppressed the subjectivity of his distinctive style and arrived at a rational artistic expression that conformed to the detached universal forms of geometry. For his first metal variabils he used hollow aluminium cylinders (Metal Object I, 1970), but was dissatisfied with the optical qualities of the material and opted for chrome or nickel-plated iron and brass or aluminium and lightweight dural for his subsequent works. At first, the basis of the variations consisted of simple geometric elements, such as parts of spheres, cylinders and cubes, with surfaces treated by polishing, matting or blackening. He assembled them in a way that allowed independent movement of each element or of the whole axes on which they were fixed. He did not design the objects as mathematical-geometric problems, but was inspired by real objects, such as a wooden folding ruler, a tank train, an archery target, the grid of a metal mat, etc.

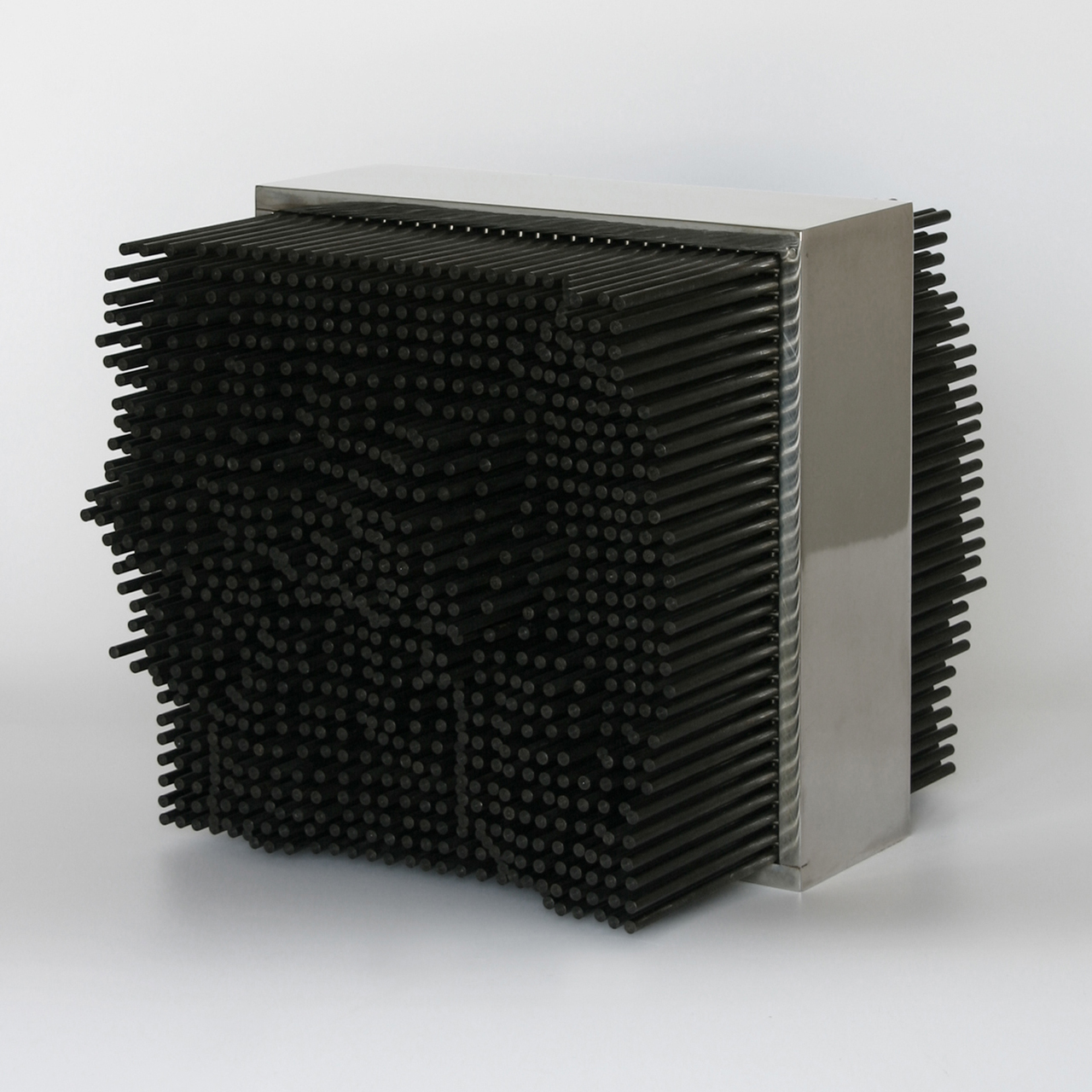
Radoslav Kratina, Metal rods in a frame (1970s)

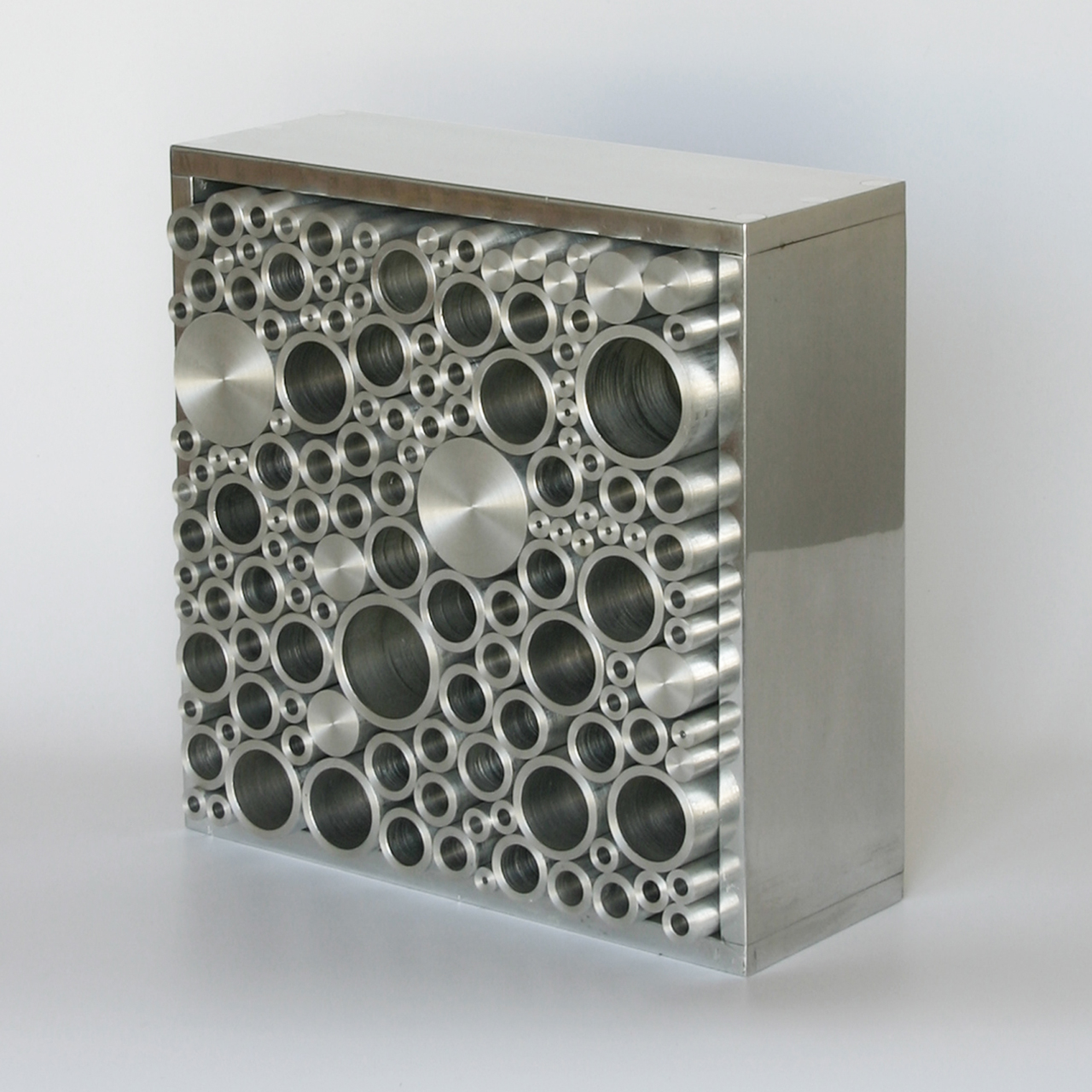
Radoslav Kratina, Short cylinders in a frame (1978–1979)

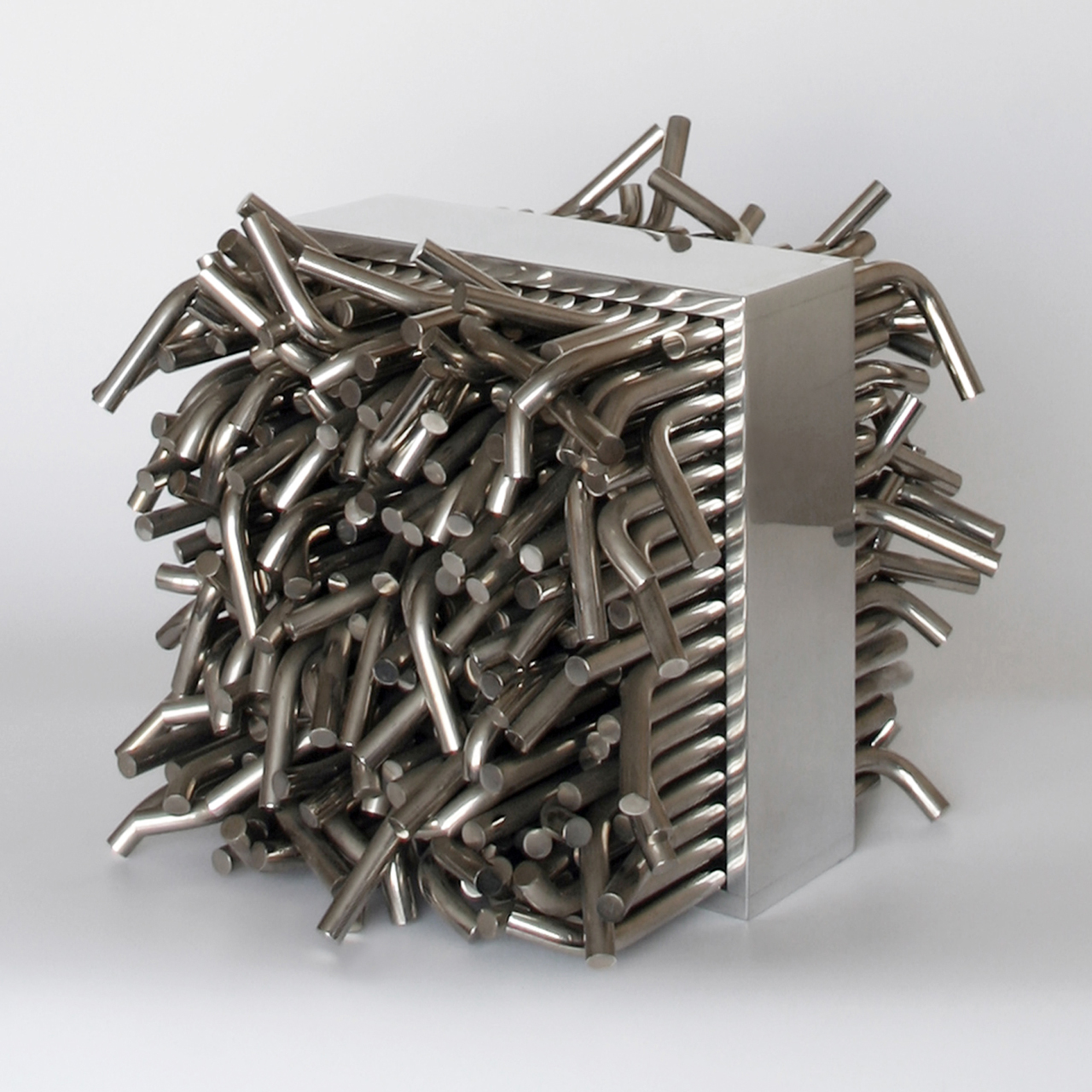
Radoslav Kratina, Bent metal rods in a frame (1970s)

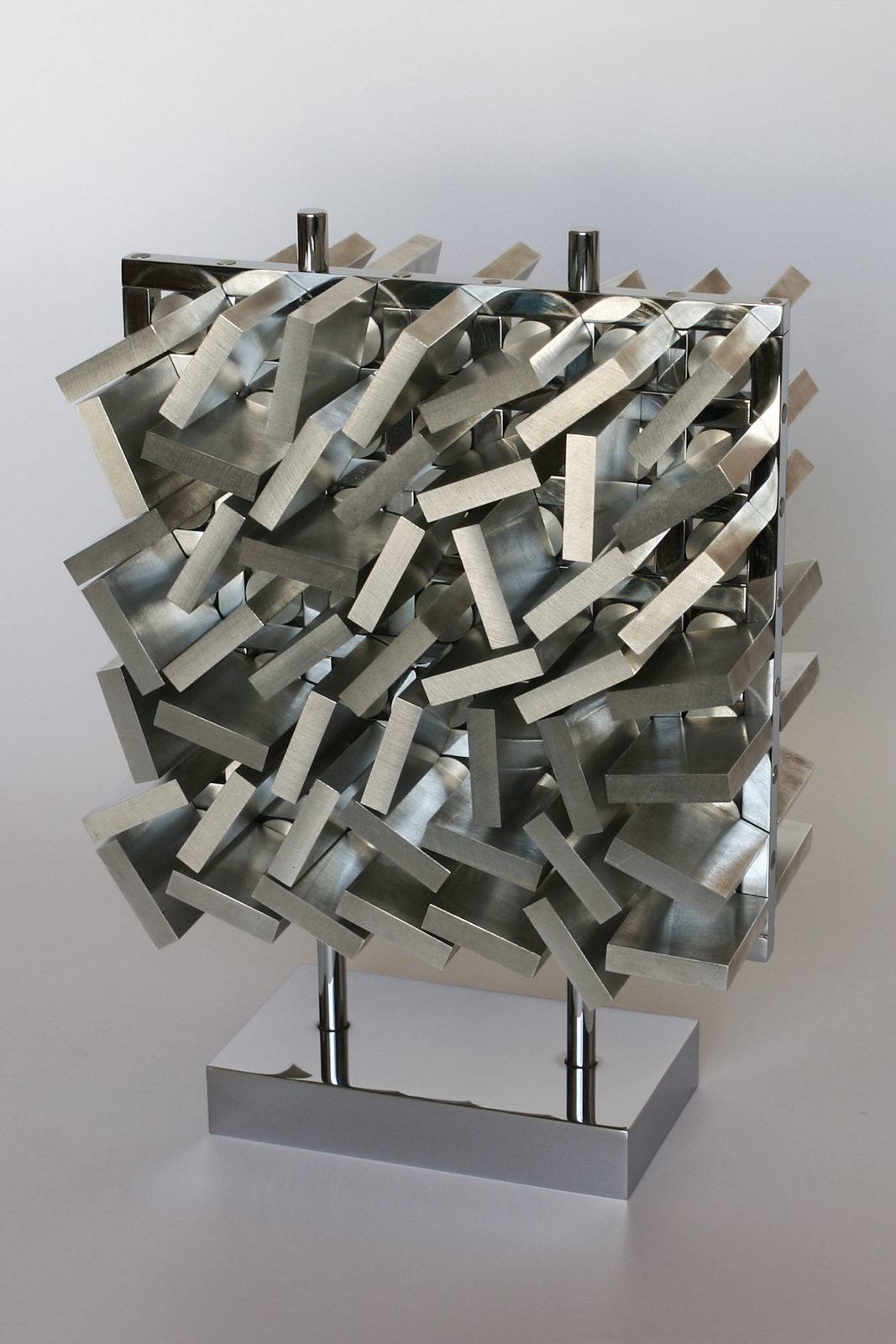
Radoslav Kratina, Rotating cubes (1st half of 1980s)

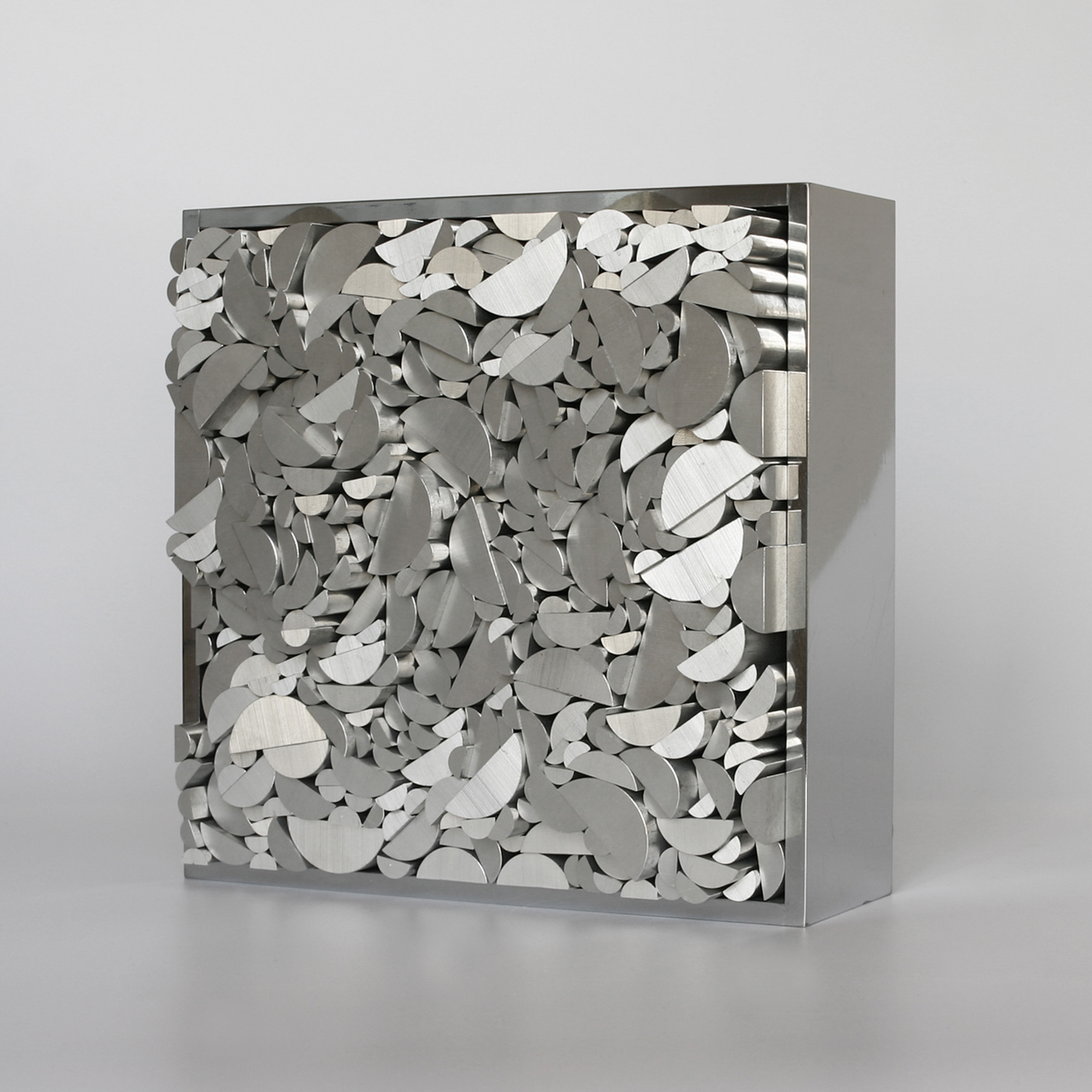
Radoslav Kratina, Sections of cylinders in the frame (1980s)

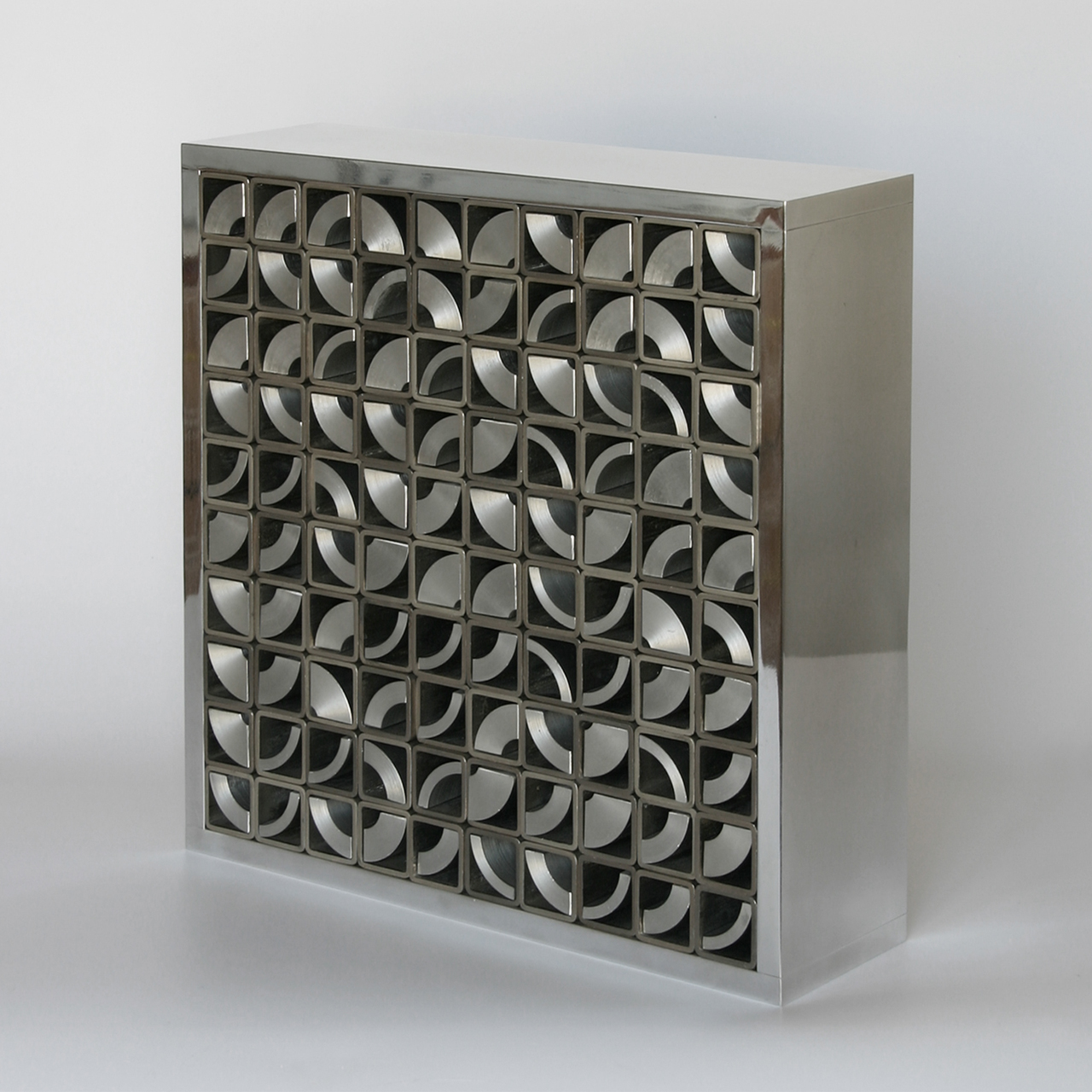
Radoslav Kratina, Quarter-circles in a grid (1980s)

Kratina's works were mostly small in size, and the artist resisted converting them to larger dimensions because their original intent would be lost. In the 1980s, he made one exception when he and other artists were offered by the architects Ladislav Lábus and Alena Šrámková to participate in the artistic design of the new Lužiny shopping centre. In 1983, he designed a Transformable Object made of coloured metal cylinders measuring 3 x 6 m for the entrance to the haberdashery shop. The work was installed in 1991 and deinstalled after a few years. It was bought from the scrap heap by the director Ivo Janoušek for the National Technical Museum. Transformable Object was damaged in the warehouse during the floods and was finally rescued and restored for Radoslav Kratina's exhibition at the Prague City Gallery in 2013.

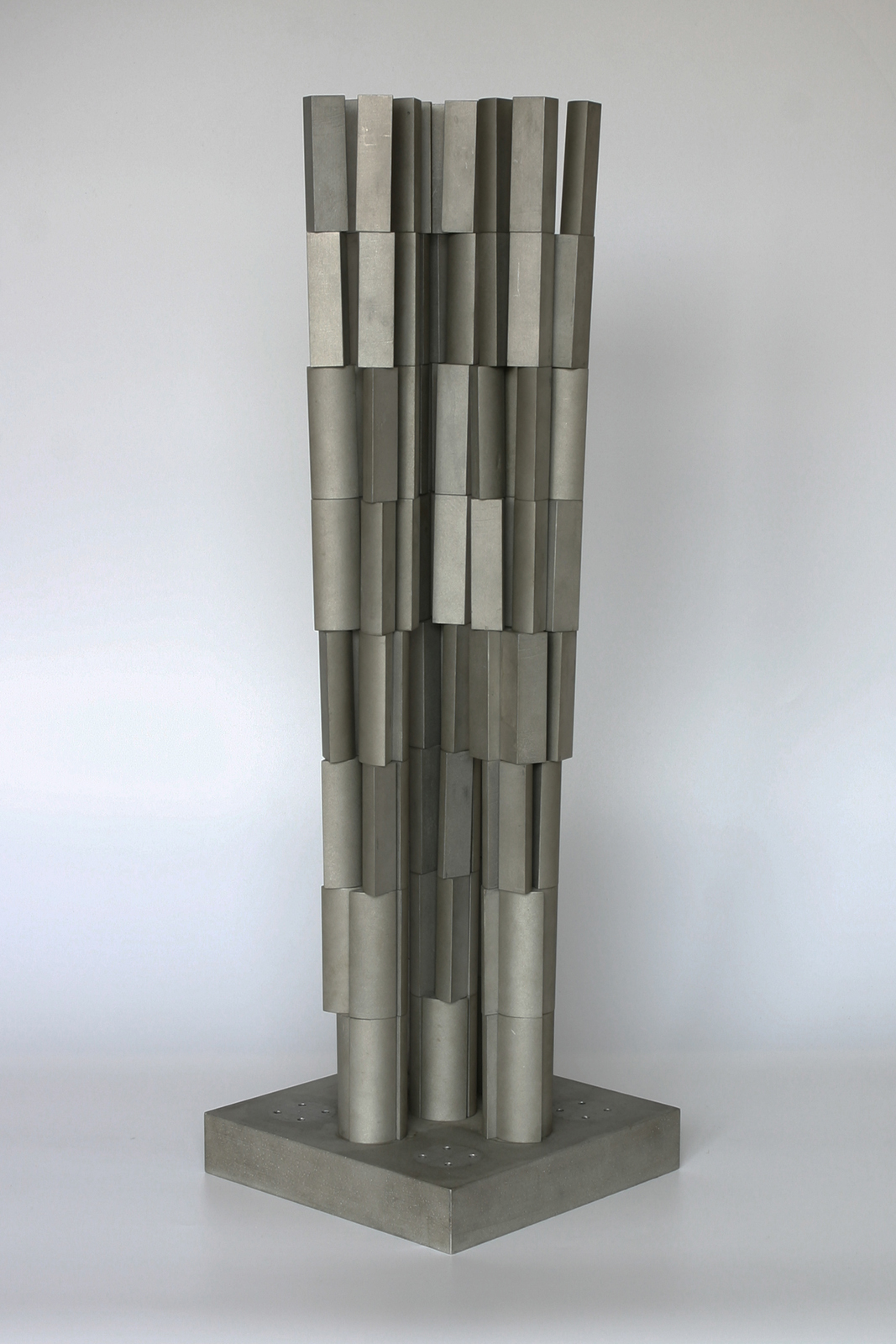
Radoslav Kratina, Metal variabil - cubes and cylinders (1970s)

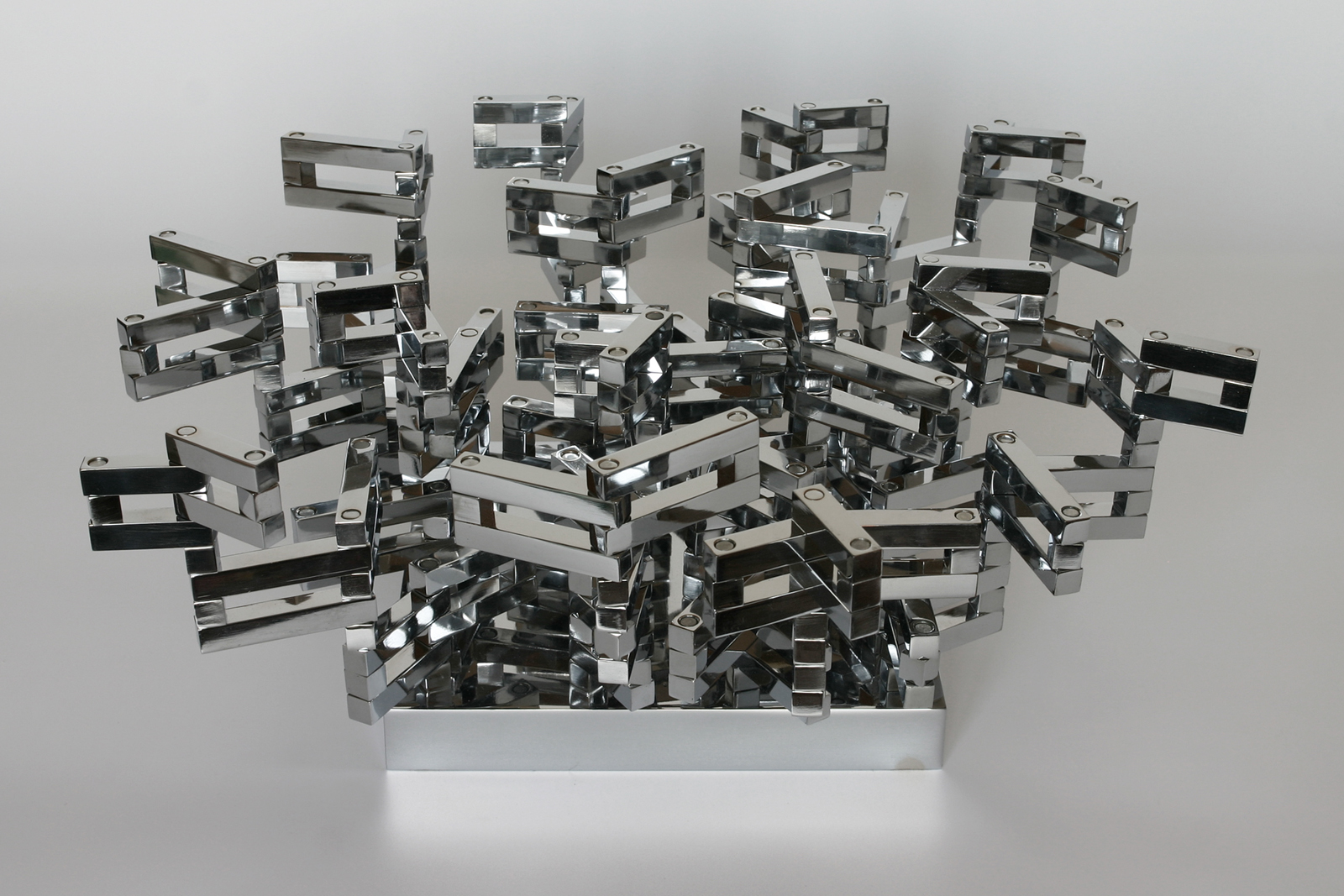
Radoslav Kratina, Metal variabil with frames (1982)

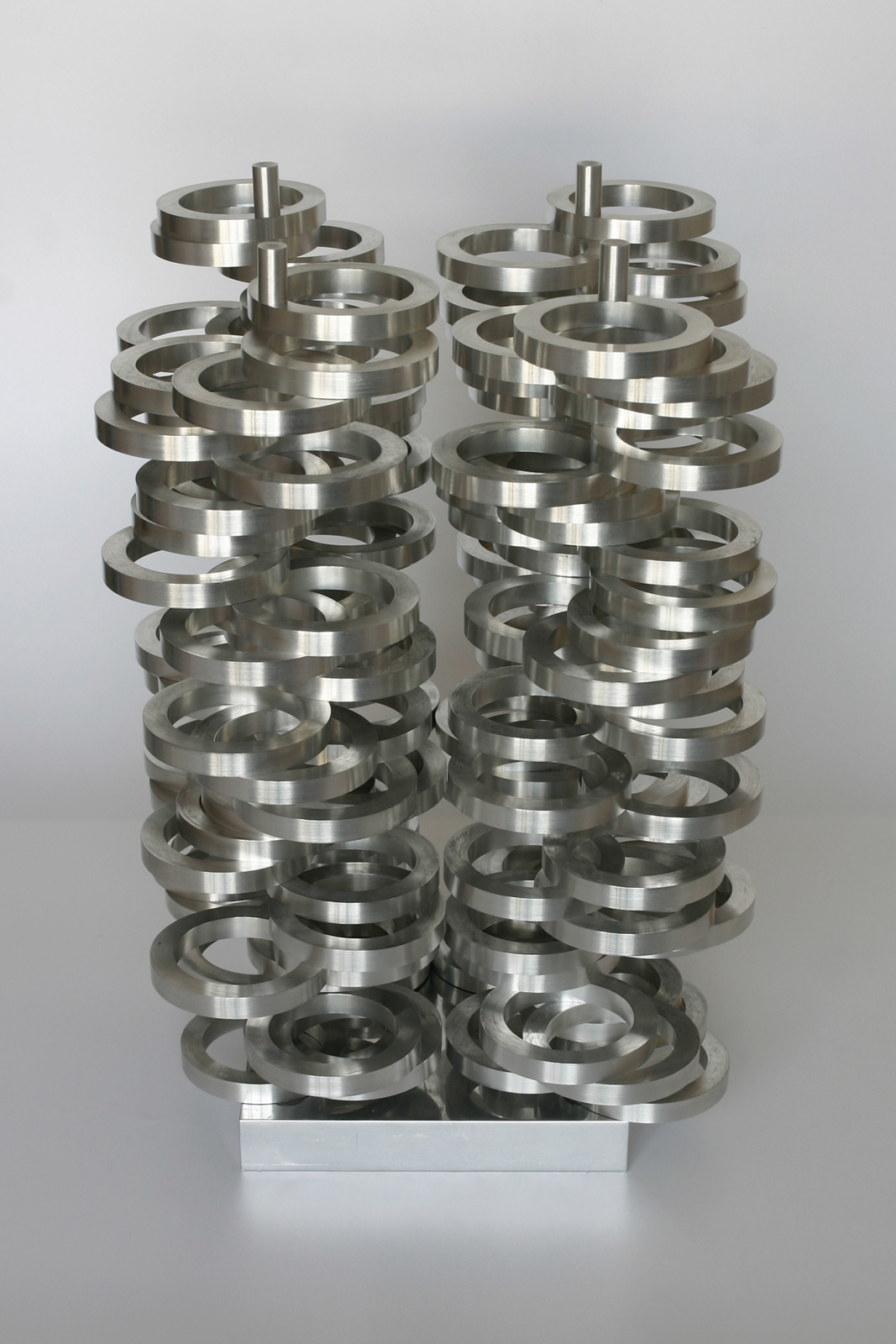
Radoslav Kratina, Horizontal rings on four axes (1980s)

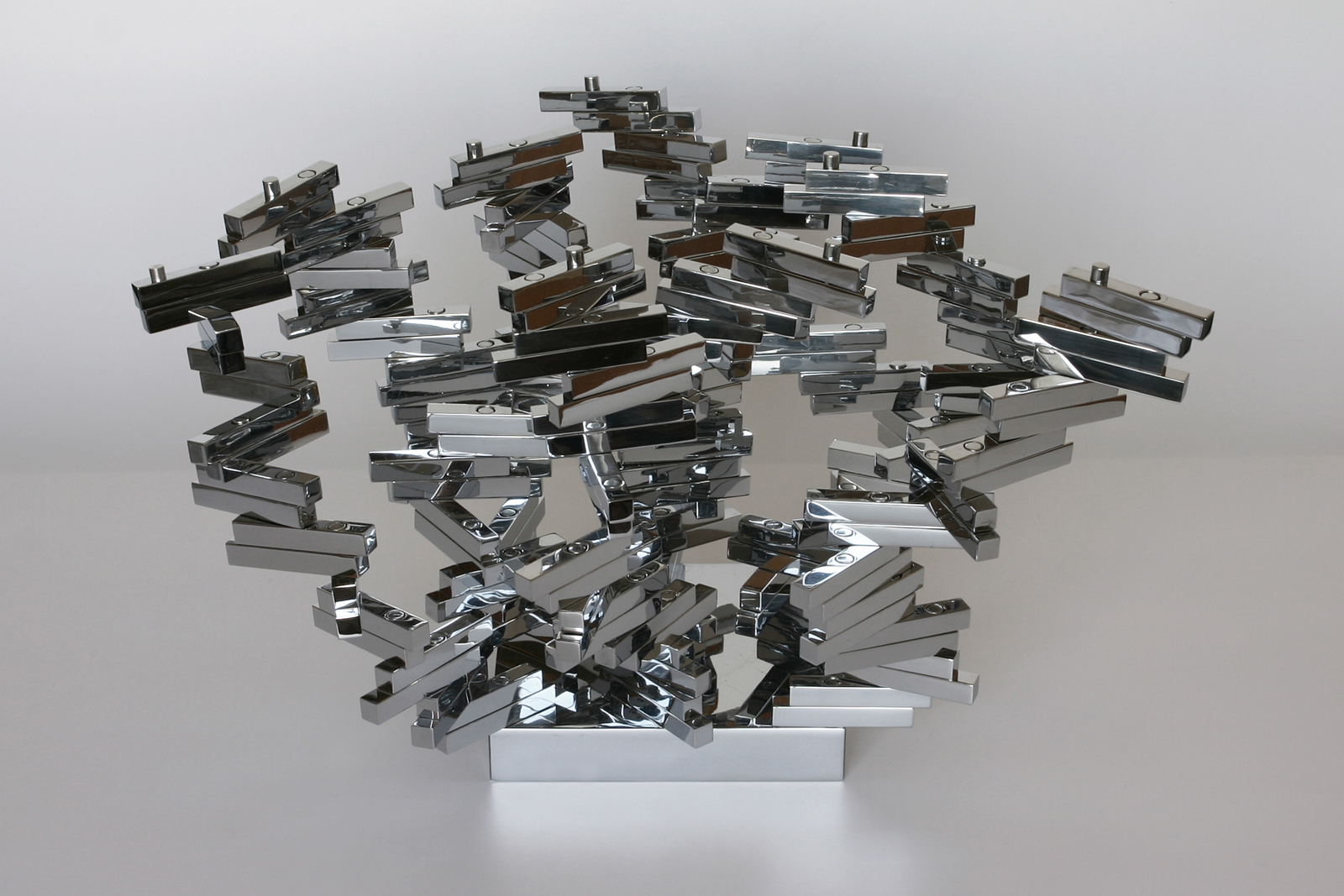
Radoslav Kratina, Metal variabil (1980s)

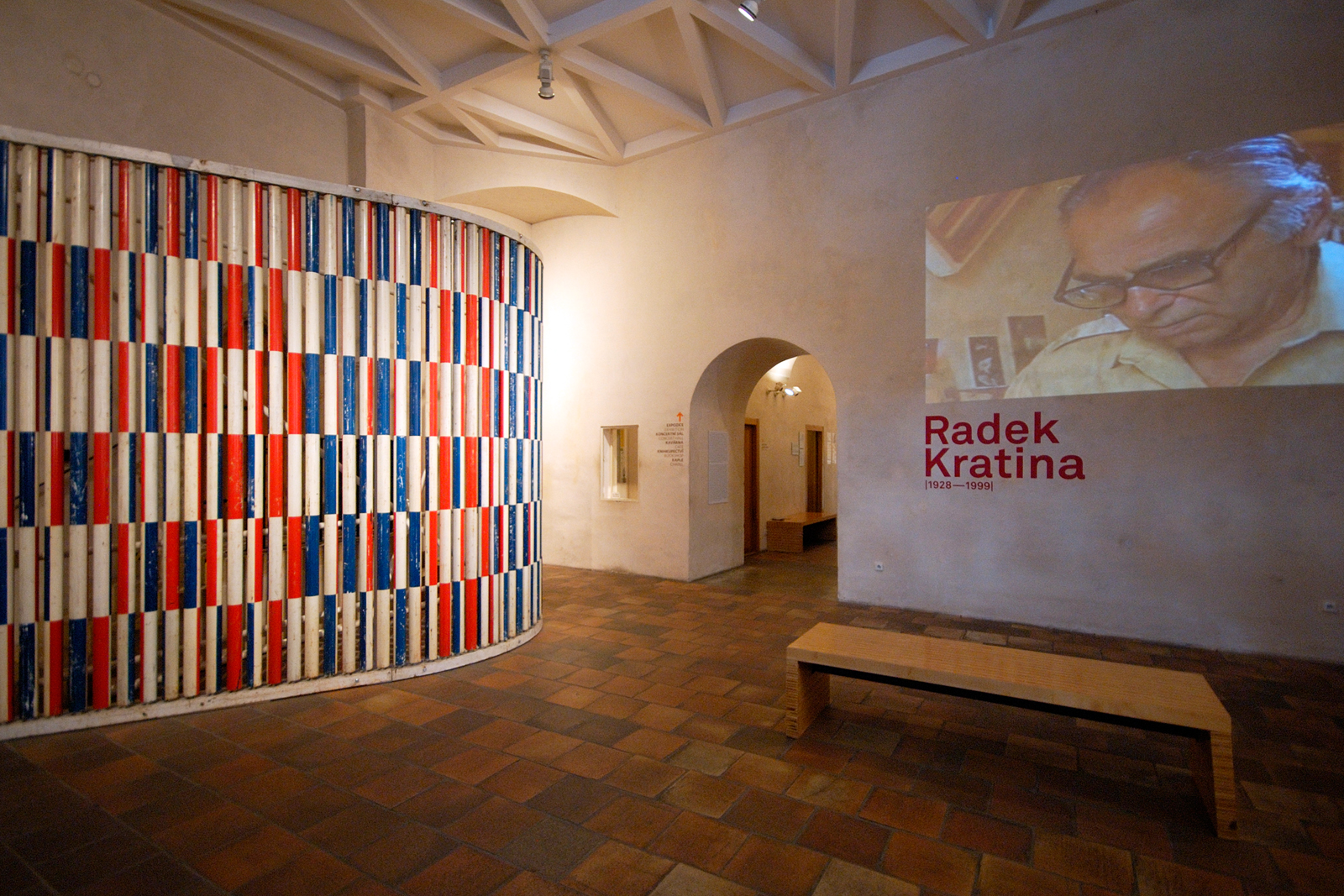
Radoslav Kratina, Transformable object (1983)

Kratina's variabils, which he himself called "a provider of possibilities", were created with the aim of involving the viewer in their transformation. He considered this to be a more humane and democratic idea than mere passive observation of kinetic sculpture. Ironically, however, Kratina was not allowed to exhibit throughout the normalization period (with the exception of a few exhibitions abroad) and his work was created in almost complete isolation. The artist sought aesthetic effect not in the monumental geometric forms of minimal art, but in the subtle nuances of the sculpture designed for interior. Similarly, he rejected the attractive dynamic drive of kinetic art in favour of modest manual combinatorics. These "toys for adults", as Arsén Pohribný called them, indeed offered endless possibilities of transformation. Kratina, however, puts limits on the anarchy of the game and insists on the moral qualities and his own responsibility for the commissioning of the elements of the game, as well as on the identity of the sculptural idea, which does not lose its individual character even in the face of the infinite possibilities of variations of a particular variabile.

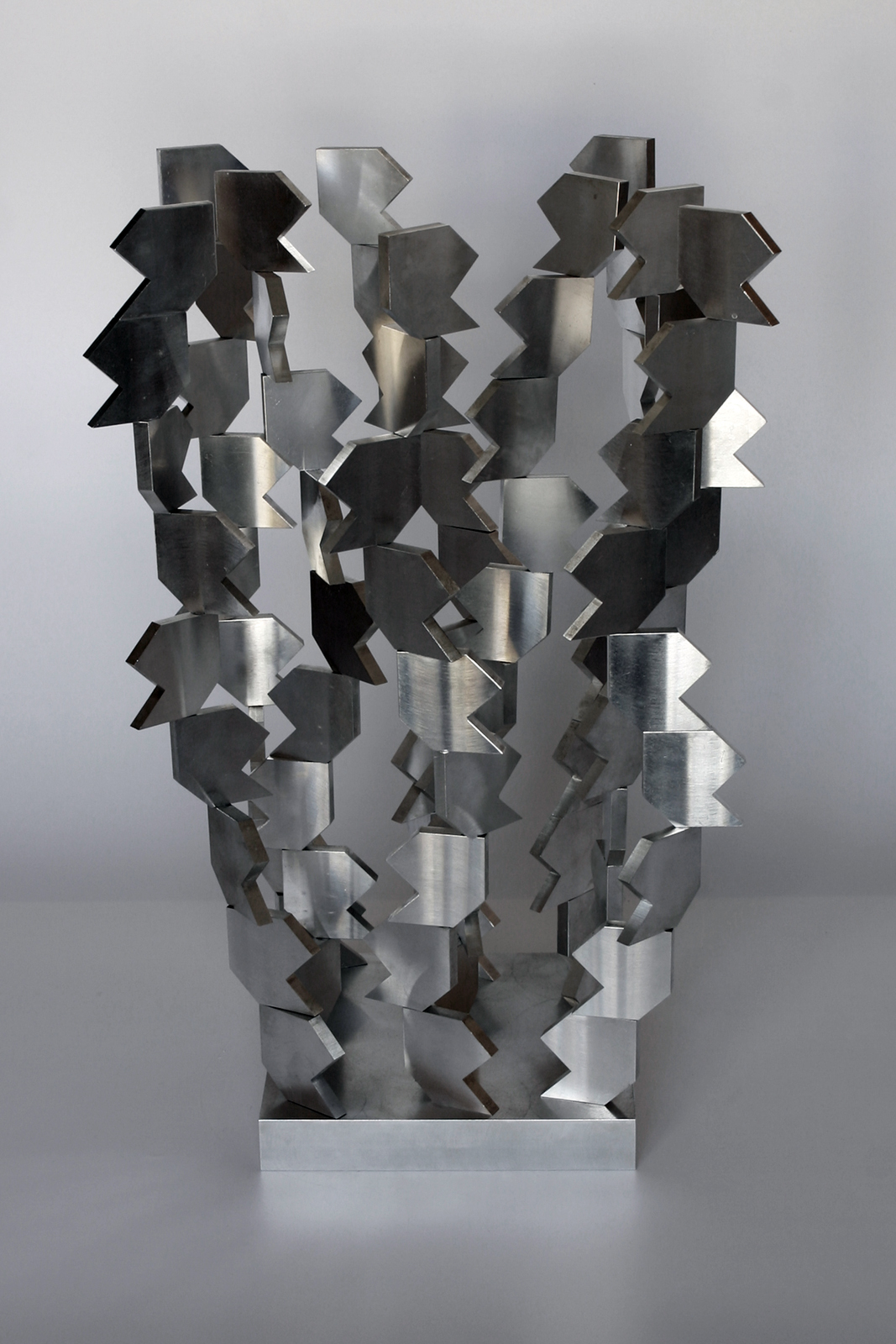
Radoslav Kratina, Metal variabil (late 1980s)

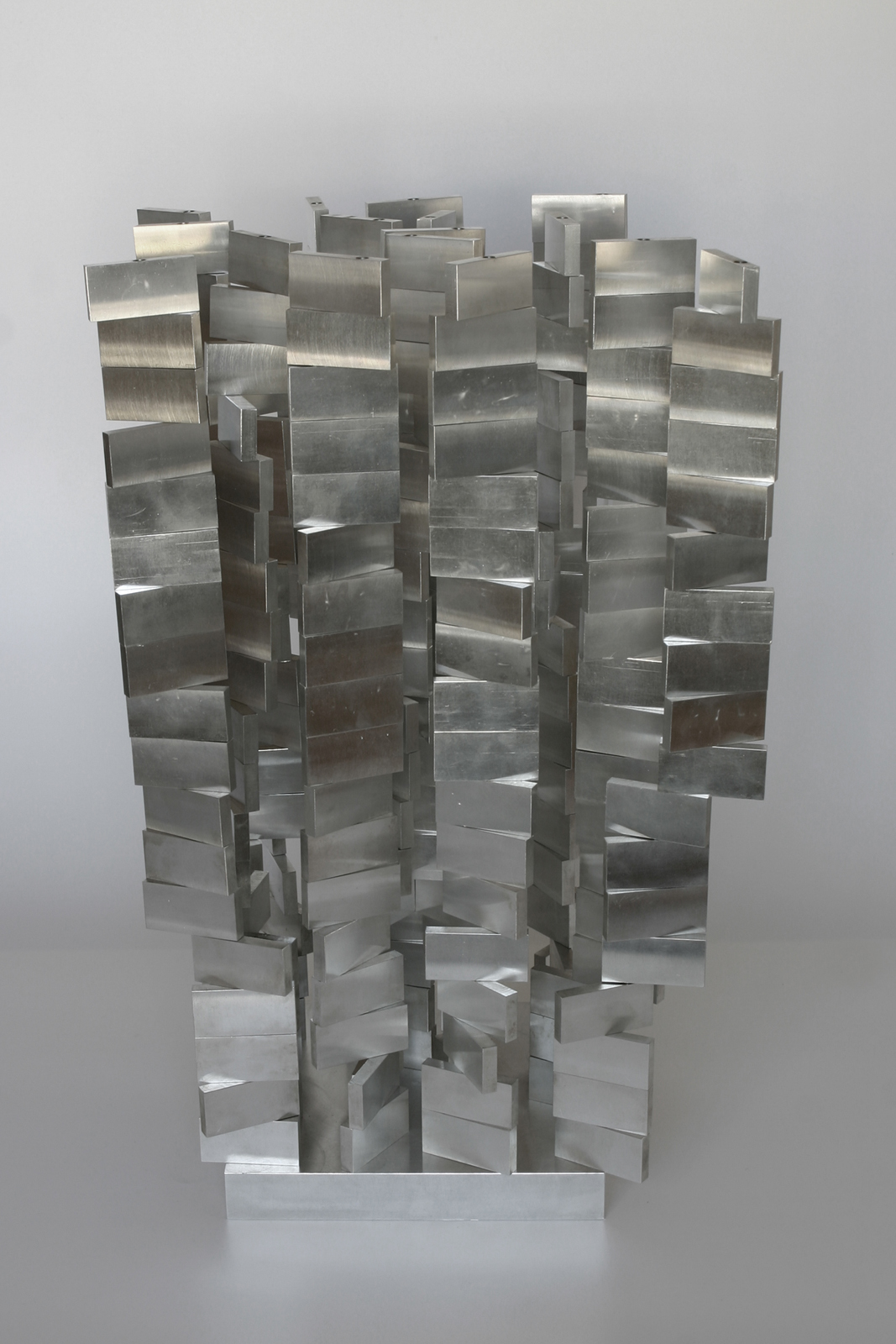
Radoslav Kratina, Metal variabil (1990s)

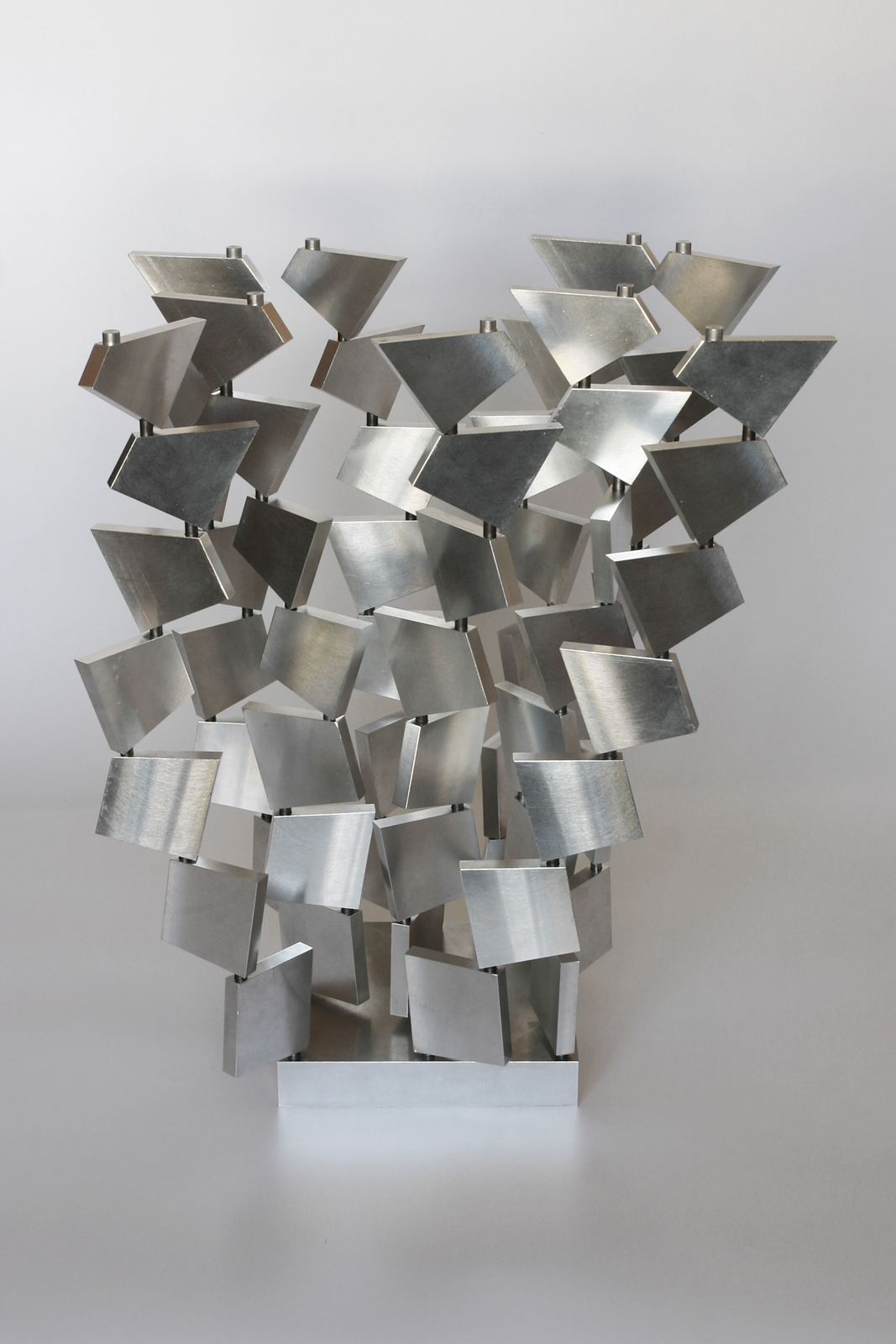
Radoslav Kratina, Metal variabil with rhomboidal elements (1995)

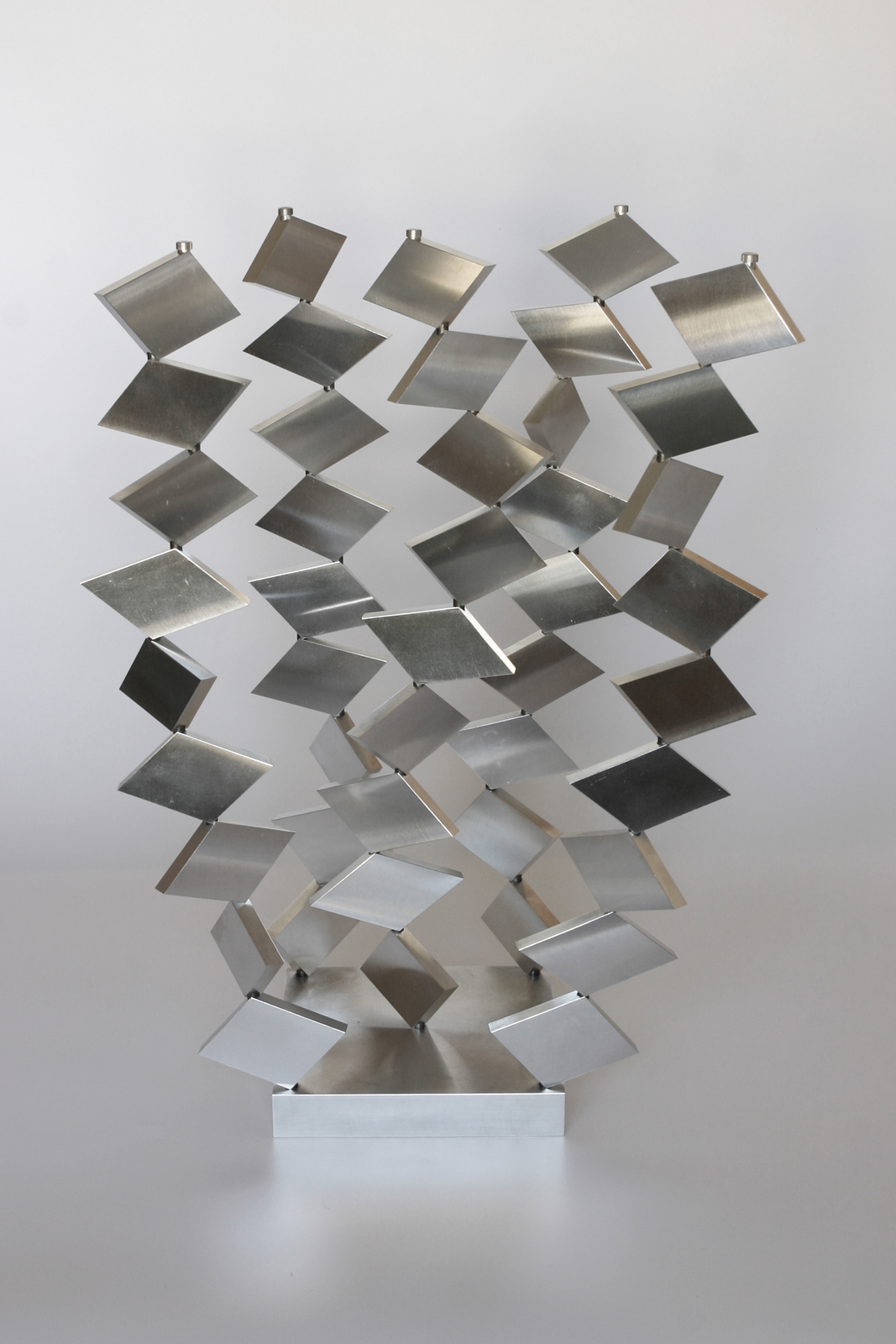
Radoslav Kratina, Variabil with square elements (1990s)

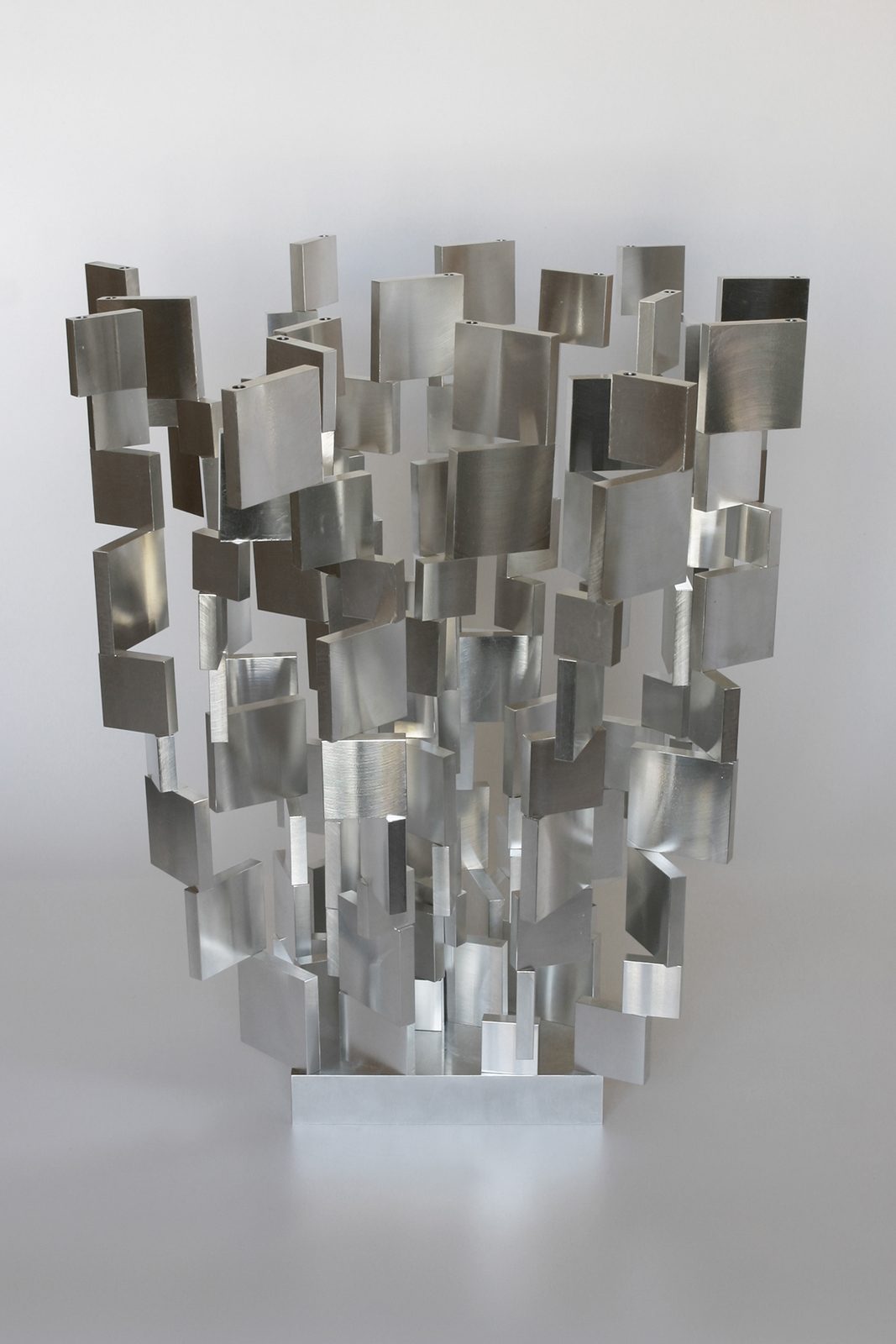
Radoslav Kratina, Square elements (1990s)

Unlike kinetic objects that are driven by a motor, this concept, which relies on the active involvement of the viewer in the process of creation, is quite unique. It is not the goal, but only a means to create the final version. In this, the variable objects are related to Kratina's former designs for children's toys, which had axes that allowed for different settings of the individual parts. Kratina's variabils are works with their own aesthetic appeal and geometric order, which do not aspire to resemble something real, but only depict themselves. What distinguishes a variabil from a classical sculpture is its interpenetration of space, similar to the construction of branches filling the inside of a tree's crown. Variabil articulates space and offers transparencies, subtle nuances of distances and relationships, intersections and crossings of bodies, contrasts and rhythms that can be perceived as spatial beauty full of excitement. The adjustability of the elements throughout the 360-degree range allows the use of a rich range of lights and shadows that rhythmize the surface of the object and complete the final impression. Objects whose basic formation is a loose grouping of elements easily exceed their basic dimension, sometimes by several times. The expansion into space is made possible either by the movable vertical axes on which the elements are strung, or by their connection by movable pins or telescopic extensions of the hollow elements. The mechanical principle of the additive assembly of geometric elements thus transcends the rigorous schemes of geometric abstraction and strangely grows into an organic principle of life and growth.

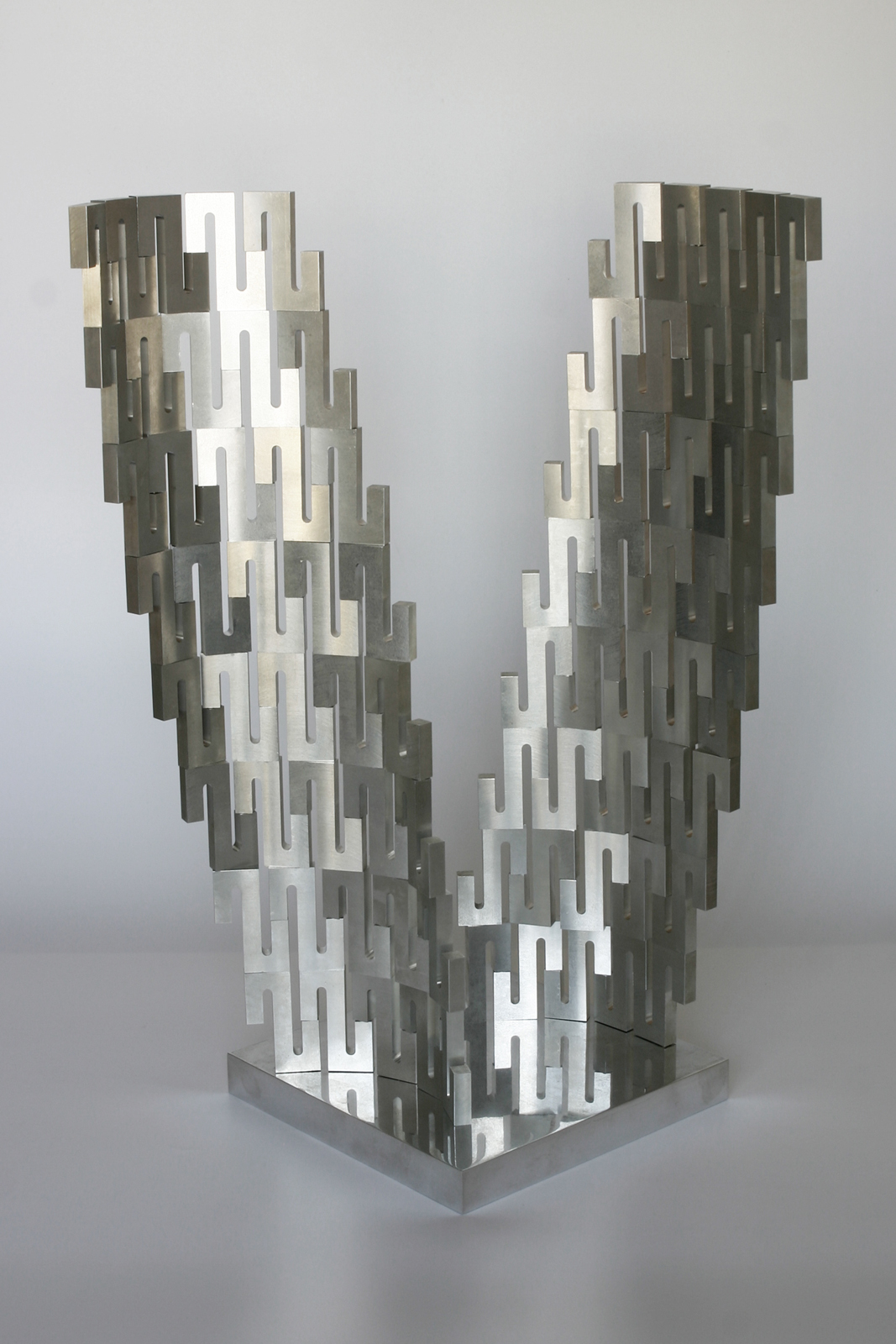
Radoslav Kratina, S-shaped elements (1990s)

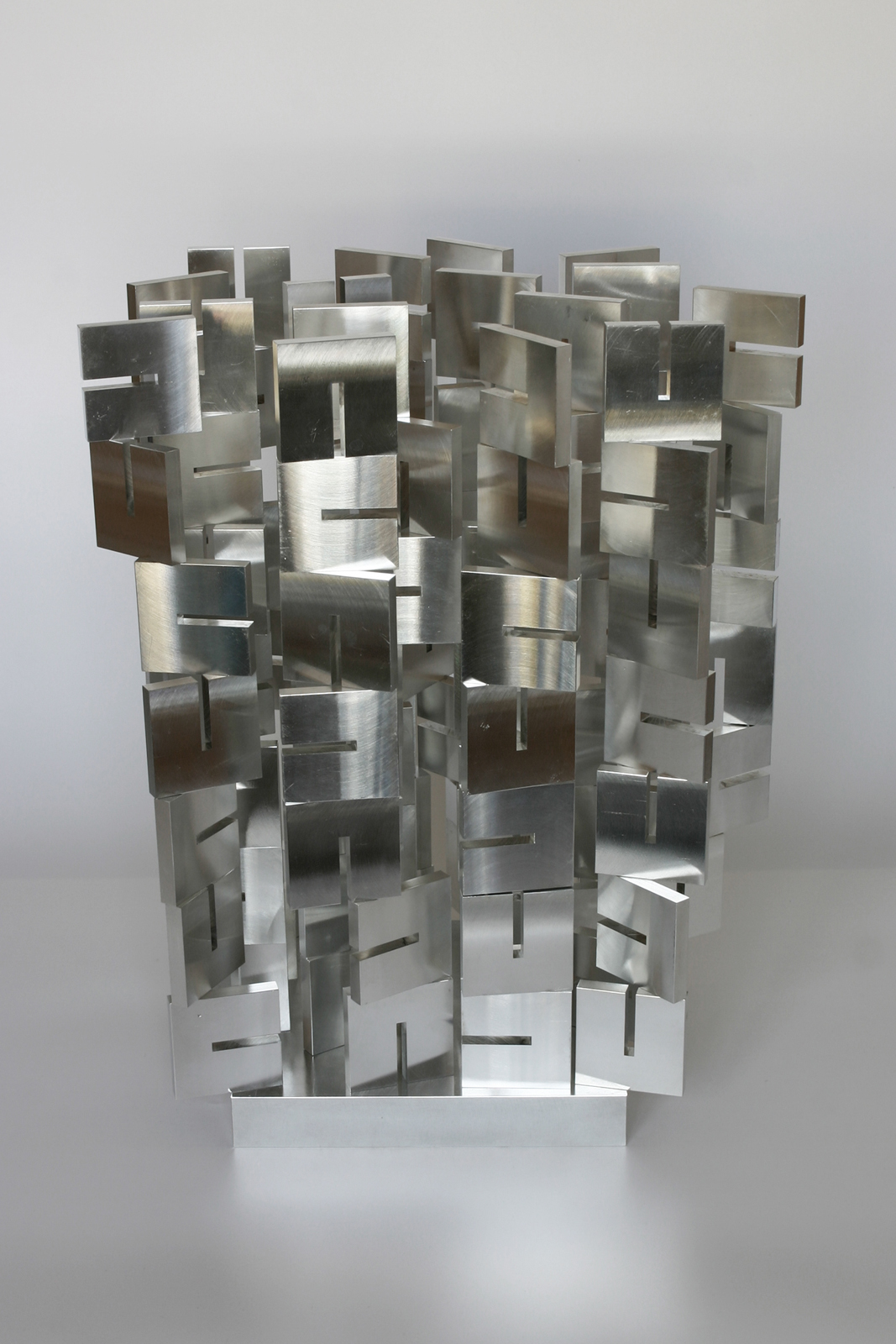
Radoslav Kratina, Square elements with a notch (undated)

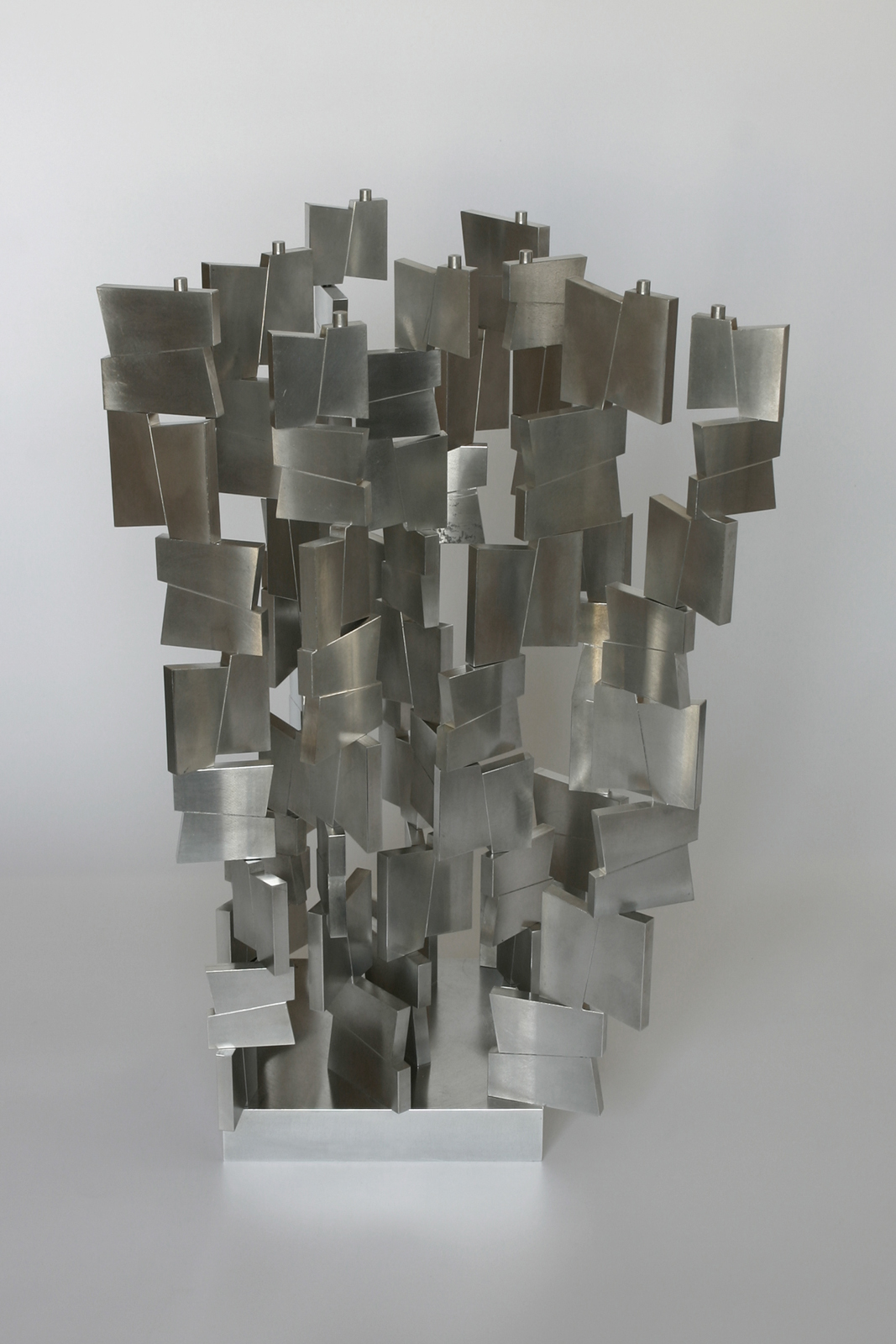
Radoslav Kratina, Metal variabil with nine axes (undated)

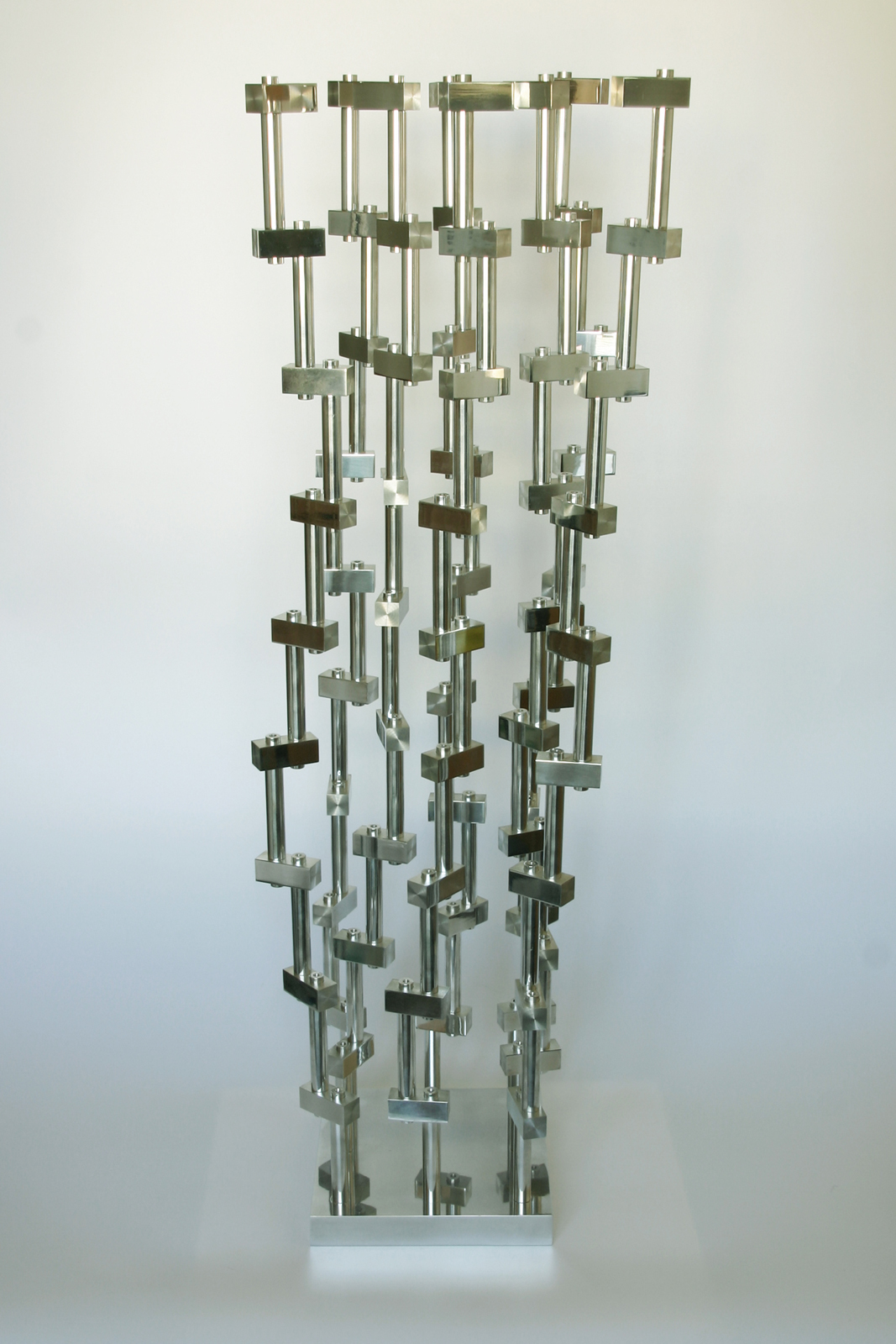
Radoslav Kratina, Metal variabil (undated)

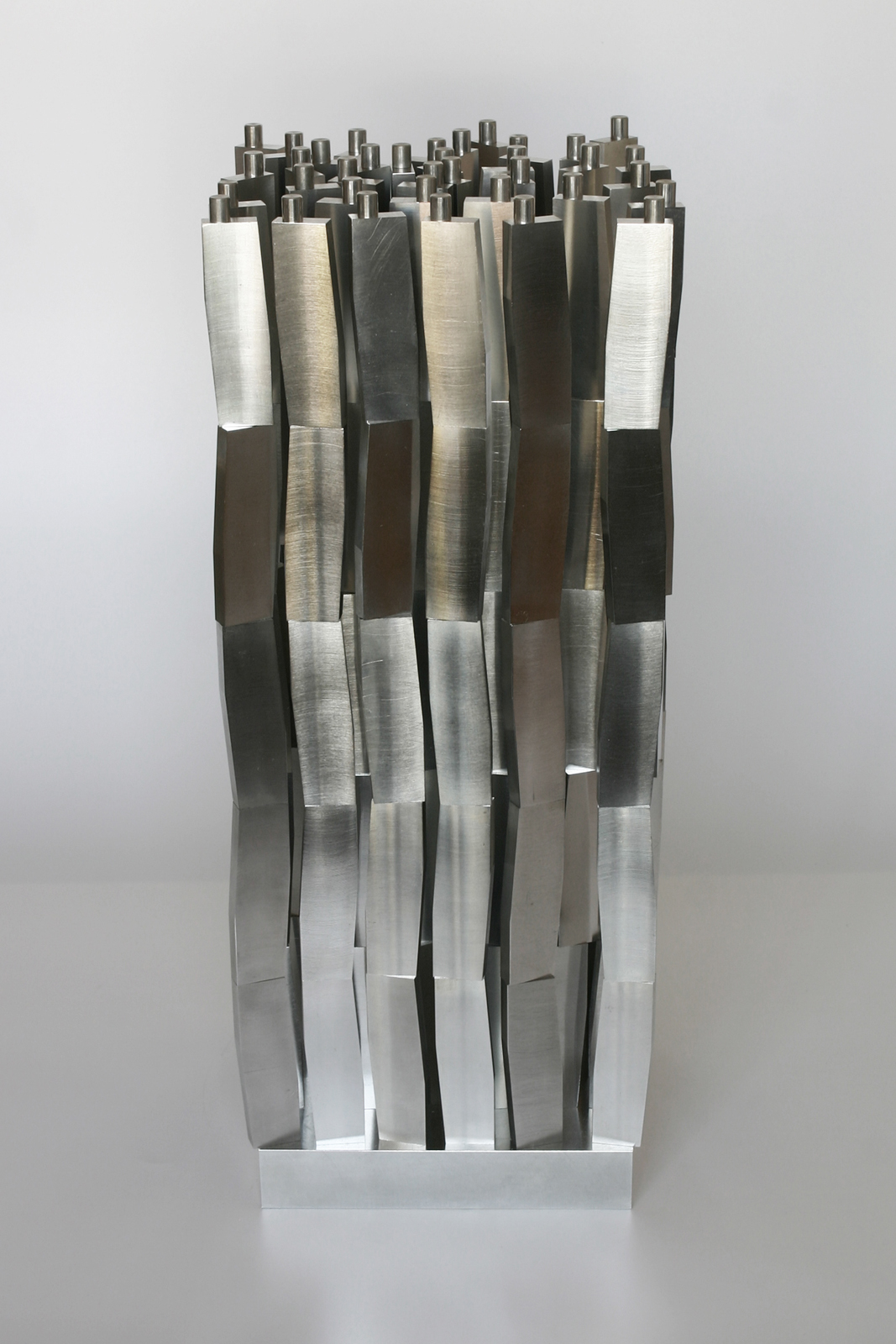
Radoslav Kratina, Metal variabil with 36 axes (undated)

Kratina's concept of creation is also unique in that the works have no beginning and no end and are conceived as a chained entity. The artist sometimes returns to variations of tried and tested solutions (Wooden Mane, 1967, Metal Mane, 1979), but his working method consists in the search for new rational constructions of objects. The works are deliberately not dated or signed, they allow for any foreign intervention and work with detached geometric shapes that can be easily replicated. They can be thrown into space and time without a name, like a ball. In addition to the aesthetic experience, they offer a sense of the manipulator and the experience of the game itself as a space of creativity and freedom. A structure composed of a large number of elements of the same kind or a limited number of several kinds is open to sensory perception and intellectual interpretation. Although transformable objects have no basic configuration, a state of maximum orderliness can be distinguished in them, which stands in contrast to other, more or less entropic variants.

While Kratina's wooden objects from the 1960s clearly belong to the decade in which they were created and are a rusticated variant of geometric art, his metal objects, in their multiplicity and morphological interrelatedness, move away from contemporary art and acquire a timeless validity. In the 1990s, geometric art showed an interest in the theme of irregularity and the loosening of regularly arranged structures, which was also reflected in Kratina's work. The variability of Kratina's objects, which made his works difficult to classify and somehow disturbing, belongs to a disparate stream of artistic expressions that are different in appearance, but aim at the same goal - a new search for the human place in the world, a new evaluation of all things and relationships, a re-examination of perceived connections and links, a primal wonder. Radoslav Kratina's objects have the ability to stand up to the art of his time and the art to come. They address man in the basic essentials of his existence, such as the interplay of sight and touch, the grasp of the object, the movement of the hands and the aesthetic experience of such a simple act.

=== Representation in collections ===
- National Gallery Prague
- Moravian Gallery in Brno
- City Museum of Brno
- Prague City Gallery
- Museum of Decorative Arts in Prague
- Klatovy / Klenová Gallery
- National Museum, Wrocław
- Museum of Art, Łódź
- Staatliche Kunstsammlungen Dresden
- Institut für moderne Kunst, Nuremberg
- Gallery of Art, Karlovy Vary
- Gallery of Visual Arts in Ostrava
- Museum Kampa
- Regional Gallery Liberec
- North Bohemian Art Gallery in Litoměřice
- West Bohemian Gallery in Plzeň
- Gallery of Benedikt Rejt, Louny
- Galerie Zlatá husa, Praha
- Regional Gallery of Highlands in Jihlava
- East Bohemian Gallery in Pardubice

=== Exhibitions (selection) ===
==== Solo (selection) ====
- 1966 Objects and Variabils by Radek Kratina, Theatre of Music, Ústí nad Labem
- 1967 Radek Kratina: Objects and Variabils 1963 - 1966, Regional Gallery of Highlands in Jihlava
- 1967 Radek Kratina: Objects, Variabils, Monotypes, Jaroslav Kral Gallery, Brno
- 1967 Radoslav Kratina, Galerie bratří Čapků, Prague
- 1967 Radek Kratina: Variabils, Benedikt Rejt Gallery, Louny
- 1969 Radek Kratina, Jiří Valenta, Tvář Gallery, Havířov, Workers' Club, Milevsko
- 1970 Demartini, Kratina, Alšova síň UB, Prague
- 1978 Radek Kratina: Objects, Variabils, Monotypes, Sonnenring Galerie, Rotemburg
- 1988 Zdeněk Sýkora: Paintings, Radek Kratina: Objects, with text by R. Kratina: Real Movement as a Possibility, Atrium, Prague
- 1989 Radek Kratina: Variabils and Objects, Kabinet of Applied Art, Brno
- 1990 Králík, Kratina, District Museum of Bohemian Paradise
- 1990 Zippe, Kratina, Art Gallery, Žďár nad Sázavou
- 1990 Zdeněk Prokop, 10 objects by R. Kratina, Jičín
- 1991 Zippe, Kratina, Galerie U bílého jednorožce, Klatovy, Czech Cultural Centre Bratislava, Tatra Gallery, Poprad
- 1991 Chatrný, Kratina, Karlovy Vary Art Gallery
- 1991 Radek Kratina: Transformation, Benedikt Rejt Gallery, Louny
- 1991 Radek Kratina: Variabils, Z-Galerie Operngasse, Vienna
- 1992 Cultural Centre of the Czechoslovakia, Berlin (with V. Hulík)
- 1993 Kratina, Pešek, Galerie Zámeček, Příbram
- 1994 Radek Kratina: Experimental Prints and Frottage from the 1960s, Letohrádek Ostrov
- 1995/96 Radoslav Kratina: Reliefs and Variable Objects, Exhibition Hall Sokolská 26, Ostrava
- 1996 Radoslav Kratina: Variable Objects, Langův dům Gallery, Frýdek-Místek
- 1998 Radoslav Kratina: Movement as Possibility, House of Art, Ostrava
- 2000 Radek Kratina: Idea con variazioni, Exhibition Hall Husova 19–21, Prague
- 2000 Radek Kratina (1928 - 1999): Selections from his life's work, Regional Gallery in Liberec
- 2004 Radek Kratina: Variabils and Monotypes, Galerie Montanelli, Prague
- 2005 Radek Kratina, Komart Gallery, Bratislava, Galerie am Festungsgraben, Berlin
- 2011 Radek Kratina, Dalibor Chatrný, Galerie Závodný, Mikulov
- 2012 Kratina in Dynamo, Dynamo design, Prague
- 2013 Radek Kratina (1928-1999), Dům U Kamenného zvonu, Prague
- 2017 Radek Kratina: Konstanty a proměnné / Constants and Variables, Museum Kampa, Praha

==== Collective (selection) ====
- 1958 Expo 58, Brussels
- 1964, 1966 Jazz in Fine Arts, Theatre of Music, Prague
- 1967 Mostra d´arte contemporanea cecoslovacca, Castello del Valentino, Turin
- 1967 Klub der Konkretisten, Alpbach
- 1967 Premi Inernacional Dibuix Joan Miró, Barcelona
- 1968 5 Künstler aus Prag, Paderborn, Medebach
- 1968/69 Club der Konkretisten Prag, Galerie im Hause Behr, Stuttgart, Galerie Mahlerstrasse, Vienna
- 1968 II. Międzynarodowe Biennale Plakatu, Warsaw 1968
- 1969 Klub konkrétistů, Galerie Pluymen, Nijmegen, Bratislava
- 1969 Club van Konkretisten Praag, Tiffany's Gallery, Den Haag
- 1969 5 Künstler aus Prag, Kassel, Paderborn
- 1969 22 grafici della Cecoslovacchia, Libreria Feltrinelli, Firenze
- 1969 Klub konkretistu Cekoslovacchia, Galleria Fiamma Vigo, Rome, Turin
- 1969 Klub der Konkretisten, Galerie Mahlerstrasse, Wien, Tiffany's Gallery, Scheweningen
- 1969 Salon d´Asnieres Peintres et Sculptures d´Aujourd´hui Quatre Artistes Tchécoclovaques, Asnieres sur Seina
- 1969 Tendence 4, Zagreb
- 1970 Club van Konkretisten Praag, Heineken Galerij, Amsterdam, Galerie de Bazuin, Harlingen
- 1970 Expo 70, Osaka
- 1971 Klub der Konkretisten: Objekte und Graphik, Galerie Interior, Frankfurt
- 1971 Konstruktive Kunst aus der CSSR, Galerie Sabine Vitus, Nuremberg
- 1972 35 artisti cecoslovacchi contemporanei Grafica e oggetti, Unimedia Galeria d´arte contemporanea, Genoa
- 1974 Tschechische Künstler, Galerie Wendtorf-Swetec, Düsseldorf
- 1980 Die Kunst Osteuropas im 20. Jahrhundert, Garmisch-Partenkirchen
- 1984 Zeitgenössische Kunst der ČSSR, Galerie Dialog e. V., Berlín
- 1985 Konstruktive Tendenzen II, Galerie Dialog e. V., Berlín
- 1987 Klub der Konkretisten 1967 - 1987, Objekte und Grafiken, Galerie Rafay, Kronberg
- 1990 Neue Blätter aus der ČSSR, Kupferstichkabinett, Dresden
- 1991 Hýbače, Východoslovenská galéria, Košice, Galéria Gerulata, Bratislava, NTM Prague
- 1992 Nová geometrie / New Geometry, National Technical Museum (Prague)
- 1992 Arte contemporanea ceca e slovacca 1950 - 1992, Palazzo del Broletto, Novara
- 1992/2003 Minisalon, Galerie Nová síň, Praha, Mons, New York, Hollywood, Cincinnati, Indianapolis, Chicago, Rapids, Albuquerque, Forth Myers, Columbia, North Dartmouth, Saint Petersburg, Prague, Brussels, Jakarta, Ubud, Surabaya, Paris
- 1992 Radoslav Kratina, Viktor Hulík: Variabils, Bewegnung in Objekten und Collagen, Galerie 2 G - Gegenwart, Berlin
- 1992 Situation Pragoise, Galerie Le Manoir, Ville de Martigny
- 1993 Geometria Bohemia: Tschechische Geometrie / Cseh Geometrikus Müvészet, Műcsarnok, Kunsthalle Budapest
- 1993 Inter - Kontakt - Grafik - Praha ’93, Mánes, Prague
- 1993 Výstava současného českého sochařství / Exhibition of the contemporary Czech sculpture, Mánes, Prague
- 1994 Zwischen Zeit Raum I, Galerie Wendtorf-Swetec, Düsseldorf
- 1994/95 Nová citlivost / New sensitivity, Severočeská galerie výtvarného umění v Litoměřicích, Dům U Jonáše, Pardubice, Oblastní galerie Vysočiny v Jihlavě, Dům umění města Opavy, Pražákův palác, Brno, Olomouc
- 1997/99 Klub konkrétistů / Club of concretists, Oblastní galerie Vysočiny v Jihlavě, Dům umění, Zlín, Galerie výtvarného umění v Ostravě, Oblastní galerie v Liberci, Klatovy, Alšova jihočeská galerie, Hluboká, Slovenská národná galéria, Bratislava, Stockholm
- 1998/2000 Česká serigrafie / Czech serigraphy, Galerie výtvarného umění v Ostravě, Staroměstská radnice, Praha, Dům umění města Opavy, Galerie moderního umění v Hradci Králové, Dům umění, Zlín, Štátna galéria, Banská Bystrica
- 1999 Umění zrychleného času. Česká výtvarná scéna 1958 - 1968 / The Art of Accelerated Time. Czech Art Scene 1958 - 1968, Prague, Cheb
- 2000 Schenkungen, Museum Bochum
- 2001 Serigrafia dall´Europa centrale / Siebdruck aus Miiteleuropa, Palais Esplanade, Merano
- 2003/4 Ejhle světlo / Look Light, Moravian Gallery in Brno, Prague castle riding hall, Prague
- 2005 Emigration out/in 1: Běla Kolářová, Jiří Kolář, Radek Kratina, Hugo Demartini, Saarländische Galerie – Europäisches Kunstforum e.V., Berlin
- 2006 Weltanschauung, Palazzo Belmonte Riso, Palermo
- 2008 International triennale of contemporary art 2008, National Gallery Prague
- 2010 New Sensitivity, National Art Museum of China, Beijing

== Sources ==
=== Monographs ===
- Hana Larvová (ed.), Radek Kratina (1928 -1999), Gallery, Praha 2013, ISBN 978-80-86990-23-1

=== Author´s catalogues (selection) ===
- Kratina v Dynamu, text Zbyněk Sedláček, Dynamo Design, Prague 2012
- Radek Kratina: Variabily a monotypy, text Jiří Machalický, Museum Montanelli, Prague 2004
- Radek Kratina 1928 - 1999: Idea con variazioni, Hlaváček J a kol., cat. 76 p., Prague, 2000
- Radoslav Kratina: Transformovatelné objekty, cat. 20 p., Kaliba, Prague, 1998
- Radoslav Kratina: Experimentální grafika 60. let a transformovatelné objekty, cat. 20 p., Kaliba, Prague, 1995
- Radek Kratina: Experimentální otisky a frotáže z 60. let, text Zbyněk Sedláček, Galerie umění Karlovy Vary (letohrádek Ostrov), 1994
- Radek Kratina, cat. 16 p., Galerie Benedikta Rejta, Louny, 1991
- Radoslav Kratina, cat. 12 s., Správa kulturních zařízení MK SR, Bratislava, 1991
- Radoslav Kratina: Objekty, cat. 12 p., Muzeum Českého ráje, Turnov 1990
- Radek Kratina: Variabily, Holešovský K, cat. 48 p., angl. č. fr. rus., Moravská galerie Brno 1989
- Radek Kratina: Objekty, Kratina R, Valoch J, cat. 52 p., č. něm., Atrium, Prague 1988
- Kratina, text Kříž J, cat. 28 p., Sonnenring Galerie, Rotemburg, 1978
- Radek Kratina: Objekty a variabily 1963–1966, Pohribný A, kat. 28 p., cs. de., OGV v Jihlavě, 1967
- Kratina, text Kratina R, Pohribný A, Dům umění města Brna 1967
- Kratina, Pohribný A, cat. 16 p., cs. de. fr., GJK, Brno, 1967
- Radek Kratina, Valoch J, cat. 12 p., GBR Louny, 1967
- Objekty a variabily Radka Kratiny, Pohribný A, cat. 12 p., DKP Ústí n/L, 1966

=== Collective catalogues (selection) ===
- New Sensitivity, 2010, Knížák M et al., 189 p., eng. cz. Chinese, NG in Prague, ISBN 9788070354421
- Czech Collage, 2010, Machalický J, 254 p., Gallery, Prague
- Movement as a Message (International Triennale of Contemporary Art), 2008, Barbero G et al., 216 p., eng. it., NG in Prague, ISBN 978-88-95894-09-6
- Soustředěný pohled / Focused View, 2007, Drury RF a kol., 179 p., eng. cz., Rada galerií ČR, Praha, ISBN 978-80-903422-2-4
- Weltanschauung: Anthology of the 20/21 Century, 2006, 256 p., eng., Palermo, ISBN 3-89929-096-8
- Šedesátá / The sixties, 2004, Juříková M, Železný V, 414 p., eng. cz., Galerie Zlatá husa, Praha, ISBN 80-239-3406-6
- Art is Abstraction: Czech Visual Culture of the Sixties, 2004, ed: Primus Z, 328 p., ISBN 80-86300-31-5 (Arbor vitae), ISBN 80-86217-28-0 (Kant)
- The Message of Another Expression (The Concept of Informel in Czech Art of the 1950s and the First Half of the 1960s), 1997,
- Nešlehová M, 286 p., English no., Artefact, Prague, ISBN 80-902481-0-1 (BASE), ISBN 80-902160-0-5 (ARTEFACT)
- Czech Graphic Art of the 1960s, 1994, Machalický J, 79 p., eng., National Gallery Prague, ISBN 80-7035-063-6
- Minisalon, 1992, Skalník J, 249 p., Jazz Section, Prague
- Statements of Art, 1991, Hlaváček J, 240 p., SČ publishing house, Ústí n/L, ISBN 80-7047-042-9
- L´art aujourd´hui en Tchecoslovaquie, 1979, Bénamou G, 190 p., fr., BG, Paris
- Grey Brick 78/1985, Jazz Section, Prague 1985
- Klub der Konkretisten Prag, text by Erich Witz, 24 p., Wien 1969
- The Concretists Club, 1968, Pohribný A, 96 p., cz. fr., OGV in Jihlava
- Graphics 65, 1965, Zemina J, 30 p., Homeland History Museum Písek

=== Encyclopedias ===
- Kdo je kdo / Who is who Česká republika, Federální orgány ČSFR 91/92 (I. díl A-M), Nakladatelství Kdo je kdo, Prague 1991
- Grafika (Obrazová encyklopedie české grafiky osmdesátých let / Pictorial Encyclopaedia of the Eighties), Středoevropská galerie a nakladatelství, Prague 1993
- Kdo je kdo / Who is who v České republice (94/95), Modrý jezdec, spol. s r.o., Prague 1994
- Nová encyklopedie českého výtvarného umění / New Encyclopedia of Czech Fine Arts (A-M), Academia, nakladatelství Akademie věd České republiky, Prague 1995
- Signatury českých a slovenských výtvarných umělců, Výtvarné centrum Chagall, Ostrava 1995
- Všeobecná encyklopedie ve čtyřech svazcích / General encyclopedia in four volumes (2: g/l), Nakladatelský dům OP, Prague 1996
- Český biografický slovník XX. století (II. díl K-P) / Czech Biographical Dictionary of the 20th Century (Volume II K-P), Nakladatelství Paseka s.r.o., Prague 1999
- Slovník českých a slovenských výtvarných umělců 1950–2001 / Dictionary of Czech and Slovak Visual Artists 1950-2001 (VI. Kon – Ky), Výtvarné centrum Chagall, Ostrava 2001

=== Theses and dissertations ===
- Kateřina Rusoová, Variabils by Radek Kratina, diploma thesis, SDU, FF MUNI in Brno 2010
- Michaela Ečerová, Exhibition New Sensitivity, bachelor thesis, FF MUNI in Brno, 2010
- Zuzana Krišková, Radoslav Kratina, in: Object and New Sensitivity, thesis UDU, FF MUNI, Prague 2017, pp. 61–62
- Helena Málková, Creator of Variabils, Radoslav Kratina, in: Multiplication of Shape as a Means to Construct Reality, PedF UK Prague 2017, pp. 24–29

=== Articles (selection) ===
- Zdeněk Felix, Klub konkrétistů, Výtvarná práce 5, 1968/03/27, p. 5
- Arsén Pohribný, Kratina's Variables, Výtvarné umění 3, 1968/06/30
- Klub konkretistů vystavoval v dubnu ve Stuttgartu.../ Concretists Club exhibited in Stuttgart in April..., Výtvarná práce 11, 1968/06/25, p. 2
- Arsén Pohribný, Van constructivisme naar concrete kunst in Tsjecho-slowakije, Museumjournaal 13/1, 1968
- Karel Trinkewitz, Det skönas möjligheter, Livet i Tjeckoslovakien 1969, p. 28-29
- Erich Witz, Gemachte Welt, Im Herzen Europas 1969/6, p. 13-15
- Karel Trinkewitz, Les possibilities du beau, La Vie Tchecoslovaque 1969/04, p. 28-29
- Pavel Štěpánek, Arte attualle in Cecoclovacchia, D'Ars, Milan, 12, 1971, p. 56-57
- Hartmut Böhm, European relief-structure Artists, The Unilever Series: Rachel Whiteread, TATE Modern 1971, p. 70-79
- Vladimir Malekovič, Suvremena češka i slovačka avantgarda. Radek Kratina i praški konkretisti, Život umjetnosti 18, 1972, p. 68-78
- Radek Kratina: Sculpture: My transformables of 1973–76, Leonardo, International Journal of the Contemporary Artist 10/1, 1977, p. 42-43
- Geneviève Bénamou, Radek Kratina fait partie du grupe..., L'art aujourd'hui en Tchecoslovaquie, 1979, p. 14-15
- Jiří Hůla, Galerie (Radoslav Kratina), Elektronika 1987/07/20, p. 48
