= Dadamaino =

Italian visual artist and painter

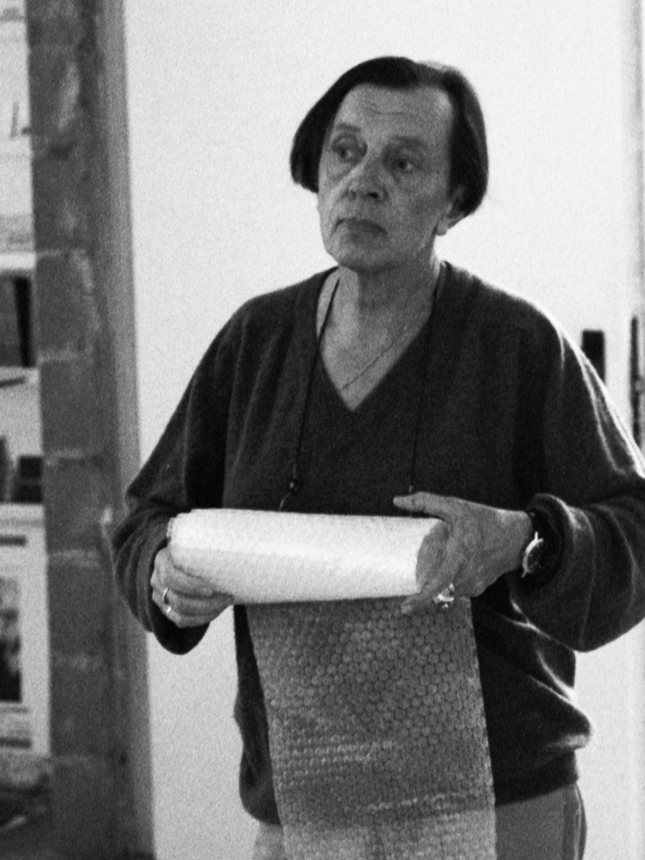
- Dadamaino (1994)
- Born: Eduarda Emilia Maino; 2 October 1930; Milan, Italy
- Died: 13 April 2004 (aged 73); Milan, Italy

Eduarda Emilia Maino (2 October 1930 – 13 April 2004), known as Dadamaino, was an Italian visual artist and painter. She was a member of the Milanese avant-garde of the 1960s.

== Biography ==
Eduarda Emilia Maino, nicknamed "Dada", was born in Milan. She first completed a medical degree before taking up art at the end of the 1950s. She frequented a group of young artists who followed Lucio Fontana and the spatialism movement, including Piero Manzoni, Gianni Colombo, Enrico Castellani and Agostino Bonalumi.

In 1958, Dadamaino produced a series of works called Volumi, which were exhibited in her first solo show at Galleria dei Bossi in Milan the same year.

Shortly after, Dadamaino joined Azimuth, a group funded by Piero Manzoni, and the Germany-based Group Zero formed by Heinz Mack, Otto Piene and Günther Uecker.

In the following years Dadamaino conducted important visual experiments, among them the occupation with color grading and interferences between 1966 and 1968. She intensively examined the effects of spectral colors to which she added black, white and brown in order to interrelate them. In 1967, at the peak of this development, she made her well known "ricerca del colore" (Color Research), a series of squared plates where she analyzed the reciprocal effect of color and form, by grading each color in light and dark shades and contrasting it in lamellar stripes, creating motion in the observer's eye.

Dadamaino's work was included in the 2021 exhibition Women in Abstraction at the Centre Pompidou.

== Exhibitions ==
Dadamaino had two solo shows at the Venice Biennale in 1980 and in 1990.

- 1962 : Nul group exhibition, Stedelijk Museum, Amsterdam, Netherlands
- 1983 : Retrospective, Padiglione d’Arte Contemporanea, Milan, Italy
- 2000 : Retrospective, Bochum museum, Bochum, Germany
- 2011 : "Volumes 1958-60", The Major Gallery, London, United Kingdom
- 2013 : Dadamaino, Le Consortium, Dijon, France
- 2013 : Dadamaino, Tornabuoni art, Paris, France
- 2017 : Dadamaino, Mendes Gallery, New York
- 2023 : Dadamaino 1930–2004, MA*GA, Gallarate

== Public Collections ==
- GAM, Turin
- MART, Rovereto
- Museo del Novecento, Milan
- Museion, Bolzano
- Musée de Grenoble, Grenoble
- Centre Pompidou, Paris
- Hilti Art Foundation, Liechtenstein
- Tate Modern, London
- Philadelphia Museum of Art, Philadelphia
- Guggenheim, Venice
- Kunstmuseum Reutlingen / konkret, Reutlingen
