= Artempo =

Venice art show

Coordinates: 45°26′7.29″N 12°19′55.42″E

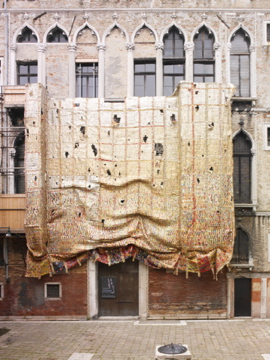
El Anatsui, Artempo, Palazzo Fortuny, Venice

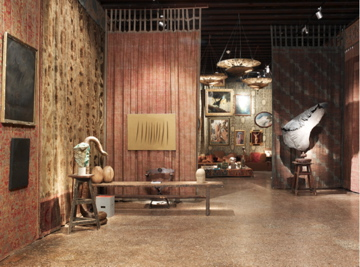
First Floor, Artempo, Palazzo Fortuny, Venice

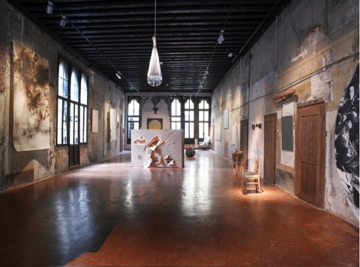
Second Floor, Artempo, Palazzo Fortuny, Venice

Artempo: Where Time Becomes Art was an encyclopedic art exhibition created for the Palazzo Fortuny, Venice in 2007. It examined the relationship between art and time, and the power of display.

The exhibition included variations of cultures and periods, and featured objects ranging from simple "objecte trouve", archaeological materials, applied art, old, classical, and modern art, to contemporary installations.

The exhibition was made by Mattijs Visser and Axel Vervoordt, together with Jean-Hubert Martin. The accompanying book included essays by philosopher Massimo Cacciari, the curator from Magiciens de la terre, Jean-Hubert Martin, the former director of Centre Georges Pompidou, Heinz-Norbert Jocks, as well as Eddi de Wolf and Visser.

== Palazzo Fortuny ==
Artempo was housed in the Venezian-Gothic Palazzo Fortuny, Mariano Fortuny's former home, studio, showroom, and "Think-Tank". Fortuny's own art ranged across many fields, and he was also an eclectic art-collector, as well as an organizer of lectures, concerts, and discussions. Artempo was designed with the spirit of Fortuny in mind, utilizing the Palazzo as a "Laboratory of Ideas".

In 2009 the Museum Palazzo Fortuny organized a second exhibition, titled In-Finitum, built around the ideas from Fortuny and Artempo.

== Artists ==
Along with objects from different periods and cultures, artists who were on display at Artempo were:

- Marina Abramović
- El Anatsui
- Arman
- Antonin Artaud
- Francis Bacon
- Erzsebet Baerveldt
- Hans Bellmer
- Alighiero Boetti
- Christian Boltanski
- Michael Borremans
- Louise Bourgeois
- André Breton
- Peter Buggenhout
- Alberto Burri
- Cai Guo-Qiang
- Enrico Castellani
- Loris Cecchini
- Tony Cragg
- Yael Davids
- Berlinde De Bruyckere
- Giorgio de Chirico
- Jean Dubuffet
- Marcel Duchamp
- Marlene Dumas
- Jan Fabre
- Robert Filliou
- Fischli & Weiss
- Lucio Fontana
- Mariano Fortuny
- Alberto Giacometti
- Gotthard Graubner
- Thomas Grünfeld
- Gutai
- Anish Kapoor
- On Kawara
- William Kentridge
- Kimsooja
- Yves Klein
- Bertrand Lavier
- Jean-Jacques Lebel
- Man Ray
- Piero Manzoni
- Gordon Matta-Clark
- Marisa Merz
- Sabrine Mezzaqui
- Tatsuo Miyajima
- Jorge Molder
- Sadamasa Motonaga
- Klaus Münch
- Saburo Murakami
- Roman Opalka
- Orlan
- Pablo Picasso
- Otto Piene
- Markus Raetz
- Robert Rauschenberg
- Charles Ross
- Medardo Rosso
- Thomas Ruff
- Claude Rutault
- Richard Serra
- Shozo Shimamoto
- Fujiko Shiraga
- Kazuo Shiraga
- Thomas Schütte
- Curt Stenvert
- Dominique Stroobant
- Shiro Tsujimura
- Antoni Tàpies
- James Turrell
- Günther Uecker
- Emilio Vedova
- Jef Verheyen
- Andy Warhol
- Adolfo Wildt
- Tsuruko Yamazaki
- ZERO
