= Knife Tree =

Sculpture by Heinz Mack

Coordinates: 43°10′37.0″N 87°56′12.7″W

- Artist: Heinz Mack
- Year: 1966
- Type: steel
- Dimensions: 280 cm × 38 cm (112 in × 15 in)
- Location: Lynden Sculpture Garden; Milwaukee, Wisconsin
- Owner: Bradley Family Foundation

Knife Tree is a public art work by German artist Heinz Mack located at the Lynden Sculpture Garden near Milwaukee, Wisconsin. The sculpture is an abstract spire with upper elements resembling a feather. It is made of steel plated with chrome; it is installed on the lawn.
