= Henk Peeters =

Dutch painter (1925–2013)

Henk Peeters (8 December 1925 – 13 April 2013) was a Dutch artist. He was an active member of the ZERO movement. Peeters was born in The Hague. He studied Fine Art at the Koninklijke Academie voor Beeldende Kunsten in The Hague and taught from 1957 until 1972 at the Art Academy in Arnhem, the Netherlands. Until his death (Hall (NL), 2013), Henk Peeters restored artworks from the Nul period and remained an active spokesman for the Nul group.

== Activities ==
Henk Peeters was the most active member of the Dutch Nul group, notably with regard to the organization; he made the international contacts, organized the international ZERO (Nul) exhibitions at the Stedelijk Museum Amsterdam, and wrote on the theory of art. It was also he who first actively participated in international exhibitions with artist groups such as the German ZERO, the Italian Azimuth, and with artists Yves Klein, Yayoi Kusama and Lucio Fontana. He initiated the (utopian) project "Zero on Sea", with more than fifty participating artists from over ten countries, and remained true to the fundamental concept of the Nul movement right up to his death in 2013. He sought to use his works of art to make the viewer conscious of his environment; he wanted to bring about a sensitive consciousness-raising, as it were. The materials that Peeters selected for his works frequently had a very tactile appeal, while he simultaneously created a certain untouchability; thus he stuck candle tapers behind plastic foil, or placed mesh in front of cotton wool. He also used fire on canvases, leaving behind traces of thick smoke, or burned holes into plastic, the so-called "Pyrographies". With these - often white - works he was visually closely related to the German ZERO artists, but there was also a clear relationship with Nouveau Realisme; Peeters also used ready-mades, which he bought in inexpensive stores and isolated in the work of art. In these, he had a preference for modern, clean, industrial materials, such as plastic and nylon. He once said: "with my work, I have always wanted it to look just as fresh as if it was in the HEMA (the Dutch chain store). It must not be artified... I had no need for artistic cotton wool". Henk Peeters also worked with natural processes, such as light and water reflections, and with ice, rain, snow and mist. Art and life should be joined inextricably. And thus, in 1961 Henk Peeters became a work of art himself, when Piero Manzoni appointed him as one; this was certified and signed by the Italian artist. Until his death (Hall (NL), 2013), Henk Peeters restored artworks from the Nul period and remained an active spokesman for the group.

== The Nul group ==
Together with Jan Henderikse, Armando and Jan Schoonhoven, Peeters formed the Nederlandse Nul-beweging in the 1960s. herman de vries joined the group for a short time. This group was opposed to the Cobra movement and wanted objective art, art that was divorced from any emotional value. Later on, the Nul movement joined up with the international ZERO movement. Members of this group included Lucio Fontana, Piero Manzoni, and Yves Klein.

== The Nul Research Institute ==
The 0-INSTITUTE, founded in 2005, has the task of researching, preserving and presenting the works and documents of artists associated with the international post-war ZERO movement and active in to evaluate the ideas of the movement and present them in a contemporary context. The ZERO foundation was established in 2008, a collaboration between the Düsseldorf ZERO artists with the Museum Kunstpalast. The ZERO foundation has the task of researching, preserving and presenting the works and documents of the German Zero group.
