= Dominique Stroobant =

Belgian sculptor and photographer

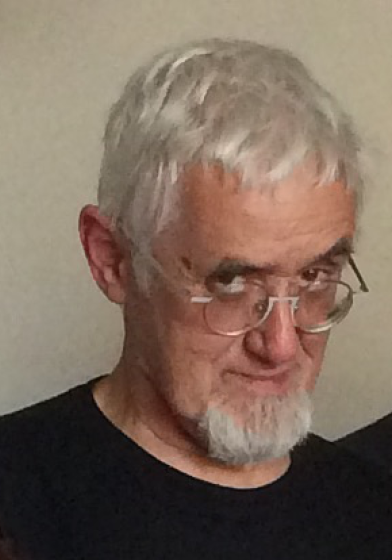
- Born: March 16, 1947 (age 79); Antwerp, Belgium
- Occupations: Photographer and sculptor
- Spouse: Mymona („Mona“) Johnson (m. 1973; died 1998)

Dominique Stroobant (born March 16, 1947) is a Belgian sculptor, photographer and graphic artist living in Italy.

== Life ==
Since 1970, he has resided and worked in the small hamlet of Miseglia, Carrara.

In 1972 he created with Kenneth Davis and Philippe Toussaint the Floating Stones Group.

In 1976 he started his collaboration with the enterprise Fratelli Biselli S.p.A., one of the first two to cut granite since the 1950s in Carrara.

With Paolo Gioli he was one of the photographer who developed pinhole photography in Europe. In 1977 he documented with his selft-built pinhole camera the movement of the sun.

He worked with Max Bill. Amongst their most important artwork is the sculpture Kontinuität in Frankfurt.

He has been a friend and collaborator of ZERO artist Jef Verheyen.

In 1988 he carved a memorial for the casualties of the 1956 mining accident of Marcinelle, inside the site of the coal mine.

In 2013 he was the moderator at the round table discussion "Visivi. La fotografia attraverso i linguaggi contemporanei" ("Visual. Photography through contemporary languages"), in Florence at Museo Galileo.

== Work ==
In his early years, Stroobant gained recognition for exploring the reuse of industrial materials. However, he later shifted his focus to political and philosophical themes.

Everyone at Carrara knows that stone weeps. ... All of us have experienced how alive stones are, that they behave like sponges, can bend, expand and that they have a voice ... for one who listens

— Dominique Stroobant,

Another pivotal aspect of his work is the integration of scientific principles into art.

== Gallery ==
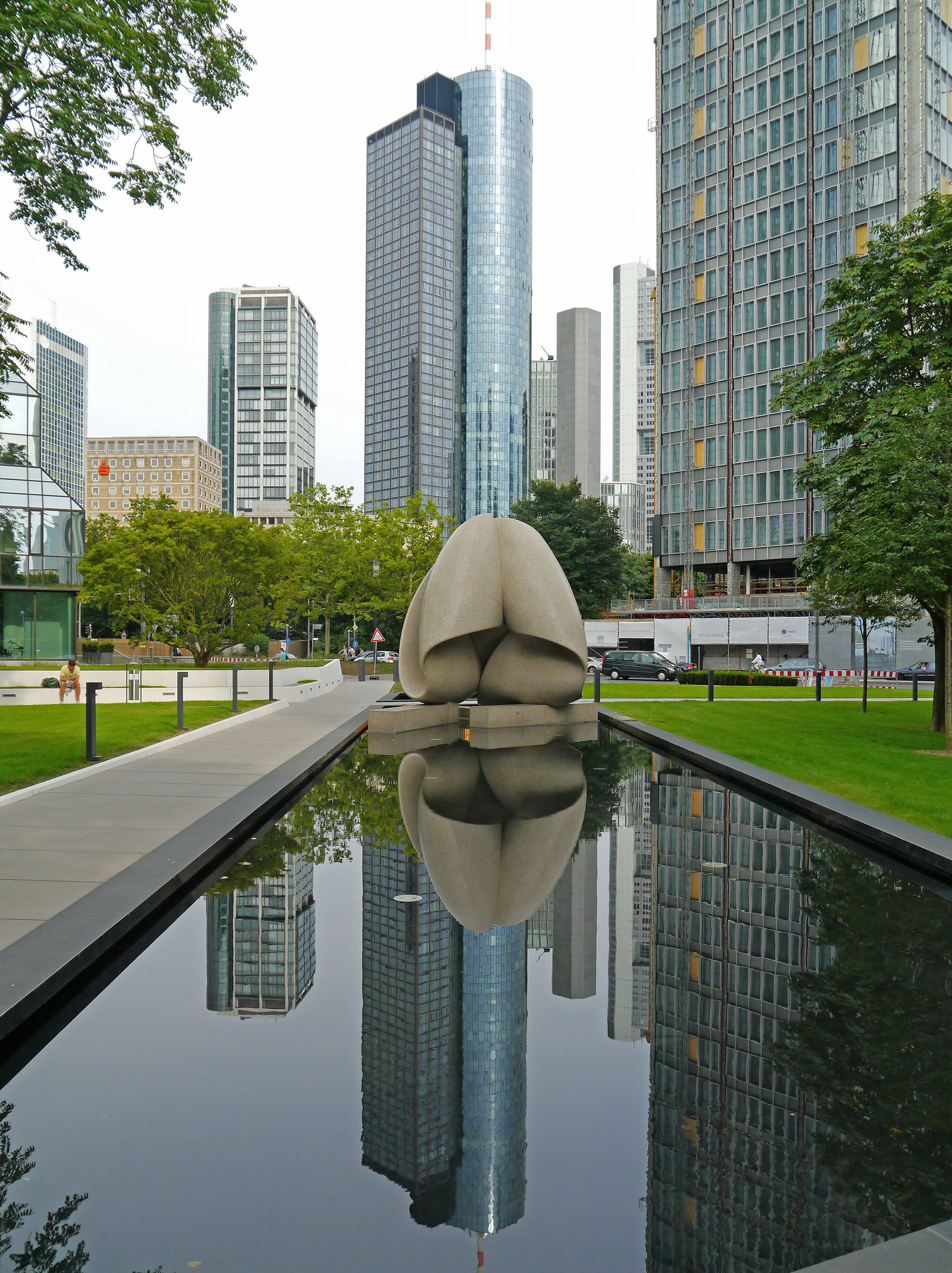
Kontinuität, Max Bill and Dominique Stroobant, 1983-1986 based on a project of 1947

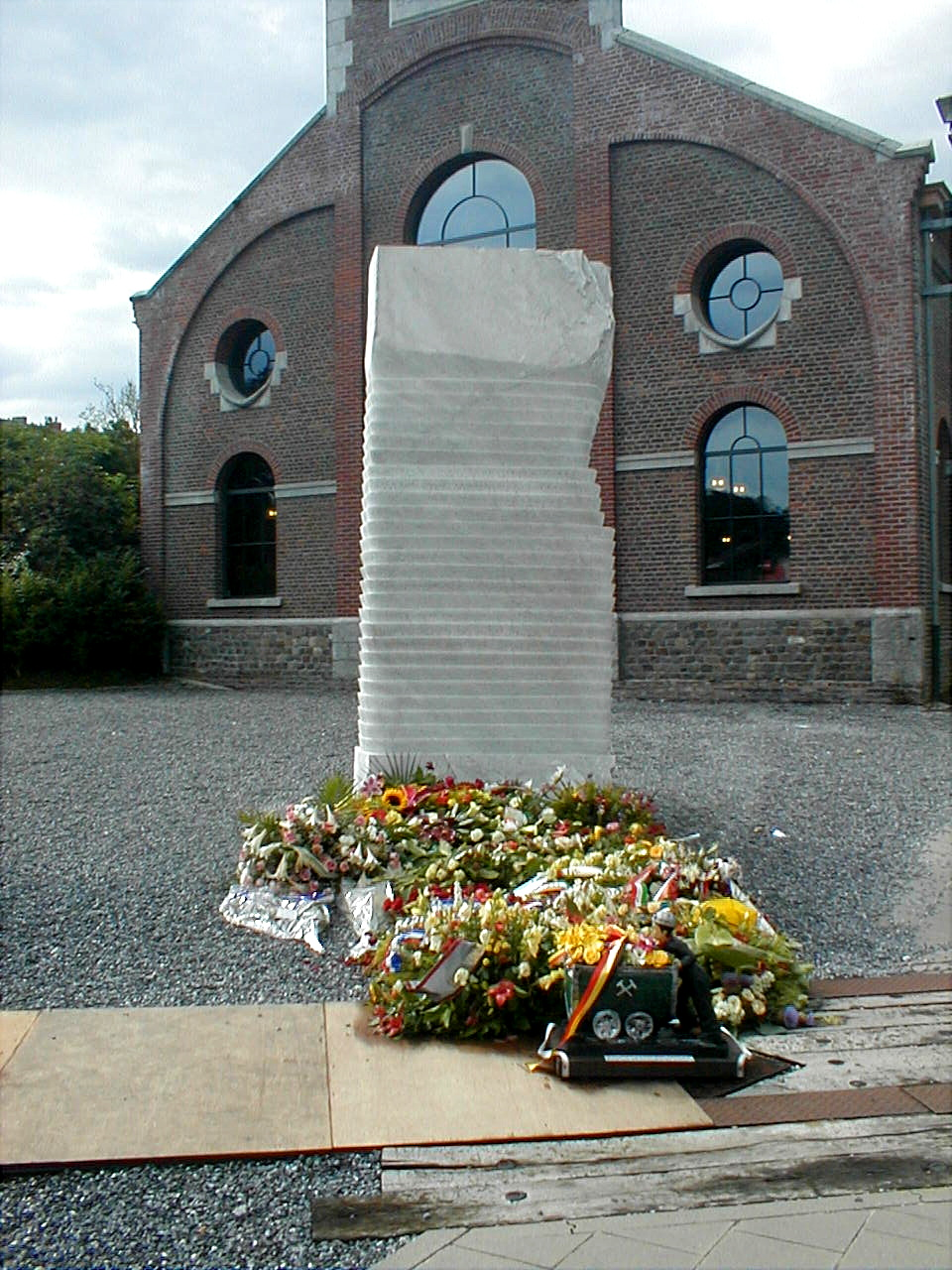
Memorial in Marcinelle, Belgium

=== Books ===
- Stroobant, Dominique (1982). Camera Oscura. Hendel Teicher. ASIN B00BBQ848C.
- Dominique Stroobant. MER. Paper Kunsthalle. 2016.

=== Documentaries ===
- Behind these Stones - Dietro i sassi Film and Photography Catalogue presented at the 37th Venice Biennale, Flemish Ministry of the Arts, Belgium, (1976)
- Non son l’uno per cento, anarchici a Carrara (I am not the one percent, anarchists in Carrara), Antonio Morabito (2006)

== Exhibitions ==
- Behind those stones, Biennale of Venice, 1976.
- L'art et le temps. Regards sur la quatrième dimension, Institut d'art contemporain de Villeurbanne, December 1985-January 1986
- The international Pinhole Photography exhibition, Contemporary Arts Museum Houston, June 30 – September 9, 1990
- Senza Obiettivo, International Exhibition of Pinhole Photography, Santa Maria della Scala (Siena) Museum, October 31 - November 17, 2002, Siena - XI Visionaria Festival
- Artempo at Fortuny Museum a show by curator and interior designer Axel Vervoordt's that investigates time in art.

== Personal life ==
He met in 1969 South-African Mona Johnson (from Cape Town) and had two children, Ish-maël (*1972) and Mascha (*1978).
