= Bernard Rancillac =

French artist (1931-2021)

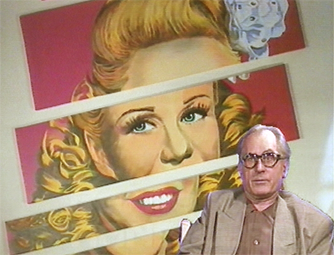
- Rancillac in 1995
- Born: 29 August 1931; Paris, France
- Died: 29 December 2021 (aged 90); Paris, France
- Known for: Painting
- Movement: Narrative Figuration

Bernard Rancillac was a French painter and sculptor. He was one of the pioneers of Narrative Figuration.

== Early life and career ==
Rancillac was born on 29 August 1931 in Paris. He spent his childhood in Algeria and returned to France with his family in 1937. In 1949, under family pressure, he tried to become teacher of drawing at the workshop of Met de Penninghen, where he met Bernard Aubertin. During his military service in Morocco, he first exhibited his drawings in a library of Meknes. In 1961, he received the prize for painting at the Biennial of Paris. In 1962, he became a pioneer of French Narrative Figuration.

== Solo exhibitions (Selection) ==
- 2017: Rancillac, les années pop, Museum of the Holy Cross Abbey, Les Sables-d'Olonne, Fr
- 2017: Rancillac, Rétrospective, Headquarters of the French Communist Party, Paris, Fr
- 2014: Encore lui, vie et mort de Mickey, Galerie Lelia Mordoch, Paris, Fr
- 2003: Rétrospective, Musée d'art moderne (Saint-Étienne), Fr
- 2001: Morceaux choisis, Galerie Sonia Zannettacci, Geneva, Switzerland
- 1998: Jazz, Fort Napoléon, La Seyne-sur-Mer, Fr
- 1997: Jazz, galerie Hervé Lourdel, Paris, Fr
- 1995: Cinécollages, Galerie Convergence, Paris, Fr
- 1994: Orient-Occident, Meymac Abbey, Meymac, Fr
- 1992: Sud-Sud, Galerie Vincent, Réunion, Fr
- 1991: 1931-61-91, Galerie Thierry Salvador, Paris, Fr
- 1989: Cinémonde, Galerie 1900-2000, Paris, Fr
- 1988: 25 ans d'images provocantes, Galerie Michel Vidal, Paris, Fr
- 1987: RANCILLAC., Galerie Convergence, Paris, Fr
- 1985: 20 ans de peinture, French Institute of Greece, Athens, Greece
- 1980: À la mémoire de…, Musée d'Art Moderne de Paris, Paris, Fr
- 1974: Jazz, Galerie Mathias Fels, Paris, Fr
- 1969: Pornographie, Galerie Daniel Templon, Paris, Fr
