= Bernard Aubertin =

French painter (1934–2015)

- Born: 29 July 1934; Fontenay-aux-Roses, France
- Died: 31 August 2015 (aged 81); Reutlingen, Germany
- Known for: Painting
- Movement: Zero

Bernard Aubertin (French pronunciation: [bɛʁnaʁ obɛʁtɛ̃]) was a French artist born in 1934 in Fontenay-aux-Roses, France. He died in August 2015 in Reutlingen, Germany.

== Biography ==
He met Yves Klein in 1957 and joined the Zero movement during the 1960–1961 period.

One of his texts, (″Esquisse de la situation picturale du rouge dans un concept spatial″) was published in the Zero magazine, vol 3. July 1961.

He is known for his red monochromes (1958), paint and nails on panel, fire paintings, and performance arts.

His works were shown at various major art exhibitions: Documenta 6, Kassel, Germany, 1977. 54th Venice Biennale, Italy, 2011. Palais de Tokyo, Paris, France, 2012.

== Solo exhibitions ==
2017:

- Bernard Aubertin Situazione Pittorica del Rosso, opere degli anni sessanta e settanta, ABC-ARTE Gallery, Genoa
- In Memoriam – Hommage à Bernard Aubertin (1934-2015), galerie Jean Brolly, Paris

2016:

- Bernard Aubertin, Leeahn Gallery, Seoul
- RED | The Estate of Bernard Aubertin, De Buck gallery, New York

2015:

- Bernard Aubertin et Bernard Rancillac: de rouge à rouge, galerie Jean Brolly, Paris
- Bernard Aubertin: Von ZERO bis heute, Galerie Heinz Holtmann, Cologne

2014:

- Bernard Aubertin und Zeitgenossen, galerie Maulberger, Munich
- Bon anniversaire Bernard!, galerie Jean Brolly, Paris

2013:

- Zéro Paris-Düsseldorf, Passage de Retz. Paris
- La nature des choses, MAMAC (Musée d'art moderne et d'art contemporain de Nice), Nice

2012:

- Livres brûlés, Galerie Jean Brolly, Paris
- Tout feu tout flamme, Tornabuoni Art, Paris
- Rouge, galerie Jean Brolly, Paris
- Bernard Aubertin – Works from 1958-1989, The Mayor Gallery, London

2010:

- Tableaux feu et monochromes, galerie Jean Brolly, Paris

2009:

- 75 x Aubertin, Stiftung für konkrete Kunst, Reutlingen

2006:

- Bernard Aubertin. Peintures monochromes, galerie Jean Brolly, Paris
- Bernard Aubertin. Le rouge total, Galleria CIDAC Arte, Brescia, Italy

== Collective exhibitions ==
2016:

- Cobra tot Zero, coll. Roetgering, in Museum Flehite en Mondriaanhuis in Amersfoort, Holland

2014:

- Rood Aubertin Rouge, (with Bernard Aubertin, Leo Erb, Jan Schoonhoven), Museum Belvedere Heerenveen, Holland
- ZERO Countdown to tomorrow, 1950s–60s, Guggenheim, New York

2015:

- ZERO Let us explore the stars, Stedelijk Museum, Amsterdam
- ZERO The International Art Movement of the 50s and 60s, Martin Gropius Bau, Berlin

2011:

- La Pittura brucia Galeria Bonioni, Reggio Emilia (Italy)
- Le feu et le rouge Studio F22 Modern Art Gallery, Brescia (Italy)

2010:

- Plein feux Galerie Arlette Gimray, Paris
- Tableaux feu — Monochrome Galerie Jean Brolly, Paris
- Il Fuoco et Il Rosso Galeria d'Arte Rosenberg, Milan
- Piano et violon brûlés Fondazione Berardelli, Brescia (Italy)

2007:

- ZERO. Avant-garde internationale des années 1950-1960, Musée d'art moderne, Saint-Étienne
- 2003 Seeing Red Hunter, College Art Galleries, New York City
