= Mattijs Visser =

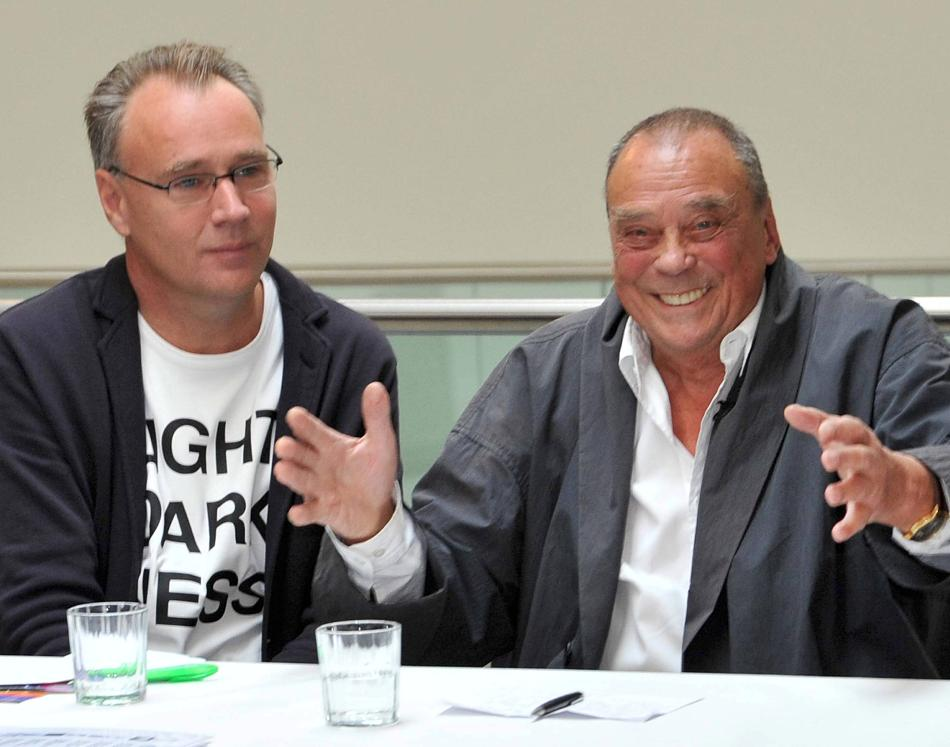
Mattijs Visser and Günther Uecker, 2010

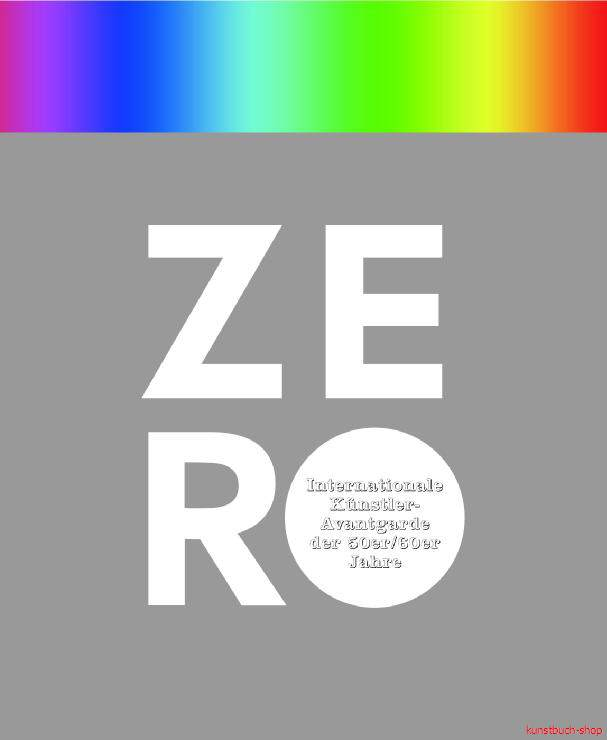
ZERO international, 2006

Mat(tijs) Visser (born 1958 in The Hague, Netherlands) studied architecture in Delft, the Netherlands and is since then an organiser of performances and art exhibitions. He was head of exhibitions at Museum Kunst Palast in Düsseldorf for eight years (2001–08), curated historical exhibitions and is best known for his Artempo exhibition at Palazzo Fortuny in Venice. He was the founding director of the international ZERO foundation in Düsseldorf from 2008 to 2017 and is a researcher at the Institute for Contemporary Archeology in Antwerp. As director from 0-projects he advises museums around the world on collection presentations.

== Exhibitions ==
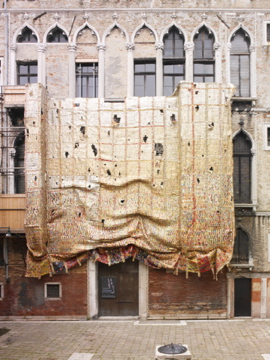
Artempo, Palazzo Fortuny, Venice

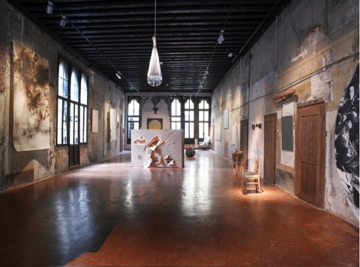
Artempo, Palazzo Fortuny, Venice

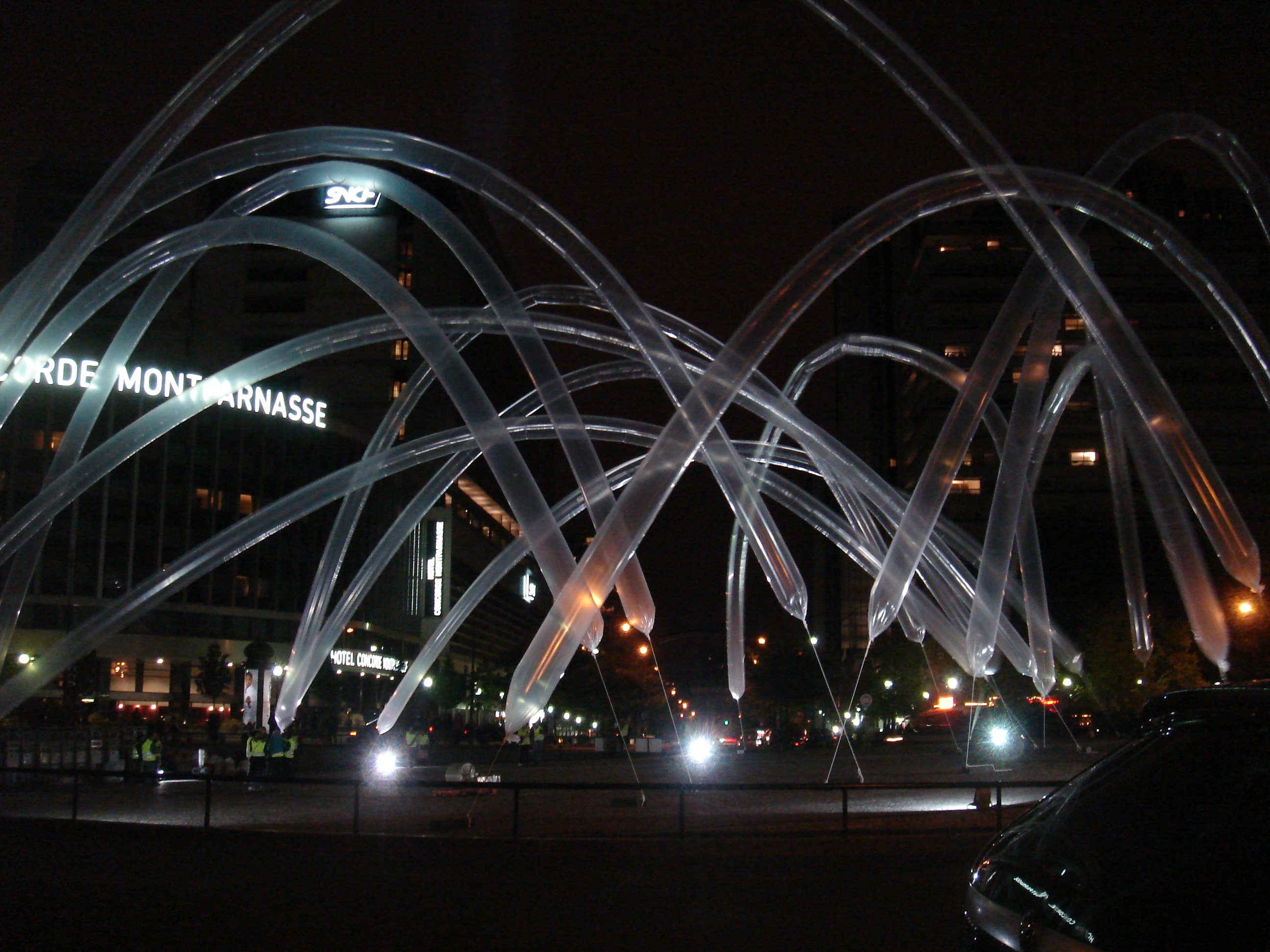
Otto Piene, Nuit Blanche, Paris

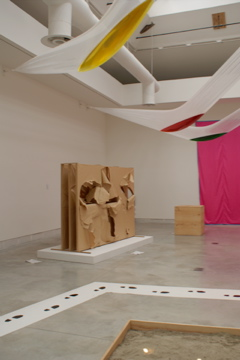
Gutai, Biennale di Venezia, Venice

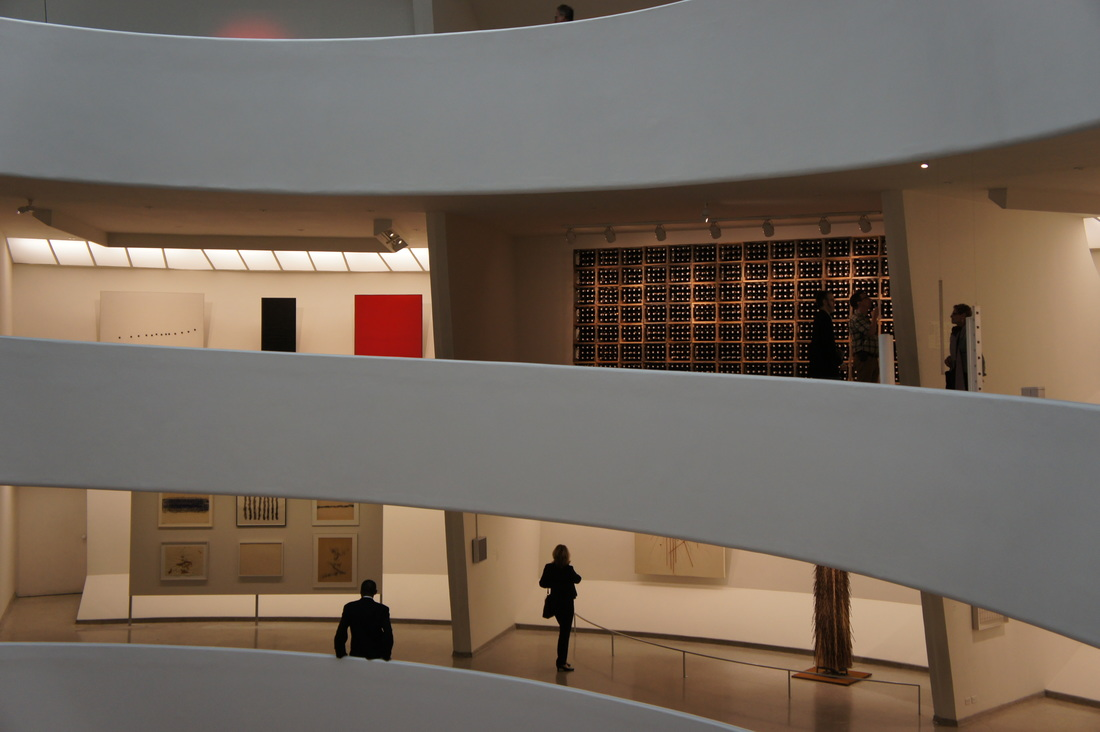
ZERO, Guggenheim, New York

Mattijs Visser has been producing exhibitions and performances since 1984, with artists as Ilya Kabakov, Robert Mapplethorpe, Helmut Newton, Jan Fabre, Robert Wilson, Kimsooja, Wim Delvoye, Laurie Anderson, El Anatsui, Anish Kapoor, Dragset and Elmgreen, Tino Sehgal, Spencer Tunick and Carsten Höller. He organised for the Museum Kunst Palast and the Royal Academy of Arts London classical exhibitions as Bonjour Russia, masterworks from the four Russian Museums (2007). For Museum Kunst Palast the Late Works by Andy Warhol (2004), Dubuffet and Art Brut, the travelling show Africa Remix (2005–07), the Caravaggio show (2006) and Diana+Actaeon, a view on nudity. He curated the exhibition Slow Art / Slow Life (2005) in which contemporary and performance art met with classical art. For the Quadriennale Düsseldorf the international ZERO (2006) show. For the City of Venice he made the concept for the prize-winning exhibition Artempo (2007) at the Venetian Palazzo Mariano Fortuny with the collection of Axel Vervoordt and the City of Venice. For the Nuit Blanche in Paris a large SKY-event with floating objects by Otto Piene. For Museum Kunst Palast he curated in 2009 an exhibition with accompanying publication for Marlene Dumas. 2009 he was co-curator for the Moscow Biennale and for the Venice Biennale he curated together with Daniel Birnbaum the large Gutai show at the Central Pavilion. His exhibition ZERO in NY at Sperone Westwater (2008) was nominated in 2009 by the Solomon R. Guggenheim Museum NY as best gallery exhibition of the year 2008. For the ZERO foundation, he curated exhibitions with Norbert Kricke, Jean Tinguely at the Tony Cragg Foundation Wuppertal, and Jef Verheyen and ZERO friends at the Langen Foundation Neuss. 2013 The Museum of Old and New Art in Tasmania invited him and Jean-Hubert Martin to organise the travelling show "Theater of the World. After receiving prices for best design and lighting, the show travelled from Hobart 2013 to Maison Rouge in Paris. For the Guggenheim New York, he conceived the large ZERO retrospective in 2015, which toured to the Gropiusbau Berlin, and the Stedelijk Museum Amsterdam. For the Multimedia Art Museum in Moscow and the Sabancı Museum in Istanbul, he curated in 2016 a show with Heinz Mack, Gunther Uecker and Otto Piene. The 7th Biennale Socle du Monde (2017) in Herning Denmark was conceived by Mattijs Visser and curated by Jean-Hubert Martin, Olivier Varenne and him selves. The MONA Museum of Old and New Art invited 2018 Visser to curate an exhibition around Vibration in the sixties, with the international artists from the ZERO movement. The United Nations appointed Visser as curator for an exhibition to memorate the First World War.

== Projects ==
With 0-projects Mattijs Visser focuses on projects with historical and contemporary art, with an international network of prominent writers, researchers, and producers. 0-projects is specialised in reconstructing ideas, installations, works, historical exhibitions, and has the "archeology's" ability to tell stories that reach beyond official or formal discourse. 0-projects works mainly for museums around the world, as the Museum of Old and New Art in Hobart, the Pushkin Museum in Moscow, and the Tehran Museum of Contemporary Art.

== Publications ==
- "Theatre of the World" exhibition catalog edited by Jean-Hubert Martin and Mattijs Visser published by the Museum of Old and New Art, with essays by Jean-Hubert Martin, David Walsh, Mattijs Visser ISBN 9780980805840
- "Henk Peeters", exhibition catalog edited by Mattijs Visser and published by the Gemeentemuseum The Hague
- "Nul = 0", exhibition catalog edited by Mattijs Visser and published by the Stedelijk Museum Schiedam / NAI uitgevers Rotterdam 2011, ISBN 978-90-5662-838-3
- “Gutai, painting with time and space”, exhibition catalog edited by Mattijs Visser and published by Museo Cantonale d'Arte Lugano, with essays by Ming Tiampo, Helen Westgeest, Atsuo Yamamoto and Mattijs Visser, Lugano 2010
- "Marlene Dumas / Magnetic Fields", exhibition catalog edited by Mattijs Visser and published by Museum Kunst Palast, Düsseldorf 2009
- “Making Worlds”, exhibition catalog 53rd International Art Exhibition, with essays by Daniel Birnbaum, Paolo Baratta and Mattijs Visser, La Biennale di Venezia 2009, ISBN 9788831796965
- "Bonjour Russland", exhibition catalogue, published by Museum Kunst Palast/Palace Editions, Düsseldorf/St.Petersburg 2007, ISBN 978-3-9809060-8-1
- “ZERO in NY“, exhibition catalog edited by Mattijs Visser, published by the ZERO foundation and Sperone Westwater, New York/Düsseldorf/Ghent 2008, ISBN 978-90-76979-73-1
- “Artempo, Where Time Becomes Art“, exhibition catalog published by Musei Civici Veneziani, with essays by Jean-Hubert Martin, Heinz Norbert Jocks, Massimo Cacciari, Giandomenico Romanelli and Mattijs Visser, MER Paper Kunsthalle Ghent 2007, ISBN 978-90-76979-47-2
- “ZERO, Internationale Künstler Avantgarde“, exhibition catalog published by Museum Kunst Palast and Cantz, with essays by Jean-Hubert Martin, Valerie Hilling, Catherine Millet and Mattijs Visser, Düsseldorf/Ostfildern 2006, ISBN 3-9809060-4-3
- "Dubuffet & Art Brut", exhibition catalog published by La Collection de l'art brut Lausanne and 5Continents, with essays by Jean-Hubert Martin, Lucienne Peiry, Michel Thèvot and Mattijs Visser, Düsseldorf/Lausanne/Milano 2005, ISBN 88-7439-226-5
- “Laurie Anderson, The Record of Time“, exhibition catalog published by Museum Kunst Palast, with essays by Thierry Raspail, Jean-Hubert Martin and Mattijs Visser, Düsseldorf 2003, ISBN 3-9808208-8-2
- "Wim Delvoye, Skatalog", exhibition catalog published by Museum Kunst Palast, edited by Mattijs Visser, Düsseldorf 2002, ISBN 3-9808208-0-7
- "Jan Fabre, The Lime Twig Man", exhibition catalog published by Galerie der Stadt Stuttgart, edited by Johann-Karl Schmidt, Ursula Zeller and Tijs Visser, Stuttgart 1995, ISBN 3-89322-751-2
- ”Robert Mapplethorpe, The Power of Theatrical Madness“ published by the Institute of Contemporary Arts, London, designed and edited by Mattijs Visser, London 1968, ISBN 0-905263-90-1

== Membership ==
- Member Advisory Board, Institute for Contemporary Art and Science, Deventer (2017-)
- Advisory Committee, 8th Socle du Monde Biennale, Herning (2017-)
- Board Member, Institute for Contemporary Archeology, Antwerp (2018-)
- Advisory Committee, Teheran Museum of Contemporary Art (2015-)
- Advisory Committee, Walter Leblanc Foundation, Brussels (2009-)
- Advisory Committee, Inamori Foundation, Kyoto (2008)
- Advisory Committee, Museum of Old and New Art, Hobart (2008)
- Member Steering Committee, Islamic Museum of Modern Art, Doha (2008)
- Member Acquisition Committee, Museum Kunst Palast / Stadt Düsseldorf (2001–2008)
- Advisory Committee, Prins Claus Award 2005
- Member Advisory Board, Fritschy-Prijs 2005
- Member Selection Committee, Biënnale Europea Arti Visive 2003, La Spezia
- Member Advisory Board, vzw Janus, Antwerpen (1998–2001)
- Member IKT (sinds 2001)
