= Mayor Gallery =

Contemporary art gallery in St James', London

Coordinates: 51.5101°N 0.1411°W

The Mayor Gallery
- Established: 1925
- Location: Bury Street, St James', London, England
- Type: Art gallery, modern art, contemporary art
- Founders: Fred Mayor; Douglas Cooper
- Website: www.mayorgallery.com

The Mayor Gallery is an art gallery located on Bury Street, London, England. Since its foundation by Fred Mayor in partnership with Douglas Cooper in 1925, it has promoted modern and contemporary art. Since the early 1970s, under James Mayor, Fred Mayor's son, the gallery has focused on contemporary American artists associated with Pop art, Conceptual art and Abstract expressionism, such as Eva Hesse, Roy Lichtenstein, Agnes Martin, Claes Oldenburg, Robert Rauschenberg, Robert Ryman, Cy Twombly and Andy Warhol. More recently, the gallery has exhibited artists associated with Minimal art, Dada and the international Zero (art) movement, including Heinz Mack and Otto Piene.

== History ==
The Mayor Gallery opened in 1925 at 37 Sackville Street. The gallery closed in 1926 and reopened in 1933 at 18 Cork Street, in an area regarded as the historic art district of London. Its early exhibitions included foreign artists such as Alexander Calder and Paul Klee. In its early years, the Mayor Gallery was also involved in the creation of Unit One, a British group formed by the painter Paul Nash in 1933 with fellow artists Henry Moore, Ben Nicholson, Barbara Hepworth, Edward Wadsworth, Edward Burra and others to promote Modern art, architecture and design.

The German Jewish refugee art dealer Alfred Flechtheim worked for the Mayor Gallery after his art gallery was Aryanized by Nazis in Germany. Flechtheim's gallery records and personal library were left with Fred Mayor but were later destroyed.
