= Armando (artist) =

Dutch artist (1929–2018)

Armando (18 September 1929 – 1 July 2018), born Herman Dirk van Dodeweerd, was a Dutch painter, sculptor and writer.

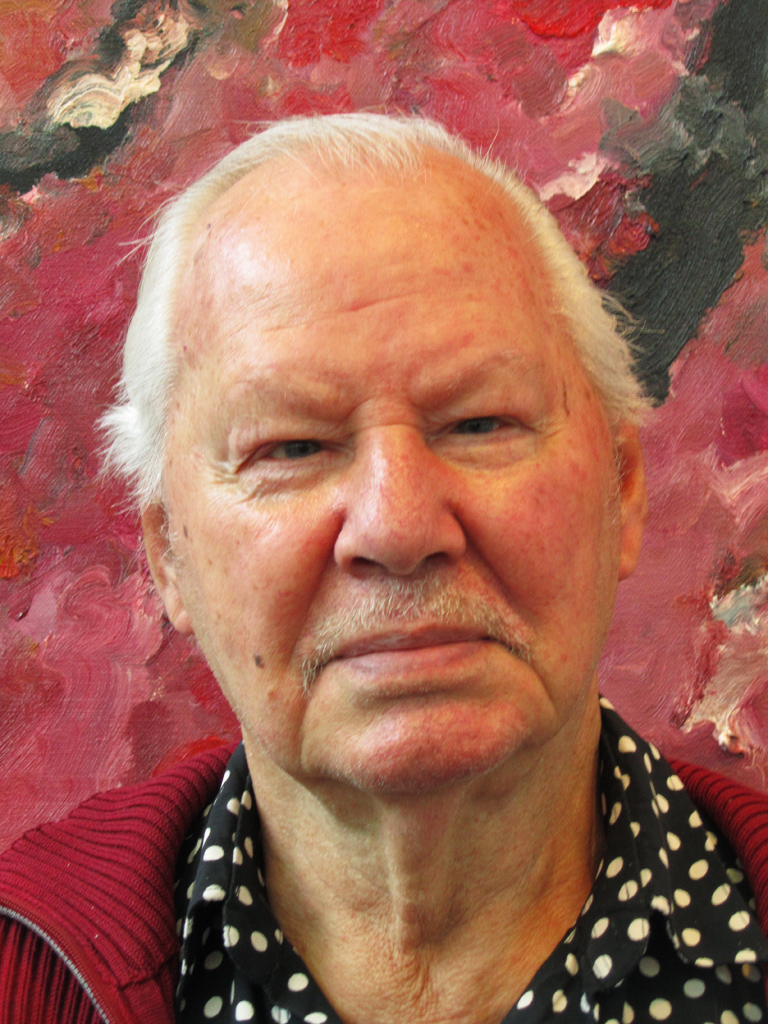
Armando in 2012

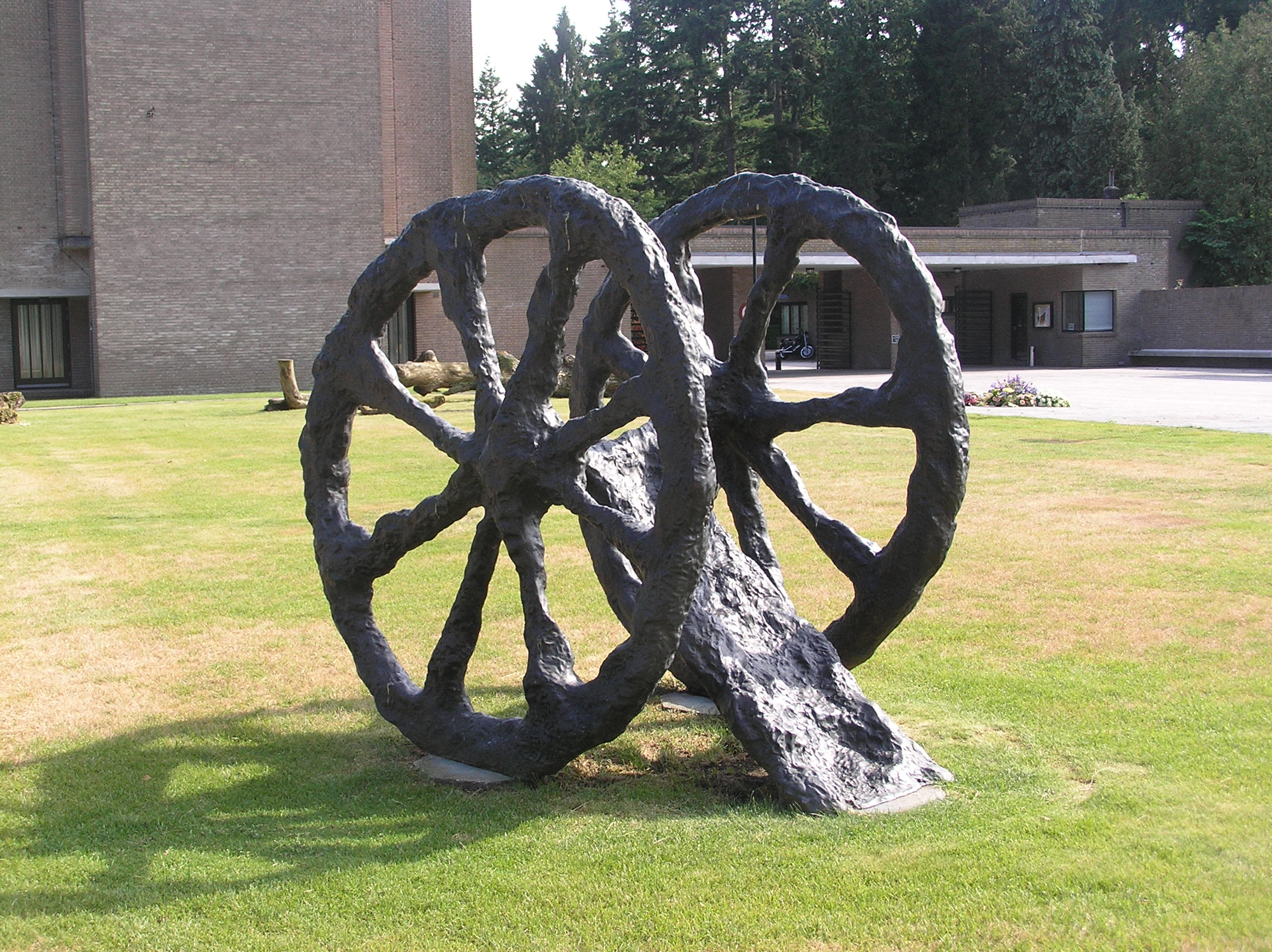
Sculpture Feldzug (1989) by Armando at the entrance of Cemetery Rusthof in Leusden, Netherlands

== Biography ==
Armando was born in Amsterdam, and as child moved to Amersfoort. There he saw, during the German occupation of the Netherlands, how the Nazis set up a "transition camp" for prisoners who were to be sent to concentration camps. The suffering of the victims and the cruelty of the Nazi camp guards, so near his home, influenced him for the rest of his life. After the liberation (1945), he studied art history at the University of Amsterdam.

His first solo exhibition was at the Galerie Le Canard, Amsterdam, in 1954. At this time he also started to write poetry. He was influenced by the CoBrA art group, and made abstract drawings—with his left hand, in the dark. He was also influenced by Jean Dubuffet and Jean Fautrier, producing thickly impastoed paintings.

In 1958 he was one of the founding members of the Nederlandse Informele Groep (Informelen), with the painters Kees van Bohemen, Jan Henderikse, Henk Peeters, Jan Schoonhoven and others.

By 1959 he had joined the Situationist International (SI) and attended their Third conference, held in Munich 17–20 April 1959. With Anton Alberts, Constant and Har Oudejans he wrote First proclamation of the Dutch Section of the SI. However, he was expelled from the SI in the Spring of 1960, though continuing to contribute to other Situationist publications like the Situationist Times. He also contributed to Podium, Gard Sivik, De Nieuwe Stijl, and Barbarber.

He lived partly in Amsterdam, partly in Amersfoort, and until 1989 also in Berlin.

== Fire at the Armando museum, 2007 ==
Amersfoort, the place of his childhood, hosted a museum devoted to his work. On 22 October 2007 a large fire struck the museum and burned thirteen Armando paintings. At the time of the fire there was also an exhibition with works of painters like Ruisdael, Dürer, Seghers and Kiefer, which were all lost, with damages estimated at about three million euros (US$4,000,000). (Source: Dutch TV News NOS, 24 October 2007) A final balance of the damage by the fire was made on Tuesday 20 November 2007. According to a Dutch newsarticle, 63 paintings were lost, 8 were recovered. 6 of the recovered paintings are badly damaged, two are lightly damaged.

== The new Armando museum: Museum Oud Amelisweerd (MOA) ==
Since 2014 the Armando Collection has been housed in a new home, the Museum Oud Amelisweert near Bunnik (NLD). The MOA regularly organizes exhibitions with works by Armando, sometimes in relation with works by other artists. Unfortunately the museum was closed in 2018, due to insufficient funding.

== Honours and awards ==
=== Honours ===
- 1990 - Knight of the Order of Oranje-Nassau
- 2006 - Knight of the Order of the Netherlands Lion
- 2009 - The Honorary medal for Arts and Science of the Order of the House of Orange

=== Awards ===
- 1987 - The Gouden Ganzenveer voor his contribution to the Dutch culture and the distribution throughout Europa.
