= Museum Kunstpalast =

Art museum in Düsseldorf

Kunstpalast

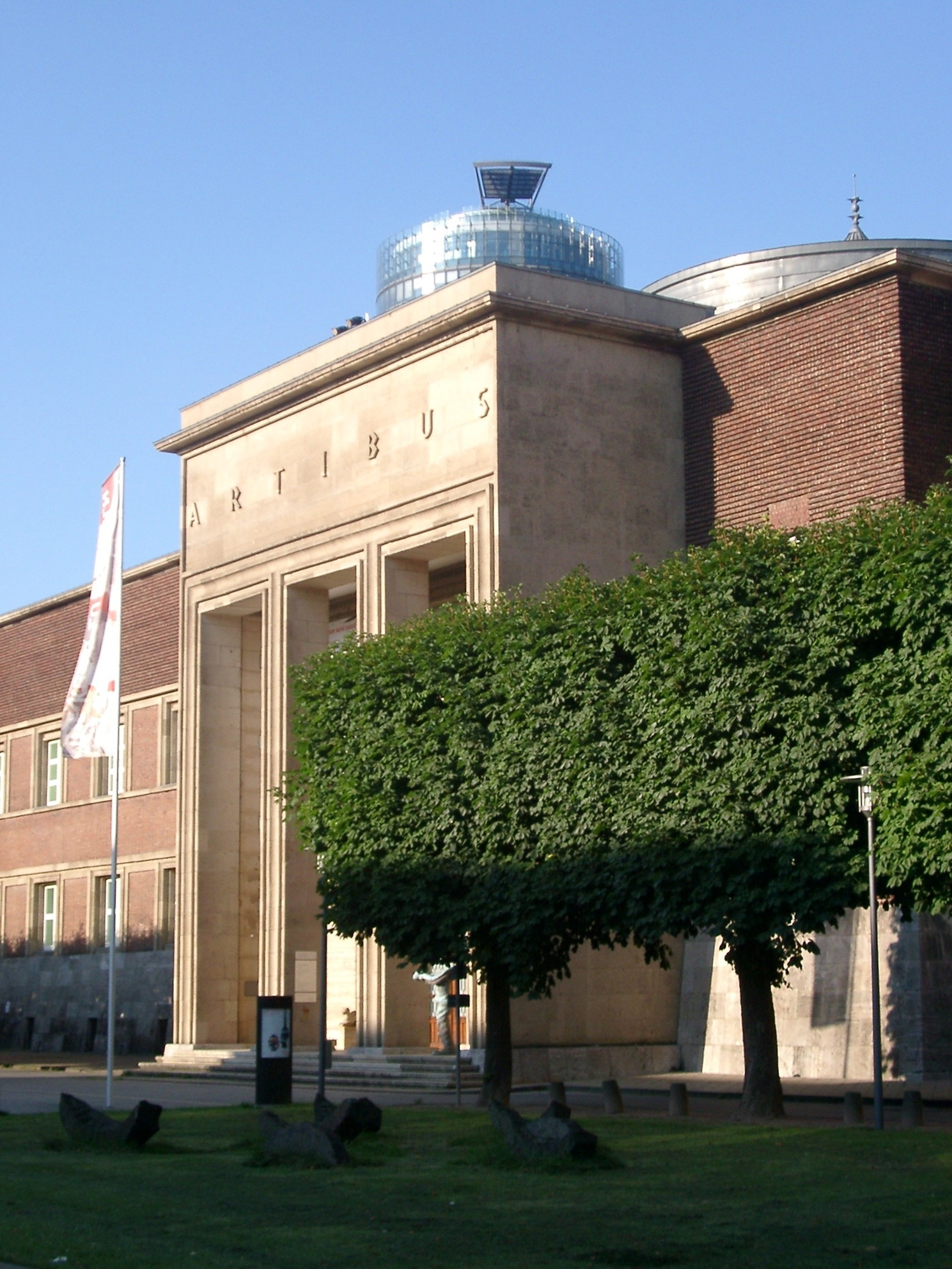
- Kunstpalast
- Interactive fullscreen map
- Location: Düsseldorf, Germany
- Coordinates: 51°14′03″N 6°46′24″E
- Type: Contemporary art
- Director: Felix Krämer
- Public transit access: Düsseldorf Stadtbahn: U70 U74 U75 U76 U77 at Tonhalle/Ehrenhof
- Website: kunstpalast.de/en

The Kunstpalast, formerly Kunstmuseum Düsseldorf is an art museum in Düsseldorf.

== History ==
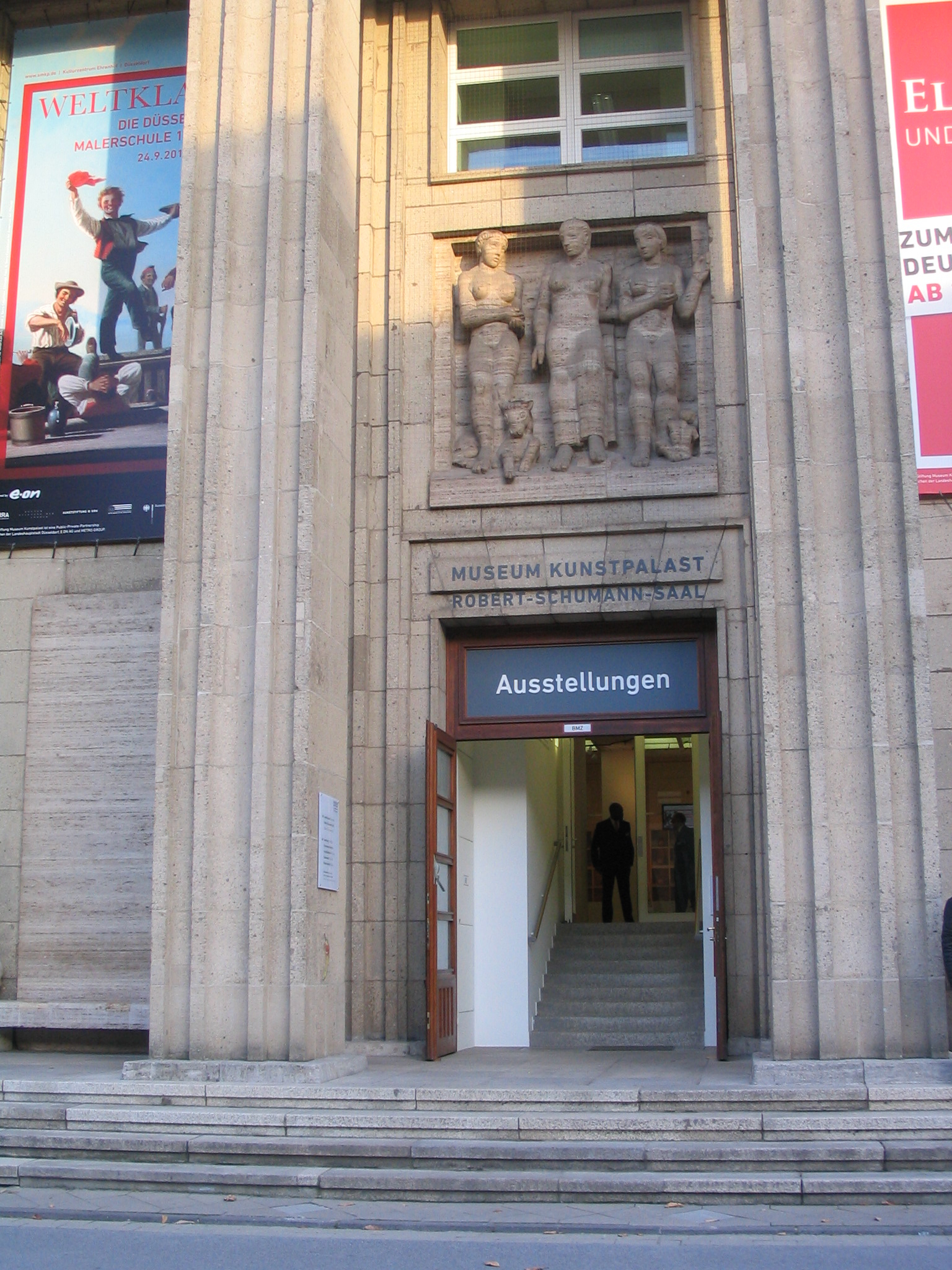
Entrance Eastern wing

The roots of the museum go back around 300 years. In 1932, the collection of the Kunstakademie Düsseldorf (Academy of Art) was housed in the Kunstmuseum Düsseldorf. This included the exhibits given by the popular regent Jan Wellem, Duke of Palatinate, and his wife Anna Maria Luisa de' Medici, and some rich citizens of Düsseldorf. The academy had been founded in 1710, its collection expanded in the 19th century by the collection of Lambert Krahe.

The Düsseldorfer Gallerieverein, founded in the 19th century, collected many drawings of the Düsseldorfer Malerschule, later given to that collection. The Museum for Advanced Arts, whose opening was in 1883, merged with that museum later.

The Kunstmuseum in its actual form opened in 1913. Subsequently, the Museumsverein (the Museum Association) and the Künstler-Verein zur Veranstaltung von Kunstausstellungen (the Artists’ Association for the Realisation of Art Exhibitions) collaborated in the organisation of art exhibitions, and the foundation Stiftung Museum Kunstpalast was established in 1998.

In January 2020, the NRW Forum became part of the Kunstpalast.

== Architecture ==
In 1902, the first Kunstpalast was erected at Ehrenhof ("court of honour"), for a major exhibition featuring artworks as well as industrial and trade items. A new building in Art Deco style was designed by Wilhelm Kreis in 1926, for an exhibition on health care, social care and exercise, called "GeSoLei". The Communal Arts Collection and the Hetjens-Museum for ceramics (applied arts moved into the Ehrenhof building in 1928.

In 1969 the ceramics moved to the Palais Nesselrode at the Schulstraße in Düsseldorf-Carlstadt. There is also the NRW-Forum Kultur und Wirtschaft (forum for culture and economy of North Rhine-Westphalia) in the same building complex.

The museum was extensively remodelled by Oswald Mathias Ungers and reopened in 2001.

== Collection ==
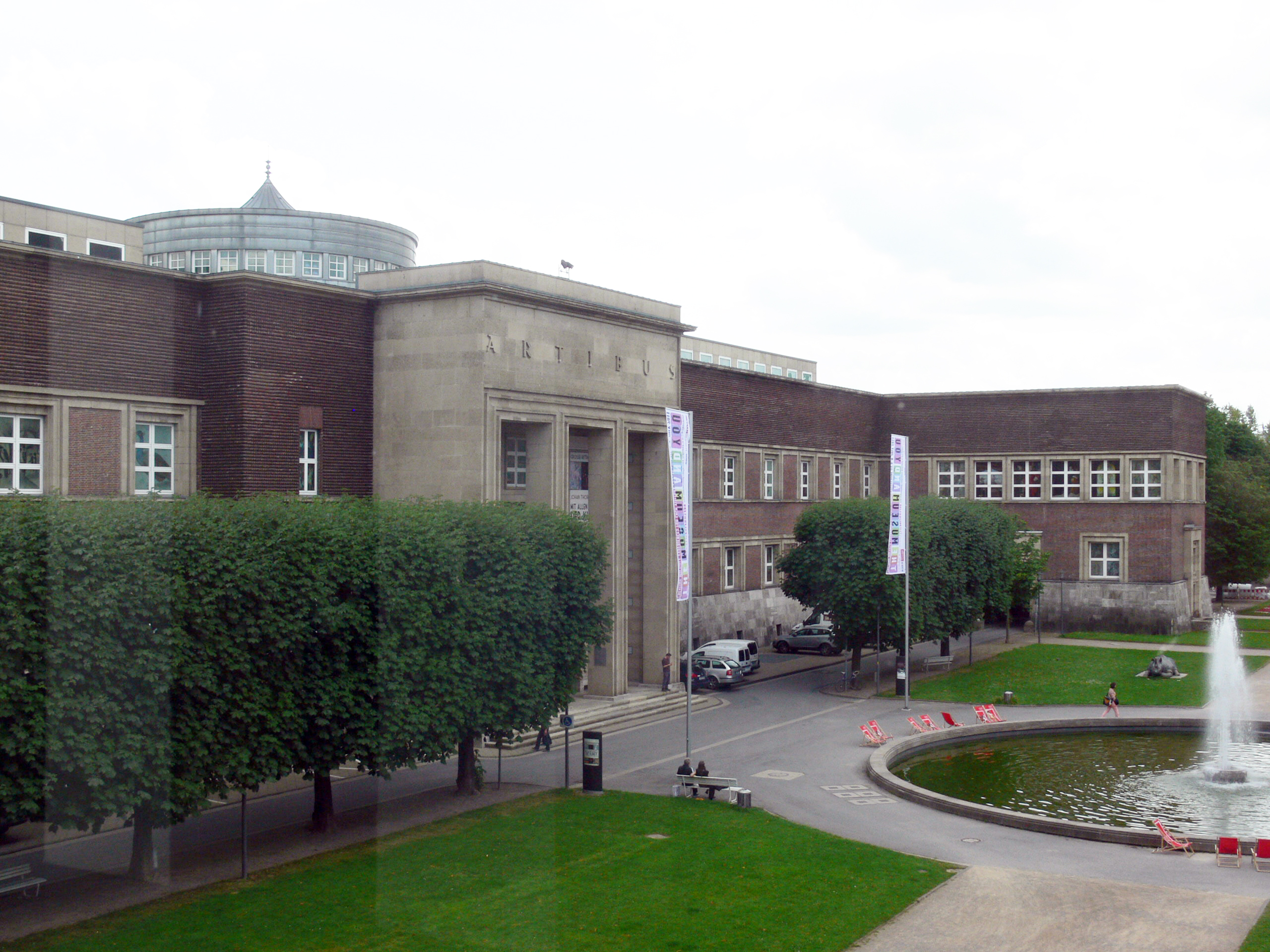
Museum Kunst Palast

The Museum Kunstpalast includes objects of fine arts from Classical antiquity to the present, including drawings, sculptures, a collection of more than 70,000 graphic exhibits and photographs, applied arts and design and one of Europe's largest glass collections, the Helmut Hentrich Glass Museum.

The graphic collection includes 14,000 Italian baroque graphics. The collection presents several works from Europe, Japan, Persia/Iran, beginning with the 3rd century BC. The art collection also include works from periods such as Gothic, Renaissance, Baroque, the time of Goethe, the 19th century, the 20th century including a large collection of ZERO works, and the present.

== Restitution of Franz Marc's The Foxes ==
In 2017, the family of the German Jewish art collector Kurt Grawi requested the restitution of Franz Marc's painting The Foxes (1913) ("Die Füchse") which had been acquired by Grawi in 1928. When the Nazis rose to power in 1933, they persecuted Grawi because he was Jewish, "Aryanizing" his business in 1935 and imprisoning him in the Sachsenhausen concentration camp in 1938. Grawi fled Germany for Chile in 1939, selling the painting to fund his escape. In 2021, the German Advisory Commission recommended that the city of Düsseldorf restitute the painting to Grawi's heirs and the Düsseldorf City Council voted to restitute the painting.

In January 2022 Düsseldorf restituted Marc's The Foxes ("Die Füchse" ) to the Grawi heirs.

== Gallery ==
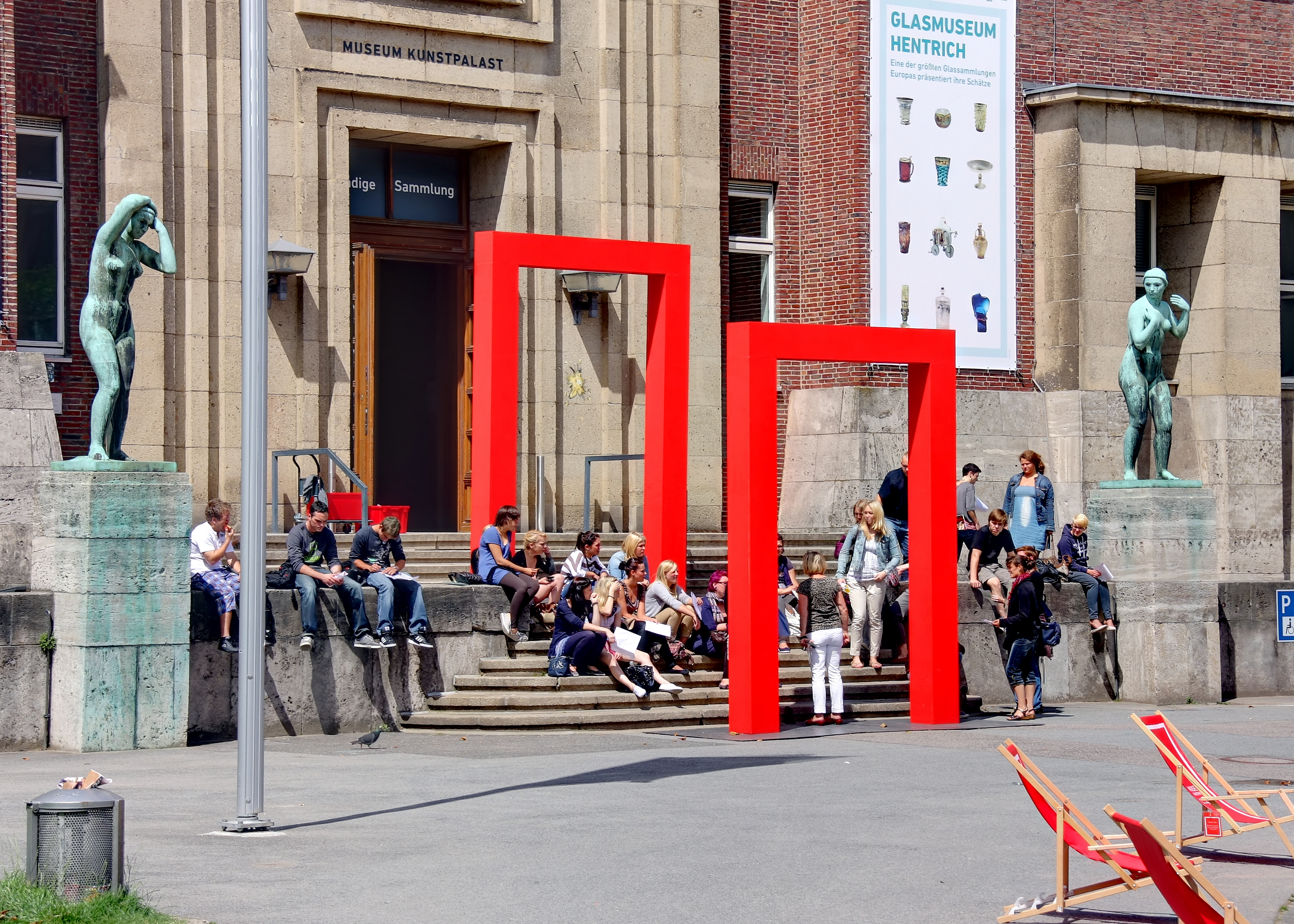
Entrance Western wing

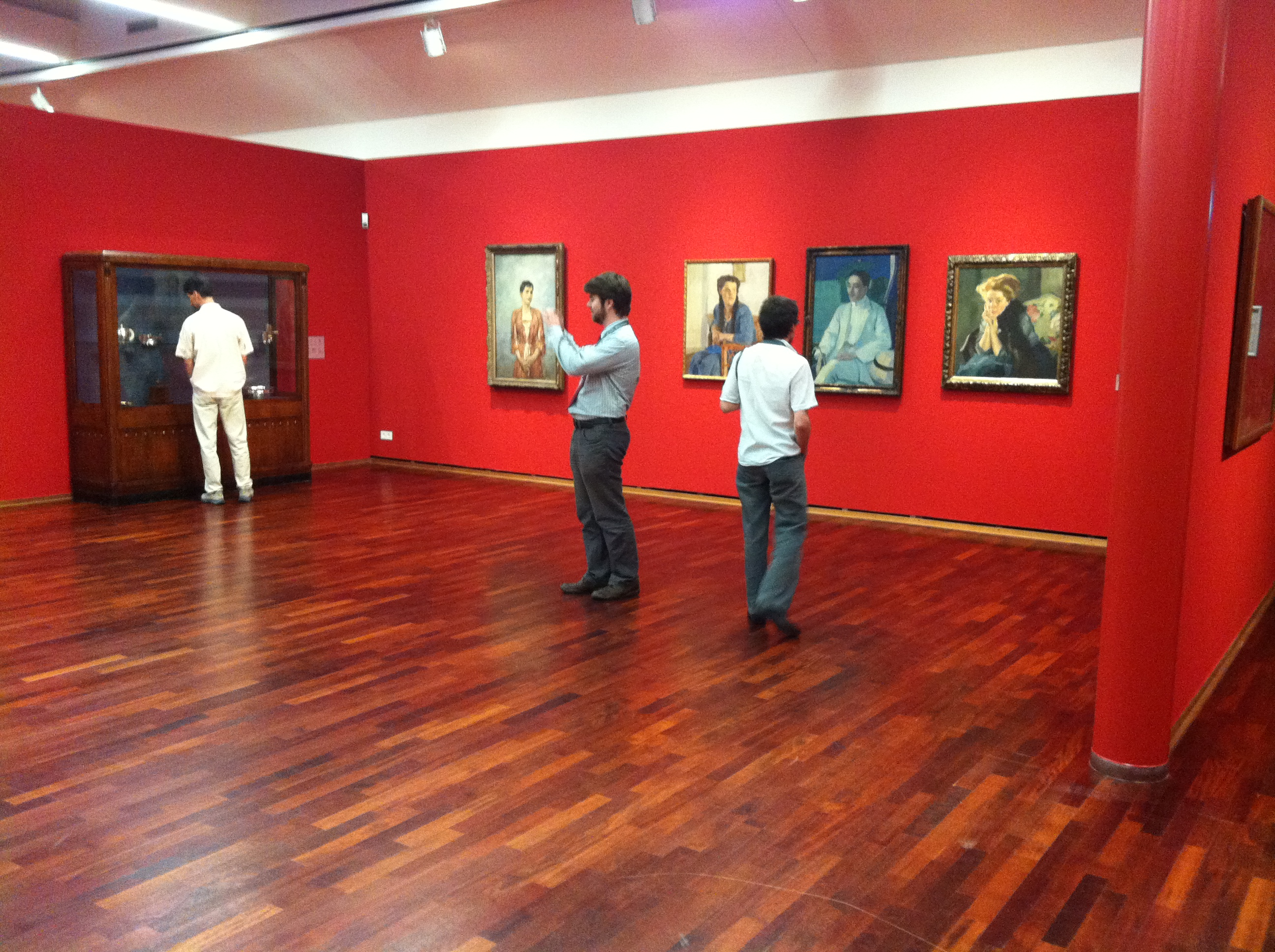

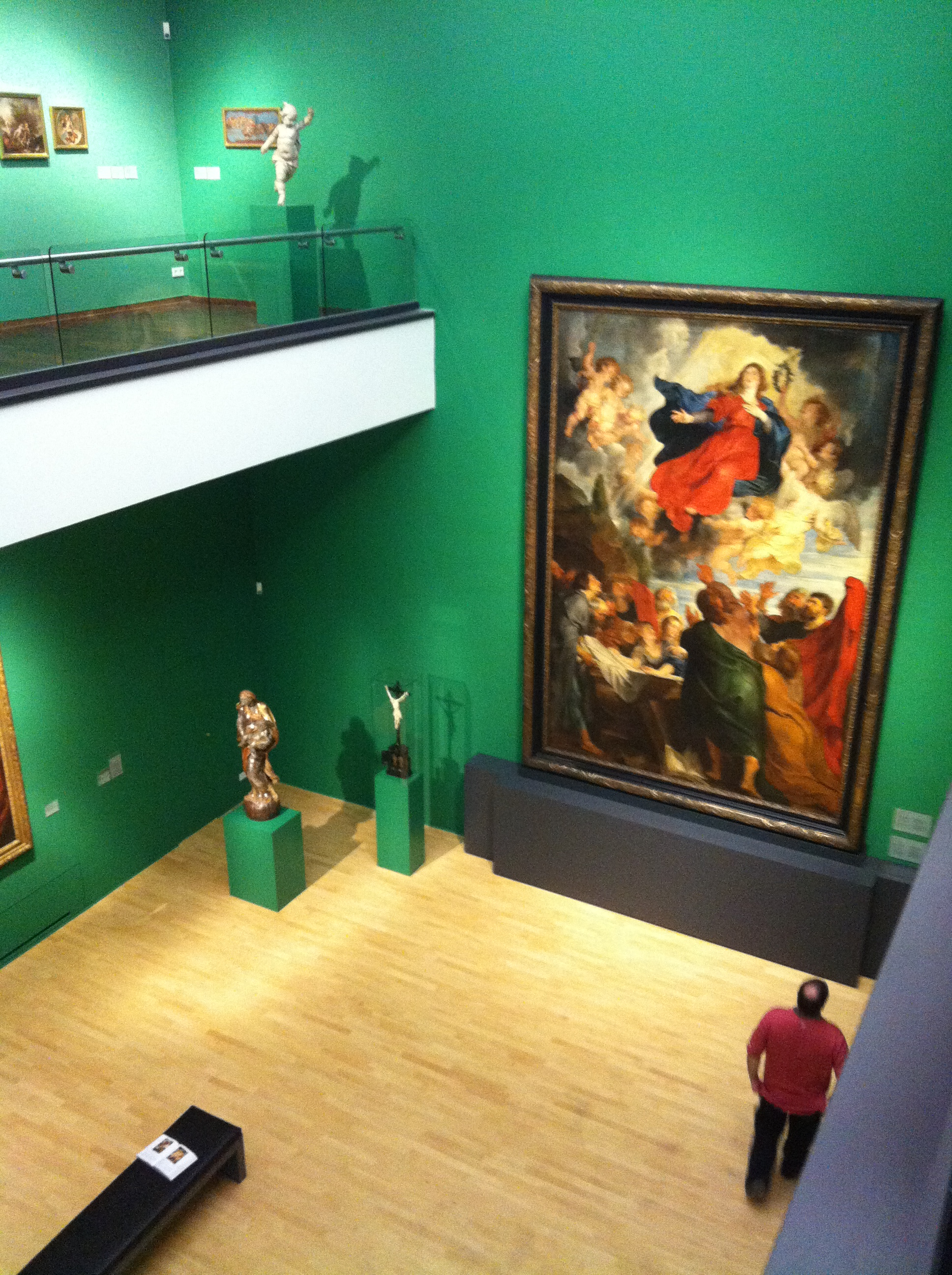
The Assumption of the Virgin Mary by Peter Paul Rubens

== Affiliated Institutes ==
- The Archive for artistical photography of the rhenanian artscene (AFORK) is part of the Modern Department and has an extension collection of prints and will be part of a future Research Center for the Arts at the museum.
- The ZERO foundation, founded by the Museum Kunst Palast together with the three ZERO artists Heinz Mack, Günther Uecker und Otto Piene, has temporary offices, with an extensive archive, in the New Harbour, and will be part of a future Research Center for the Arts at the museum.

== Exhibitions ==
Among several exhibitions of archival material, the Museum Kunstpalast has already hosted some exhibitions on Old Masters as well, including:

- An exhibition of paintings by Caravaggio (from 2006 to 2007)
- The biggest exhibition of El Greco paintings in Germany since several decades. The exhibition showed their influence on Modern Art. It took place in 2012
- An exhibition of paintings by Spanish baroque painter Francisco de Zurbarán (from 2015 to 2016)

== See also ==
- List of largest art museums
