= Günther Uecker =

German artist (1930–2025)

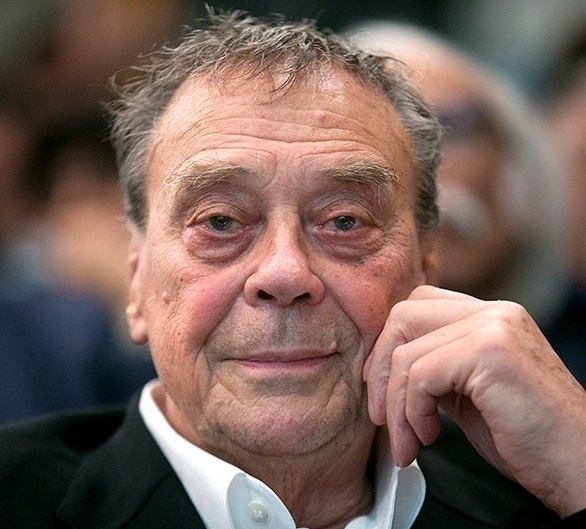
- Uecker in 2016
- Born: 13 March 1930; Wendorf, Mecklenburg-Schwerin, Germany
- Died: 10 June 2025 (aged 95); Düsseldorf, North Rhine-Westphalia, Germany
- Education: Kunstakademie Düsseldorf
- Organizations: ZERO
- Known for: Painting; sculpture; installation art

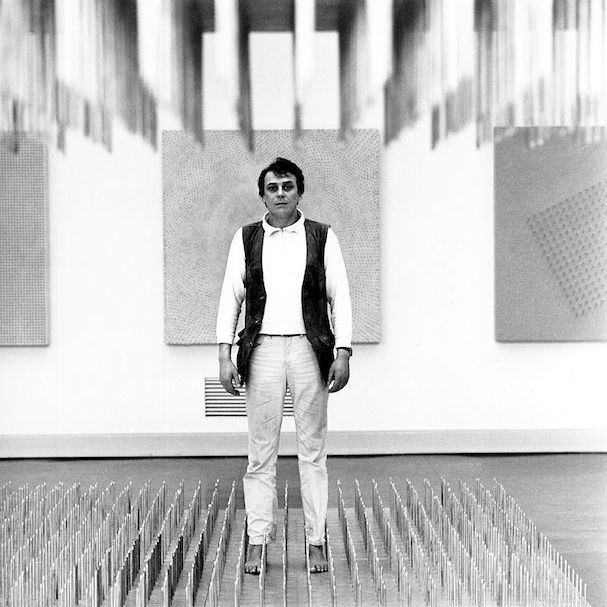
Günther Uecker, portrait by Lothar Wolleh

Günther Uecker (German pronunciation: [ˈɡʏntɐ ˈʔʏkɐ]; 13 March 1930 – 10 June 2025) was a German painter, sculptor, op artist and installation artist. He became known primarily for his nail reliefs. In 1961, Uecker joined the ZERO group.

== Early life and education ==
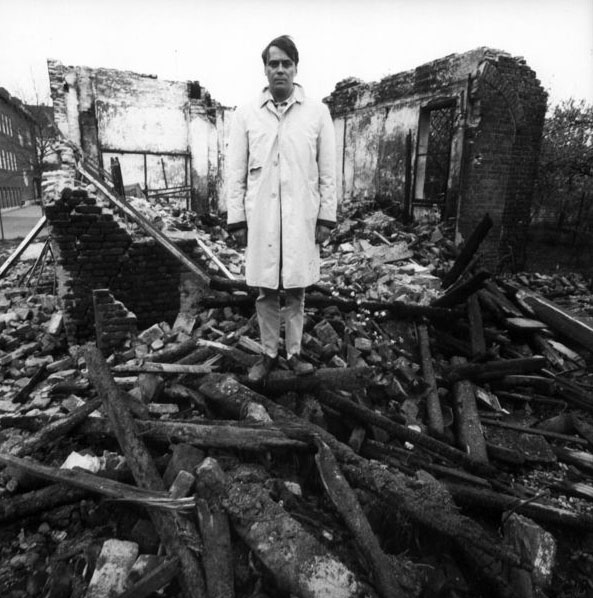
Günther Uecker, portrait by Lothar Wolleh

Uecker was born on 13 March 1930 in Wendorf, Mecklenburg. He grew up on a farm. At the end of World War II, he had to nail doors and windows to protect his mother and sister. Russian soldiers forced him, then age 15, to recover bodies that had been washed to the shore of the Baltic Sea.

Uecker began his artistic education in 1949 when he took up studies at Wismar in 1952. He then went to the art school in Berlin-Weißensee, where he was educated in social realism, including work on a statue of Lenin 20 meters high. He was dismissed from the institution. After the East German uprising of 1953, he escaped to the West. He settled in Düsseldorf where he studied under Otto Pankok at the Kunstakademie Düsseldorf. In 1956, he began integrating nails in his art.

== Career ==
Uecker occupied himself with the medium of light, studied optical phenomena, series of structures, and the realms of oscillation that actively integrate the viewer and enable him to influence the visual process by kinetic or manual interference.

In 1960, he met with group ZERO members Heinz Mack and Otto Piene, who propagated a new beginning of art in opposition to the German Informel. Uecker, Mack and Piene began working together in joint studios at the Stedelijk Museum in Amsterdam in 1962 and installed a 'Salon de Lumière' at the Palais des Beaux-Arts in Paris. Other 'light salons' followed in Krefeld and in Frankfurt.

Beginning in 1966, after the group ZERO dissolved its last joint exhibition, Uecker increasingly began using nails as an artistic means of expression —- a material that, until today, stands in the centre of his oeuvre. He began hammering nails into pieces of furniture, musical instruments as well as household objects, combining nails with the theme of light and creating his series of light nails and kinetic nails and other works. a-x Zero Garden (1966), in the collection of the Honolulu Museum of Art, demonstrates his use of nails to create the illusion of movement.

Light and electricity continued to be main subjects and natural materials, such as sand and water, were included in his installations, resulting in an interaction of the different elements to create a sensation of light, space, movement, and time. Uecker's oeuvre included painting, object art, installations as well as stage designs and films. His origins explained his interest in the eastern European avant-garde of the 1920s and 1930s, but he was likewise interested in Asian cultures and their ideas.

In 1974, Uecker began teaching at the Kunstakademie Düsseldorf and was promoted to professor in 1976. He became professor at the Academy, alongside Joseph Beuys and Klaus Rinke. He taught there until 1995. Halina Jaworski was his first master student (Meisterschülerin).

Uecker's artistic creativity reached a climax in 2000 in the prayer room he designed for the rebuilt Reichstag building in Berlin.

With Otto Piene, Heinz Mack, and Mattijs Visser, he founded in 2008 the international ZERO foundation. The foundation has the complete ZERO archives from three Düsseldorfer artists as well as documents and photos from other related artists.

Uecker was active through his last years; Glenn Adamson of Frieze reported that, even when Uecker was 90 years old, he was still working seven days a week, six hours a day, in the Düsseldorf studio he had held since 1987. The blue stained glass windows in Schwerin Cathedral were among one of his last works. In December 2024, the windows were inaugurated.

== Death ==
Uecker died at the University Hospital of Düsseldorf on 10 June 2025, at the age of 95.

== Exhibitions ==
In addition to numerous Gruppo Zero exhibitions, Uecker participated in many other exhibitions, including documenta 4 in Kassel, Germany (1968), the 35th Venice Biennale (1970), and numerous solo shows, including one at the Kunsthalle Düsseldorf (1983), a retrospective at the Kunsthalle der Hypo-Kulturstiftung, Munich (1990), and another solo show at the Ulmer Museum, Ulm, Germany (2010). He had his first solo exhibition in the United States at the Howard Wise Gallery on West 57th Street, showing important work such as the kinetic New York Dancer I (1966). He designed the scenery for Richard Wagner's Lohengrin at Bayreuth (1979–82).

His first solo show since 1968 took place in early 2021 at the Lévy Gorvy gallery in Paris, called Lichtbogen, where he presented a new set of art inspired by a visit to an island in the Strait of Hormuz.

Uecker's work can be found in the collections of major institutions worldwide, among them: the ZERO foundation and Museum Kunst Palast, Düsseldorf; Calderara Foundation Collection, Milan; Courtauld Institute of Art, (London); Honolulu Museum of Art, the Schleswig-Holstein Museums (Germany), Studio Esseci (Padua, Italy), Stedelijk Museum, Amsterdam, Van Abbemuseum (Eindhoven, Netherlands), Von der Heydt-Museum (Wuppertal, Germany); Museum of Modern Art, New York; Art Institute of Chicago, Chicago; Museum of Contemporary Art, Los Angeles; Centre Pompidou, Paris; Peggy Guggenheim Collection, Venice the Ulster Museum, Belfast; and the Walker Art Center, Minnesota.

== Art market ==
At Art Basel in 2014, art dealer Dominique Lévy sold a Uecker's suite of eight white paintings for more than 5 million euros. In a Christie's Post-War Auction, Uecker's Spirale 1/ Spirale 2, sold for an artist record of £2,629,000 ($3.2 million dollars), on 7 March 2017.

== Awards ==
- 1983 Goslarer Kaiserring
- 2000 Pour le Mérite
- 2001 Knight Commander's Cross of the Order of Merit of the Federal Republic of Germany

== Film ==
- 0 x 0 = Kunst: Maler ohne Farbe und Pinsel, Hessischer Rundfunk (HR), West Germany 1962
- Wie ein Bauer auf dem Feld – Günther Uecker, West Germany 1989 documentary film
- Günther Uecker – Poesie der Destruktion, Germany 2004 TV documentary film
- Günther Uecker – Huldigung an Hafez
- Never Look Away—Uecker is depicted sympathetically during his early Kunstakademie Düsseldorf years in this 2018 German film based loosely on the life of artist Gerhard Richter.
