= Zero (art) =

European artist group

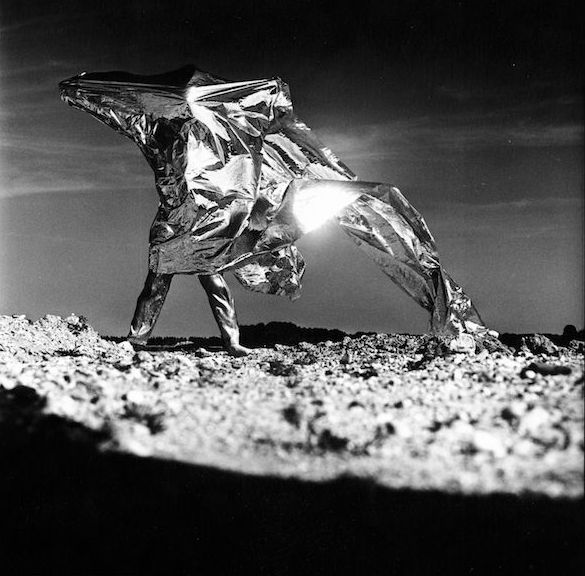
Heinz Mack, photo by Lothar Wolleh

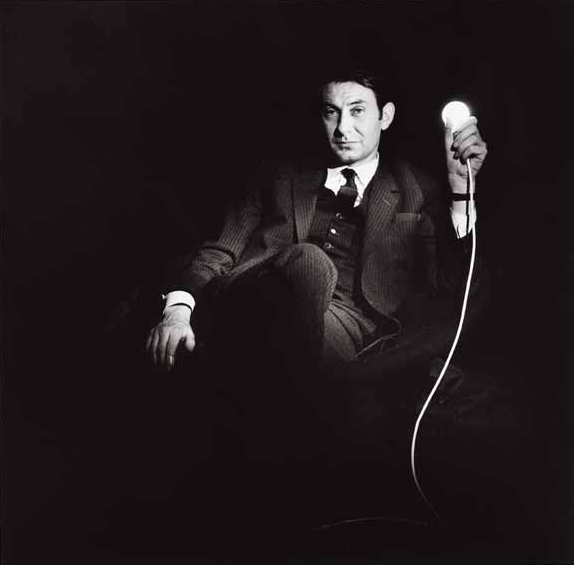
Otto Piene, photo by Lothar Wolleh

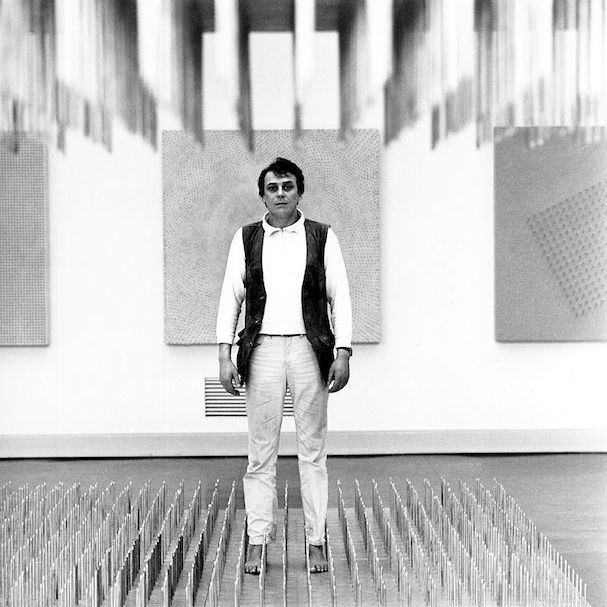
Günther Uecker, photo by Lothar Wolleh

Zero (usually styled as ZERO) was an artist group founded in the late 1950s in Düsseldorf by Heinz Mack and Otto Piene. Piene described it as "a zone of silence and of pure possibilities for a new beginning". In 1961 Günther Uecker joined the initial founders. ZERO became an international movement, with artists from Germany, the Netherlands, Belgium, France, Switzerland, and Italy.

== History ==
Mack, Piene, and Günther Uecker began the ZERO movement. Participants hailed from France (Arman, Yves Klein, and Bernard Aubertin), Italy (Lucio Fontana, Piero Manzoni), Belgium (Pol Bury), and Switzerland (Christian Megert, Jean Tinguely).

Many of the ZERO artists are better known for their affiliations with other movements, including Nouveau Réalisme, Arte Povera, Minimalism, Op Art, Land Art, and Kinetic Art.

== Exhibitions ==
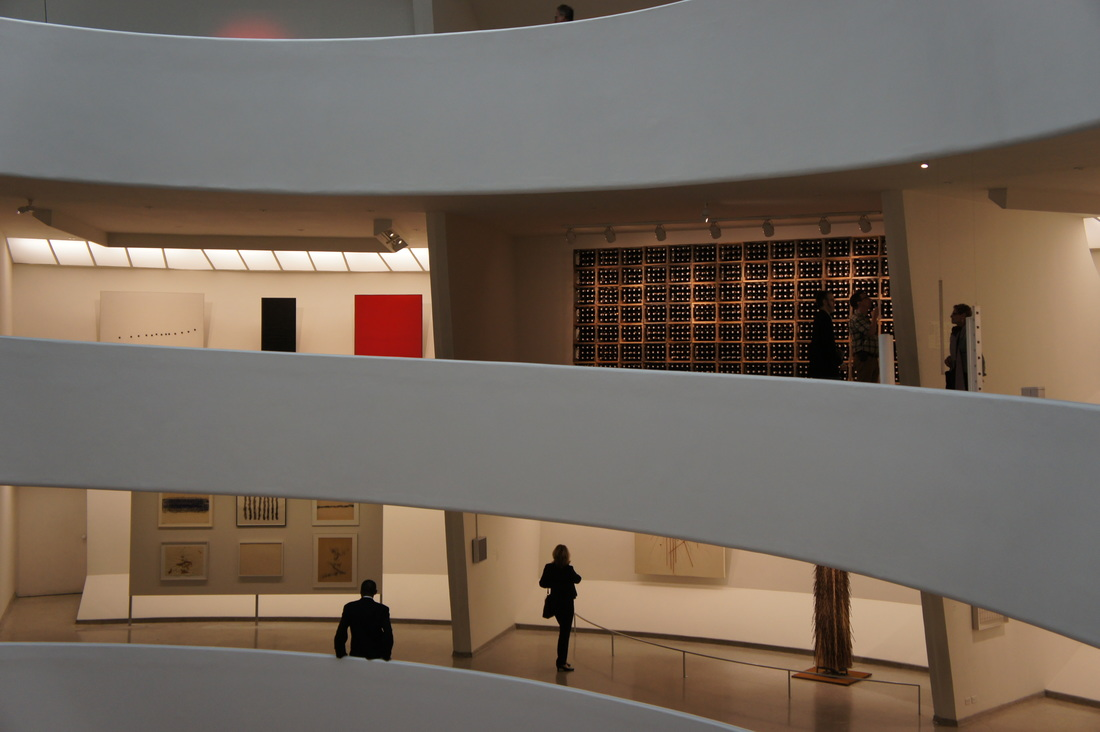
ZERO, Guggenheim, New York

=== Early shows ===
In 1959, artists Pol Bury, Paul van Hoeydonck, Jean Tinguely, and Daniel Spoerri organized Motion in Vision – Vision in Motion, an exhibition at Hessenhuis in Antwerp that for the first time gave ZERO an international audience. This show was the first major ZERO exhibition, after previous shows held at their studio by Mack and Piene in 1957.

In the early 1960s, the artist Henk Peeters presented the international director of the Stedelijk Museum Amsterdam, Willem Sandberg, with monochromatic works of the young European artists' generation. In a close exchange with Mack, Piene, and Günther Uecker, as well as Yves Klein and Piero Manzoni, the original concept was further developed. This was the result of a 1962 exhibition which, besides monochromy, also concerned itself with color, vibration, light, and movement. There were works by European artists, works from North and South America, as well as from Japan. The exhibition was initiated, organized, and financed by the artists themselves. The selection of the participants took place likewise by the artists, without curatorial assistance. The exhibition was accompanied by a jointly developed catalog.

=== Retrospective shows ===
Between 1993 and 1999, four ZERO exhibitions took place at Galerie Villa Merkel in Esslingen, curated by art historian Renate Wiehager. The exhibition series, which was specific to the NUL Group from the Netherlands, ZERO Italy, and ZERO Paris, was completed in 1999 with the exhibition Zero Deutschland 1960. Apart from the three protagonists of the German ZERO movement, Weihager devoted herself to a further twenty artists whose works ranged from the late 1950s to the 1990s. Unlike in the 1960s, this series of exhibitions was not initiated, organized, and financed by the artists themselves. A series of four publications was issued, with a first comprehensive overview of ZERO as a European movement, in four languages: German, English, Dutch, and French.

In 2006, the Museum Kunstpalast in Düsseldorf presented an overview exhibition of the international ZERO movement, with paintings and installations from many countries. Mack, Piene, and Uecker curated their own areas. Jean-Hubert Martin and Mattijs Visser organized the exhibit, with input from Henk Peeters. The exhibition covered several aspects of the exhibitions from the Stedelijk Museum Amsterdam in the form of reconstructions of former installations.

Also in 2006, the Museum der Moderne Salzburg presented 120 works by 50 Zero artists. The works were loaned by the German collectors Gerhard and Anna Lenz, who had been involved with the Zero movement almost from its beginnings. Gerhard had first encountered the Zero group at an exhibition of Piene's work in a Düsseldorf bookshop more in 1963. Starting in 1974, the couple exhibited the collection in 12 shows over 25 years, including in Frankfurt, Barcelona, Moscow, and Warsaw.

In 2013, the Museu Oscar Niemeyer (Curitiba, Brazil) showcased Zero, the largest exhibition ever held in Brazil featuring this group present works by key artists of the movement, alongside Latin American artists such as Hércules Barzotti, Lygia Clark and Abraham Palatnik from Brazil, Gertrud Goldschmidt (GEGO) from Venezuela, and Gyula Kosice from Argentina, all of whom used the same visual languages than the original members in the same time period. This venue traveled to Iberê Camargo Foundation at Porto Alegre, RS, Brazil, and finally was shown in 2014 on Pinacoteca do Estado de São Paulo at São Paulo, Brazil.

Also in 2013, an exhibition at the Neuberger Museum of Art included works from the museum's permanent collection by artists who were part of or exhibited with Group Zero, including Getulio Alviani, Hartmut Böhm, Enrico Castellani, Gianni Colombo, Lucio Fontana, Heinz Mack, Almir Mavignier, Henk Peeters, Otto Piene, Jesús Rafael Soto, Jean Tinguely, Luis Tomasello, and Günther Uecker.

In 2015, ZERO: Countdown to the Future was presented at the Multimedia Art Museum in Moscow and subsequently at the Sakıp Sabancı Museum in Istanbul from 2 September 2015 to 10 January 2016.

Later that year, the Guggenheim Museum showcased the group's work in ZERO: Countdown to Tomorrow, 1950s-60s, an exhibition that featured more than 40 artists from over 10 countries. This was the first large-scale historical survey of the group's work in the United States. The exhibition was initiated by the ZERO foundation.

In 2015 and 2016, this exhibit toured to the Martin-Gropius-Bau in Berlin and the Stedelijk Museum in Amsterdam. Various subjects – articulated in time, space, color, reflection, vibration, light, and movement – showed works of art from the central years of the ZERO movement from 1957 to 1967. With around 40 artists, the exhibition followed the ZERO spirit, from two-dimensional paintings to the three-dimensional space. At the Martin-Gropius-Bau, artists from Germany, Italy, France, Belgium, the Netherlands, Venezuela, Switzerland, Japan, the US, and Brazil were represented with around 200 works and ten space-filling installations. Among them were some rare works from renowned collections such as the Georges Pompidou Center, the Morsbroich Museum, the Stedelijk Museum in Amsterdam, and the Museum of Fine Arts in Düsseldorf. In addition, for the first time, works by several artists were shown: Manzoni, Verheyen, Fontana, Tinguely, Klein, Mack, and Piene. The highlight of the collaboration was the space-saving historical installation Lichtraum (Hommage à Fontana) by Mack, Piene, and Uecker, which was presented for the first time at the Documenta III 1964 exhibition. Mack presented an installation as an homage to his ZERO friends. Exhibitions and events were documented using previously unpublished photos and videos.

In 2018, the Museum of Old and New Art (Hobart, Tasmania) organized a large show around the theme of Vibration, with historical old and reconstructed installations, the first major show of ZERO in Australia. The exhibition included large installations by Castellani, Gianni Colombo, Mack, Peeters, Piene, Soto, Tinguely, and Uecker. A separate section was, for the first time in a ZERO show, dedicated to "father figures" of the movement: Victor Vasarely, Marcel Duchamp, and Lucio Fontana.

== ZERO Foundation ==
The ZERO Foundation is a German cultural institute established in December 2008, with support of Düsseldorf-based ZERO artists, Heinz Mack, Otto Piene, and Günther Uecker (or their estates), along with Museum Kunst Palast. It is funded by the state capital, Düsseldorf. The artists donated works as well as their archives from the ZERO period comprising photographs, correspondence, invitation cards, newspaper clippings, and other documents. The foundation was set up by Mattijs Visser, who led it from 2009 to 2017.

Organisation

- Staff: Dr. Barbara Könches, director; Dr. Tiziana Caianiello, Katrin Lohe, Laura Weber, Thekla Zell
- Board of Directors: Dr. Friderike Bagel, Claus Gielisch, Dr. Felix Krämer, Harry Schmitz, Professor Dr. Jürgen Wilhelm

=== Background ===
The foundation was established in 2008, with a founding mission to preserve, present, study, and support the work of the international ZERO movement.

The founding artists donated numerous works and their archives from the ZERO period, including photographs, correspondence, posters, invitations, press articles, and magazines. Additional works and documents were collected and shared through exhibitions and publications. These efforts include both the initial period (1958–1966) and the continuing impact of the work. The foundation's archive and library are available for research purposes.

The living artists whose work it covers are actively involved in its work, an continue to share first-hand information about the ZERO era.

=== Other research ===
Visser went on to found the 0-Institute, focused on presenting the works and documents of international artists associated with ZERO, in a contemporary context.

== Art market ==
In 2010, Sotheby's auctioned off part the collection of Gerhard and Anna Lenz in London. Initially valued at 12 million pounds ($19.5 million), the 49 paintings, drawings and low-relief panels made up from a variety of media were sold in an evening auction reaching £54.07 million, or about $84.5 million; unusual for a contemporary art sale, 74 of the 77 lots offered sold.
