= Heinz Mack =

German artist

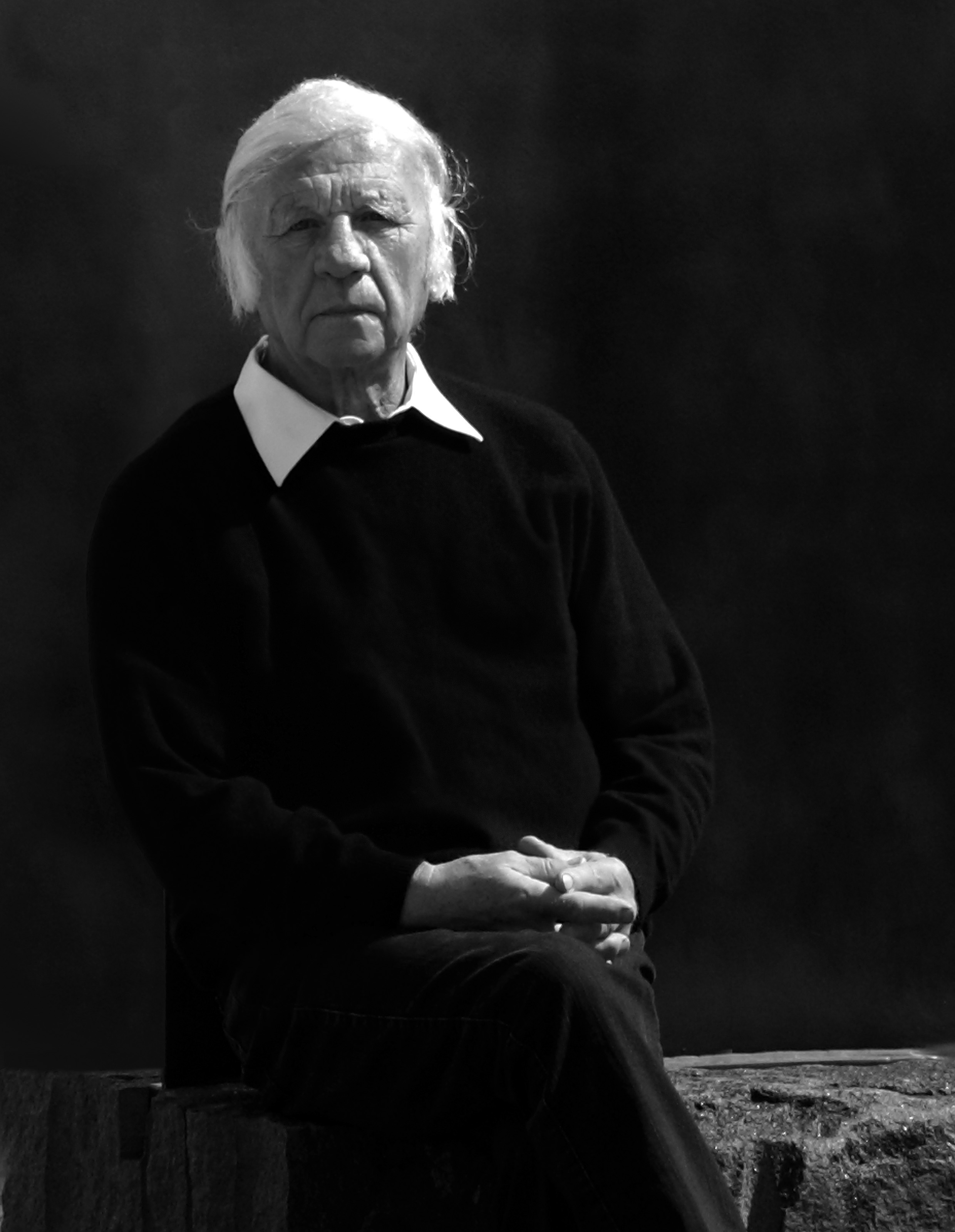
- Heinz Mack 2008
- Born: Heinz Mack; 8 March 1931 (age 95); Lollar, People's State of Hesse, Germany
- Known for: op art, light art and kinetic art
- Movement: Zero (art)

Heinz Mack (born 8 March 1931) is a German artist. Together with Otto Piene he founded the ZERO movement in 1957. He exhibited works at documenta in 1964 and 1977 and he represented Germany at the 1970 Venice Biennale. He is best known for his contributions to op art, light art and kinetic art.

== Biography ==
Heinz Mack was born in 1931 in the small town of Lollar in Germany. Between 1950 and 1956 he studied at the Kunstakademie Düsseldorf. In 1957 together with Otto Piene he started a series of what were called Abendausstellungen (evening exhibitions) at their studio in Düsseldorf. This series was the initial event for the formation of the group ZERO (with Mack, Piene and Günther Uecker as its nucleus) and the international ZERO movement. Among the participants of the ZERO movement were Yves Klein, Lucio Fontana, Piero Manzoni and Jean Tinguely.

In the early 1960s, Mack worked, with Gotthard Graubner, as an art teacher at the Lessing Gymnasium, Düsseldorf. In 1964 Mack, Piene and Uecker arranged the "ZERO Lichtraum (Hommage á Lucio Fontana)" at the 1964 documenta in Kassel. From 1964 to 1966 Mack lived and worked in New York, where the Howard Wise Gallery presented a solo exhibition in 1966.

Although known for his minimalist outdoor sculptures, Mack also produced smaller works, both static and kinetic. Light Dynamo #2' from 1966, in the collection of the Honolulu Museum of Art, is an example of his rotating disc kinetic sculptures. Since 1991, he has been producing brightly colored, abstract, paintings in acrylic.

1970 Mack was invited as visiting professor to Osaka, Japan. In the same year he represented Germany at the 1970 Venice Biennale (together with Günther Uecker, Georg Karl Pfahler and Thomas Lenk). For the 1972 Summer Olympics in Munich he created an illuminated "Wasserwolke" (Water cloud). In 1972 he was asked to create a 230 ft tall sculpture for the United Nations headquarters in New York (not realized).

== Solo exhibitions ==
- 1957: Galerie Schmela, Düsseldorf
- 1966: Howard Wise Gallery, New York
- 1972: Musée d’Art Moderne de la Ville de Paris
- 1972: Galerie Denise René, New York
- 1977: Kunsthalle Düsseldorf
- 1981: Galerie Lauter, Mannheim
- 1989: Galerie Neher, Essen
- 1992: Galerie Lauter, Mannheim
- 1993: Galerie Schoeller, Düsseldorf
- 1998: Liechtensteinische Staatliche Kunstsammlungen, Vaduz
- 2001: Galerie Denise René, Paris
- 2001: Tehran Museum of Contemporary Art, Theran
- 2004: Galerie Geiger, Konstanz
- 2006: Beck & Eggeling International Fine Art, Düsseldorf
- 2006: Pergamonmuseum and Museum of Islamic Art, Berlin
- 2009: Ludwig Museum, Koblenz
- 2016: MACK: Just Light and Colour, Sakıp Sabancı Museum, Istanbul
- 2022: Biblioteca Nazionale Marciana, Venice

== Gallery ==
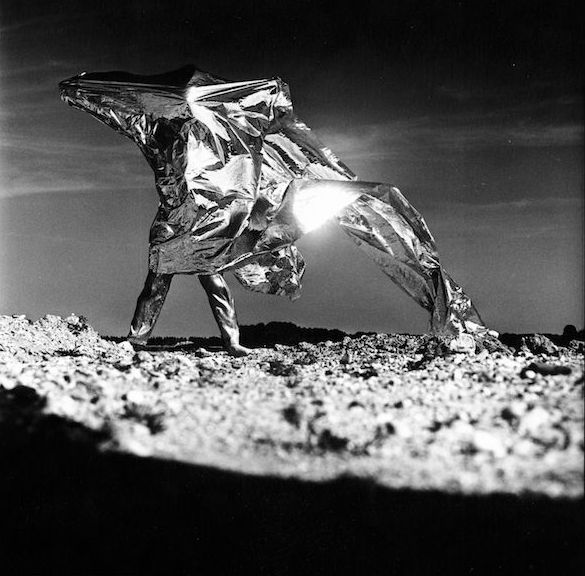
Heinz Mack by Lothar Wolleh

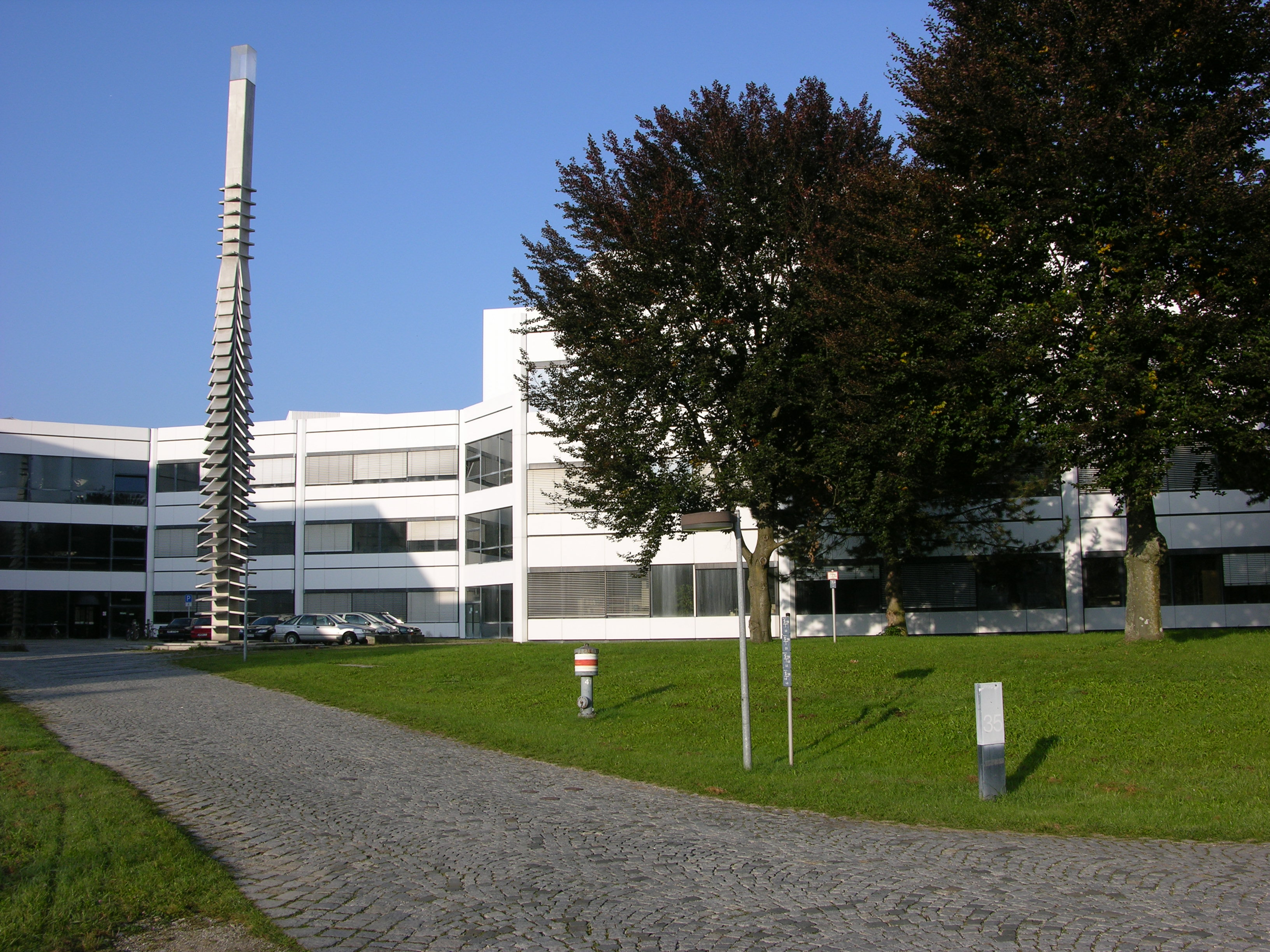
Sculpture for the Sky (1976), university library of the University of the Bundeswehr Munich, Neubiberg

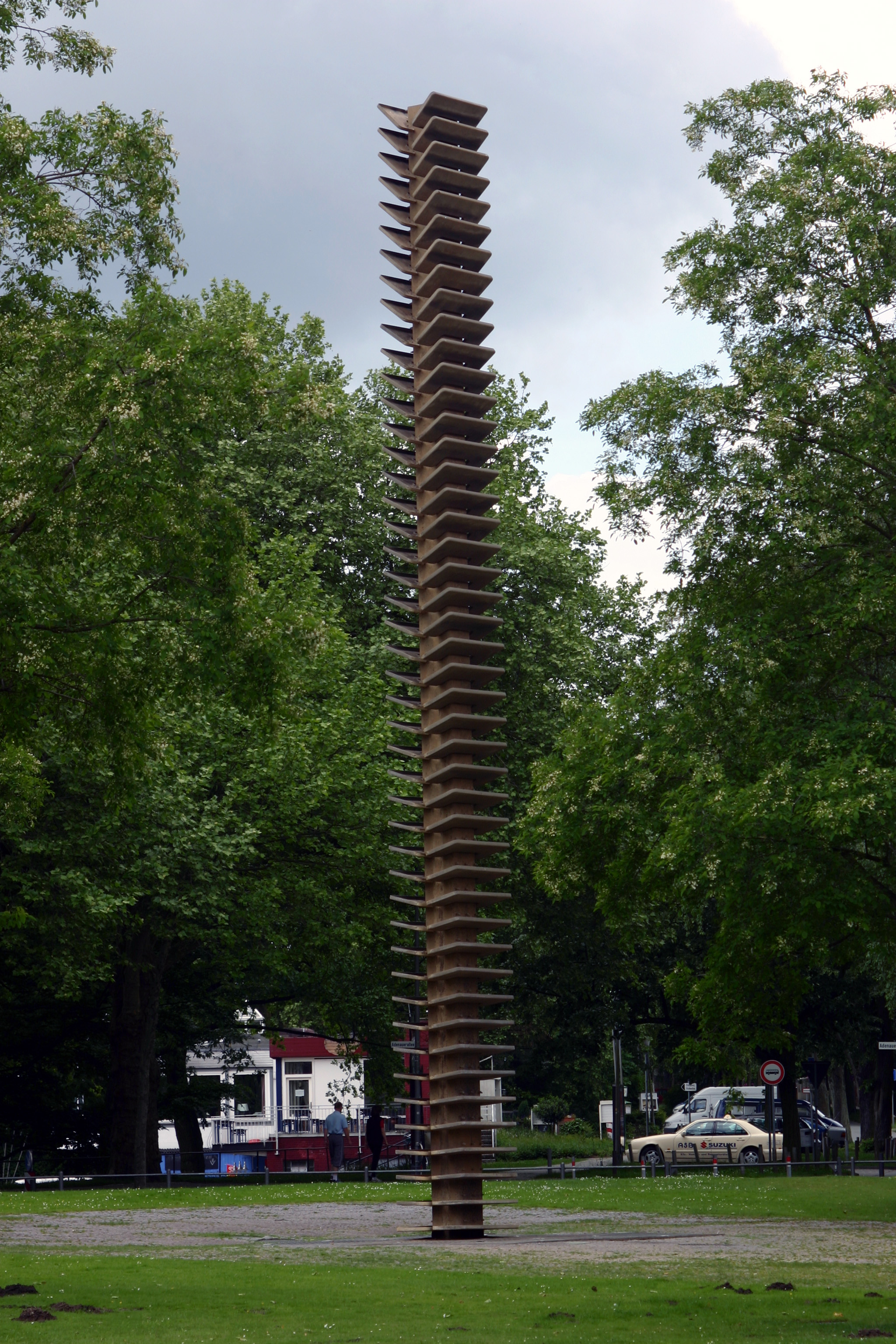
Water Sculpture (1977), Münster

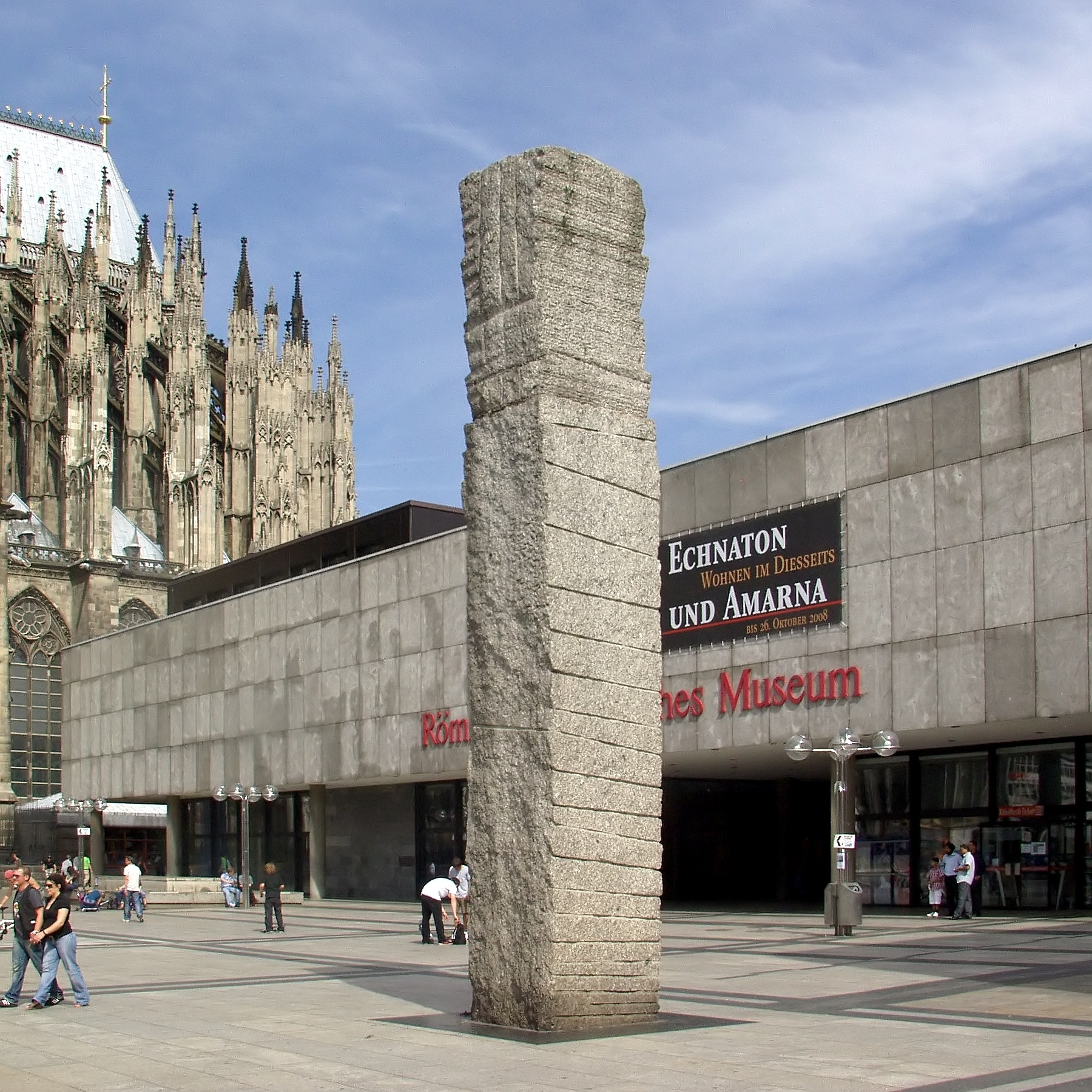
Columne pro Caelo (1984), Roncalliplatz, Cologne

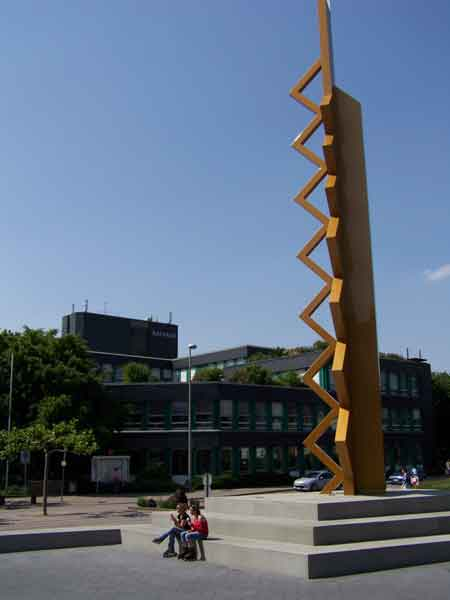
Großer Vertikaler Rhythmus (2008), Langenfeld

== Publications ==
- Heinz Mack. TRANSIT – zwischen Okzident und Orient. Faszination und Inspiration der Islamischen Kultur im Werk des Künstlers – ein Werkaspekt 1950-2006. Museum für Islamische Kunst, Pergamonmuseum, Berlin. Exhib.: 7 October 2006 – 21 January 2007. ISBN 978-3-8321-7755-3.
- Heinz Mack – Licht der ZERO-Zeit. Ludwig Museum im Deutschherrenhaus, Koblenz. Exhib.: 30 August – 1 November 2009. ISBN 978-3-86678-334-8
