= Avenza–Carrara railway =

Railway line in Italy

Coordinates: 44.051183°N 10.062860°E

Avenza–Carrara
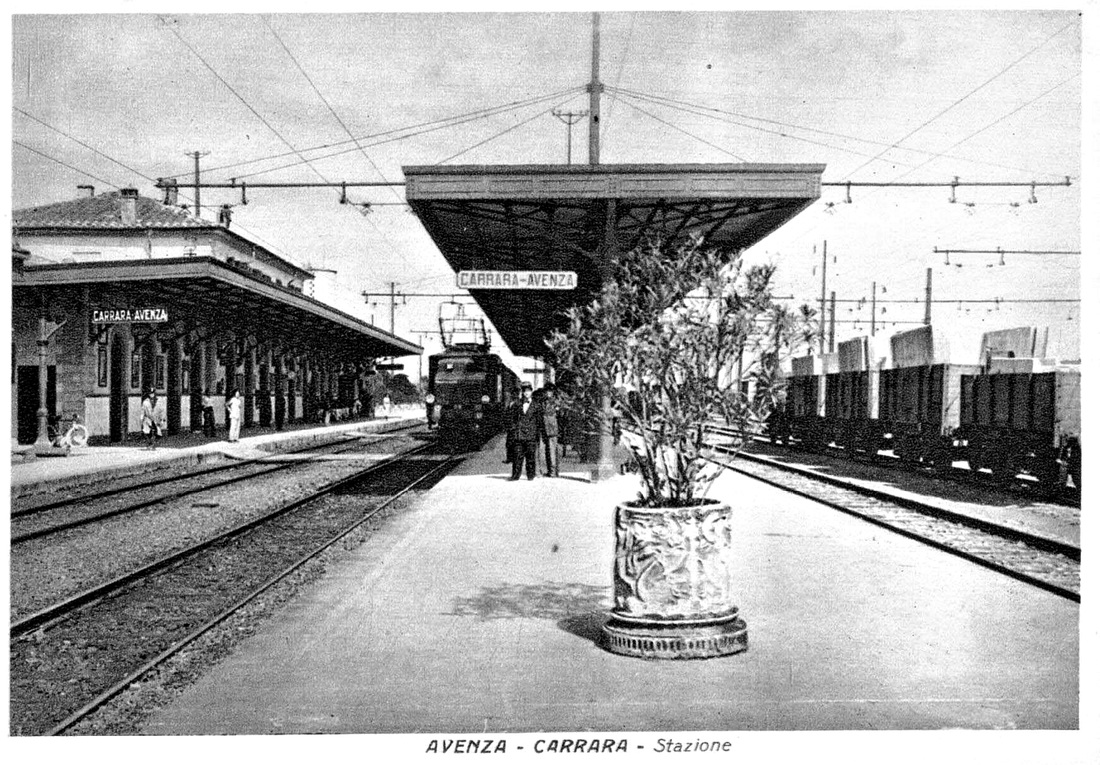
- Trains at Avenza station in the 1930s

Overview
- Status: Suppressed
- Owner: Ferrovie dello Stato
- Locale: Carrara (Italy)
- Termini: Avenza; Carrara
- Stations: 2

Service
- Operator(s): FS
- Rolling stock: mixed

History
- Opened: 1866
- Closed: 1969

Technical
- Line length: 4,499 km (2,796 mi)
- Number of tracks: Single track
- Track gauge: 1,435 mm (4 ft 8 1/2 in)
Route map
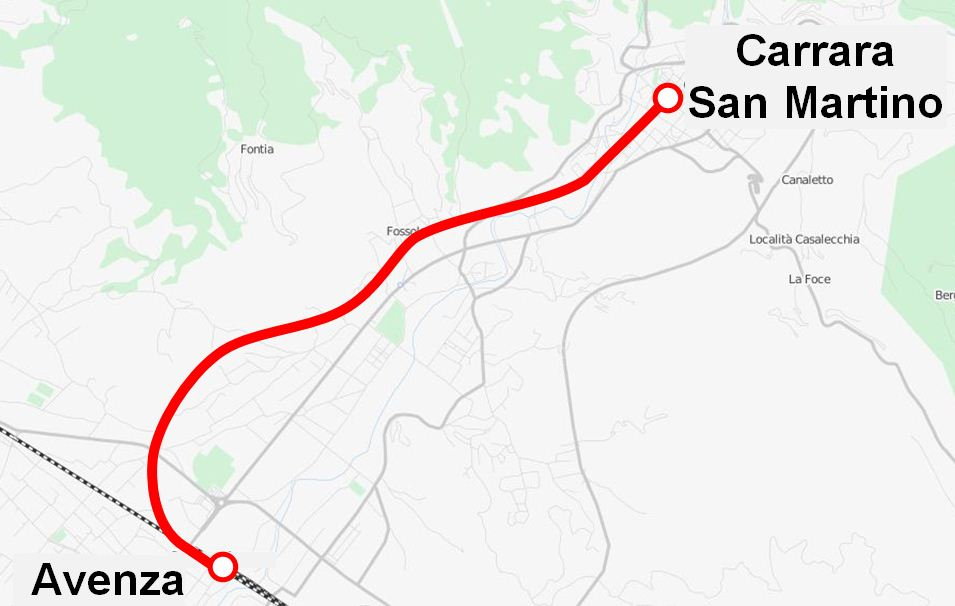

The Avenza–Carrara railway was a short line connecting the center of Carrara with the locality of Avenza, falling in the same municipality, on which there was and still there is a station of the Genoa-Pisa railway. Opened in 1866, the line constituted later an element of the Carrara Private Marble railway; after the closure of the latter it remained in service as goods connection until the closure to traffic in 1969. The definitive suppression was established by Decree of the President of the Republic no. 1459 of December 28, 1970.

== History ==
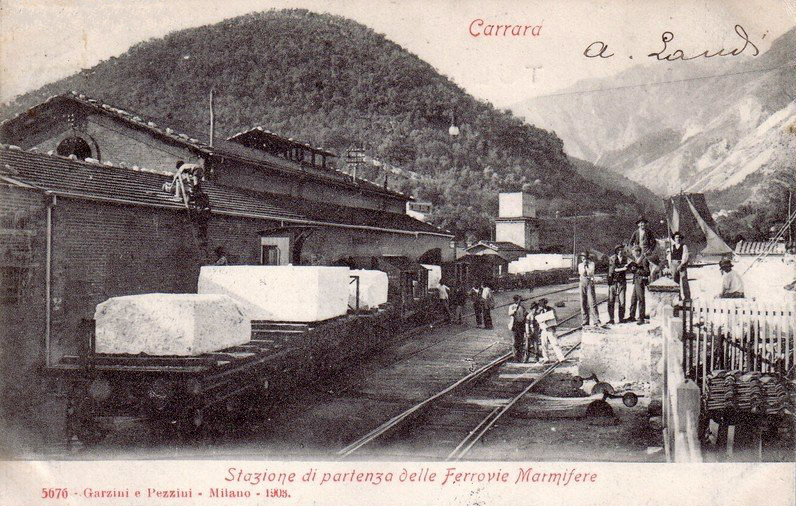
The cargo area of the station Carrara (vintage postcard)

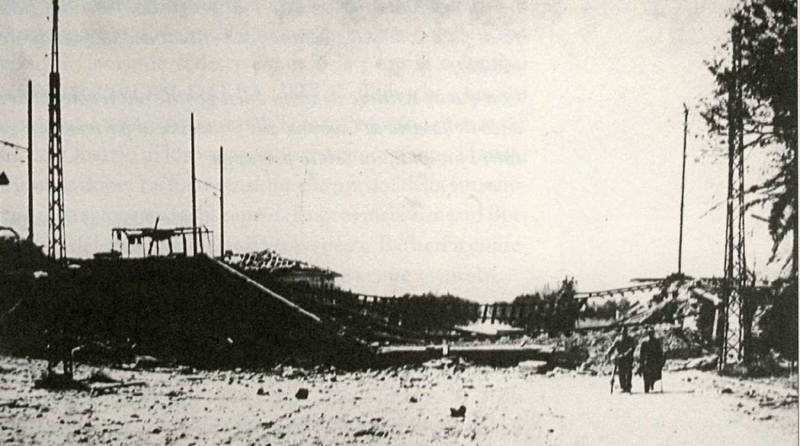
The bridge of Anderlino, with two arches, shot down in 1945

The construction of the line began on July 17, 1863, following the decision of the Minister of Public Works, just two months after the inauguration of the station of Avenza.

It was officially inaugurated on September 10, 1866, curated by the Società per le strade ferrate dell'Alta Italia.

In 1876, the station of Carrara became passing, with the opening of the railroad Marmifera heading toward the quarries of marble of Colonnata, which exploited the pre-existing connection to transfer the goods to the station of Avenza and, hence, to the port of Carrara.

The line was involved in the trafficking of Anderlino bridge with two arches by a bombing in 1945, that destroyed the latter. Following this event the bridges were rebuilt.

With the conventions of 1885, the railway line was ceded to the Rete Mediterranea before moving in 1905 to the newly formed Ferrovie dello Stato, which kept it in operation until 1969. The official suppression was established by Decree of the President of the Republic no. 1459, December 28, 1970.

== Characteristics ==
4.499 kilometers long, the line branched off from the west side compared to the passenger building of Avenza railway station, later called Carrara-Avenza and, dealt a curve detected and bypassed the Aurelia, it pointed towards the center of the town of marble.

The terminus was located at the coeval station of Carrara San Martino, so named for its efforts in this regard by the carrarese general Domenico Cucchiari, renaissance fighter who had distinguished himself at the Battle of San Martino.

Along the way there were some booths, one of which is identified in Agricola street no. 121.

== Traffic ==
If the freight traffic was to characterize the line, thanks to the connection of the Marmifera railway and to the freight station of St. Martino which itself acted as a collector for some stone industries, to it was also summed up in the early times of operation, the passengers traffic. The latter in 1933 consisted of 4 pairs of mixed FS trains employing 18 minutes to connect the two locations.

== See also ==
- History of rail transport in Italy
- Carrara
- Carrara-Avenza railway station
- Carrara San Martino railway station
- Carrara Private Marble railway
