= Marmifera =

Railway line to standard gauge, from 1876 to 1964

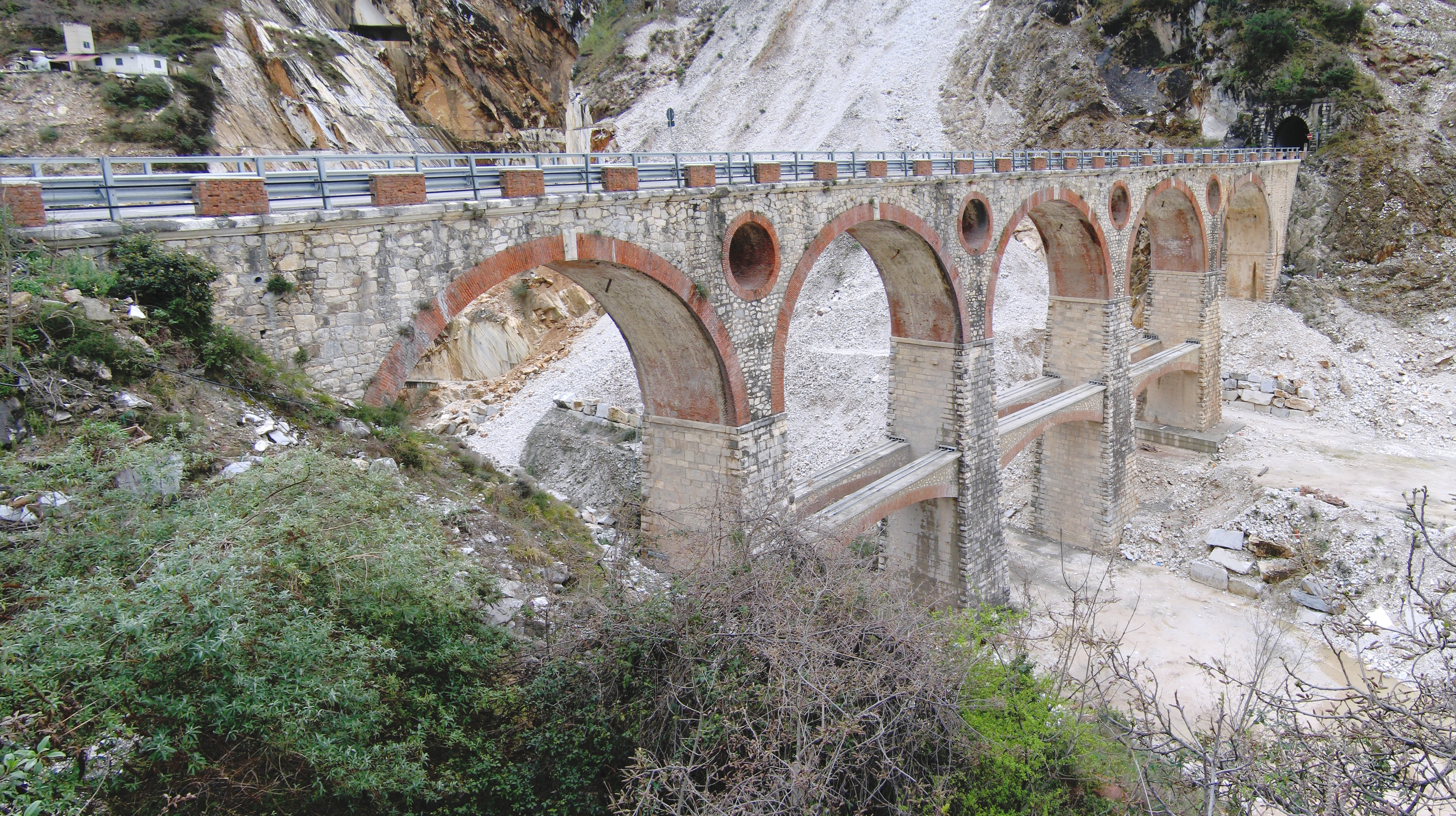
- Viaduct of Vara

Overview
- Status: Suppressed
- Owner: Società Ferrovia Marmifera Privata di Carrara
- Locale: Carrara (Italy)
- Termini: Colonnata; Marina di Carrara
- Stations: 17

Service
- Operator(s): SFAI
- Rolling stock: ?

History
- Opened: 1876
- Closed: 1964

Technical
- Line length: 16.50 km (10.25 mi)
- Number of tracks: Single track
- Track gauge: 1,435 mm (4 ft 8 1/2 in)

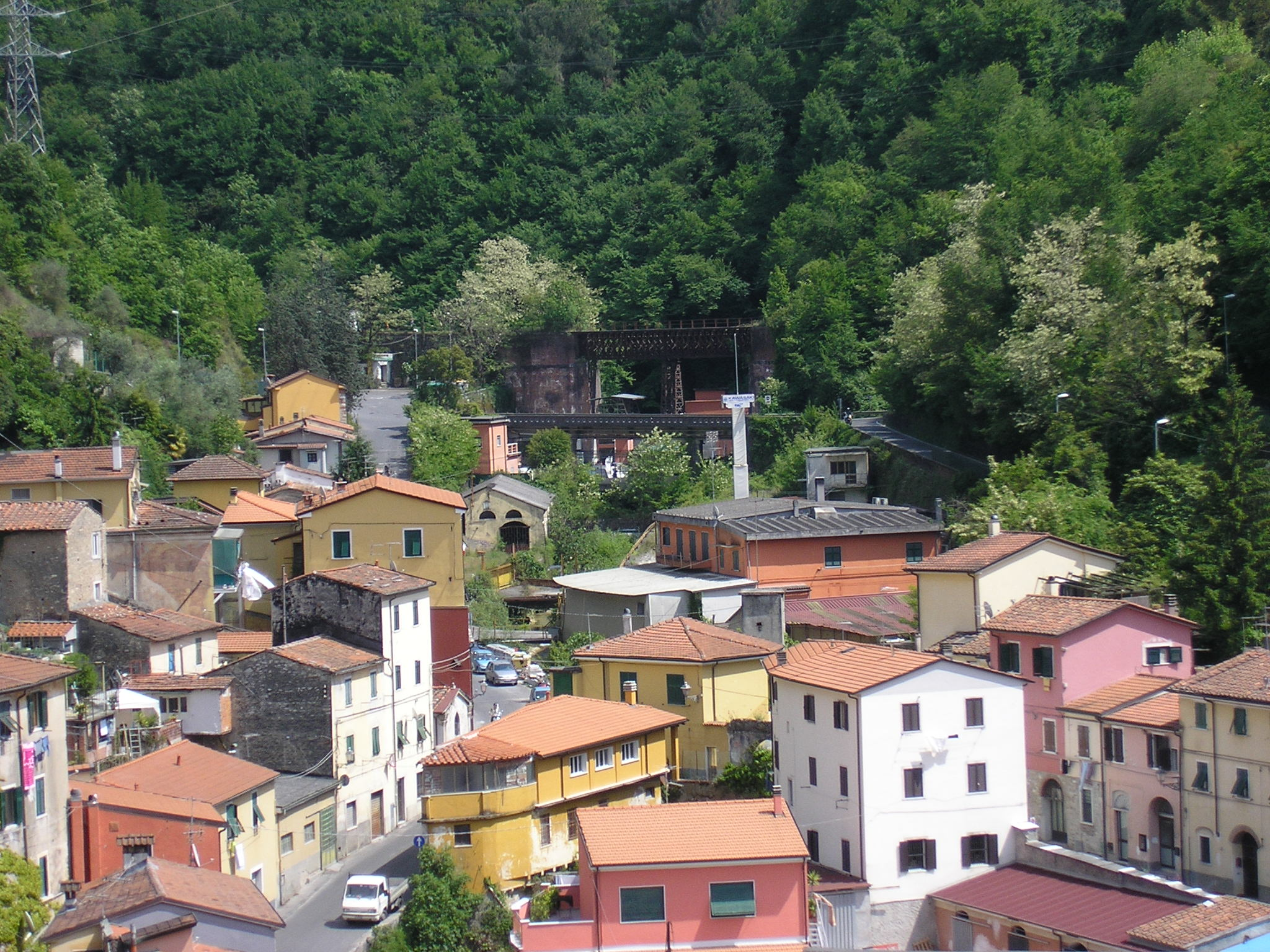
The iron gate at Caina, near Carrara Monterosso station

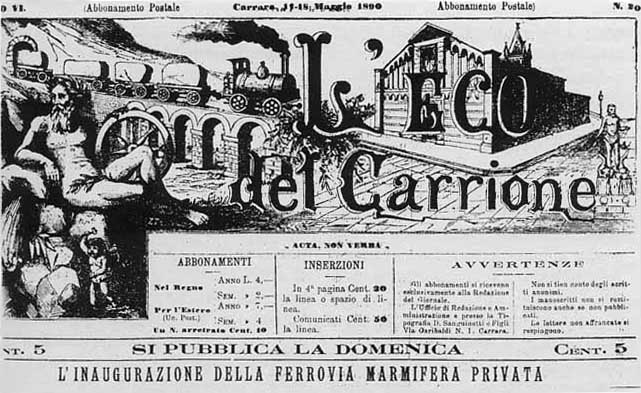
Front page of L'eco del Carrione (1890) announcing the inauguration of the entire line

The Marmifera, full name Italian: Ferrovia Marmifera Privata di Carrara, lit. 'private marble railway of Carrara', was an Italian industrial railway used for the transport of Carrara marble from the quarries of the municipal territory of Carrara, Tuscany. The route extended from the hillside village of Colonnata to the port of Marina di Carrara.

== History ==
The railway, projected in 1866, was inaugurated in 1876 and was connected to the pre-existent Avenza-Carrara railway (1866), linking the main station of Carrara Avenza to Carrara San Martino, in city centre. A subsequent expansion to the quarries below the Apuan Alps (Gioia, Ravaccione-Polvaccio and Colonnata) was proposed in 1885. Work began in 1887 and the new branch was inaugurated on 15 May 1890. The line was owned by the FMC (Società Ferrovia Marmifera Privata di Carrara) and operated by the SFAI (Società per le strade ferrate dell'Alta Italia).

Even if its bridges were damaged by bombings and sabotages during the Second World War, the line was practically in continuous operation from 1876 to 1964, when it was closed due to competition from road traffic. In 1969 it was closed also the passenger route Avenza-Carrara and the rail tracks dismantled.

Nowadays, apart from the Avenza FS station, the only area in which the railway is operating is the port of Carrara, connected to the Pisa-La Spezia-Genoa line with a pair of industrial lines. It is part of a route of industrial archaeology and, since 2003 its stations, quarries and bridges over the Vara, have been included in the Archaeological Park of the Apuan Alps.

== Route ==
The railway line started in the hill village of Colonnata and, following a tortuous path, connects some hill hamlets of Carrara, as Miseglia and Torano, and several quarries, through some branches. Subsequently, the railway runs through the city of Carrara and, from San Martino to Avenza station follows a path almost parallel to that of the passenger line. From Avenza FS station to the port, in Marina di Carrara, the line follows a straight parallel to that of the former tramway, with a small branch to the station of Covetta. The only stations passenger service was the one from Avenza to San Martino stations.

Station	Km	Notes
Colonnata	0.00	Serving the quarry Gioia
Fantiscritti		
Ravaccione		
Tarnone	1.00	Junctions to Fantiscritti and Ravaccione quarries
Miseglia Superiore	4.00	
Canalie	5.00	
Torano	6.00	Junction to Piastra quarry
Miseglia Inferiore	8.00	Junction to Canalie quarry
Carrara Monterosso	9.00	Junction branch from Carrara S. Martino station
Carrara San Martino	10.50	Passenger station of the Avenza-Carrara line
Peghini (Carrara)		Junction branch from Carrara San Martino station
Fiorino (Carrara)		Junction branch from Avenza station
Carrara-Avenza	13.00	FS station on the Pisa-Genoa line Junction to the port of Carrara and the former tramway line
Covetta (Carrara)		Junction branch from Avenza station
Marina di Carrara	16.50	Port of Carrara

== See also ==
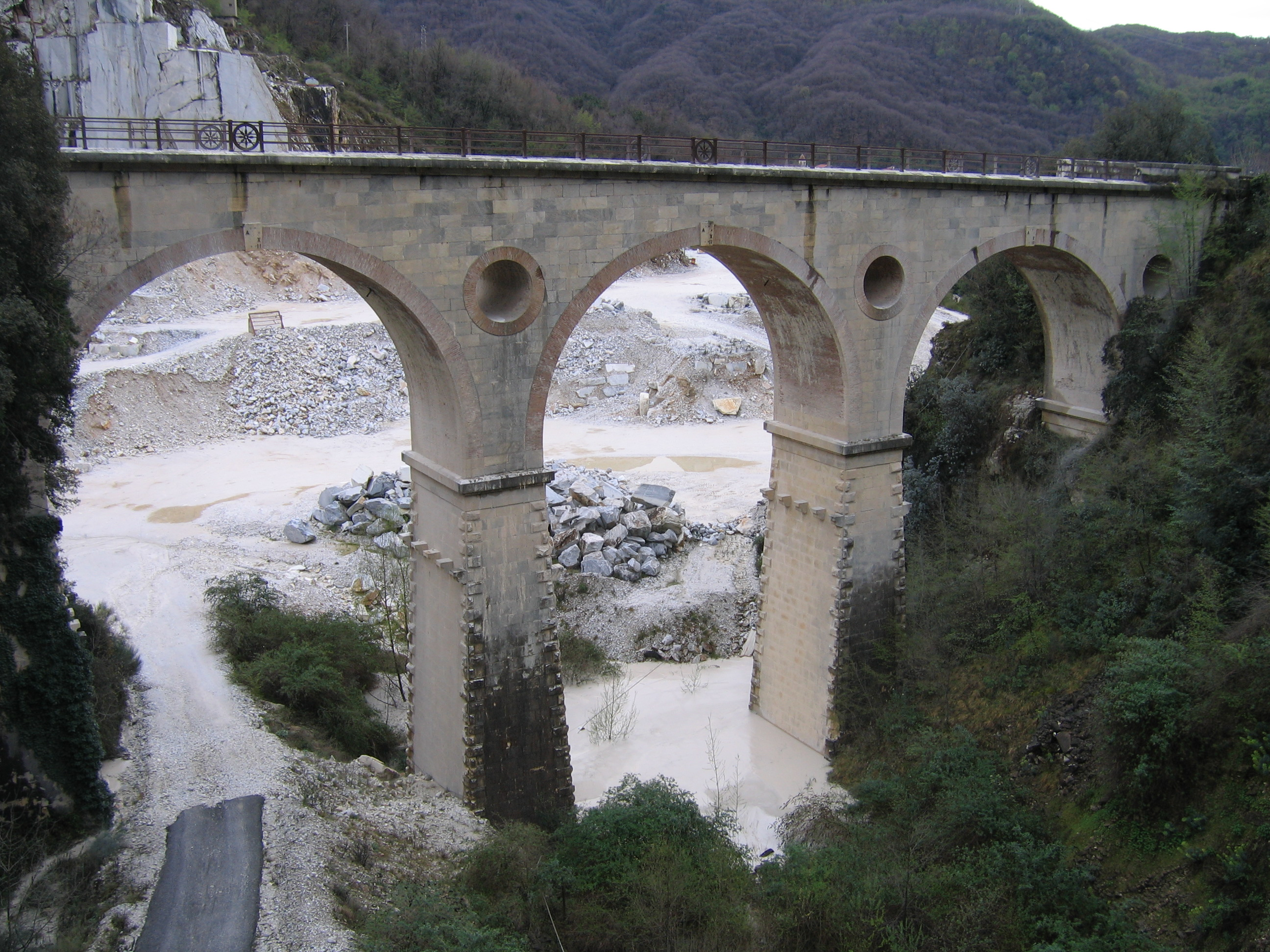
Detail of the viaduct over the Vara

- Carrara marble
- Avenza-Carrara railway
- Lizza di Piastreta
