= Carrara–Avenza railway station =

Italian railway station

Carrara–Avenza
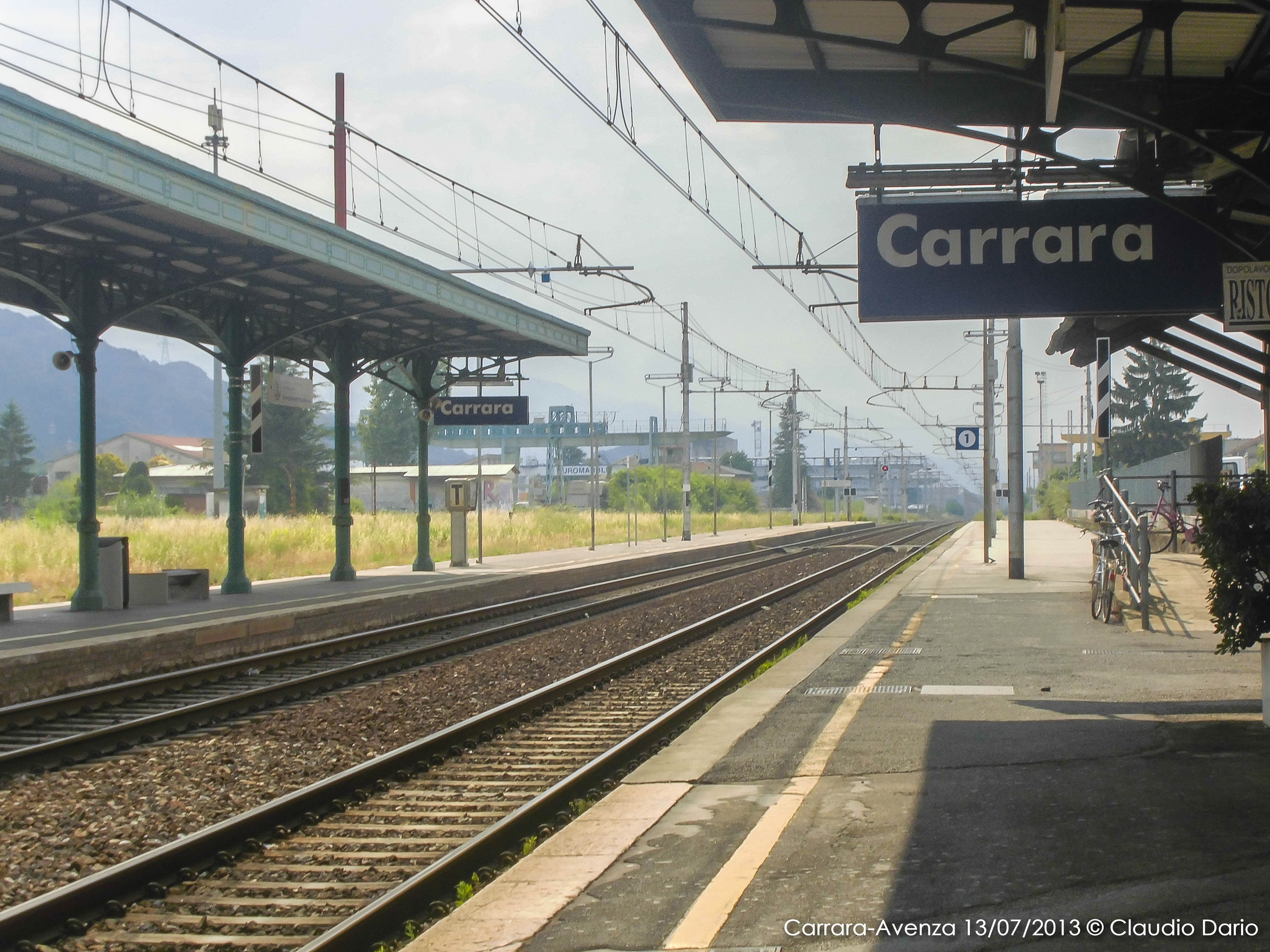
- Platforms of the train station

General information
- Location: Carrara, Avenza, via Petacchi; Carrara, Massa and Carrara, Tuscany; Italy
- Coordinates: 44°03′04″N 10°03′46″E
- Owner: RFI
- Lines: Genova–Pisa railway Carrara Private Marble railway (suspended); Avenza–Carrara railway (suspended); Industrial junctions of Carrara
- Platforms: 2 since 2012; 13 until 1980
- Train operators: Trenitalia
- Connections: SITA tramway † (1915–1955); CAT Carrara bus † 2009 (Carrara-Marinella di Sarzana trolleybus † 1985) ATN bus

Other information
- Classification: Silver

History
- Opened: 15 May 1863; 163 years ago
- Rebuilt: 1960; 1980
- Electrified: In 1926 with three-phase system. Converted to continuous electric current system on April 1947
- Former names: Apuania Carrara (1939–1949); Avenza (1863–1925)
Location
- Location within Tuscany Location within Italy

Carrara–Avenza railway station, also known simply as Carrara or Avenza, is a railway station of the city of Carrara, Italy. It is located on the Genova–Pisa line. It is the only station serving the Tuscan city, after the closure of Carrara San Martino in 1969.

== History ==
The station was opened on 26 December 1862, with the name of "Avenza", as part of the railway section between Sarzana and Massa.

On 10 September 1866, the station became a branch point of a short connection with Carrara (Carrara San Martino Station) of 4.5 km. In 1876 the Ferrovia Marmifera Privata di Carrara ('private marble railway of Carrara') was opened so 6 more platforms were installed and available to the marble traffic.

On 20 May 1915, in the underpass road Viale XX Settembre, in the immediate vicinity of the station, began to pass convoys of the electric tramway for the connection to the fraction of Marina: 6.3 km long the tramway was electrified at direct voltage of 600 V, the line had the standard gauge of 1,445 mm. The tram service was definitively suppressed in 1955 for the installation of a trolleybus.

In 1939 the station, then called "Carrara-Avenza," took on the new name of "Apuania Carrara" with the institution of the comune of Apuania; the previous name was restored in the 1949, with the abolition of the former municipality first mentioned in 1946.

The traffic coming from the marble railway definitively ceased with its suppression, which occurred on 15 May 1964. The elimination of the branch with Carrara San Martino dates back to 28 February 1969. In June 2012 the platforms used for the movement of marble goods were removed.

With the decline of freight traffic, RFI decided the transformation from station to halt, starting December 2012.

== Overview ==
The station has two platforms for passenger transport. Until June 2012 it had a third that was used for trains from Firenze Santa Maria Novella. With this third there were also another six for freight trains that, among other things, since 1964 doesn't stop anymore at the station.

The two shelters that it owns are connected by an underpass.

=== Passenger building ===
The passenger building is composed of a single body with rectangular plan. To the east of PB, there is a small garden of the 20th century characterized by the presence of trees such as pines and firs and a large palm that is there from the opening of the station, there are also two fountains, a little to drink and a big. Both do not work anymore.

=== Railway view ===
- Track 1: the main track for trains to Pisa. To La Spezia are also present some railway switches that allow trains to switch from track 1–2;
- Track 2: the main track for trains to La Spezia. This track in particular had a connection with the track 3;
- Track 3: it was used mainly used for trains from Firenze SMN terminal that were in the station. This deeper, towards La Spezia, ended with a bumper and right behind that there is a similar structure or a toll booth;
- Tracks 4-5-6-7-8: they were work tracks all branched from a single platform from the second railway bridge in the direction of Carrara San Martino of the closed Avenza-Carrara railway. The track 8 was not equipped with electrification unlike the other 4.
- Separated goods track: it was a track to the right looking towards Pisa. Until the 2004 it had also the electrification and a light signal. In 2005 it was deprived of both. It was finally removed with the other trunk binaries in 2012. This track was also used in the past by the Marmifera railway for connection to the port of Marina di Carrara. In 2008 it was paved with the lengthening of the shelter;

All the tracks 3-4-6 and the separated goods track were removed in June 2012.

== Services ==
The station, that in 2007 was frequented by an average of 1,000 people a day, can offer services such as:

- Ticket machine
- Tickets at door
- Waiting room
- Parking
- Bar
- Underpass
- Newsstand
- Bathroom
- Restaurant
- Public telephone
- Taxi stop
- ATN autobus lines stop
- Bicycles parking
- Video security
- Speaker for trains arrivals, transits and departures

== Gallery ==
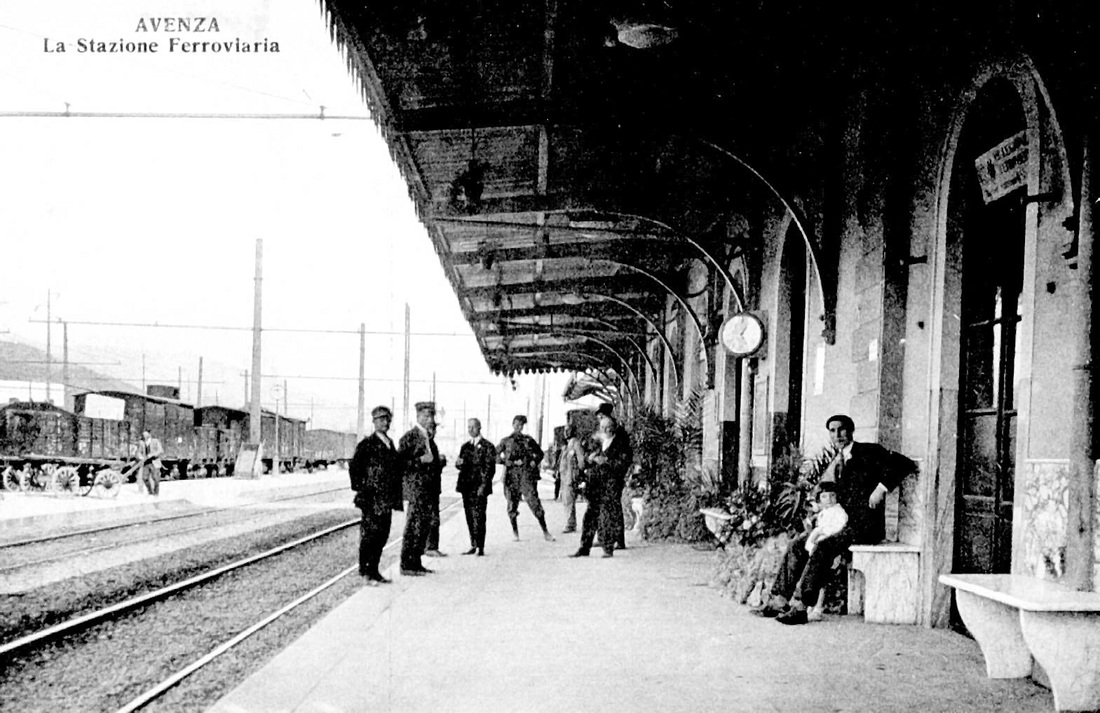
View of the first shelter of the station in 1925

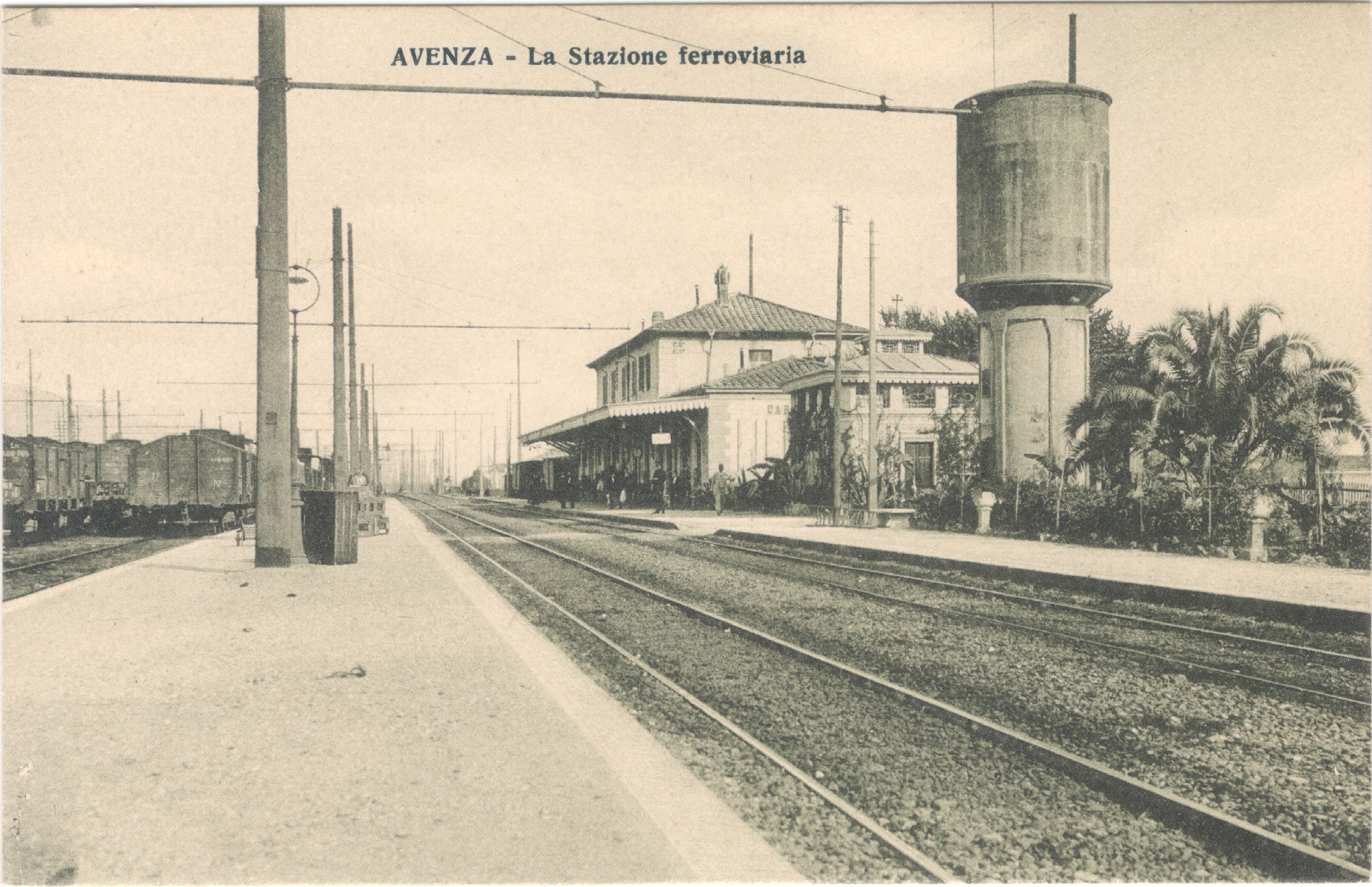
A view from the northern part of the station of Avenza in the mid-1920s

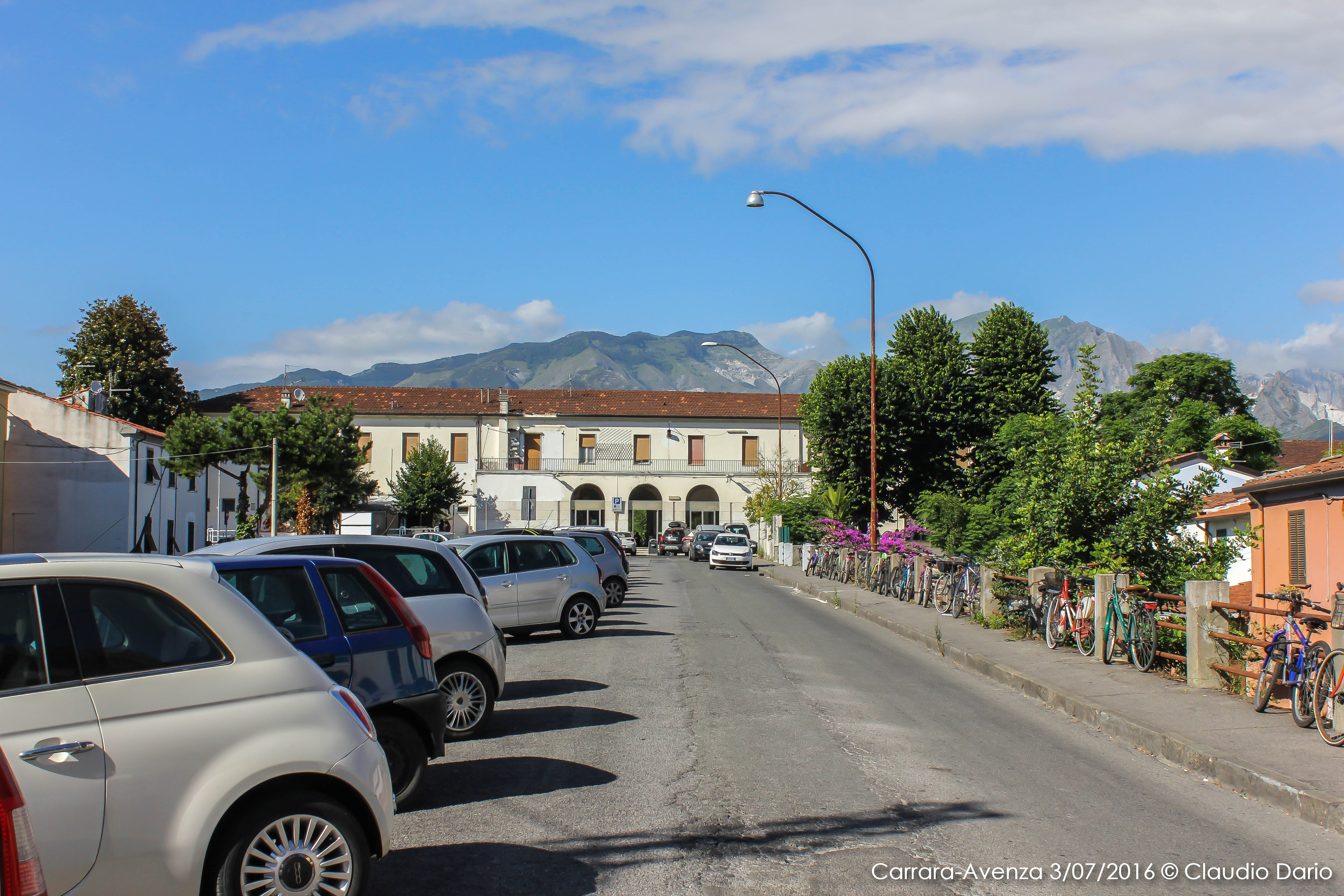
View of the main building in 2016

== See also ==
- History of rail transport in Italy
- Avenza
- Carrara
- Carrara San Martino railway station
- Avenza–Carrara railway

== Sources ==
- Collezione celerifera delle leggi, decreti, istruzioni e circolari, Parte 1, tipografia reale, Firenze, 1871.
- Stamperia reale, Raccolta ufficiale delle leggi e dei decreti del Regno d'Italia, Firenze, 1871.
- Stamperia reale, Collezione delle leggi ed atti del governo del Regno d'Italia, Firenze, 1871.
- Luigi di Giacomo Pirola, Raccolta degli atti ufficiali del governo sulle leggi, decreti, istruzioni, circolari ecc., Milano, 1871.
- Parlamento italiano, Atti parlamentari della Camera dei deputati - Volume 6, tipografia Eredi Botta, tipografi della camera dei Deputati, Roma, 1873.
- Istituto poligrafico e Zecca dello Stato, Raccolta ufficiale degli atti normativi della Repubblica italiana, volume 14, 1874.
- Commissione d'inchiesta sull'esercizio delle ferrovie italiane, Atti - Parte 3, 1881.
- Strade Ferrate del Mediterraneo, Album dei Piani Generali delle stazioni, fermate, cave, cantieri, officine e diramazioni a Stabilimenti privati alla data 1º gennaio 1894, Tip. Lit. Direz. Gen. Ferr. Mediterraneo, Milano, 1895. Tavola 133 e 67 (1899). Stazione di Avenza, stazione di Luni, stazione di Sarzana.
- Bollettino dei trasporti e dei viaggi in ferrovia, 1902.
- Parlamento italiano, Atti parlamentari - Volume 6, 1903.
- Rivista generale delle ferrovie e dei lavori pubblici, Volume 23, 1905.
- Direzione generale delle Ferrovie dello Stato, Relazione a S. E. il ministro dei lavori pubblici sull'andamento dell' amministrazione delle Ferrovie dello Stato, 1906.
- Touring Club Italiano, Luigi Vittorio Bertarelli, Guida d'Italia del Touring club italiano, 1916.
- Landi A., Costruzione di due sottopassaggi a tre luci con piattabande in cemento armato, pel viale Carrara-Marina presso la stazione di Avenza, in corrispondenza alle linee linee Pisa-Spezia e Avenza-Carrara in Rivista Tecnica delle Ferrovie Italiane, Indice sistematico 1912-1942, gennaio 1916.
- Gazzetta Ufficiale del Regno d'Italia N. 191 del 23 Agosto 1938, parte prima, Roma, Istituto Poligrafico Dello Stato.
- Centro di Studi per lo Geografia Antropica, Memorie di geografia antropica, 1952.
- Azienda autonoma delle Ferrovie dello Stato, Relazione annuale 1971, 1972.
- Azienda autonoma delle Ferrovie dello Stato, Relazione annuale 1976, 1977.
- Paola Bianchi e Laura Ricci, Inventario dell'archivio della ferrovia Marmifera Privata di Carrara, Tomo 1, biblioteca civica di Carrara, 2001.
  - Carteggio tra Pietro Bologna, l'ing. Turchi e il Prefetto di Massa Carrara riguardo alla variante al progetto della linea nei pressi di Avenza, 20 novembre 1875.
  - Studi di variante ad Avenza, 22 febbraio - 22 ottobre 1875.
  - Sottopassaggio ad Avenza, 14 ottobre 1875 - 25 settembre 1876.
  - Progetti, 1 luglio 1877.
  - Gratificazioni ai capistazione di Avenza e Carrara con ringraziamenti e prospetti delle stesse, 1903–1904.
  - Disegni dei piazzali delle stazioni di Avenza e Marina, senza data.
  - Convenzione n. 113: R. Neumann e FMC per il piano caricatore di Avenza, 1 agosto 1905 - 8 agosto 1955.
  - Convenzione n. 129: C. M. Hembold e FMC per l'allacciamento del piano caricatore ad Avenza, 19 dicembre 1905 - 31 gennaio 1952.
  - Convenzione n. 180: Riccardo Vatteroni e C. e FMC per il carico e scarico dei marmi alla stazione di Avenza, 10 giugno 1910.
  - Convenzione n. 424: Consorzio Marmi Carrara e FMC per l'affitto di una parte dei locali della stazione di Avenza, 22 settembre 1928 - 30 dicembre 1930.
  - Convenzione n. 440: Ferrovie dello Stato e FMC per l'impianto della linea elettrica ad Avenza, 28 febbraio 1925.
  - Convenzione n. 572: Virginia fu Giuseppe Betti e FMC per l'affitto di un piano caricatore presso la stazione FMC di Avenza, 17 novembre 1943 - 25 maggio 1944.
  - Convenzione n. 635: Società Montecatini - Gruppo Marmi e FMC per l'affitto del piano caricatore alla stazione di Avenza, 14 maggio 1949 - 13 maggio 1953.
  - Convenzione n. 912: Ubaldo Crudeli e FMC per l'alienazione della Breda 40 e l'affitto dei locali della stazione ad Avenza, 16 dicembre 1964 - 17 febbraio 1967.
- Rete Ferroviaria Italiana, Fascicolo Linea 99, edizione 2003.
- Annalisa Giovani, Stefano Maggi, Muoversi in Toscana. Ferrovie e trasporti dal Granducato alla Regione, Il Mulino, Bologna, 2005. ISBN 88-15-10814-9.
- Fabrizio Convalle, La casa dei rosmarini, Libromania s.r.l., 2014 (first version eBook: febbraio 2014). ISBN 9788898562275
