= Colonnata =

- Frazione
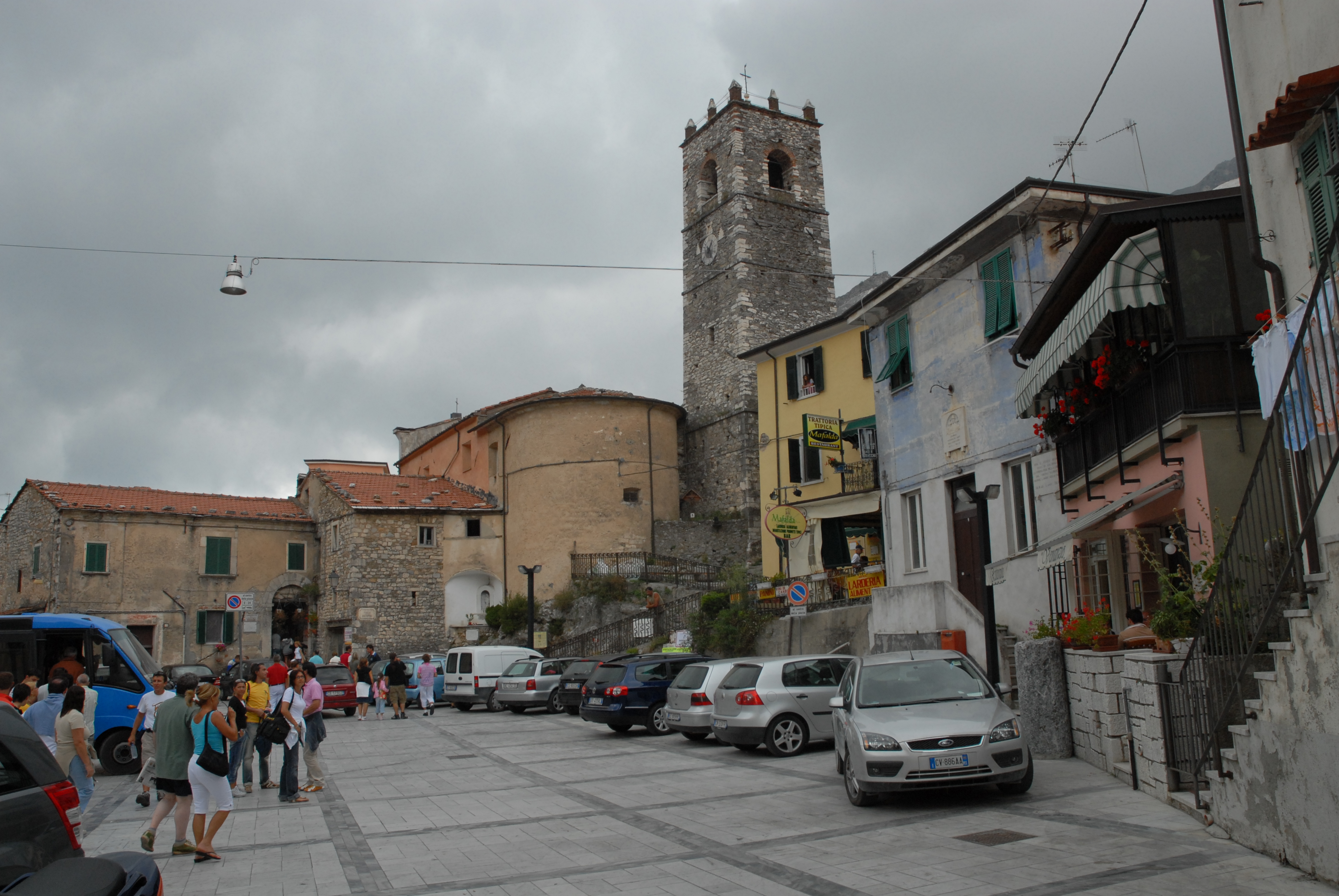
- Central square of Colonnata

- Location of Colonnata in Italy
- Coordinates: 44°05′15″N 10°09′17″E
- Country: Italy
- Region: Tuscany
- Province: Massa and Carrara (MS)
- Comune: Carrara
- Elevation: 532 m (1,745 ft)

Population
  - Total: 295
- Demonym: Colonnatese(i)
- Time zone: UTC+1 (CET)
  - Summer (DST): UTC+2 (CEST)
- Postal code: 54033
- Dialing code: (+39) 0585

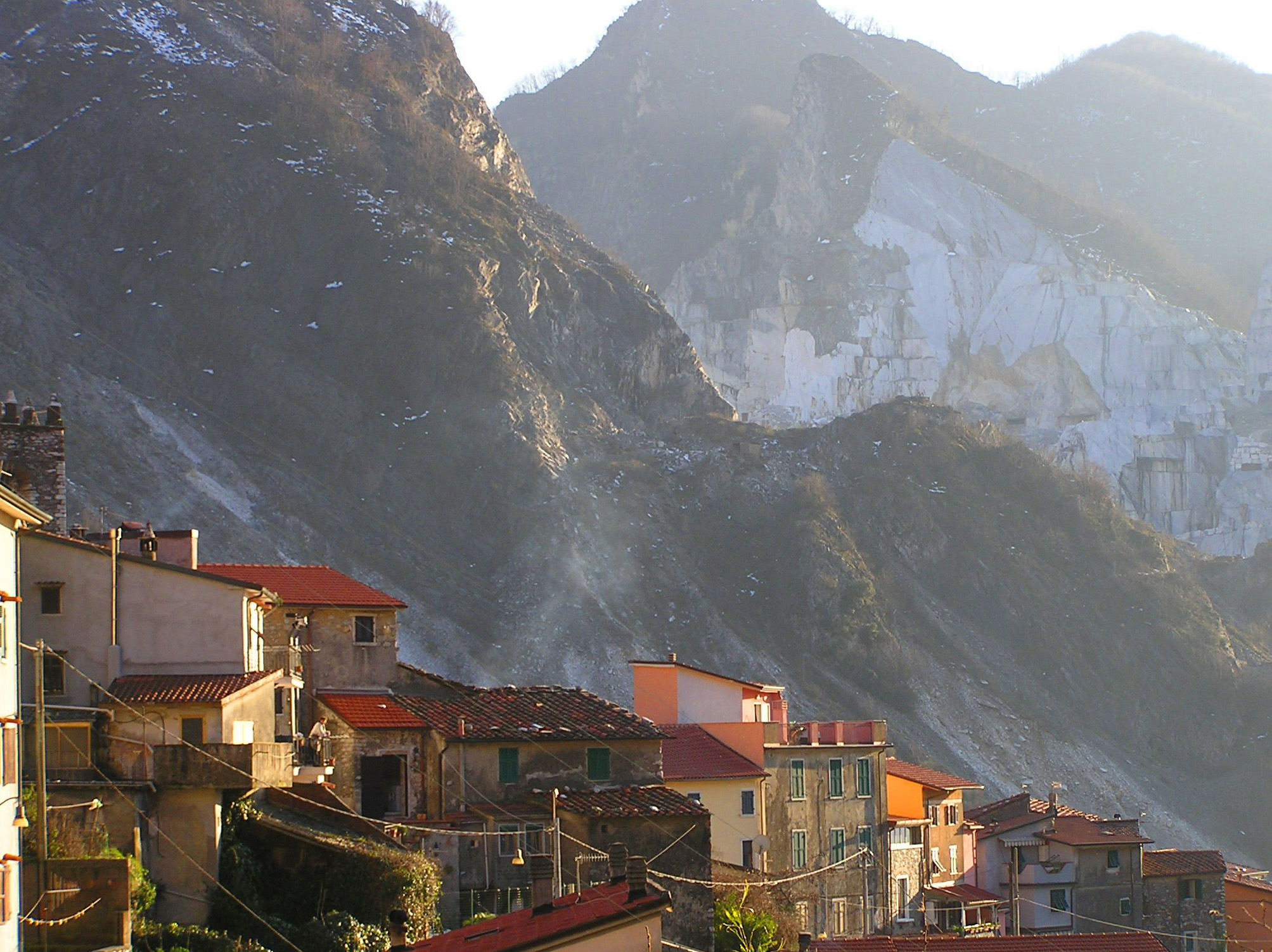
View of Colonnata and Apuan Alps

Colonnata is an Italian ancient village and a hamlet (frazione) of the comune of Carrara, (Massa-Carrara, Tuscany). It is situated in the Apuan Alps, and is known worldwide for the pork fat delicacy Lardo di Colonnata, and for its marble quarries.

== History ==
Colonnata's history dates back to its settlement, around 40 BC. It was built for the housing of slaves used in quarrying marble after Rome decided to replace expensive imported Greek marble with local (Luni) marble.

The name of the settlement is believed derived from the Latin word columna, indicating the place where columns of marble were extracted to be sent to Rome, but the origin of the name could also be the Latin collis ("hill") or columen ( "top").

The quarries may also have been used by the Ligurian Apuani tribe, who were perhaps also used later as quarrying experts. Evidence of mining activity dating back to the 6th century BC has been found at "Fossa Carbonera", Fantiscritti.

Based on a stone found in 1810 bearing the names of the consuls of the years 16 - 22 AD, it appears that the settlement was run by settlers and a magistrate, all of servile origin, who oversaw the work.

Additional records date back only to the 13th century, while the church of the village is believed to date back to the 12th century. It's possible, however, that in the Middle Ages Colonnata was used as a defensive stronghold for those who controlled these areas after the Roman Empire (the Byzantines, the Goths and Lombards).

The village is still mainly supported by mining. The breeding of pigs, promoted by the abundance of chestnut trees, was introduced to Colonnata, perhaps by the Lombards. Over time, this industry evolved, in particular processing freshly slaughtered meat, which was used as bread spread by the quarrymen, thus starting the traditional production of the famous pork fat delicacy, Lardo di Colonnata.

== Geography ==
=== Location and quarrying ===
Colonnata is located in the Apuan Alps (mounts Maggiore, Spallone and Sagro), and is accessible by the road that passes through the villages of Vezzala and Bedizzano.

The village is surrounded by quarries in an area known as "Gioia Calagio", which includes the Gioia Pit, which produces the arabescato and bardiglio varieties of veined marble. The quarry was also used in ancient times, as evidenced by the finds of coins, inscriptions engraved directly on the rock, and a relief of the Roman tutelary deity Silvanus.

The largest Roman quarrying site yet discovered was one kilometre south at Fossacava.

== Places of interest ==
The village has maintained some of its historic features, such as the use of marble in murals, doorways, doorjambs, windows and other architectural features. Also to be seen are the north gate into the town, which belonged to the medieval city walls now gone; a yard paved in marble located at the far south end of town; the Piazza Palestro, which leads to a modern sculpture dedicated to Cristo dei Cavatori ("Christ of the Quarrymen"); and the stone bell tower with a view and a clock.

The sixteenth-century San Bartolomeo parish church has a marble interior, including a main altar in white marble, side altars in multi-coloured marble, a marble relief depicting the Assumption of Mary into heaven among the saints, preserved fragments of an ancon from the altar of Saints Andrew, Bartholomew and Peter, and a 17th-century marble crucifix attributed to a pupil of Michelangelo.

== See also ==
- Lardo di Colonnata
- Marmifera di Carrara railway
