= Miseglia =

- Frazione
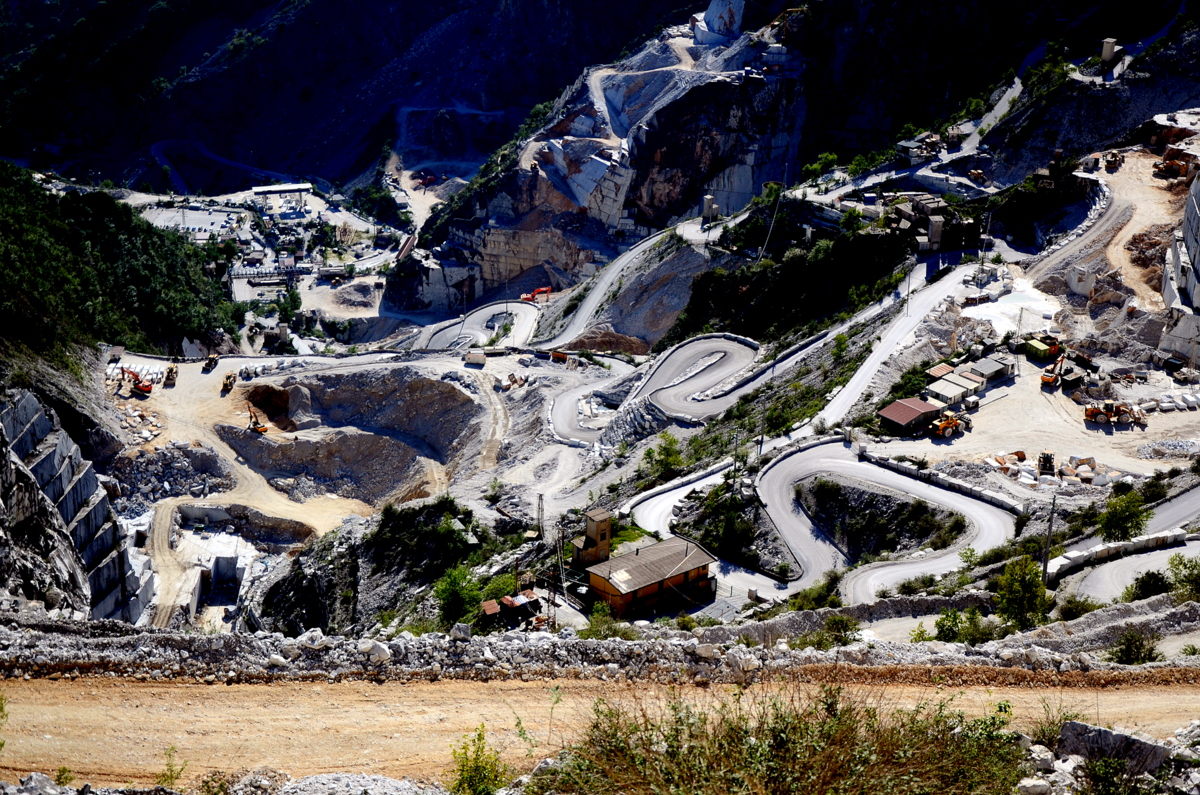
- Canale di Fantiscritti marble quarry

- Location of Miseglia in Italy
- Coordinates: 44°5′0.7″N 10°6′56.3″E
- Country: Italy
- Region: Tuscany
- Province: Massa-Carrara (MS)
- Comune: Carrara
- Elevation: 240 m (790 ft)

Population (2011)
  - Total: 449
- Time zone: UTC+1 (CET)
  - Summer (DST): UTC+2 (CEST)

Miseglia is a village in Tuscany, central Italy, administratively a frazione of the comune of Carrara, province of Massa-Carrara. At the time of the 2011 census its population amounted to 449.

Miseglia is about 2 km from Carrara and 10 km from Massa, and it is situated on a peak next to the Carrara marble quarries of Canale di Fantiscritti and Canalgrande. Those quarries have been excavated since the Roman period. The proper village dates back to the 12th century, when it was a property of the pieve of Sant'Andrea in Carrara.

== Main sights ==
- Santo Spirito, main parish church of Miseglia, it was originally built in the 14th century and completely reconstructed in 1617.

== Notable residents ==
- Dominique Stroobant (1947), Belgian sculptor and photographer.

== Transportations ==
Miseglia was connected to Carrara, other hamlets and several quarries by the Marmifera railway line, an industrial railway used for the transport of Carrara marble. The railway was fully operational from 1876 to 1964, when it was closed due to competition from road traffic. There were two railway stations in Miseglia – Miseglia Superiore (upper side) and Miseglia Inferiore (lower side) – now disclosed.
