= Lizza di Piastreta =

Ruined industrial monorail in Italy

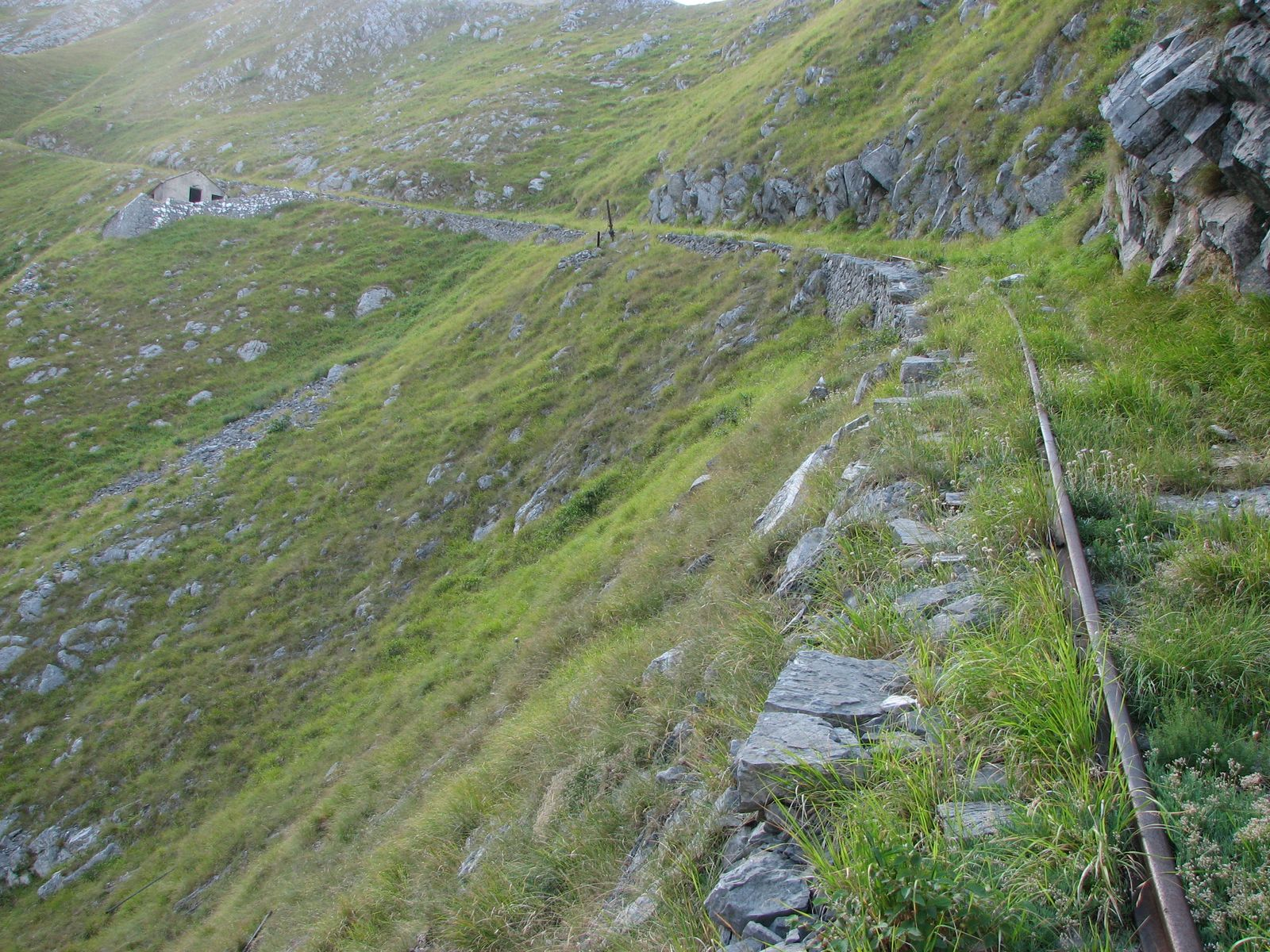
- View of the track

Overview
- Locale: Massa (Italy)
- Termini: Piastreta; Renara
- Stations: none (5 zones crossed)

Service
- Type: Monorail

History
- Opened: 1922
- Closed: 1975

Technical
- Line length: 3.5 km (2.2 mi)

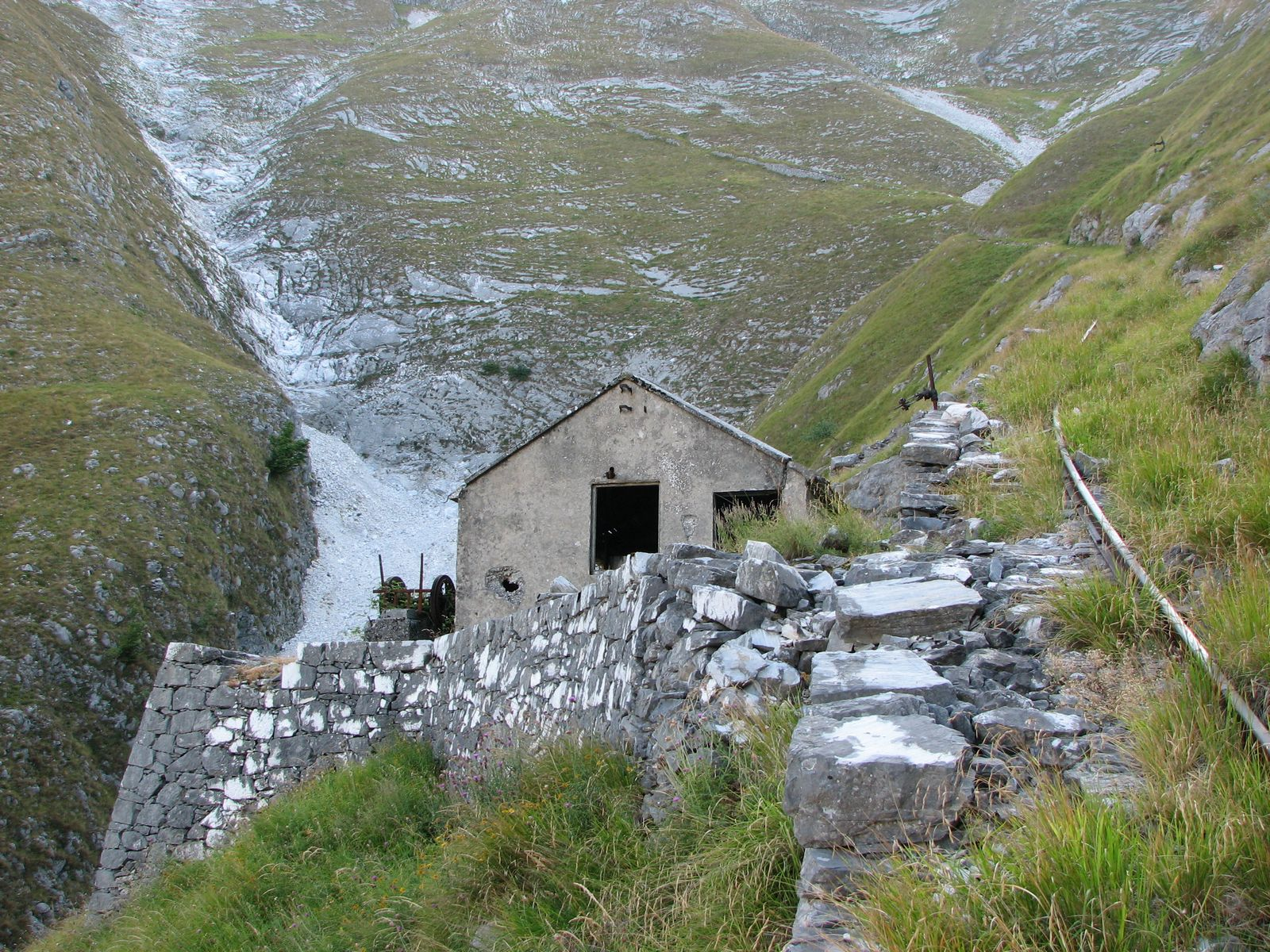
Service building in the area of Fosso del Chiasso

The Lizza di Piastreta, also known as Monorotaia di Piastreta ("Piastreta Monorail"), was an Italian industrial monorail serving the marble quarry of Piastreta, in the Apuan Alps, and linking it to Renara, in the municipal territory of Massa, Tuscany.

== History ==
The monorail was projected in 1922 by the English engineer Charles Denham, owner of the quarry of Piastreta. The line, used to carry the marble from the quarry to the valley, consisted of a single rail on wooden sleepers, on which a motorized tractor hauled a sled load. The system of the sleds was already used, for the transport of marble, also in other vie di lizza (i.e. "routes of contention"), on other trials used for the lizzatura. This was the only plant of its kind to be built, and the track was realized in the workshops of Sesto San Giovanni, near Milan.

In 1959 the course was shortened to Pianel Soprano, closing the route to Renara. Reopened in 1962, the line was active until 1975, when a road for trucks was opened.

The line is still intact, except for some portions disappeared due to erosion. The line, also named Lizza della Monorotaia or Monorotaia Denham, is part of a route of industrial archaeology and, since 2003, like many lizze in the basin of Massa, it is included in the Archaeological Park of the Apuan Alps.

== Route ==
The monorail starts in the quarries of Piastreta (1,580 m), below the Sella mountain, and reaches Renara (310 m), a zone near the village of Gronda, 9 km far from Massa. From an altitude of 995 m begins its descent through a channel called "Fosso del Chiasso", where the slope reaches 90% until the end of the trail at the hill of load. In this section the rail is flanked by a staircase of 2,500 steps that allowed the miners to reach the caves.

Zone	Notes
Piastreta	Location: 44.08818°N 10.23938°E
Fosso della Piastrella	Quarrymen's shelter
Fosso del Chiasso	Service building
Pianel Soprano	Also named "Canale della Buchetta"
Renara	Location: 44.07508°N 10.21693°E

== Gallery ==
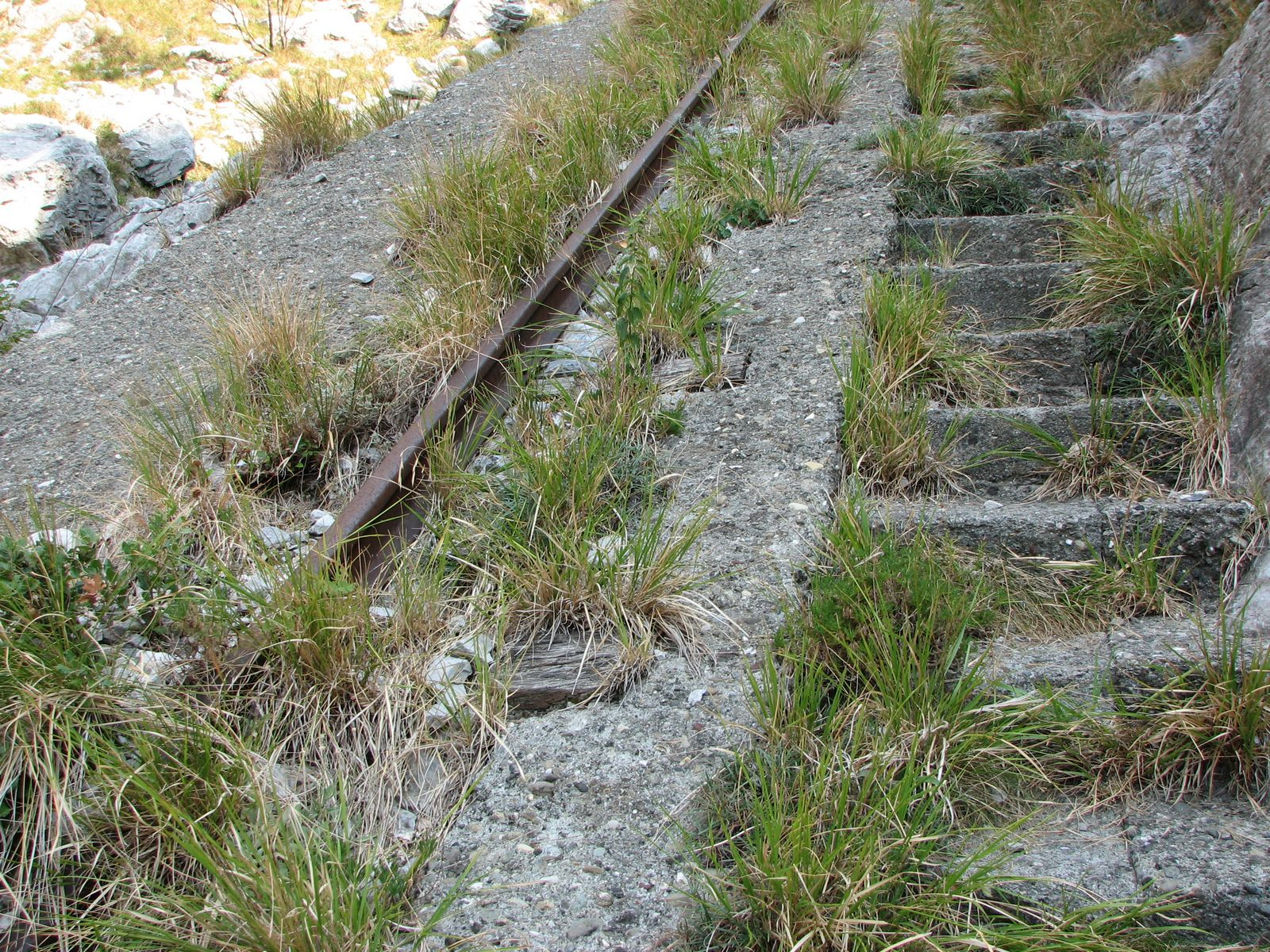
Detail of the track with the parallel stairs

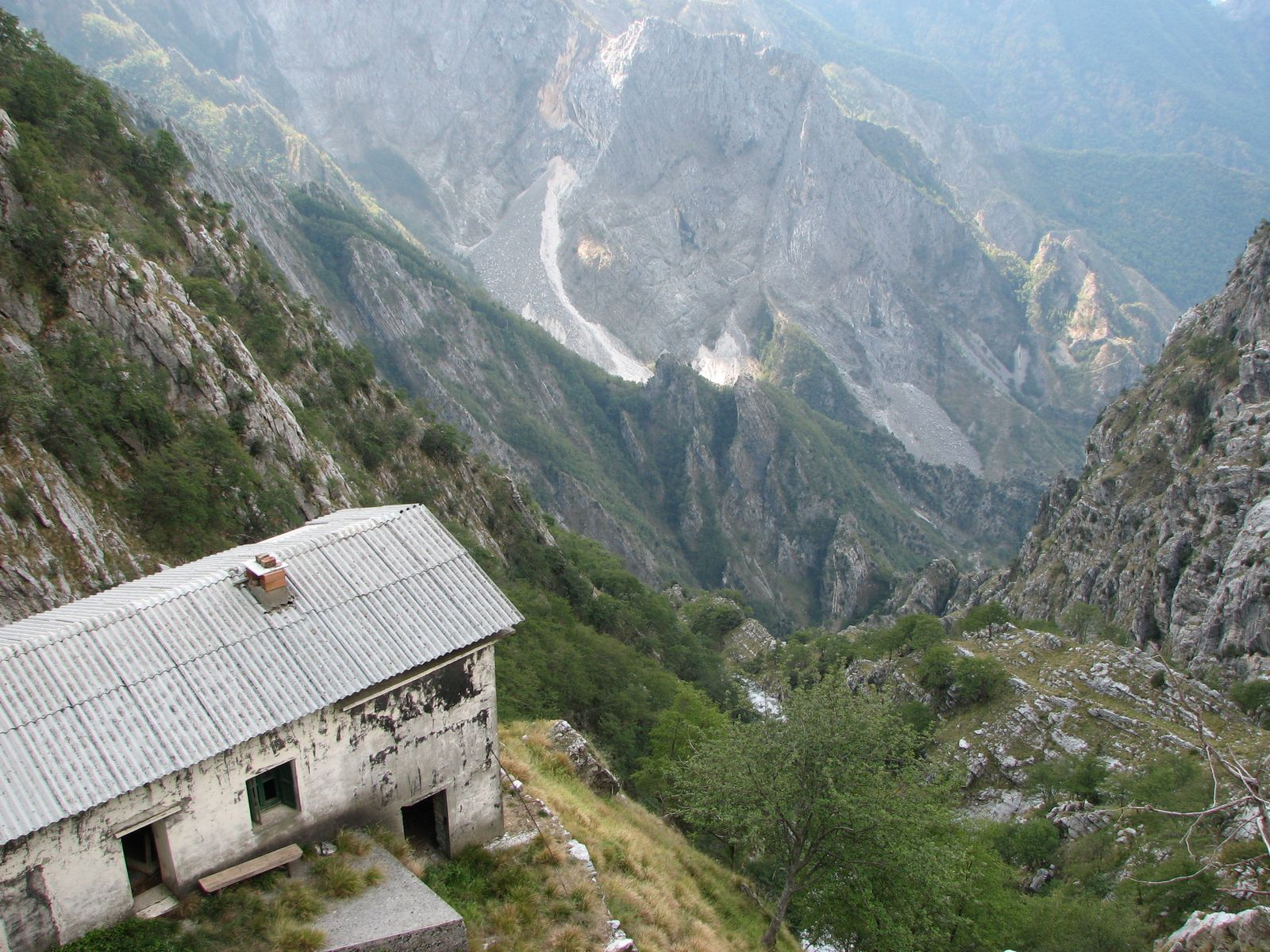
Renara valley from above and quarrymen's shelter

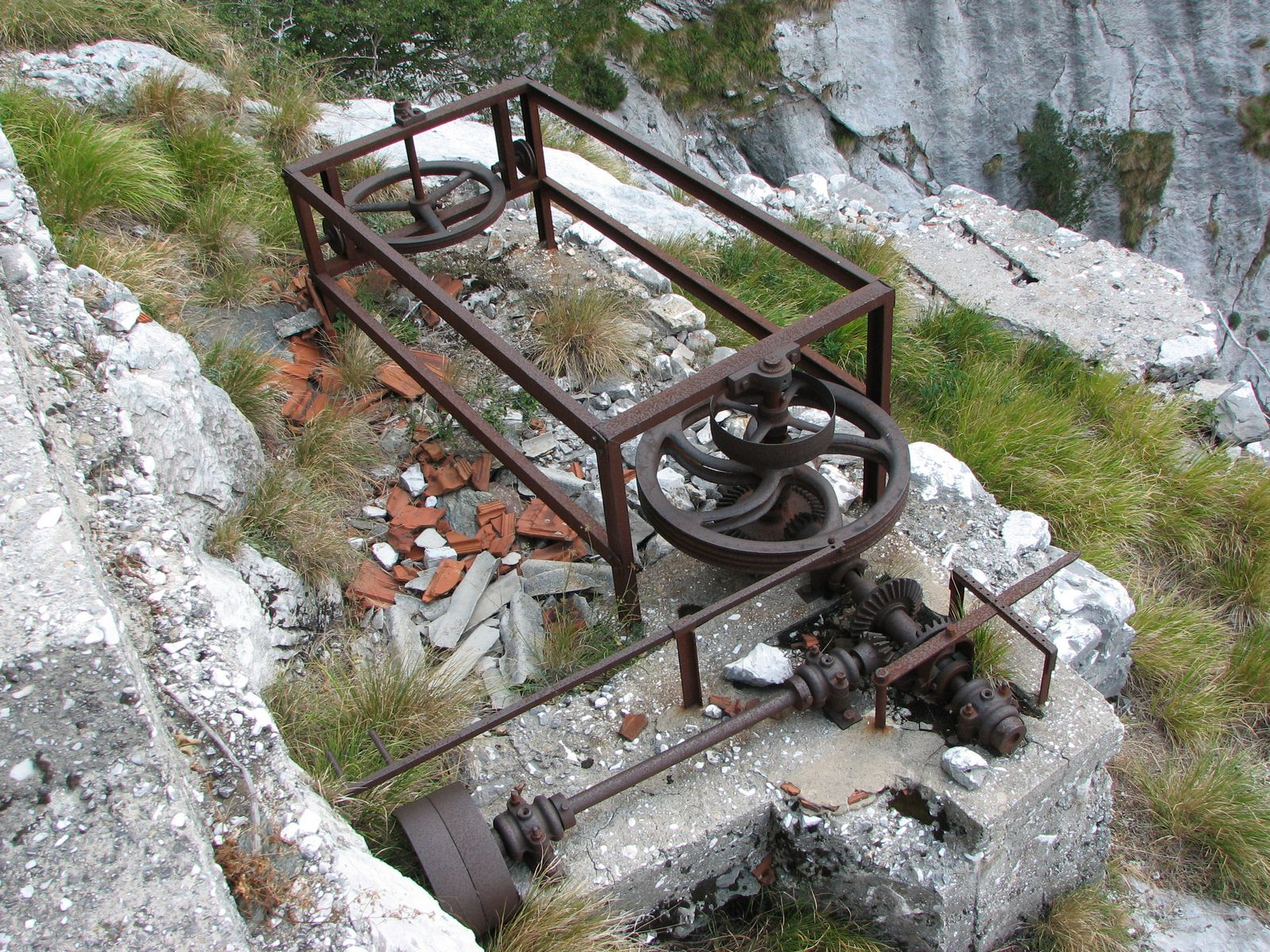
Machinery of the quarrymen near a shelter on the line

== See also ==
- Carrara marble
- Marmifera di Carrara railway
