= Carrara =

City in Tuscany, Italy

Carrara Carara (Emilian)
- Comune
- Comune di Carrara
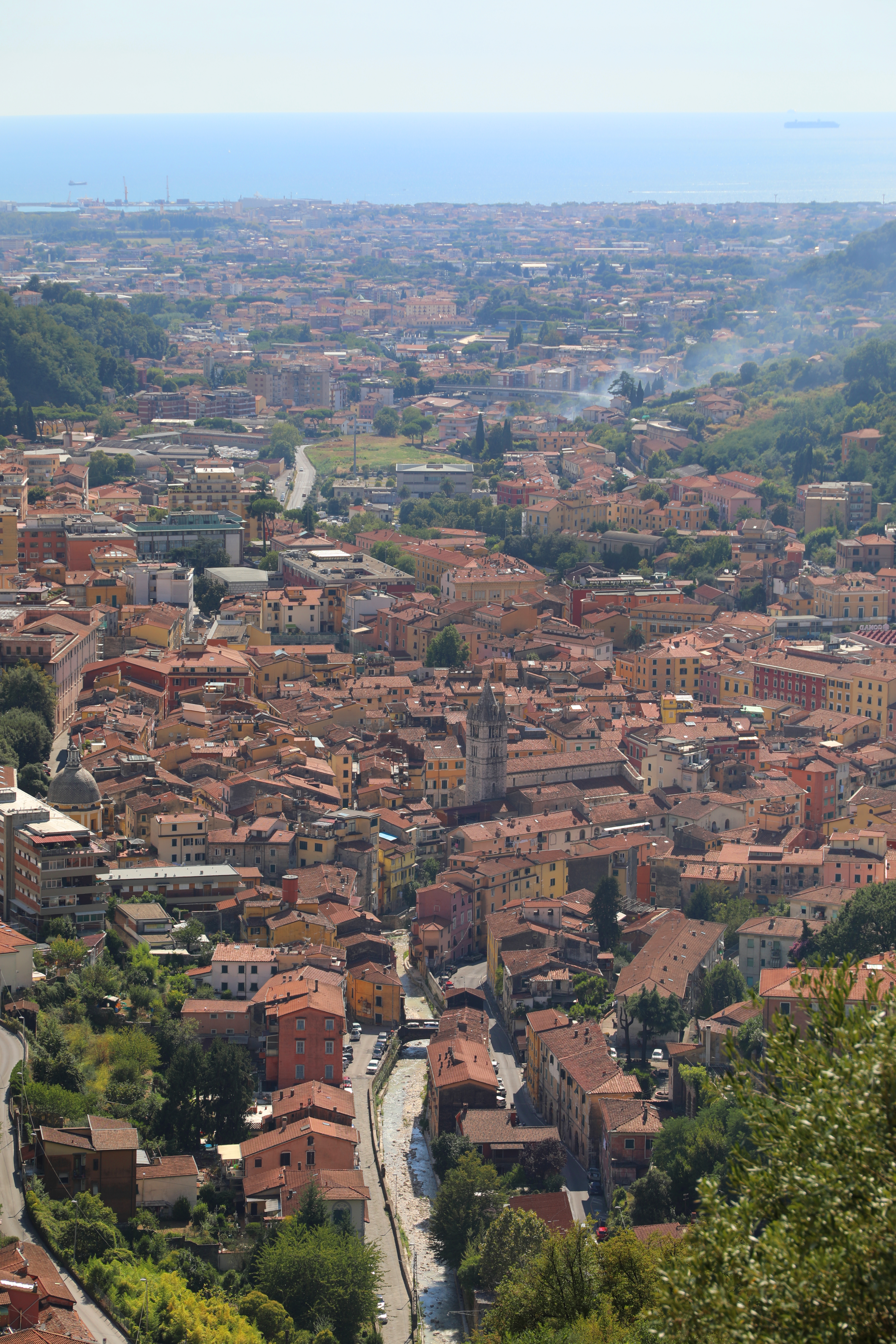

- Flag Coat of arms

- Location within Italy Location within Tuscany
- Coordinates: 44°04.75′N 10°06.00′E
- Country: Italy
- Region: Tuscany
- Province: Massa and Carrara (MS)
- Frazioni: Avenza, Bedizzano, Bergiola, Bonascola, Castelpoggio, Codena, Colonnata, Fontia, Fossola, Gragnana, Marina di Carrara, Miseglia, Nazzano, Noceto, Sorgnano, Torano

Government
  - Mayor: Serena Arrighi (Centre-left)

Area
  - Total: 71 km^{2} (27 sq mi)
- Elevation: 100 m (330 ft)

Population (30 June 2016)
  - Total: 62,923
  - Density: 890/km^{2} (2,300/sq mi)
- Demonym(s): Carraresi, Carrarini
- Time zone: UTC+1 (CET)
  - Summer (DST): UTC+2 (CEST)
- Postal code: 54033
- Dialing code: 0585
- Patron saint: San Ceccardo
- Saint day: 16 June

Carrara (/kəˈrɑːrə/ kə-RAR-ə; Italian: [kaˈraːɾa]; Emilian: Carara, Emilian: [kaˈɾaːɾa]) is a town and comune in Tuscany, in central Italy, of the province of Massa and Carrara, and notable for the white or blue-grey marble quarried there. It is on the Carrione River, some 100 kilometres (62 mi) west-northwest of Florence. Its motto is Latin: "Fortitudo mea in rota" ("My strength is in the wheel"), a reference firstly to the marble shipping industry from Roman times onwards.

The city and the surrounding region have been closely linked with the contemporary anarchist movement, with a significant part of its population being anarchist and many congresses being held there, one of the most notable being the Congress of Carrara (1968), which founded the International of Anarchist Federations (IAF), one of the main anarchist organizations to this day.

== Toponymy ==
The word Carrara likely comes from the pre-Roman (Celtic or Ligurian) element kar (stone), through Latin carrariae meaning 'quarries'.

== History ==
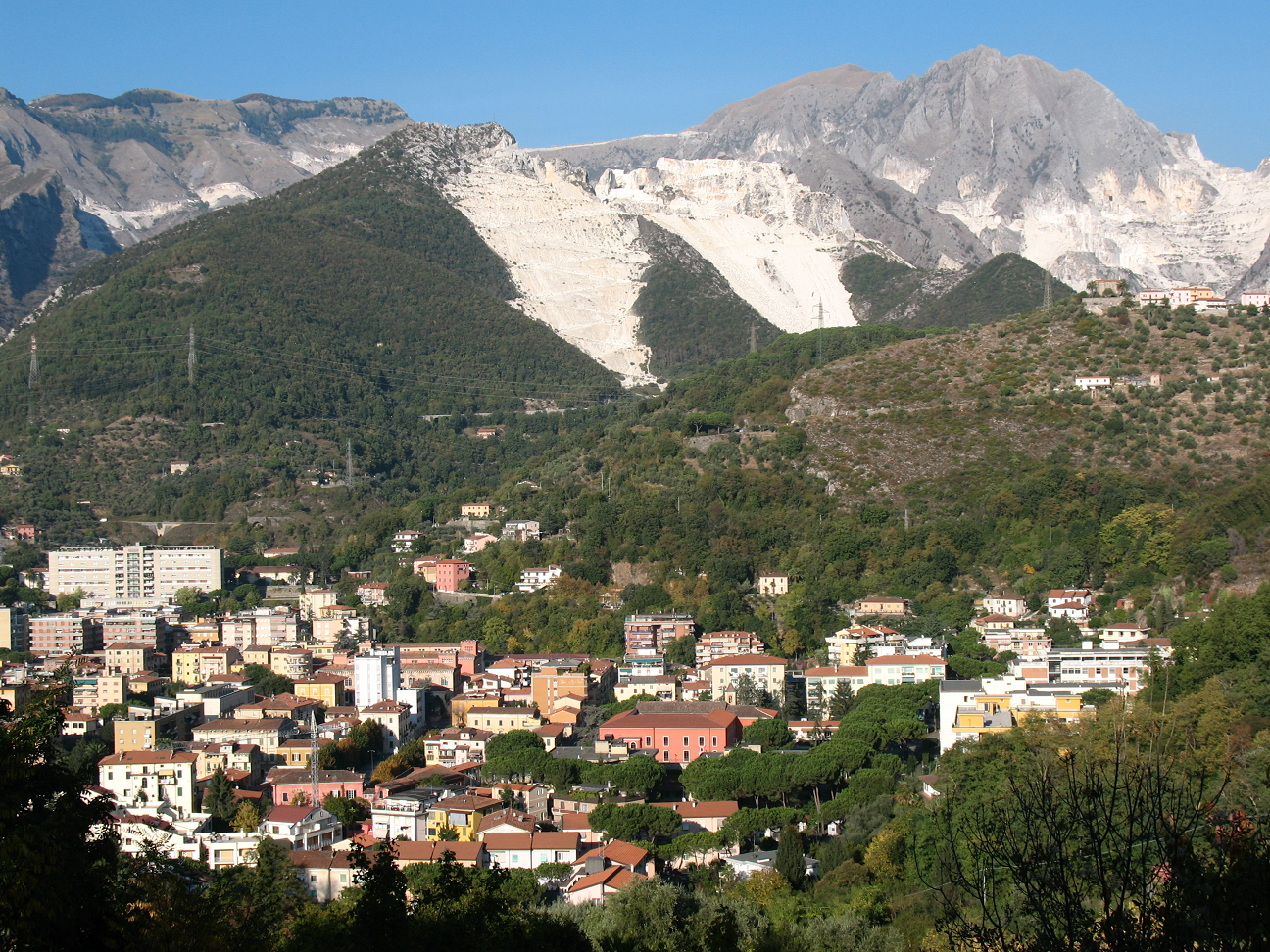
View of Carrara

There were known settlements in the area as early as the ninth century BC, when the Apuan Ligures lived in the region. The current town originated from the borough built to house workers in the marble quarries created by the Romans after their conquest of Liguria in the early second century BC. Carrara has been linked with the process of quarrying and carving marble since the Roman Age. Marble was exported from the nearby harbour of Luni at the mouth of the river Magra.

In the early Middle Ages it was a Byzantine and then Lombard possession, and then, it was under the Bishops of Luni who started to write the city's history when the Emperor Otto I gave it to them. It turned itself into a city-state in the early 13th century; during the struggle between Guelphs and Ghibellines, Carrara usually belonged to the latter party. The Bishops acquired it again in 1230, their rule ending in 1313, when the city was given in succession to the Republics of Pisa, Lucca and Florence. Later it was acquired by Gian Galeazzo Visconti of Milan.

After the death of Filippo Maria Visconti of Milan in 1447, Carrara was fought over by Tommaso Campofregoso, lord of Sarzana, and again the Malaspina family, who moved here the seat of their signoria in the second half of the 15th century. Carrara and Massa formed the Duchy of Massa and Carrara from the 15th to the 19th century. Under the last Malaspina, Maria Teresa, who had married Ercole III d'Este, it became part of the Duchy of Modena.

After the short Napoleonic rule of Elisa Bonaparte, it was given back to Modena. During the unification of Italy age, Carrara was the seat of a popular revolt led by Domenico Cucchiari, and was a center of Giuseppe Mazzini's revolutionary activity.

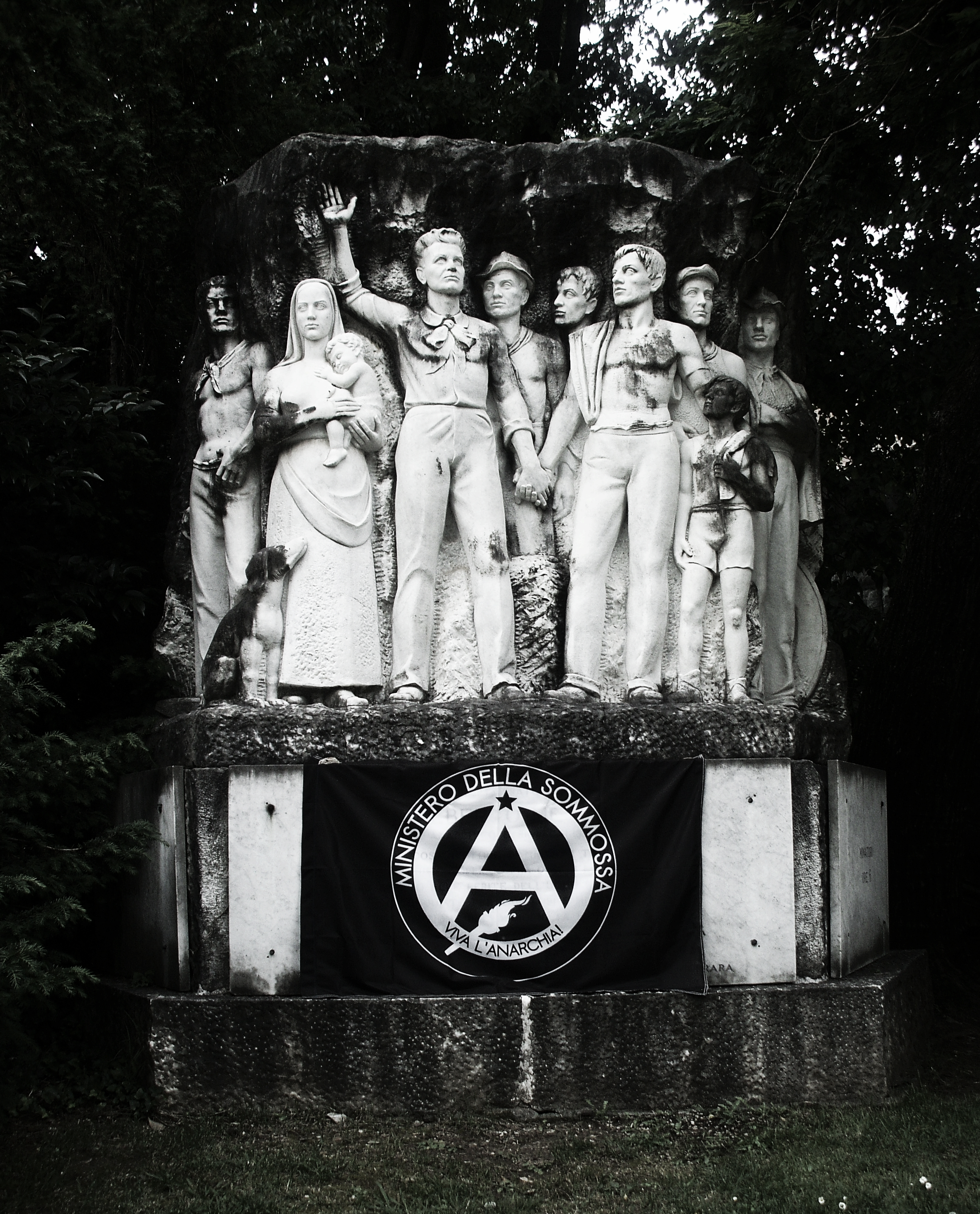
The Alberto Meschi monument in Carrara.

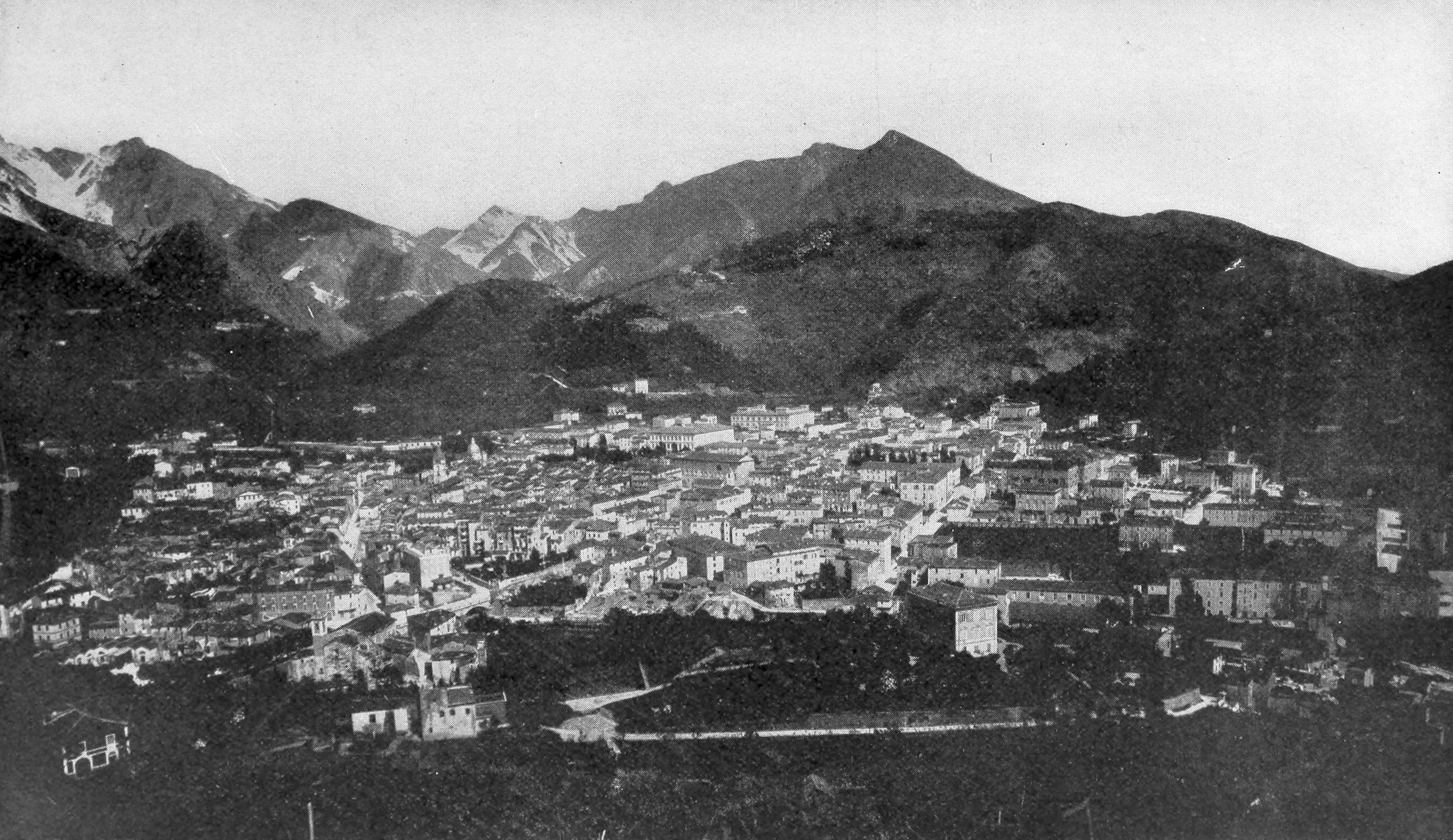
Carrara in 1911

At the end of the 19th century Carrara became the cradle of anarchism in Italy, in particular among the quarry workers. The quarry workers, including the stone carvers, had radical beliefs that set them apart from others. Ideas from outside the city began to influence the Carrarese. Anarchism and general radicalism became part of the heritage of the stone carvers. According to a The New York Times article of 1894 many violent revolutionists who had been expelled from Belgium and Switzerland went to Carrara in 1885 and founded the first anarchist group in Italy. Carrara has remained a continuous 'hotbed' of anarchism in Italy, with several organizations located in the city. The Anarchist marble workers were also the driving force behind organising labour in the quarries and in the carving sheds. They were also the main protagonists of the Lunigiana revolt in January 1894.

In 1929, the municipalities of Carrara, Massa and Montignoso were merged in a single municipality, called Apuania. In 1945 the previous situation was restored.

In 1968, it was estimated that about 90% of the population of the city and the surrounding region was anarchist, which explains the organization of many congresses there by the Italian Anarchist Federation (FAIt). One of the most notable, the Congress of Carrara (1968), founded the International of Anarchist Federations (IAF) there, one of the main contemporary anarchist organizations.

=== Title ===
As a titular Duke of Modena, the current holder of the title of "Prince of Carrara" would be Prince Lorenz of Belgium, Archduke of Austria-Este.

== Economy ==
Carrara marble has been used since the time of Ancient Rome. The Pantheon and Trajan's Column in Rome are constructed of it, and many sculptures of the Renaissance were carved from it.

Carrara-Avenza railway station is the nearest train station.

== Culture ==
Fortitude Mea in Rota "My strength in the wheel". The wheel of the carriage made to transport marble blocks from quarry to load out during Roman Empire and after, is the symbol of Carrara.

== Coat of arms and symbols ==
According to the Grand Orient of Italy, the coat of arms of Carrara contains the Comacina wheel, symbol of the ancient master stonemasons of Como.

== Main sights ==
- Cathedral (Duomo, 12th century).
- Ducal Palace (also Palazzo Cybo Malaspina, 16th century), now the seat of the Fine Arts Academy. Built over pre-existing Lombard fortification, it dates to the reign of Guglielmo Malaspina, becoming in 1448 the permanent seat of the dynasty. It includes two distinct edifices: the Castello Malaspiniano, dating to the 13th century, and the Renaissance palace, begun by Alberico I in the late 16th century. Under the medieval loggia are exposed several ancient Roman findings.
- Baroque church and convent of San Francesco, built in 1623–64 by order of Carlo I Cybo-Malaspina.
- Church of the Suffragio, begun in 1686 under design of Innocenzo Bergamini, and refurbished in the 19th century. The façade has a large marble portal in Baroque style, sculpted by Carlo Finelli and surmounted by a bas-relief with the "Madonna and the Souls of the Purgatory".
- Palazzo Cybo-Malaspina
- Sanctuary of the Madonna delle Grazie alla Lugnola, consecrated in 1676 and designed by Alessandro Bergamini.
- Church of Santa Maria Assunta, at Torano. It has a 16th-century façade with a portal from 1554. The interior is on a nave and two aisles.

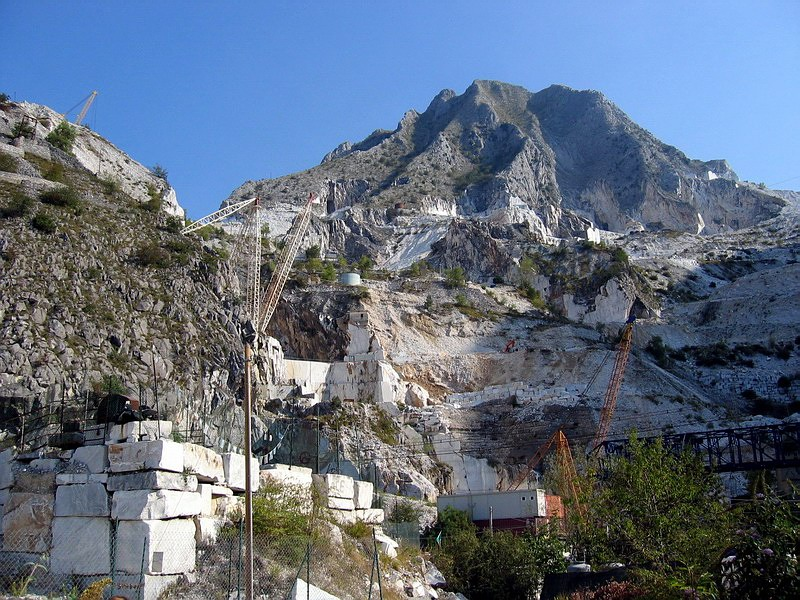
A Carrara marble quarry

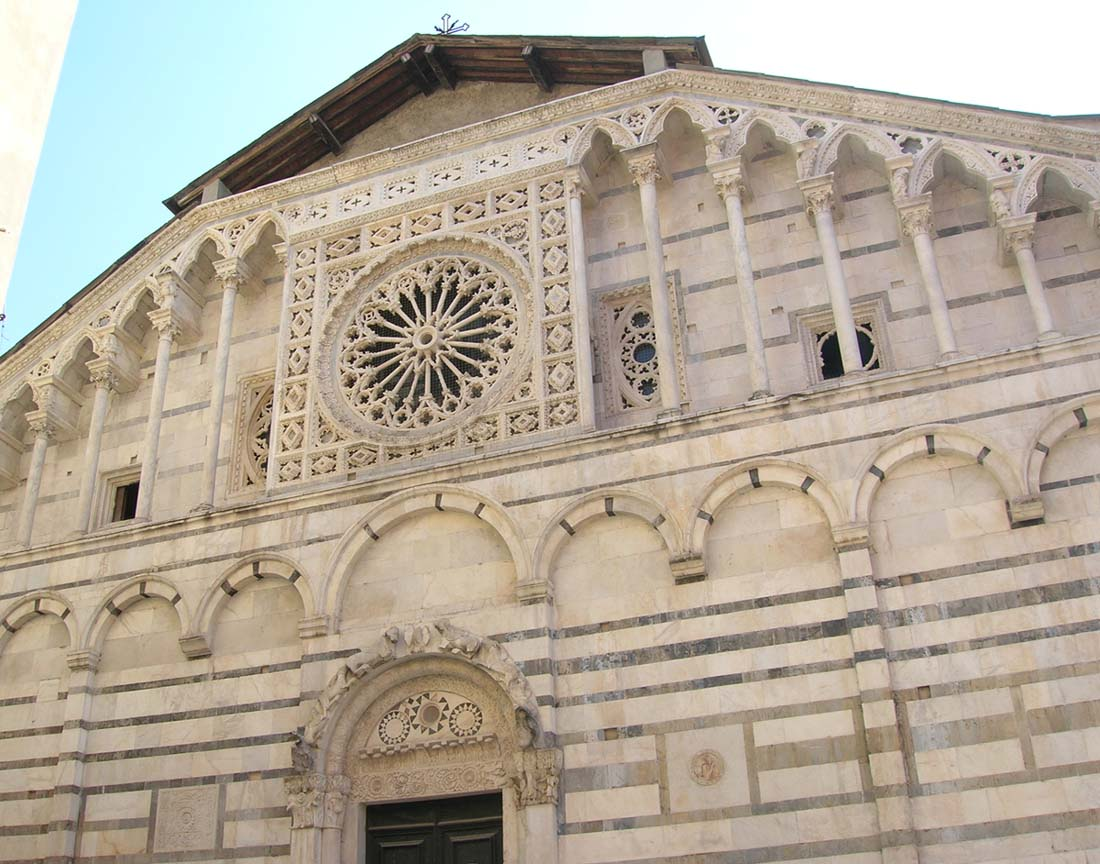
Façade of the cathedral

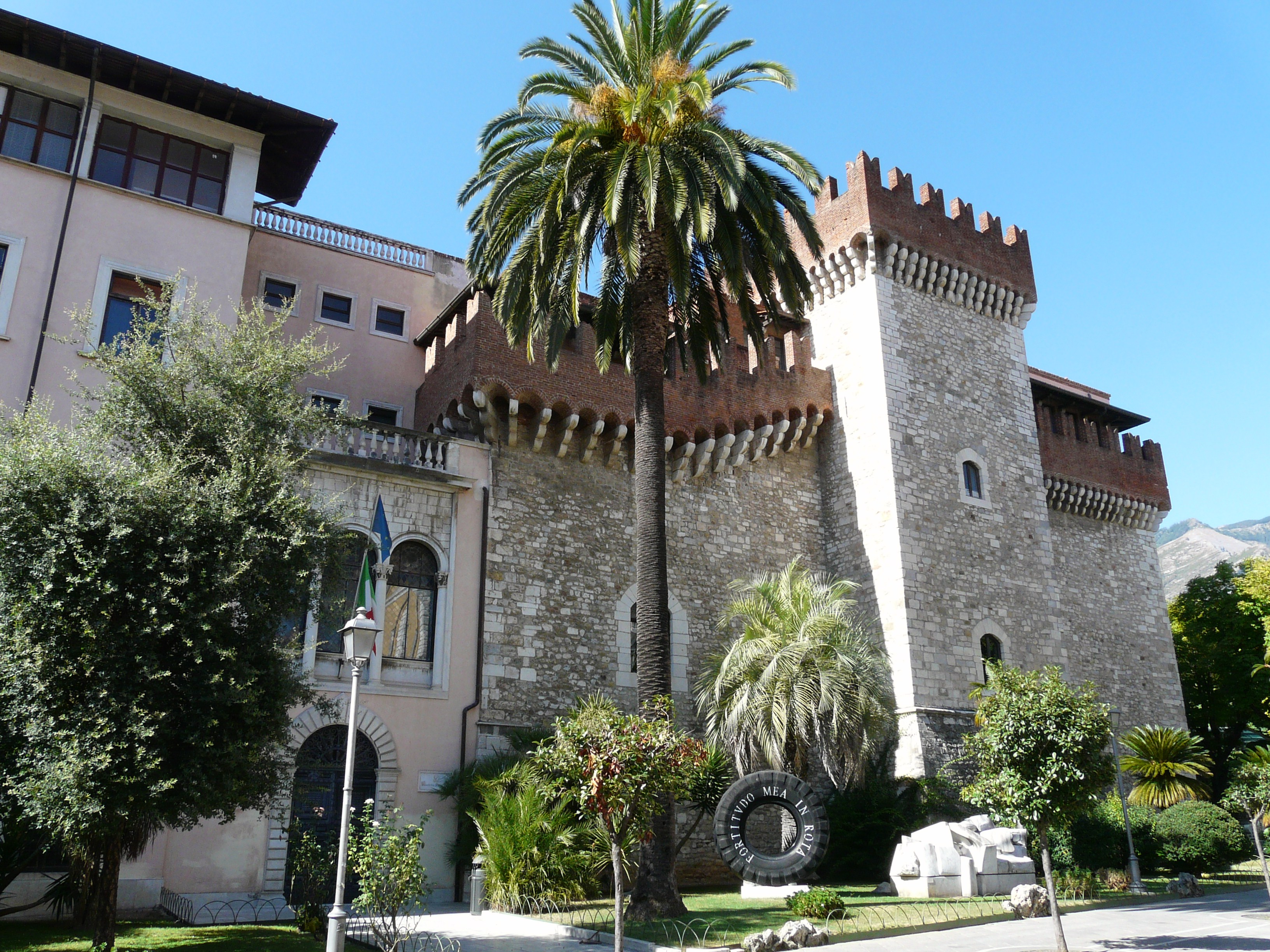
Palazzo Cybo Malaspina

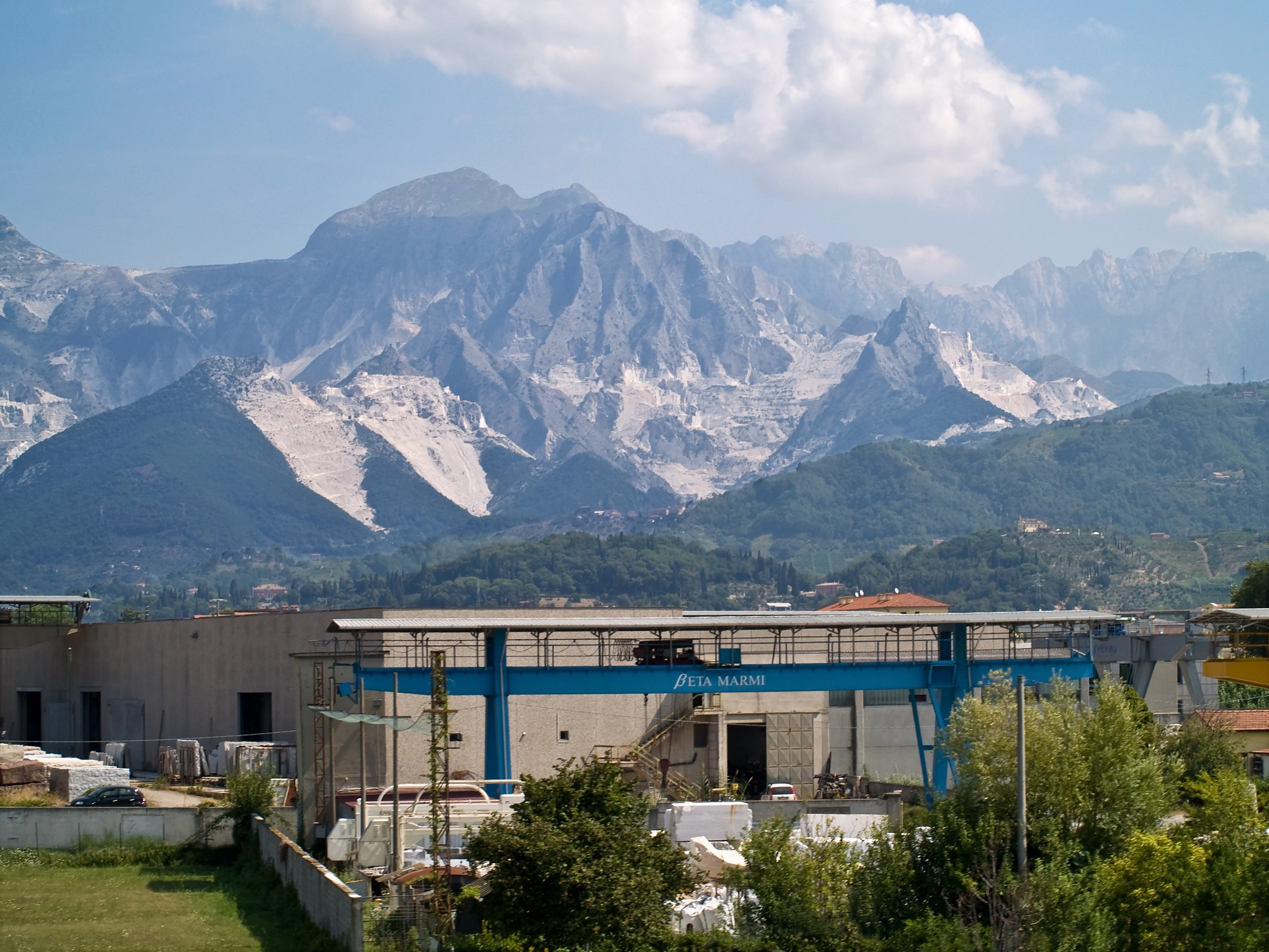
Carrara marble exploitation

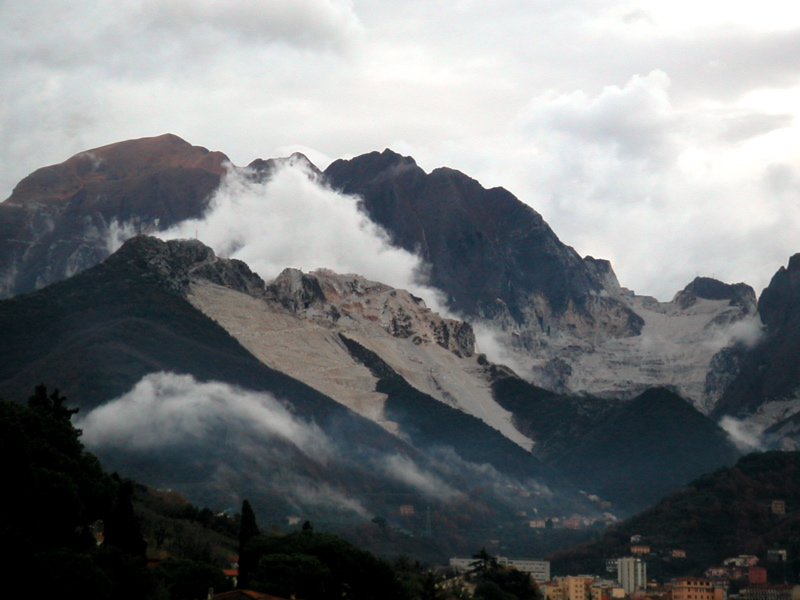
Monte Sagro and nearby quarries

== Sister cities ==
Carrara is twinned with:

- Grasse, France
- Ingolstadt, Germany
- Kragujevac, Serbia
- Opole, Poland
- Yerevan, Armenia
- Yunfu, China

== Notable people ==
- Eumone Baratta (1823~After 1890), sculptor
- Carlo Bergamini (1868–1934), sculptor
- Federico Bernardeschi (born 1994), footballer
- Gianluigi Buffon (born 1978), footballer
- Giorgio Chinaglia (1947–2012), footballer
- Hanna Eshel (1926–2023), sculptor
- Francesco Gabbani (born 1982), singer
- Lorenzo Musetti (born 2002), tennis player
- Pietro Tacca (1577–1640), sculptor
- Cristiano Zanetti (born 1977), footballer

== See also ==
- No Cav
- Carrara marble
- Marmifera di Carrara railway
